= List of members of the 6th Northern Cape Provincial Legislature =

6th Northern Cape Provincial Legislature
←	5th Legislature	7th Legislature	→
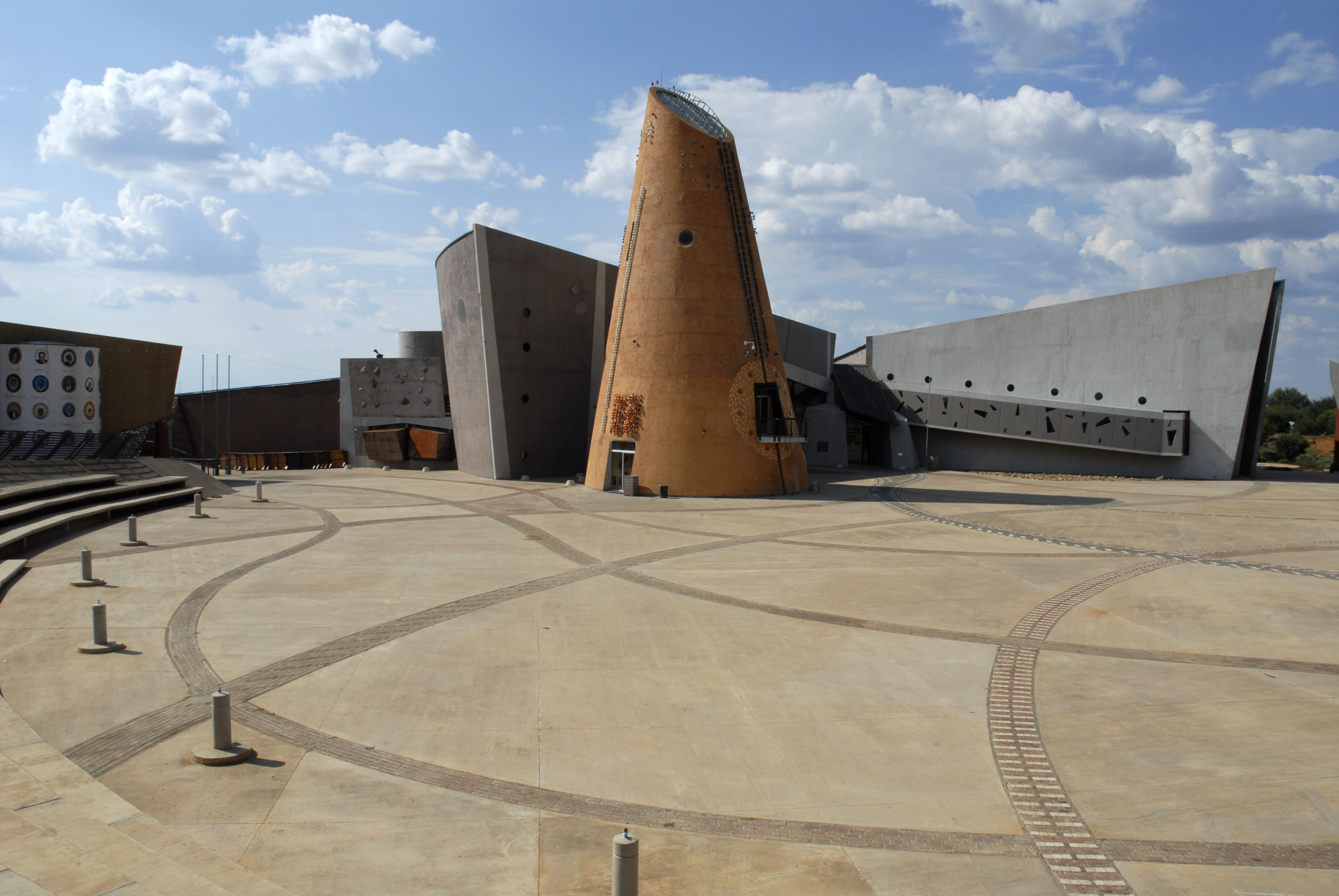
- New Provincial Legislature Building, Galeshewe, Kimberley

Overview
- Legislative body: Northern Cape Provincial Legislature
- Jurisdiction: Northern Cape, South Africa
- Meeting place: New Provincial Legislature Building, Galeshewe, Kimberley
- Term: 22 May 2019 – 28 May 2024
- Election: 8 May 2019
- Government: Executive Council of Zamani Saul
- Members: 30
- Speaker: Newrene Klaaste
- Deputy Speaker: Mangaliso Matika
- Premier: Zamani Saul
- Leader of the Opposition: Andrew Louw (Until 2021); Harold McGluwa (2021-present)
- Party control: African National Congress

From May 2019 until May 2024, the Northern Cape Provincial Legislature, legislature of the Northern Cape province of South Africa, consisted of 30 members from 4 different political parties, elected on 8 May 2019 in the 2019 South African general election. The ruling African National Congress (ANC) retained its majority by earning a total of 18 members, a loss of two seats from the previous legislature. The official opposition Democratic Alliance (DA) won 8 seats, one more than it held in the previous legislative session. The Economic Freedom Fighters (EFF) won 3 seats, a gain of one from the previous election. The Freedom Front Plus (FF+) managed to win a seat in the legislature for the first time since 2004.

Members of the Provincial Legislature (MPLs) are elected through a system of party-list proportional representation with closed lists. This means that each voter casts a vote for one political party, and seats in the legislature are assigned to the parties in proportion to the number of votes they received. The seats are then filled by members by lists acceded by the parties before the election.

Members of the 6th Provincial Legislature took office on 22 May 2019. During the first sitting, Newrene Klaaste was elected the new Speaker with Mangaliso Matika as the new Deputy Speaker, while Zamani Saul was elected Premier. They are all members of the ANC. Andrew Louw of the DA retained the role of Leader of the Opposition.

== Current composition ==
This is a graphical comparison of party strengths as they are in the 6th Northern Cape Provincial Legislature.

- Note this is not the official seating plan of the Northern Cape Provincial Legislature.

Party	Seats
African National Congress	18
DA	8
Economic Freedom Fighters	3
VF+	1
Total	30

== Members ==
Name	Parliamentary group	Term start	Term end
Aubrey Baartman	Economic Freedom Fighters	22 May 2019	31 October 2022
Boitumelo Babuseng	Democratic Alliance	22 May 2019	30 November 2019
Martha Bartlett	African National Congress	22 May 2019	11 June 2020
Venus Blennies	African National Congress	18 October 2022	28 May 2024
Nomandla Bloem	African National Congress	22 May 2019	28 May 2024
Danie Coetzee	Freedom Front Plus	22 May 2019	28 May 2024
David Dichaba	African National Congress	22 May 2019	6 October 2022
Desery Finies	African National Congress	12 June 2020	28 May 2024
Isak Fritz	Democratic Alliance	22 May 2019	28 May 2024
Allen Grootboom	Democratic Alliance	22 May 2019	11 September 2019
Priscilla Isaacs	Democratic Alliance	22 May 2019	28 May 2024
Mac Jack	African National Congress	22 May 2019	12 August 2020
Michael Kaars	Democratic Alliance	19 April 2022	28 May 2024
Newrene Klaaste	African National Congress	22 May 2019	28 May 2024
Limakatso Koloi	African National Congress	22 May 2019	28 May 2024
Mooketsi Konote	Economic Freedom Fighters	21 November 2022	28 May 2024
Maruping Lekwene	African National Congress	22 May 2019	28 May 2024
Glenda Lepolesa	Economic Freedom Fighters	22 May 2019	28 May 2024
Reinette Liebenberg	Democratic Alliance	22 May 2019	28 May 2024
Andrew Louw	Democratic Alliance	22 May 2019	31 March 2022
Fufe Makatong	African National Congress	12 June 2020	28 May 2024
Neo Maneng	African National Congress	22 May 2019	28 May 2024
Mase Manopole	African National Congress	22 May 2019	28 May 2024
Mangaliso Matika	African National Congress	22 May 2019	28 May 2024
Harold McGluwa	Democratic Alliance	22 May 2019	28 May 2024
Ofentse Mokae	Democratic Alliance	11 September 2019	28 May 2024
Zolile Monakali	African National Congress	8 September 2020	28 May 2024
Fawzia Rhoda	Democratic Alliance	22 May 2019	28 May 2024
Zamani Saul	African National Congress	22 May 2019	28 May 2024
Lorraine Senye	African National Congress	22 May 2019	28 May 2024
Berenice Sinexve	African National Congress	22 May 2019	11 June 2020
Grantham Steenkamp	Democratic Alliance	2 December 2019	1 December 2023
Sanna Tities	African National Congress	22 May 2019	28 May 2024
Shadrack Tlhaole	Economic Freedom Fighters	22 May 2019	28 May 2024
Gift van Staden	African National Congress	22 May 2019	28 May 2024
Bentley Vass	African National Congress	22 May 2019	28 May 2024
Nontobeko Vilakazi	African National Congress	22 May 2019	28 May 2024
Abraham Vosloo	African National Congress	22 May 2019	28 May 2024

== See also ==
- List of members of the 5th Northern Cape Provincial Legislature
