= 2019 Northern Cape provincial election =

South African provincial election

| ← 2014 | 8 May 2019 | 2024 → |

All 30 seats to the Northern Cape Provincial Legislature 16 seats needed for a majority
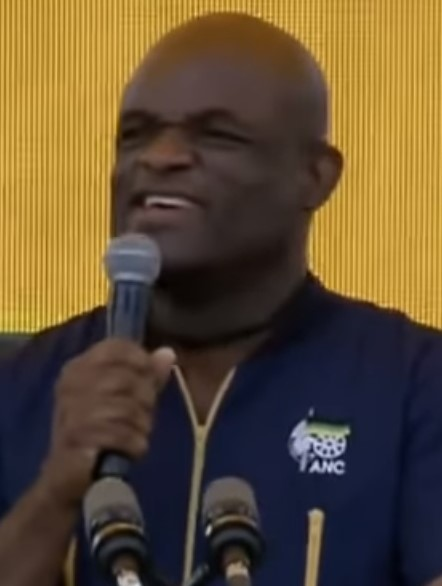

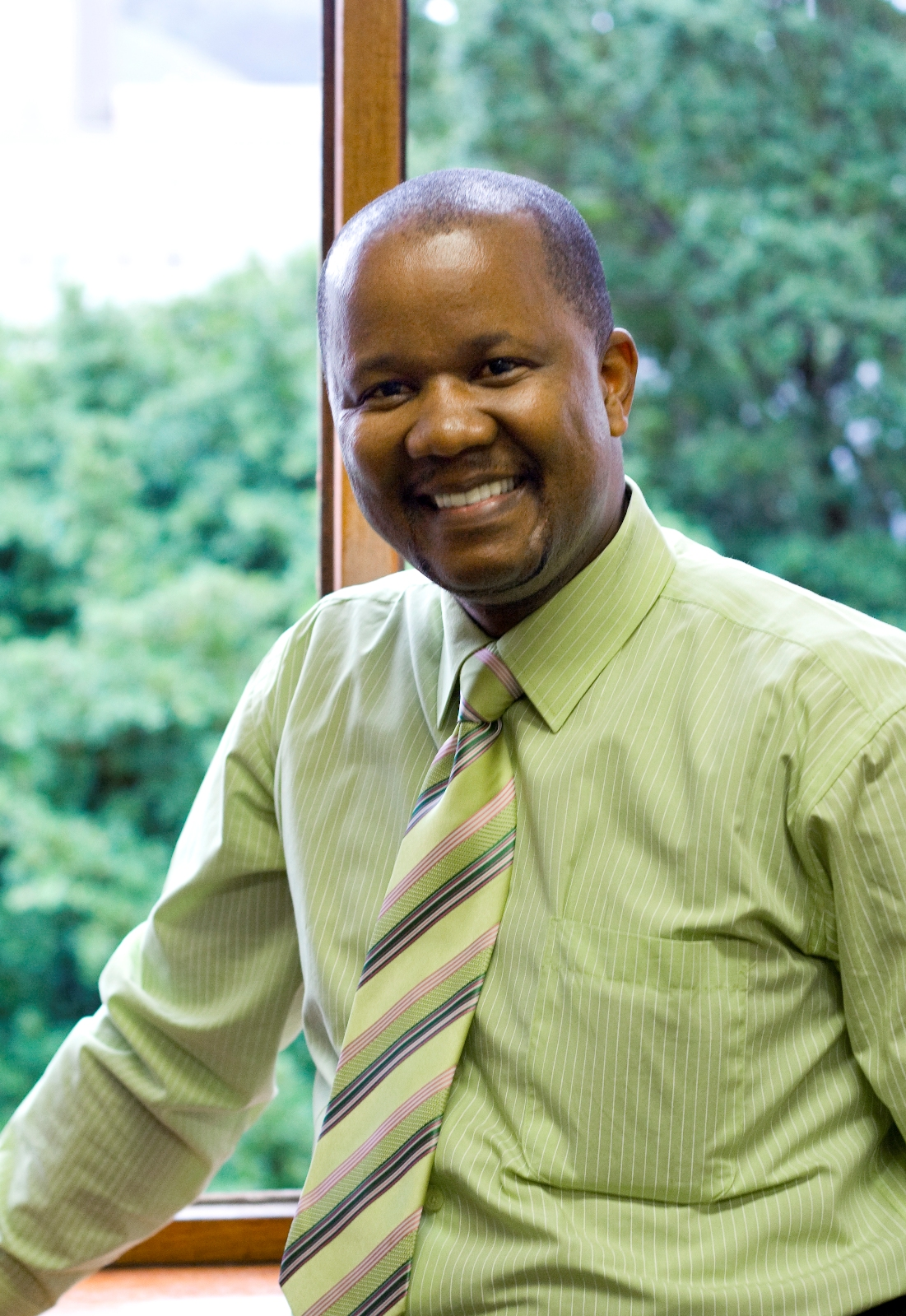
| | First party | Second party | Third party |
|---|---|---|---|
| | | | EFF |
| Candidate | Zamani Saul | Andrew Louw | Shadrack Tlhaole |
| Party | ANC | DA | EFF |
| Last election | 64.40% | 23.89% | 4.96% |
| Seats before | 20 | 7 | 2 |
| Seats won | 18 | 8 | 3 |
| Seat change | ▼2 | ▲1 | ▲1 |
| Popular vote | 228,265 | 101,198 | 38,527 |
| Percentage | 57.54% | 25.51% | 9.71% |
| Swing | ▼6.86% | ▲1.68% | ▲4.75% |
| | Fourth party | Fifth party | Sixth party |
| | FF+ | COPE | Good |
| Candidate | Wynand Boshoff | Ouneas Dikgetsi | Leonard Francois Mckay |
| Party | Freedom Front Plus | Congress of the People | Good |
| Last election | 1.09% | 3.60% | New Party |
| Seats before | 0 | 1 | New Party |
| Seats won | 1 | 0 | 0 |
| Seat change | ▲1 | ▼1 | New Party |
| Popular vote | 10,641 | 3,400 | 3,283 |
| Percentage | 2.68% | 0.86% | 0.83% |
| Swing | ▲1.59% | ▼2.74% | New Party |
Premier before election
Sylvia Lucas
African National Congress
Elected Premier
Zamani Saul
African National Congress

The 2019 Northern Cape provincial election was held on 8 May 2019 to allocate the 30 seats of the Northern Cape Provincial Legislature. Like all the South African provincial elections, it was held on the same day as the South African general election. 21 political parties participated in the election, of which only the African National Congress, Democratic Alliance, Economic Freedom Fighters, and Freedom Front Plus won seats. The ANC lost two seats, but maintained a majority.

== Premier Candidates ==
=== African National Congress ===
There was some controversy prior to the election regarding the Northern Cape ANC's leadership. ANC Provincial Chairpersoni Dr. Zamani Saul won the premiership despite a long rivalry with the incumbent premier, Sylvia Lucas. Their rivalry was considered to be a proxy of that between Jacob Zuma and Cyril Ramaphosa, with Lucas supporting Zuma and Saul supporting Ramaphosa. The provincial ANC youth league endorsed Saul, with youth league secretary Xhanti Teki stating that Saul's track record proved he would be able to improve Northern Cape's economy. After leaving office, Lucas became the Deputy Chairperson of the National Council of Provinces.

=== Democratic Alliance ===
In 2018, the DA announced that Andrew Louw would be their premier candidate in the upcoming election. The DA had plans to become the dominant party in the Northern Cape, however these plans failed.

=== Economic Freedom Fighters ===
The EFF did not field premier candidates in any province, as they are opposed to the idea of provinces altogether. Shadrack Tlhaole was first on their party list.

== Results ==
| Party | Votes | % | +/– | Seats | +/– |
|---|---|---|---|---|---|
| African National Congress | 228,265 | 57.54 | –6.86 | 18 | –2 |
| Democratic Alliance | 101,198 | 25.51 | +1.62 | 8 | +1 |
| Economic Freedom Fighters | 38,527 | 9.71 | +4.75 | 3 | +1 |
| Freedom Front Plus | 10,641 | 2.68 | +1.59 | 1 | +1 |
| Congress of the People | 3,400 | 0.86 | –2.74 | 0 | –1 |
| Good | 3,283 | 0.83 | New | 0 | New |
| African Christian Democratic Party | 2,912 | 0.73 | +0.20 | 0 | 0 |
| African Independent Congress | 2,191 | 0.55 | New | 0 | New |
| Azanian People's Organisation | 996 | 0.25 | 0.00 | 0 | 0 |
| Khoisan Revolution | 990 | 0.25 | New | 0 | New |
| African Transformation Movement | 940 | 0.24 | New | 0 | New |
| African People's Convention | 608 | 0.15 | –0.13 | 0 | 0 |
| Aboriginal Khoisan | 573 | 0.14 | New | 0 | New |
| Socialist Revolutionary Workers Party | 542 | 0.14 | New | 0 | New |
| Pan Africanist Congress | 435 | 0.11 | 0.00 | 0 | 0 |
| Afrikan Alliance of Social Democrats | 360 | 0.09 | New | 0 | New |
| United Democratic Movement | 245 | 0.06 | –0.03 | 0 | 0 |
| African Covenant | 196 | 0.05 | New | 0 | New |
| National Freedom Party | 157 | 0.04 | +0.01 | 0 | 0 |
| International Revelation Congress | 120 | 0.03 | New | 0 | New |
| African Content Movement | 100 | 0.03 | New | 0 | New |
| Total | 396,679 | 100.00 | – | 30 | 0 |
| Valid votes | 396,679 | 98.76 | | | |
| Invalid/blank votes | 4,984 | 1.24 | | | |
| Total votes | 401,663 | 100.00 | | | |
| Registered voters/turnout | 626,471 | 64.12 | | | |
Source: Election Resources
