= Mxolisa Sokatsha =

South African politician (1965–2022)

Member of the National Assembly of South Africa
- In office 22 May 2019 – 25 March 2022

Northern Cape MEC for Roads and Public Works
- In office 1 June 2017 – 7 May 2019
- Premier: Sylvia Lucas
- Preceded by: Bongiwe Mbinqo-Gigaba
- Succeeded by: Abraham Vosloo
- In office 1 March 2016 – 10 May 2017
- Premier: Sylvia Lucas
- Preceded by: Dawid Rooi
- Succeeded by: Bongiwe Mbinqo-Gigaba

Northern Cape MEC for Sports, Arts and Culture
- In office 10 May 2017 – 1 June 2017
- Premier: Sylvia Lucas
- Preceded by: Bongiwe Mbinqo-Gigaba
- Succeeded by: Bongiwe Mbinqo-Gigaba

Northern Cape MEC for Social Development
- In office 30 May 2014 – 1 March 2016
- Premier: Sylvia Lucas
- Preceded by: Tiny Chotelo
- Succeeded by: Gift van Staden

Northern Cape MEC for Health
- In office 12 May 2009 – 30 May 2014
- Premier: Sylvia Lucas; Hazel Jenkins
- Succeeded by: Mac Jack

Member of the Northern Cape Provincial Legislature
- In office 2003–2019

Personal details
- Born: Mxolisa Simon Sokatsha; 7 January 1965 Richmond, Cape Province, South Africa
- Died: 25 March 2022 (aged 57) Belmont, Northern Cape, South Africa
- Party: African National Congress
- Children: 3

Mxolisa Simon Sokatsha (7 January 1965 – 25 March 2022) was a South African accountant, educator and politician. A member of the African National Congress, he was a Member of the Executive Council in the Northern Cape from 2009 to 2019 and a Member of the Northern Cape Provincial Legislature from 2003 to 2019. In 2019 he was elected to the South African National Assembly.

== Early life and career ==
Mxolisa Simon Sokatsha was born on 7 January 1965 in the town of Richmond, then part of South Africa's Cape Province. He attended high school in Dimbaza, northwest of King William's Town. He obtained a teacher's diploma in 1990. Sokatsha worked as a teacher in Graaff-Reinet and Richmond in the early-1990s.

== Political career ==
During the 1980s, Sokatsha was involved in the establishment of the Midlands and Karoo Youth Congress. He served as the chairperson of the South African Students Congress and SANTISCO. He was the site chairperson of the South African Democratic Trade Union in Graaff-Reinet and Richmond. Sokatsha served as the first post-apartheid mayor of Richmond between 1994 and 1996. He was also the chairperson of the ANC's Pixley ka Seme region for three terms. From 1997 to 1999, he was an accountant of the Pixley ka Seme District Municipality.

== Provincial government ==
In 2003, Sokatsha was sworn in as a Member of the Northern Cape Provincial Legislature. He was appointed chairperson of the legislature's education committee, a post held until after the 2004 general election, when he was named chief whip of the ANC caucus.

After the 2009 general election, premier Hazel Jenkins appointed him Member of the Executive Council (MEC) for Health. He was sworn in on 12 May 2009. Sylvia Lucas was elected premier in June 2013, and she retained him in his post. Lucas appointed him MEC for Social Development on 30 May 2014, following the 2014 general election. He succeeded Tiny Chotelo, while Mac Jack succeeded him as MEC for Health. On 1 March 2016, Lucas reshuffled her executive, in which she appointed Sokatsha to the Roads and Public Works portfolio, succeeding Dawid Rooi. Gift van Staden became the new MEC for Social Development. On 10 May 2017 Lucas reshuffled her executive again and named him the MEC for Arts, Sports and Culture, succeeding Bongiwe Mbinqo-Gigaba. He briefly held the position until 1 June, when Lucas rescinded her decision, returning him to the Roads and Public Works portfolio.

Sokatsha was nominated to the National Assembly of South Africa following the 2019 general election and took office as an MP on 22 May 2019. He served on the Portfolio Committee on Health.

== Death ==
Sokatsha died in a car accident, 20 kilometers outside Belmont in the Northern Cape on the N12 on 25 March 2022. Northern Cape police opened a culpable homicide case.

== See also ==
- List of members of the National Assembly of South Africa who died in office
