= 2014 Northern Cape provincial election =

← 2009	7 May 2014	2019 →

All 30 seats to the Northern Cape Provincial Legislature 16 seats needed for a majority
- Turnout: 71.30%
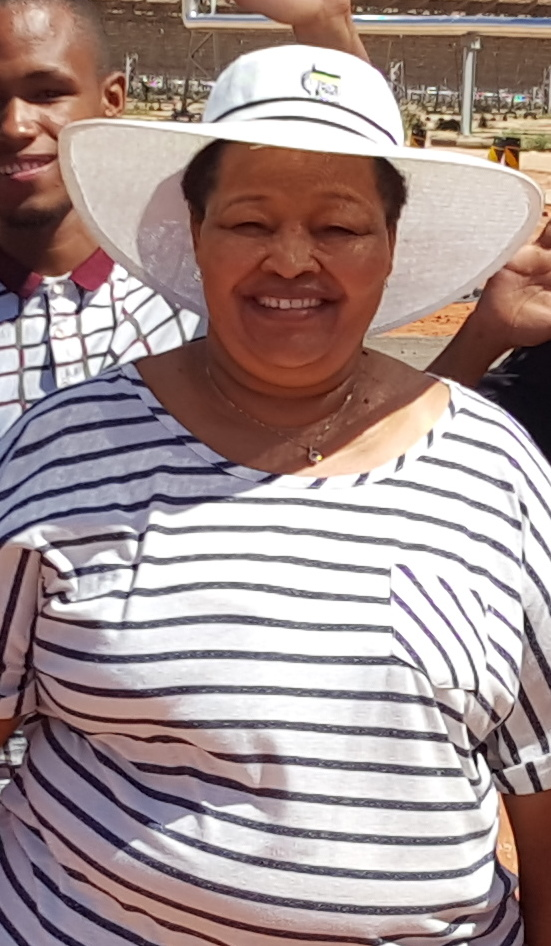

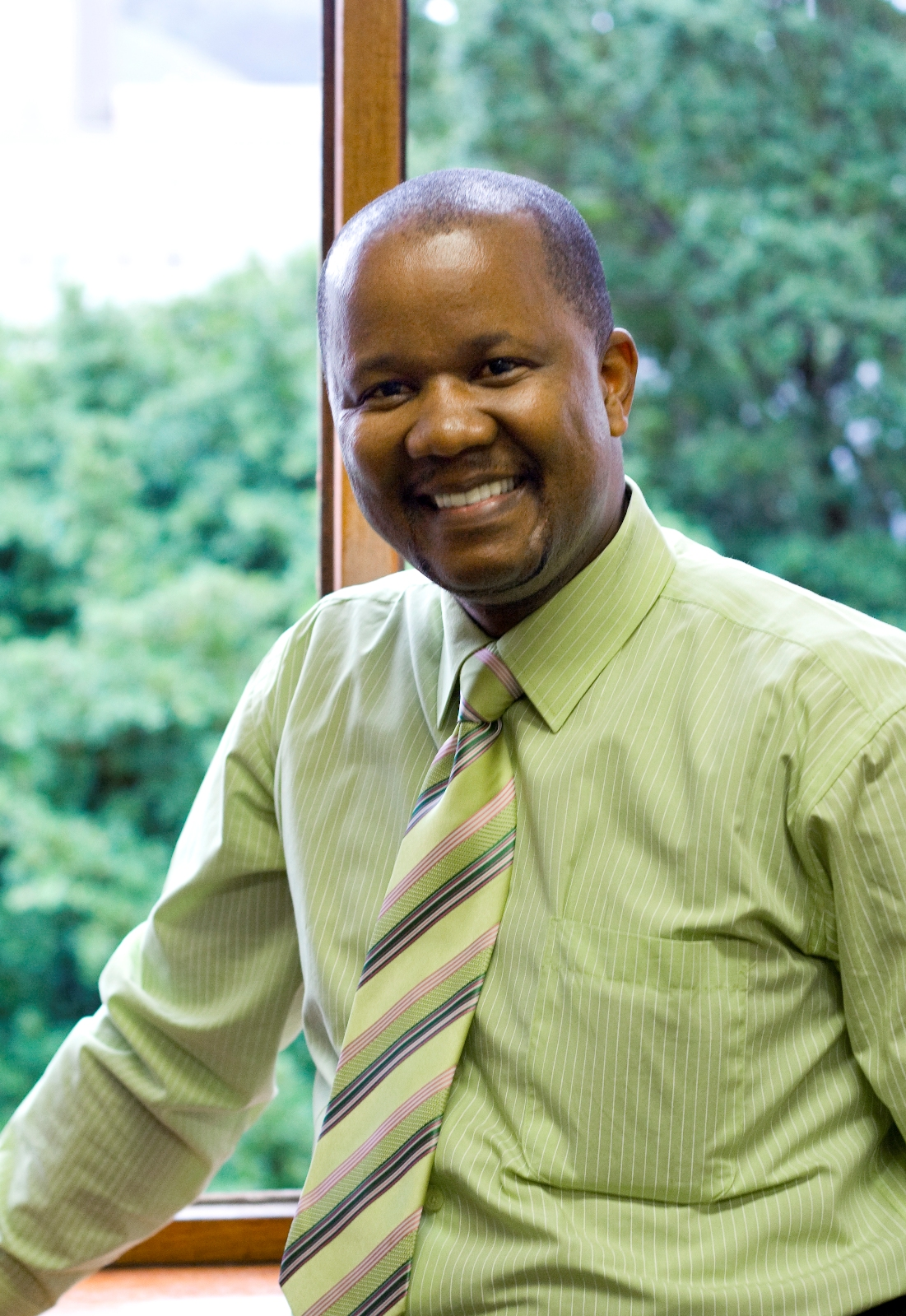
	First party	Second party
Candidate	Sylvia Lucas	Andrew Louw
Party	ANC	DA
Last election	60.75%, 19 seats	12.57%, 4 seats
Seats won	20	7
Seat change	▲1	▲3
Popular vote	272,053	100,916
Percentage	64.40%	23.89%
Swing	▲3.65pp	▲11.32pp
	Third party	Fourth party
	EFF	COPE
Candidate	Aubrey Baartman
Party	EFF	COPE
Last election	–	16.67%, 5 seats
Seats won	2	1
Seat change	New party	▼4
Popular vote	20,951	15,214
Percentage	4.96%	3.60%
Swing	New party	▼13.07pp
Premier before election
Sylvia Lucas
African National Congress
Elected Premier
Sylvia Lucas
African National Congress

The 2014 Northern Cape provincial election was held on 7 May 2014 to elect all 30 members of the Northern Cape Provincial Legislature. As with all South African provincial elections, it was held concurrent with the 2014 South African general election. The ruling ANC gained a seat, and the opposition Democratic Alliance gained three seats. The Economic Freedom Fighters, founded less than a year earlier, won two seats.

== Results ==
Party	Votes	%	Seats	+/–
African National Congress	272,053	64.40	20	+1
Democratic Alliance	100,916	23.89	7	+1
Economic Freedom Fighters	20,951	4.96	2	New
Congress of the People	15,218	3.60	1	–4
Freedom Front Plus	4,600	1.09	0	0
African Christian Democratic Party	2,421	0.57	0	0
United Christian Democratic Party	1,542	0.37	0	0
African People's Convention	1,191	0.28	0	0
Azanian People's Organisation	1,062	0.25	0	0
Patriotic Alliance	584	0.14	0	New
Independent Civic Organisation	499	0.12	0	New
Pan Africanist Congress	460	0.11	0	0
United Democratic Movement	366	0.09	0	0
Inkatha Freedom Party	239	0.06	0	0
First Nation Liberation Alliance	194	0.05	0	New
National Freedom Party	139	0.03	0	New
Total	422,435	100.00	30	0
Valid votes	422,435	98.58		
Invalid/blank votes	6,106	1.42		
Total votes	428,541	100.00		
Registered voters/turnout	601,080	71.30		
Source: Election Resources
