= 2026 Ntabankulu Primary School shooting =

2026 school shooting in Ntabankulu, South Africa

Ntabankulu Primary School shooting
- Police outside the school after the shooting
- Location: 30.95433°S 29.3066°E; Ntabankulu Primary School, Ntabankulu, Eastern Cape, South Africa
- Date: 22 January 2026 c.12:00 p.m. (SAST)
- Target: Staff
- Attack type: School shooting, mass shooting, murder–suicide
- Deaths: 4 (including the perpetrator)
- Injuries: 1
- Perpetrator: Ntuthuzelo Gcaba
- Motive: Revenge for being accused of sexual misconduct

On 22 January 2026, a school shooting occurred at the Ntabankulu Primary School in Ntabankulu, Eastern Cape, South Africa. Ntuthuzelo Gcaba, a 51-year-old former employee, stormed into Ntabankulu Primary School, where he had previously worked, and shot four teachers before committing suicide; two were killed instantly, while a third died later in hospital.

The shooting caused panic and condemnation by politicians and community leaders, with many calling for higher school security.

== Background ==
School attacks are rare in South Africa, with only six being reported since 1994, which resulted in eight deaths in total, and a sword attack occurred in August 2008 in West Rand District Municipality. Most school shootings in the country are related to organized crime.

At the time, the Ntabankulu Primary School had 1,011 enrolled pupils and 23 teachers. Between 2021 and 2025, 176 South African teachers were found guilty of sexual misconduct, involving harassment of both girls and boys.

== Shooting ==
At around 12 p.m., the shooter broke into the school by cutting through the perimeter fence. Twelve staff members at the school were having a meeting in the school cafeteria. The perpetrator then proceeded to enter the cafeteria, close the door behind him and open fire, fatally striking several teachers. The perpetrator then exited the cafeteria and shot another teacher before fatally shooting himself.

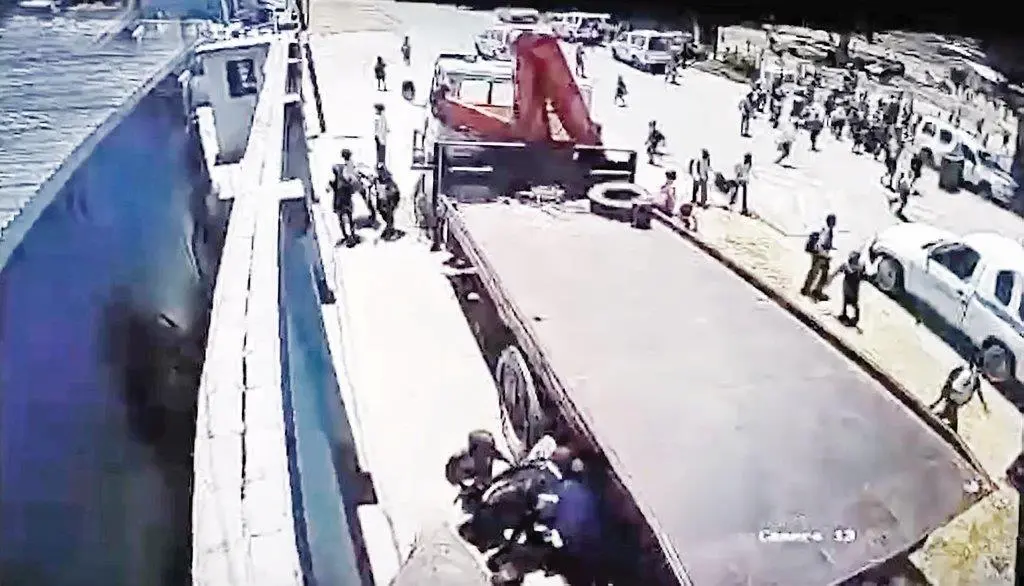
CCTV still of students fleeing outside the school

The shooting occurred in front of several students, who fled. A few students tried to stop passing vehicles for help, while some students were found hiding in shops across town and along the side of the road. Many students were left traumatized.

Four people were killed, including the perpetrator. Two people, including the perpetrator, were pronounced dead on scene, while the two other victims died in hospital, including one a day after the shooting who initially survived with critical injuries and died while being transported by ambulance to Mthatha General Hospital . A fourth female teacher was struck by gunfire but survived with serious injuries.

Police cordoned off the school as forensic experts processed the crime scene. South African Police Service confirmed that the case is being investigated under three counts of murder and an inquest docket relating to the suspect’s death. The police suspects that the shooter was also looking to kill the school principal, who was not present at the meeting.

== Victims ==
The victims were identified as 52-year-old Nontombizonke Nonkondlo, a Xhosa-language teacher and a state witness in the sexual assault case against the perpetrator; 64-year-old Nolumanyano Nonyameko Matanzima, a grade one teacher who had served at the school for 17 years and was set to retire in June; and 52-year-old Buyiswa Nkqayi-Diko, a grade three teacher and the school's head of department for the foundation phase.

== Perpetrator ==
The perpetrator was identified as 51-year-old Ntuthuzelo Gcaba, a former deputy principal at the school who was fired in 2023 after being charged with sexual assault. He was out on bail awaiting trial at the time of the shooting.

Before becoming the deputy principal, Gcaba worked as a dedicated English teacher at Ntabankulu Primary School. His transition into school leadership was marred by administrative errors according to his family. Following his firing, Gcaba faced intense personal and financial ruin. He was stripped of his salary while fighting a prolonged legal appeal process to get his job back. His family noted that the mounting pressure caused him to lose his mind. Gcaba's brother, Xolile, described Ntuthuzelo as quiet, devoted to education and seemingly incapable of violence.

Gcaba's sexual misconduct trial commenced on March 27, 2024. His last court date was on October 7, 2025, and he was scheduled to reappear on Monday January 26, 2026, four days after the shooting took place. Gcaba firmly denied the allegations, claiming that the staff was conspiring against him.

== Aftermath and reactions ==
The shooting was condemned by Oscar Mabuyane, the Premier of the Eastern Cape, Joy Maimela, the Chairperson of the Portfolio Committee on Basic Education and Fundile Gade, the provincial MEC (Member of the Executive Council) of the Eastern Cape. The South African Democratic Teachers Union's provincial secretary, Malibongwe Ntame, called for improved school security and children's rights activist Petros Majola, urged stronger access control at schools.

The husband of the victim Nontombizonke Nonkondlo, Khanyiso, who is the chief operations officer at the Ntabankulu Local Municipality has been vocal about his concerns regarding teacher and student safety after the shooting.

While Gcaba had been charged with sexual assault, this was reportedly disputed by some community members and his family. Due to this, some social media users expressed sympathy with the shooter, with some going as far as hailing Gcaba as a hero

The Eastern Cape Department of Education activated psychosocial support services and counselling for students, educators and the affected families. The school reopened four days after the shooting.

== See also ==
- Crime in South Africa
- Nic Diederichs Technical High School slashing
