= Bongiwe Mbinqo-Gigaba =

South African politician

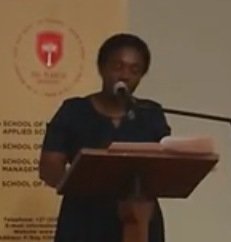

Chairperson of the Portfolio Committee on Basic Education
- In office 2 July 2019 – 28 May 2024
- Preceded by: Nomalungelo Gina
- Succeeded by: Joy Maimela

Member of the National Assembly of South Africa
- In office 22 May 2019 – 28 May 2024

Northern Cape MEC for Sports, Arts and Culture
- In office 1 June 2017 – 7 May 2019
- Premier: Sylvia Lucas
- Preceded by: Mxolisa Sokatsha
- Succeeded by: Berenice Sinexve
- In office 1 March 2016 – 10 May 2017
- Preceded by: Lebogang Motlhaping
- Succeeded by: Mxolisa Sokatsha

Member of the Northern Cape Provincial Legislature
- In office 6 May 2009 – 7 May 2019

Personal details
- Party: African National Congress
- Profession: Politician

Bongiwe Mbinqo-Gigaba is a South African politician. She is a former chairperson of the Portfolio Committee on Basic Education in the National Assembly of South Africa and a former Member of Parliament representing the African National Congress. Before serving in parliament, she was a Member of the Executive Council (MEC) in the Northern Cape provincial government.

== Political career ==
In the 2009 provincial election, Mbinqo-Gigaba was elected to the Northern Cape Provincial Legislature as a representative of the African National Congress. She was re-elected for a second term in May 2014.

On 1 March 2016, Premier Sylvia Lucas appointed her as the Member of the Executive Council (MEC) for the provincial department of Sports, Arts and Culture, succeeding Lebogang Motlhaping. She held this position until 10 May 2017, when Lucas moved her to the public works portfolio. On 1 June 2017, Lucas reversed her decision, and Mbinqo-Gigaba was back as MEC for Sports, Arts and Culture. During her tenure in the Northern Cape government, she was the province's youngest MEC. She is also the provincial chairperson of the African National Congress Youth League.

For the 8 May 2019 general election, Mbinqo-Gigaba was a candidate for the National Assembly. She was elected to Parliament at the election and was sworn into office on 22 May 2019, two weeks later. On 2 July 2019, she was elected chairperson of the Portfolio Committee on Basic Education, succeeding Nomalungelo Gina.

Mbinqo-Gigaba did not stand for reelection in the 2024 general election.
