= Gail Parker =

South African politician

Member of the Northern Cape Provincial Legislature
- In office 21 May 2014 – 7 May 2019

Member of the Northern Cape Executive Council for Finance, Economic Development and Tourism
- In office 10 May 2017 – June 2017
- Premier: Sylvia Lucas
- Preceded by: Mac Jack
- Succeeded by: Mac Jack

Personal details
- Citizenship: South Africa
- Party: African National Congress

Gail Denise Parker is a South African politician and public servant who represented the African National Congress (ANC) in the Northern Cape Provincial Legislature from 2014 to 2019. During that time, she served briefly as the Northern Cape's Member of the Executive Council (MEC) for Finance, Economic Development and Tourism from May to June 2017: she was appointed in a controversial cabinet reshuffle which the ANC later obliged Premier Sylvia Lucas to reverse. Parker trained as a teacher and entered politics through the South African Democratic Teachers Union.

== Early life and education ==
Parker was the second of three siblings – she has two brothers – and as an infant was raised in Greenpoint, Khayelitsha by her grandparents. At the age of four, she moved to Cape Town, where her parents lived and worked. She grew up on the Cape Flats and completed a bachelor's degree from the University of Cape Town. Much later in life, she also completed a doctorate in business leadership and management.

After graduating from the University of Cape Town, aged 21, she moved to present-day Northern Cape, where her parents were from, to begin a teaching job in Douglas. She was active in the South African Democratic Teachers Union (Sadtu) and served as a Sadtu branch secretary. In 1991, she moved to Kimberley to work in the education portfolio at Sadtu's provincial headquarters.

== Provincial legislature ==
In the 2014 general election, Parker was elected to represent the ANC in the Northern Cape Provincial Legislature; she was ranked eighth on the ANC's provincial party list. She served a single five-year term in the seat.

In the middle of the term, on 10 May 2017, Sylvia Lucas, then the Premier of the Northern Cape, announced a controversial cabinet reshuffle which saw Parker join the Northern Cape Executive Council as MEC for Finance, Economic Development and Tourism, replacing Mac Jack. Transport MEC Pauline Williams was replaced by Alexandra Beukes in the same reshuffle. The Northern Cape branch of the ANC said that it had not been consulted about the reshuffle and responded with "absolute disgust", calling the reshuffle "grossly irresponsible, reckless and self-serving" and alleging that it constituted an attempt by Lucas to influence the outcomes of a party elective conference scheduled for the next weekend. The provincial party called for Lucas to reverse the reshuffle and the ANC National Executive Committee ultimately intervened to instruct her to do so, agreeing that there had been insufficient consultation with the party. On 1 June, Lucas announced that she would comply, meaning that Parker lost her new position.

Parker did not seek re-election to the provincial legislature in 2019, but instead became the technical adviser to the Northern Cape MEC for Transport, Safety and Liaison. She remained in that position as of early 2021.

== Personal life ==
Parker has two sons.
