= Pauline Williams =

South African politician

Northern Cape MEC for Environmental Affairs
- In office 15 February 2018 – 7 May 2019
- Premier: Sylvia Lucas
- Preceded by: Tiny Chotelo
- Succeeded by: Position abolished

Northern Cape MEC for Transport, Liaison and Safety
- In office 1 June 2017 – 15 February 2018
- Premier: Sylvia Lucas
- Preceded by: Alexandra Beukes
- Succeeded by: Lebogang Motlhaping
- In office 3 March 2016 – 10 May 2017
- Premier: Sylvia Lucas
- Preceded by: Martha Bartlett
- Succeeded by: Alexandra Beukes

Northern Cape MEC for Sport, Arts and Culture
- In office 12 May 2009 – 6 May 2014
- Premier: Hazel Jenkins
- Preceded by: Archie Lucas
- Succeeded by: Lebogang Motlhaping

Member of the Northern Cape Provincial Legislature
- In office 27 October 2015 – 7 May 2019
- In office 2004–2014

Personal details
- Party: African National Congress
- Education: University of the Western Cape; University of South Africa
- Profession: Politician

Pauline Jeanette Williams is a retired South African politician. A member of the African National Congress, she was elected to the Northern Cape Provincial Legislature in 2004. In 2009, she was appointed as the Member of the Executive Council (MEC) for Sport, Arts and Culture. She left the legislature in 2014, only for her to return in 2015. She was then made MEC for Transport, Liaison and Safety in 2016. Williams was briefly out of the post in May 2017. In February 2018, she was made the MEC for Environmental Affairs. Williams left the legislature again in 2019.

== Early life and education ==
Williams was born in Springbok in South Africa's former Cape Province. In 1978, she earned a senior certificate from Northern Paarl High School. Williams studied for a BA degree at the University of the Western Cape between 1979 and 1981. In 1982, she earned a diploma in higher education at the University of South Africa. She obtained a B.Ed Degree at UNISA in 1991. Williams did a Diploma in Financial Management at APAC in 2000.

== Career ==
=== Teaching career ===
From 1983 to 1996, Williams was an educator at Van Wyk Senior Secondary School in her home town. In 1996, she became the Namaqua regional coordinator of adult basic education and training. She held this position until 2000, when she was appointed as regional director of education. She served in this post until 2004. In this position, Williams was also a member of the Management Team at the Northern Cape Department of Education.

=== Politics ===
Between 1995 and 1997, she was a councillor of the Springbok Transitional Municipality and the Namaqua District Municipality. Williams was elected to the Northern Cape Provincial Legislature in 2004 as a member of the African National Congress. She served on various committees in the legislature.

Williams is a senior member of the ANC. She was an additional member of the party's regional executive committee in Namaqualand during her time as secretary. She also served on the party's provincial executive committee as an ex officio member. Williams also served as secretary of the ANC Women's League regional structure in Namaqua. She was an additional member and the deputy chairperson before she became the provincial chairperson of the women's league. Williams had also served on the National Executive Committee (NEC) of the women's league.

=== Provincial government ===
After the 2009 general election, she was appointed as Member of the Executive Council (MEC) for Sport, Arts and Culture, replacing Archie Lucas. She was re-appointed to this role in 2013 by the newly elected premier, Sylvia Lucas. For the 2014 general election, Williams was ranked 22nd on the ANC's list. The ANC only won 20 seats, meaning that Williams had lost her seat. Lebogang Motlhaping replaced her as MEC for Sport, Arts and Culture. However, she returned to the provincial legislature on 27 October 2015. In an executive council reshuffle in March 2016, she was appointed as the MEC for Transport, Liaison and Safety, succeeding Martha Bartlett.

Ahead of the ANC's elective conference in May 2017, she emerged as a supporter of Zamani Saul's campaign for provincial chair. On the eve of the conference, Lucas (also a candidate for provincial chair) removed Williams from the executive. The ANC condemned Lucas' decision. On 1 June, Lucas rescinded her decision, returning Williams back to the executive council. In February 2018, she was appointed MEC for Environmental Affairs.

Williams retired from politics in 2019.
