= Patrick Mabilo =

South African politician

Executive Mayor of the Sol Plaatje Local Municipality
- In office 28 November 2018 – 23 November 2021
- Preceded by: Pule Thabane
- Succeeded by: Kagisho Dante Sonyoni

Member of the National Assembly of South Africa
- In office 21 May 2014 – 17 October 2017

Northern Cape MEC for Environment and Nature Conservation
- In office 5 June 2013 – 21 May 2014
- Premier: Sylvia Lucas
- Preceded by: Sylvia Lucas
- Succeeded by: Tiny Chotelo

Northern Cape MEC for Transport, Safety and Liaison
- In office 11 May 2009 – 5 June 2013
- Premier: Hazel Jenkins
- Preceded by: Unknown
- Succeeded by: Mac Jack

Member of the Northern Cape Provincial Legislature
- In office 27 February 2018 – October 2018
- In office 6 May 2009 – 6 May 2014

Personal details
- Born: Solomon Patrick Mabilo
- Party: African National Congress

Solomon Patrick Mabilo is a South African politician from the Northern Cape who served as the Executive Mayor of the Sol Plaatje Local Municipality from 2018 to 2021. A member of the African National Congress (ANC), he served as a Member of the National Assembly from 2014 to 2017. He was a Member of Northern Cape Provincial Legislature from 2009 to 2014 and again in 2018. Within the Northern Cape provincial government, he served as the MEC for Transport, Safety and Liaison from 2009 to 2013, and was the MEC for Environment and Nature Conservation between 2013 and 2014.

== Biography ==
Mabilo was born in Galeshewe, Kimberley. He soon became involved with the South African Democratic Teachers Union. He later became a member of the ANC and served in ANC structures.

Mabilo was elected to the Northern Cape Provincial Legislature in April 2009. Premier Hazel Jenkins appointed him to the post of MEC for Transport, Safety and Liaison. He was sworn into the position on 11 May 2009.

In June 2013, Sylvia Lucas became premier. She appointed him to the post of MEC for Environment and Nature Conservation.

In May 2014, Mabilo was elected to the National Assembly. The Hawks soon announced that they were investigating him on fraud charges. He resigned as an MP in October 2017. He soon became an MPL again in February 2018, filling the vacancy created by the resignation of Alvin Botes.

In September 2018, Mabilo was announced as the incoming mayor, succeeding Mangaliso Matika, who resigned on 26 September. At an October special council meeting, Pule Thabane was elected mayor over Mabilo. The ANC soon expelled the councillors who voted to elect Thabane. Mabilo was elected Executive Mayor in November 2018.

After the 2021 local elections, Kagisho Dante Sonyoni was elected to succeed Mabilo as Executive Mayor of the Sol Plaatje Local Municipality.
