= Nomalungelo Gina =

South African politician (born 1969)

The Honourable Nomalungelo Gina MP

Deputy Minister of Science, Technology and Innovation
- Incumbent
- Assumed office 30 June 2024
- President: Cyril Ramaphosa
- Minister: Blade Nzimande
- Preceded by: Buti Manamela (for Higher Education, Science and Technology)

Deputy Minister of Trade and Industry
- In office 29 May 2019 – 19 June 2024 Serving with Fikile Majola
- President: Cyril Ramaphosa
- Minister: Ebrahim Patel
- Preceded by: Bulelani Magwanishe
- Succeeded by: Andrew Whitfield; Zuko Godlimpi

Chairperson of the Portfolio Committee on Basic Education
- In office 24 June 2014 – 7 May 2019
- Speaker: Baleka Mbete
- Preceded by: Hope Malgas
- Succeeded by: Bongiwe Mbinqo-Gigaba

Member of the National Assembly

Assembly Member for KwaZulu-Natal
- Incumbent
- Assumed office 6 May 2009

Personal details
- Born: 25 October 1969 (age 56) Ndwedwe, Natal Province; South Africa
- Party: African National Congress
- Other political affiliations: South African Communist Party
- Spouse: Cedric Gina (died 2019)
- Education: Inanda Seminary School
- Alma mater: University of Zululand

Nomalungelo Gina (born 25 October 1969) is a South African politician from KwaZulu-Natal who is currently serving as the Deputy Minister of Science, Technology and Innovation since June 2024. She has represented the African National Congress in the National Assembly since May 2009.

A teacher by profession, Gina entered politics through the South African Democratic Teachers Union and chaired the Portfolio Committee on Basic Education during the Fifth Parliament. She joined the national executive in May 2019 when President Cyril Ramaphosa appointed her as Deputy Minister of Trade and Industry. She held that office until after the May 2024 general election, when she was appointed to her current position.

== Early life and career ==
Born on 25 October 1969, Gina is from Ndwedwe in the former Natal Province (now KwaZulu-Natal). She matriculated at the Inanda Seminary School and completed a teaching degree at the University of Zululand. Thereafter she was teacher in schools in Uthungulu District for more than 15 years. During that time she entered politics as a member, site steward, and provincial leader of the South African Democratic Teachers Union. She was also a member of the Musa Dladla regional branch of the African National Congress (ANC) in Richards Bay.

== Legislator: 2009–2019 ==
Gina joined the National Assembly of South Africa in the April 2009 general election, standing as an ANC candidate in the KwaZulu-Natal constituency. During the Fourth Parliament, she was a member of the Portfolio Committee on Higher Education and Training and an ANC whip in the Portfolio Committee on Basic Education.

After her re-election to the National Assembly in the May 2014 general election, the ANC announced that it would nominate her to succeed Hope Malgas as chairperson of the basic education committee, with Pinky Mokoto entering as the ANC's new whip. She was formally elected to the chairmanship on 24 June 2014, and she held the chair throughout the Fifth Parliament. During that time, Gina was injured in a car accident while on a committee oversight visit to schools in the Cape Winelands. ANC representative Timothy Khoza died in the accident, and opposition politicians Ian Ollis and Cynthia Majeke were also injured.

In the Fifth Parliament Gina was also the convenor of the social cluster of parliamentary committees. In addition, she served on the provincial executive committee of the South African Communist Party (SACP) in KwaZulu-Natal. The SACP's 8th provincial congress, held in Pongola in August 2018, elected Gina to succeed Nomvuzo Shabalala as SACP deputy provincial chairperson. She deputises provincial chairperson James Nxumalo.

== Deputy minister: 2019–present ==
Gina was re-elected to the National Assembly in the May 2019 general election, now ranked third on the ANC's party list for the KwaZulu-Natal constituency. Announcing his cabinet on 29 May 2019, President Cyril Ramaphosa appointed Gina as one of two Deputy Ministers of Trade and Industry. In the newly enlarged Department of Trade, Industry and Competition, she served under Minister Ebrahim Patel and alongside trade unionist Fikile Majola.

When the KwaZulu-Natal branch of the ANC elected its candidates for the next general election, Gina was ranked first in the province. She was re-elected to her National Assembly seat when the election was held in May 2024, and on 30 June 2024 President Ramaphosa appointed her as Deputy Minister of Science, Technology and Innovation under Minister Blade Nzimande. She was sworn in on 3 July.

== Personal life ==
Gina's husband was the ANC politician and trade unionist Cedric Gina, a former president of the National Union of Metalworkers; he died in February 2019. She has two sons.
