= Grizelda Cjiekella =

Premier of the Northern Cape
- Acting
- In office 20 February 2012 – 2 April 2013
- Preceded by: Hazel Jenkins
- Succeeded by: Sylvia Lucas

Northern Cape MEC for Education
- In office 12 May 2009 – 28 August 2015
- Premier: Hazel Jenkins; Herself; Sylvia Lucas
- Preceded by: John Block
- Succeeded by: Martha Bartlett

Member of the Northern Cape Provincial Legislature
- In office December 2003 – 28 August 2015

Personal details
- Born: 14 April 1970
- Died: 28 August 2015 (aged 45) Kimberley, Northern Cape, South Africa
- Party: African National Congress
- Education: University of the Free State

Grizelda Boniwe Cjiekella was MEC (Member of the Executive Council) for Education in the Northern Cape Province, South Africa, and served as Acting Premier of the province from 20 February 2012 until 2 April 2013.

== Early life and education ==
Cjiekella was born into a family of Xhosa background and grew up in Pabalello Township in Upington. She attended the Paballelo Senior Secondary school, returning there later as a teacher. Having matriculated, Cjiekella enrolled at the University of the Western Cape. Her studies were interrupted by involvement in the liberation struggle movement. She afterwards completed the following courses at the University of the Free State: Research and Management, Law Making and Oversight, Strategic Planning, Capacity Building in Committees and House proceedings and Local Government (MFMA) Integrated Performance Management Act.

== Political career ==
Cjiekella’s involvement in politics, many have recalled, dated from her school days when she was a “vibrant and outspoken” SRC member. In 1986 she was elected branch chairperson of the ANC Youth Congress in Upington, a role she fulfilled until 1988. Concurrently and up to 1990 she was a member of the Civic Organisation; becoming branch chairperson of the ANC Women's Congress in Upington (1988-1989). Her position in African National Congress structures was consolidated in her becoming ANC Branch Executive Deputy Chairperson (1990-1994), ANC Regional Deputy Chairperson (1995-1996), ANC Acting Regional Chairperson (1996-1997), ANC Women's Provincial Secretary (1997-2003), and ANC Women's League Provincial Deputy Chairperson (2003-2008). She was currently the ANC Women's League Provincial Chairperson and also a PEC and PWC member of the ANC. She served in the ANC Women's League NEC by virtue of being the Provincial Chairperson.

Cjiekella was deployed to the Northern Cape Provincial Legislature as a Member of the Provincial Legislature (MPL) in December 2003. The following year she became the Deputy Speaker of the Northern Cape Provincial Legislature. She held the position until April 2009 when she was appointed MEC for Education in the Province.

== Acting Premier of the Northern Cape ==
After Northern Cape premier Hazel Jenkins collapsed, suffering a stroke, in 2012, the Executive Council of the Province met on 20 February, unanimously resolving to appoint Grizelda Cjiekella as Acting Premier for the duration of Premier Jenkins’ incapacity leave.

Her term as Acting Premier ended on 2 April 2013 when Hazel Jenkins officially stepped down from the post of Premier of the Northern Cape and was to be succeeded by Sylvia Lucas, the Provincial Minister for Environmental Affairs.

== Death ==
Grizelda Cjiekella died unexpectedly while in hospital in the city of Kimberley on 28 August 2015.
