= Northern Cape Department of Environment and Nature Conservation =

Government department in South Africa

Department overview
- Jurisdiction: Government of the Northern Cape
- Headquarters: 90 Long Street, Kimberley, 8300
- Minister responsible: Mase Manopole, MEC for Land Reform, Agriculture and Nature Conservation and Environmental Affairs
- Department executive: Mandla Ndzilili, Head of Department
- Website: denc.ncpg.gov.za

The Northern Cape Department of Environment and Nature Conservation is the department of the Government of the Northern Cape. It is responsible for protecting, conserving and improving the Northern Cape's environment and natural resources. The political head of the department is MEC Mase Manopole. Manopole also oversees the Department of Agriculture, Land Reform and Rural Development.
