= Northern Cape Department of Roads and Public Works =

Department of Roads and Public Works of the Northern Cape Province

Department overview
- Jurisdiction: Government of the Northern Cape
- Headquarters: 9-11 Stokroos Street, Squarehill Park, Kimberley, 8301
- Minister responsible: Fufe Makatong, Northern Cape MEC for Roads and Public Works
- Department executive: Kholekile Nogwili, Head of Department
- Website: ncrpw.ncpg.gov.za

The Northern Cape Department of Roads and Public Works is the department of the Government of the Northern Cape responsible for maintaining public infrastructure within the Northern Cape province of South Africa. The MEC of this department is Fufe Makatong.
