= Northern Cape Department of Education =

Education Department of the Northern Cape Province

Department overview
- Formed: 1994
- Jurisdiction: Government of the Northern Cape
- Headquarters: 156 Barkly Road, Homestead, Kimberley, 8301
- Minister responsible: Zolile Monakali, Northern Cape MEC for Education
- Department executive: Moira Marais, Head of Department
- Website: ncdoe.ncpg.gov.za

The Northern Cape Department of Education is the department of the Government of the Northern Cape responsible for primary and secondary education within the Northern Cape province of South Africa. The political leader of the department is the Member of the Executive Council (MEC) for Education; as of June 2024 this position is held by Abraham Vosloo.
