= Kgomotso Mohapanele =

South African politician

Member of the Northern Cape Provincial Legislature
- In office 8 February 2024 – 28 May 2024
- Preceded by: Grantham Steenkamp

Personal details
- Born: Kgomotso Charity Mohapanele
- Party: Democratic Alliance
- Profession: Politician

Kgomotso Charity Mohapanele is a South African politician who served as a Democratic Alliance Member of the Northern Cape Provincial Legislature from February until May 2024.

== Political career ==
Mohapanele formerly served as a Democratic Alliance councillor in the Sol Plaatje Local Municipality centered around Kimberley. On 8 February 2024, she was sworn in as a member of the Northern Cape Provincial Legislature for the DA, filling the casual vacancy that arose from the termination of Grantham Steenkamp's party membership.

She was not elected to a full term in the 2024 provincial election and left the legislature.
