= Mac Jack =

South African politician (1965–2020)

Northern Cape MEC for Education
- In office 29 May 2019 – 12 August 2020
- Premier: Zamani Saul
- Preceded by: Martha Bartlett
- Succeeded by: Zolile Monakali

Northern Cape MEC for Finance, Economic Development and Tourism
- In office 1 June 2017 – 29 May 2019
- Premier: Sylvia Lucas
- Preceded by: Gail Parker
- Succeeded by: Maruping Lekwene
- In office 1 March 2016 – 10 May 2017
- Premier: Sylvia Lucas
- Preceded by: John Block
- Succeeded by: Gail Parker

Northern Cape MEC for Health
- In office 30 May 2014 – 1 March 2016
- Premier: Sylvia Lucas
- Preceded by: Mxolisa Sokatsha
- Succeeded by: Lebogang Motlhaping

Northern Cape MEC for Transport, Safety and Liaison
- In office 5 June 2013 – 30 May 2014
- Premier: Sylvia Lucas
- Preceded by: Patrick Mabilo
- Succeeded by: Martha Bartlett

Member of the Northern Cape Provincial Legislature
- In office 4 June 2013 – 12 August 2020

Personal details
- Born: McCollen Ntsikelelo Jack; 8 March 1965 Graaff-Reinet, Cape Province, South Africa
- Died: 12 August 2020 (aged 55) Mediclinic Gariep Hospital, Kimberley, Northern Cape, South Africa
- Cause of death: COVID-19
- Party: African National Congress
- Children: 7
- Education: Masibulele College of Education; Rand Afrikaans University; University of the Witwatersrand; University of Stellenbosch
- Profession: Educator; Politician

McCollen Ntsikelelo Jack (8 March 1965 – 12 August 2020), known as Mac Jack, was a South African educator and politician. A member of the African National Congress, Jack was appointed to the Northern Cape Provincial Legislature in June 2013. He served as the Member of the Executive Council (MEC) for Transport, Safety and Liaison from June 2013 until May 2014, when he was appointed the MEC for Health. Following a cabinet reshuffle in March 2016, he was appointed the MEC for Finance, Economic Development and Tourism. Jack held the position until his appointment as MEC for Education in May 2019, despite him briefly being demoted from the Executive Council in May 2017.

== Early life and education ==
McCollen Ntsikelelo Jack was born on 8 March 1965 in the town of Graaff-Reinet, then part of South Africa's Cape Province. He matriculated from Thubalethu High School in Fort Beaufort in 1984. He went on to study at the Masibulele College of Education where he received a teacher's diploma. He then obtained a further diploma in educational management from the Rand Afrikaans University. From the University of the Witwatersrand, he attained a CPMD-Finance certificate, completed a Housing Policy Development Programme (HPDP), and received a certificate in governance and leadership. In 2013, Jack received his honours degree in public administration from the University of Stellenbosch. At the time of his death, he was busy fulfilling his master's degree from Wits University.

== Career ==
Jack was first employed as a teacher at Isibane Primary School in his hometown. Later on, he began working as the principal at the Lillian Noveve Combined School in Victoria West. Not long after, the Eastern Cape Department of Education appointed him as an assistant chief education specialist. In 1997, the Northern Cape government appointed him as the deputy director-general of the provincial Department of Housing and Local Government in De Aar. He was also the municipal manager of the Pixley ka Seme District Municipality.

== Political career ==
Jack was a long-standing member of the African National Congress. He served on the party's regional structure as an additional member, the treasurer, the secretary, prior to being elected chairperson of the region, a post he held for a decade. Jack had also served as a member of both the ANC's provincial executive committee and the provincial working committee.

== Provincial government ==
On 4 June 2013, Jack was appointed a member of the provincial legislature. Newly elected premier Sylvia Lucas appointed him the Member of the Executive Council (MEC) for Transport, Safety and Liaison on 5 June, succeeding Patrick Mabilo. He held the position until after the 2014 general election, when Lucas moved him to the Health portfolio of the executive. Jack succeeded Mxolisa Sokatsha on 30 May, while Martha Bartlett became the new Transport, Safety and Liaison MEC. Lucas reshuffled her cabinet on 1 March 2016 and appointed him the MEC for Finance, Economic Development and Tourism, succeeding John Block. Lebogang Motlhaping succeeded him as Health MEC. In May 2017, Lucas removed him from the Executive Council and replaced him with Gail Parker. She reversed her decision on 1 June 2017. Following the 2019 general election, Zamani Saul was elected the provincial premier. He named him the MEC for Education. He was sworn in 29 May and succeeded Martha Bartlett. Maruping Lekwene took over as Finance MEC.

== Death ==
In August 2020, Jack tested positive for COVID-19 amidst the COVID-19 pandemic in South Africa. He died from it on 12 August, at Mediclinic Gariep in the provincial capital Kimberley, aged 55. He was survived by his wife, seven children and nine grandchildren. His funeral was held on 16 August, in his hometown.
