= Northern Cape Department of Economic Development and Tourism =

South African state government department

Department overview
- Jurisdiction: Government of the Northern Cape
- Headquarters: Metlife Towers, 13th Floor, Cnr Stead & Knight Streets, Kimberley, 8301
- Minister responsible: Abraham Vosloo, Northern Cape MEC for Finance, Economic Development and Tourism
- Department executive: G Mabilo, Head of Department
- Website: www.northern-cape.gov.za/dedat/

The Northern Cape Department of Economic Development and Tourism is the department of the South African Government of the Northern Cape responsible for economic development and economic planning as well as promoting and developing tourism within the Northern Cape province of South Africa. The MEC of the department is Abraham Vosloo.
