= List of heritage sites in Richmond, Northern Cape =

This is a list of the heritage sites in Richmond, Northern Cape (Pixley ka Seme District Municipality) as recognized by the South African Heritage Resource Agency.

SAHRA identifier	Site name	Description	Town	District	NHRA status	Coordinates	Image
9/2/078/0003	Dutch Reformed Church, Loop Street, Richmond	Large church building with neo-Gothic elements, complex saddle roof with barge-boarding at covered g Designed by J L Leeb. Corner stone laid in 1844, inaugurated 1847, pulpit designed by Anton Anreith, Type of site: Church Current use: Religious: Church. .	Richmond	Richmond	Provincial Heritage Site	31°24′47″S 23°56′48″E	Large church building with neo-Gothic elements, complex saddle roof with barge-boarding at covered g Designed by J L Leeb. Corner stone laid in 1844, inaugurated 1847, pulpit designed by Anton Anreith, Type of site: Church Current use: Religious: Church. .
9/2/078/0004	De Oude Dak, 237 Paul Street, Richmond	It is a single storey building of U form with a corrugated iron saddle roof and central gable on the This impressive Cape Dutch style house was built in the middle of the 19th century. A board carrying Type of site: Commercial Current use: Commercial – Restaurant. . De Oude Dak is one of only three known Cape Dutch style buildings in the Northern Cape and is the ol	Richmond	Richmond	Provincial Heritage Site	31°25′00″S 23°56′56″E	It is a single storey building of U form with a corrugated iron saddle roof and central gable on the This impressive Cape Dutch style house was built in the middle of the 19th century. A board carrying Type of site: Commercial Current use: Commercial – Restaurant. . De Oude Dak is one of only three known Cape Dutch style buildings in the Northern Cape and is the ol
9/2/078/0005	214 Paul Street, Richmond	6 bay with garage door on right under same roof. Hipped roof, loft gablet on left. Straight verandah Type of site: House Current use: Residential. . A well-preserved, handsome dwelling, one of the oldest houses in the town and an asset to the architecture	Richmond	Richmond	Register	31°24′56″S 23°56′59″E	Upload Photo
9/2/078/0012-001	247 Church Street, Richmond	Karoo type 3 bay on street, simple parapet. High stone and concrete stoep. Rough plastered walls. Wi Type of site: House Current use: Residential. . One of the few relatively unspoilt Karoo type houses in Richmond and typical of this street	Richmond	Richmond	Register	31°24′48″S 23°56′48″E	Upload Photo
9/2/078/0012-002	170 Pienaar Street, Richmond	4 bay on street. Low hipped roof. Raised stone stoep. 3x3 double door, 3 paned fanlight, narrower do Type of site: House Current use: Residential. . A trim cottage typical of the local architecture.	Richmond	Richmond	Register	31°24′50″S 23°56′48″E	Upload Photo
9/2/078/0012-006	208 Paul Street, Richmond	Main building is 3 bay house. Hipped roof. Stone stoep. Old double door with fanlight. Shuttered win Type of site: House Current use: Morgue. . In scale and style these buildings fit in with the architectural environment.	Richmond	Richmond	Register	31°25′01″S 23°56′45″E	Upload Photo
9/2/078/0012-007	258 Church Street, Richmond	3 bay on street. Hipped roof. Ogee wrap-around verandah on rounded pillars, tile topped wall with in April 1885 Type of site: House Current use: Residential. . An attractive house enhancing the architectural environment.	Richmond	Richmond	Register	31°24′53″S 23°56′48″E	Upload Photo
9/2/078/0012-008	60 Loop Street, Richmond	Large 6 bay on street. Hipped corrugated iron rof. Wrap around verandah with bullnose roof on rounde Type of site: House Current use: Residential. . An attractive unspoilt building enhancing the architectural environment	Richmond	Richmond	Register	31°24′48″S 23°56′28″E	Upload Photo
9/2/078/0012-009	152 Pienaar Street, Richmond	4 bay on street. Hipped roof, ogee gutters. Straight hipped verandah roof on rounded pillars. Low co Type of site: House Current use: Residential. . Contributes to the architectural environment	Richmond	Richmond	Register	31°24′50″S 23°56′35″E	Upload Photo
9/2/078/0012-010	148 Pienaar Street, Richmond	3 bay on street. Hipped corrugated iron roof, ogee gutters. Straight corrugated iron verandah roof o Type of site: House Current use: Residential. . An attractive house enhancing the architectural environment.	Richmond	Richmond	Register	31°24′50″S 23°56′34″E	Upload Photo
9/2/078/0012-011	15 Loop Street, Richmond	4 bay on Loop St. 3 bay on Spring St. Low hipped roof, ogee fugtters, High foundation stoep with hig Type of site: House Current use: Residential. . A very fine building.	Richmond	Richmond	Register	31°24′48″S 23°56′27″E	Upload Photo
9/2/078/0012-012	260 Hope Street, Richmond	Large double storey. Hipped roof. Wrap around upper verandah under house roof with precast pillars o Type of site: House Current use: Residential. . A good example of its period	Richmond	Richmond	Register	31°24′46″S 23°56′28″E	Upload Photo
9/2/078/0012-013	19 Loop Street, Richmond	Hall, long 3 bay on street. Corrugated iron saddle roof. Covered end gable with finial, barge boardi Type of site: Cultural Current use: Cultural: Museum. . A good building enhancing the streetscape	Richmond	Richmond	Register	31°24′48″S 23°56′28″E	Upload Photo
9/2/078/0012-014	156 Pienaar Street, Richmond	Hipped corruged iron roof. Straight hipped wrap around verandah roof on rounded pillars and straight Type of site: Commercial / Residential Current use: Storeroom/hotel rooms. . Altered building, facebricks should be painted	Richmond	Richmond	Register	31°24′50″S 23°56′38″E	Upload Photo
9/2/078/0012-015	14 Spring Street, Richmond	Symmetrical 3 bay, extension of right. High hipped corrugated iron roof. Low parapet, small pediment Type of site: House Current use: Residential. . Late 19th or early 20th century.	Richmond	Richmond	Register	31°24′48″S 23°56′55″E	Upload Photo
9/2/078/0012-016	158 Pienaar Street, Richmond	3 bay on street. Hipped roof. Wrap around verandah with straight corrugated iron roof on precast mou Type of site: House Current use: Residential. . This house is sympathetic to the architectural environment.	Richmond	Richmond	Register	31°24′49″S 23°56′35″E	Upload Photo
9/2/078/0012-017	120 Pienaar Street, Richmond	3-bay. Hipped roof. Wrap-around verandah, ogee verandah roof, wooden posts, fretwork frieze, modern Type of site: House Current use: Residential. . Enhances the architectural environment.	Richmond	Richmond	Register	31°24′50″S 23°56′35″E	Upload Photo
9/2/078/0012-018	56 Loop Street, Richmond	3 bay on street. Low hipped corrugated iron roof. Straight corrugated iron verandah roof on square s Type of site: House Current use: Residential. . In keeping with street's architecture	Richmond	Richmond	Register	31°24′47″S 23°56′28″E	Upload Photo
9/2/078/0012-019	26 Loop Street, Richmond	3 bay on street. Low pitched corrugated iron hipped roof. Hipped ogee verandah on plain wooden post. Type of site: House Current use: Residential. . Was possibly originally a flat roofed Karoo type house. A good house that contributes to the archite	Richmond	Richmond	Register	31°24′48″S 23°56′28″E	Upload Photo
9/2/078/0012-020	Paul Street, Richmond	3-bay Paul Street, 5-bay Pienaar Street. Hipped corrugated-iron roof. Straight wrap around verandah Type of site: House Current use: Morgue. . 19th century. A pleasantly proportioned building, a landmark.	Richmond	Richmond	Register	31°24′55″S 23°57′19″E	Upload Photo
9/2/078/0012-021	216 Paul Street, Richmond	2 dwellings, semi-detached Karoo type on street. Heavy moulded parapet. Right unit has 3 panelled do Type of site: House Current use: Residential. . Should be ugraded and preserved	Richmond	Richmond	Register	31°24′54″S 23°57′00″E	Upload Photo
9/2/078/0012-022	160 Pienaar Street, Richmond	3 bay. Hipped roof. Straight verandah roof on squared fluted pillars. Left end glazed in with large Type of site: House Current use: Residential. . Contributes to the architectural environment	Richmond	Richmond	Register	31°24′50″S 23°56′47″E	Upload Photo
9/2/078/0012-023	241 Paul Street, Richmond	3-bay, hipped roof, ogee verandah, latice work supports and wooden brackets, with latice frieze work Type of site: House Current use: Residential. . 19th or early 20th century	Richmond	Richmond	Register	31°24′57″S 23°56′58″E	Upload Photo
9/2/078/0012-024	144 Pienaar Street, Richmond	Long 6 bay on street. Corrugated iron saddle roof, shouldered end gable with mock chimney. Large dou Type of site: Commercial Current use: Commercial. In keeping with te streetscape and valuable due to its proximity to other worthwhile buildings.	Richmond	Richmond	Register	31°24′49″S 23°56′36″E	Upload Photo
9/2/078/0012-025	129 Pienaar Street, Richmond	Double storey building. Hipped tiled roof, Cape Dutch Revival gable with narrow vent. Upper verandah Type of site: Commercial Current use: Commercial: Bank. . It enhances the architectural environment	Richmond	Richmond	Register	31°24′51″S 23°56′56″E	Upload Photo
9/2/078/0012-026	140 Pienaar Street, Richmond	Low hipped corrugated iron roof, ogee gutters, cast iron rainwater heads. Straight sloping corrugate Dated 1878. built as a shop by Mosenthals of Cape Town Type of site: Commercial Current use: Commercial. . Largely in its original state and is of local historical and architectural value.	Richmond	Richmond	Register	31°24′50″S 23°56′34″E	Upload Photo
9/2/078/0012-027	132 Pienaar Street, Richmond	Saddle-roof, covered end-gables with barge-boarding, rainwater heads. Buttressed walls, stone found Current use: Religious. . Early 20th century? An attractive building that enhances the streetscape.	Richmond	Richmond	Register	31°24′50″S 23°56′34″E	Upload Photo
9/2/078/0012-028	Eastern end of Pienaar Street, Richmond	Wood-and-iron bridge built in 1883 across the Ongers River at eastern end of Pienaar Street. Built in 1883, was called after the then Prime Minister of the Cape Colony. Type of site: Bridge Current use: Structural: Bridge. Built in 1883	Richmond	Richmond	Register	31°24′51″S 23°56′57″E	Upload Photo
9/2/078/0012-029	22 Spring Street, Richmond	Cape Cottage style 4 bay. Corrugated iron saddle roof, ogee gutters. Mock chimneys, edge moulding. L Type of site: House Current use: Residential. . One of the very few unspoilt Cape Cottages in Richmond and an asset to the environment.	Richmond	Richmond	Register	31°24′46″S 23°56′56″E	Upload Photo
9/2/078/0012-030	141 Pienaar Street, Richmond	3-bay, hipped roof. Hipped ogee verandah roof on rustic pillars, with inset balusters. Left 3 veran Type of site: House Current use: Residential. . Early 20 C? Enhances the architectural environment.	Richmond	Richmond	Register	31°24′50″S 23°56′35″E	Upload Photo
9/2/078/0012-031	127 Pienaar Street, Richmond	3 bay set back from street. Hipped tiled roof. Cape Dutch Revival gable with narrow vent. Verandah Type of site: House Current use: Residential. . It enhances the architectural environment	Richmond	Richmond	Register	31°24′50″S 23°56′37″E	Upload Photo
9/2/078/0012-032	113 Pienaar Street, Richmond	Hipped corrugated iron roof, straight hipped verandah roof on fluted pillars. Verandah ends built in Type of site: House Current use: Residential. . This house has not been spoilt with modern metal windows.	Richmond	Richmond	Register	31°24′50″S 23°56′34″E	Upload Photo
9/2/078/0012-033	11 Spring Street, Richmond	Long symmetrical 3 bay on street, Corrugated iron saddle roof, ogee gutters, covered end-gables, lof Type of site: House Current use: Residential. . Various extension as back. 19th century. Street front relatively unspoilt.	Richmond	Richmond	Register	31°24′46″S 23°56′56″E	Upload Photo
9/2/078/0012-034	12 Spring Street, Richmond	Symmetrical 3 bay, high walled. Hipped corrugated iron roof. Cancave hipped verandah roof on wooden Type of site: House Current use: Residential. . Late 19th or early 20th century. A fairly good example of its kind.	Richmond	Richmond	Register	31°24′46″S 23°56′56″E	Upload Photo
9/2/078/0012-035	33 Loop Street, Richmond	3 bay semi-detached. Low pitched corrugated iron saddle roof with finial. Hipped concave corrugated Type of site: House Current use: Residential. . Although altered, the house is in keeping with the architectural environment.	Richmond	Richmond	Register	31°24′48″S 23°56′28″E	Upload Photo
9/2/078/0012-036	29 Loop Street, Richmond	Corruagted iron hipped roof. Wrap around verandah on both street fronts with ogee roof. Raised steop Type of site: House Current use: Residential. . 1920's appearance. A fine house enhancing the streetscape and of architectural value.	Richmond	Richmond	Register	31°24′48″S 23°56′27″E	Upload Photo
9/2/078/0012-037	115 Pienaar Street, Richmond	4 bay on street. Hipped roof. Long bullnose verandah roof on rounded pillars. Half glazed double doo Type of site: House Current use: Residential. . Spoilt by the addition of steel windows.	Richmond	Richmond	Register	31°24′49″S 23°56′28″E	Upload Photo
9/2/078/0012-038	118 Pienaar Street, Richmond	3-Bay, hipped roof, ogee gutters. Ogee hipped verandah roof on twin wooden posts, wooden brackets, w Type of site: House Current use: Residential. . 19th or early 20th century. House is typical of its kind and enhances the architectural environment.	Richmond	Richmond	Register	31°24′50″S 23°56′34″E	Upload Photo
9/2/078/0012-039	23 Loop Street, Richmond	Karoo type on street. Low parapet with cornice. Bullnose corruaged iron verandah roof on precast rou Type of site: House Current use: Residential. . Contributes favourably to the architectural environment.	Richmond	Richmond	Register	31°24′48″S 23°56′27″E	Upload Photo
9/2/078/0012-040	116 Pienaar Street, Richmond	3-bay, Hipped roof with loft door gablet, ogee gutters, cast-iron rainwater heads. Ogee verandah roo Type of site: House Current use: Residential. . Late 19th or early 20th century. Despite alterations, of some value to the architectural environment.	Richmond	Richmond	Register	31°24′50″S 23°56′35″E	Upload Photo
9/2/078/0012-041	Erf 220, 37 Loop Street, Richmond	2 Bay cottage on street. Karoo type with low rounded pediment and fine plaster mouldings. Small low Type of site: House Current use: Residential. . Modernized to its detriment. Spoilt but of environmental value in the streetscape.	Richmond	Richmond	Register	31°24′48″S 23°56′51″E	Upload Photo
9/2/078/0012-042	Richmond Museum, 17 Loop Street, Richmond	Double winged large corner building. Low pitched corrugated iron hipped roof. Small verandah between Type of site: House Current use: Museum. . An interesting handsome building	Richmond	Richmond	Register	31°24′48″S 23°56′53″E	Upload Photo
9/2/078/0012-043	13 Spring Street, Richmond	Karoo type symmetrical 3 bay. Heavy plain cornice. Rough plaster walls. High stone stoep, modern tub Type of site: House Current use: Residential. 19th century, Relatively unspoilt facade.	Richmond	Richmond	Register	31°24′46″S 23°56′55″E	Upload Photo
9/2/078/0012-044	24 Loop Street, Richmond	3 bay corner house. Long corrugated iron hipped roof. Concave wrap around verandah roof on wooden po Type of site: House Current use: Residential. . Altered, particularly interior. Was possibly flat roofed. Still some fine interior features.	Richmond	Richmond	Register	31°24′48″S 23°56′50″E	Upload Photo
9/2/078/0012-045	42 Loop Street, Richmond	Long 3 bay on street. Corrugated iron hipped roof. Ogee verandah on precast rounded pillars and wall Type of site: House Current use: Residential. . Good typical example of local architecture	Richmond	Richmond	Register	31°24′49″S 23°56′49″E	Upload Photo
9/2/078/0012-046	168 Pienaar Street, Richmond	Large 4 bay on street. Large hipped roof with wrap around ogee verandah on precast rounded pillars, Type of site: House Current use: Residential. . Pity about the modern windows enclosing part of the verandah. Handsome house typical of its kind in	Richmond	Richmond	Register	31°24′53″S 23°56′59″E	Upload Photo
9/2/078/0012-047	54 Loop Street, Richmond	High hipped corrugated iron roof. Hipped ogee verandah roof on fluted pillars. Left side glazed in w Type of site: House Current use: Residential. . In keeping with street's architecture	Richmond	Richmond	Register	31°24′48″S 23°56′43″E	Upload Photo
9/2/078/0012-048	219 Paul Street, Richmond	3-bay, hipped roof, chimney with pot. Bullnose verandah on wooden posts, plastered walls. Modern 2x Type of site: Residential/Municipal Current use: Residential/Municipal Clinic. 19th century. Contributes to the architectural environment	Richmond	Richmond	Register	31°24′50″S 23°57′02″E	Upload Photo
9/2/078/0012-049	28 Loop Street, Richmond	3 bay on street. Low hipped roof. Plastered imitation ashlared walls, fine moulded cornmice. Modern Type of site: House Current use: Commercial. . Might have been flat roofed originally. Part of a group and contributes to the architectural environment.	Richmond	Richmond	Register	31°24′49″S 23°56′54″E	Upload Photo
9/2/078/0012-050	145 Pienaar Street, Richmond	3-bay, hipped roof, ogee gutters, rainwater heads. Bullnose verandah on squared pillars, dipped rust Type of site: House Current use: Residential. . Late 19th or early 20th century. Typical of local architecture	Richmond	Richmond	Register	31°24′51″S 23°56′54″E	Upload Photo
9/2/078/0012-051	217 Paul Street, Richmond	3-bay, hipped roof, chimney with pot. Bullnose verandah roof on wooden posts. Plastered walls. 6x6 p Type of site: Residential/Municipal Current use: Residential/Municipal Clinic. 19th century	Richmond	Richmond	Register	31°24′52″S 23°57′01″E	Upload Photo
9/2/078/0012-052	270 Hope Street, Richmond	Karoo type 3 bay. Edge moulded parapet, stepped at side of house. Low stone stoep. 3x3 panelled doub Type of site: House Current use: Residential. . Another of the few remaining relatively unspoilt houses of its kind in the town.	Richmond	Richmond	Register	31°24′46″S 23°56′43″E	Upload Photo
9/2/078/0012-053	67 Loop Street, Richmond	3-bay. Hipped roof, ogee gutters. Stoep, rough brick, short brick posts and iron fence. Half glazed Type of site: House Current use: Residential. 1920s appearance, possibly older.	Richmond	Richmond	Register	31°24′48″S 23°56′27″E	Upload Photo
9/2/078/0012-054	38 Loop Street, Richmond	4 bay on street. Corrugated iron hipped roof. Corrugated iron ogee verandah roof on precast rounded Type of site: House Current use: Residential. . The house is typical of much of the town's architecturwe and contributes to te environment	Richmond	Richmond	Register	31°24′49″S 23°56′51″E	Upload Photo
9/2/078/0012-055	40 Loop Street, Richmond	Large dwelling on street. High hipped corrugated iron roof, two high chimneys. Hipped ogee verandah Type of site: House Current use: Residential. . A very fine well-kept house.	Richmond	Richmond	Register	31°24′48″S 23°56′28″E	Upload Photo
9/2/078/0012-056	Pienaar Street, Richmond	Long 3 bay. Plastered imitation ashlared walls with few quoins remaining on upper corners. 2x2 panel Type of site: House Current use: Residential. . Despite the alterations, the house is still of value to the architectural environment.	Richmond	Richmond	Register	31°24′50″S 23°56′38″E	Upload Photo
9/2/078/0012-057	21 Loop Street, Richmond	Long 5 bay. Low hipped corruaged iron roof. Raised verandah with bullnose, corrugated iron roof. Ver Type of site: House Current use: Residential. . A good building enhancing the architectural environment	Richmond	Richmond	Register	31°24′48″S 23°56′37″E	Upload Photo
9/2/078/0012-058	146 Pienaar Street, Richmond	5 bay on street. Half hipped corrugated iron roof, ogee gutters. Straight corrugated iron verandah r Type of site: House Current use: Residential. . This neat house is part of a group starting from the corner shop and enhances the architectural envi	Richmond	Richmond	Register	31°24′51″S 23°56′51″E	Upload Photo
9/2/078/0012-059	Erf 622, 46 Loop Street, Richmond	Cottage, originally 3 bay now library. Hipped roof, low stone stoep. Entrance in an arched alcove wi Type of site: House Current use: Civic: Library. . Contributes to the architecture of the street	Richmond	Richmond	Register	31°24′49″S 23°56′53″E	Upload Photo
9/2/078/0012-060	35 Loop Street, Richmond	3 bay semi-detached on street. Low pitched corrugated iron saddle roof with finial. Hipped concave c Type of site: House Current use: Residential. . An attractive house enhancing the architectural environment.	Richmond	Richmond	Register	31°24′48″S 23°56′46″E	Upload Photo
9/2/078/0012-061	142 Pienaar Street, Richmond	Warehouse attached to shop. Hipped corrugated iron roof shared with shop. High plastered walls. Load Type of site: Warehouse Current use: Warehouse. . Possibly altered inside, was at one time also used as a cinema	Richmond	Richmond	Register	31°24′50″S 23°56′51″E	Upload Photo
9/2/078/0012-062	268 Hope Street, Richmond	3 bay on street. Hipped corrugated iron roof, chimney towards back. Low stone and concrete stoep. Na Type of site: House Current use: Residential. . The house contributes to the environment of this quiet street.	Richmond	Richmond	Register	31°24′46″S 23°56′20″E	Upload Photo
9/2/078/0012-063	66 Loop Street, Richmond	6 bay on street. Hipped corrugated iron roof. Bullnose wrap around verandah on pillars. High walls w Type of site: House Current use: Residential. . An attractive building enhancing the architectural environment	Richmond	Richmond	Register	31°24′48″S 23°56′44″E	Upload Photo
