= Desery Fienies =

South African politician

Desery Fienies MP

Permanent Delegate to the National Council of Provinces
- Incumbent
- Assumed office 15 June 2024

Northern Cape MEC for Sport, Arts and Culture
- In office 28 June 2020 – 28 May 2024
- Premier: Zamani Saul
- Preceded by: Berenice Sinexve
- Succeeded by: Office abolished

Member of the Northern Cape Provincial Legislature
- In office 12 June 2020 – 28 May 2024

Personal details
- Party: African National Congress
- Profession: Politician

Desery Wellin Fienies is a South African politician who has served as a Permanent Delegate to the National Council of Provinces from the Northern Cape since 2024. A member of the African National Congress, Fienies served as a member of the Northern Cape Executive Council and as a member of the Northern Cape Provincial Legislature from 2020 until 2024.

== Political career ==
On 12 June 2020, Finies was sworn in as a Member of the Northern Cape Provincial Legislature.

Premier Zamani Saul, in a cabinet reshuffle on 26 June, appointed her to lead the Department of Sport, Arts and Culture. Democratic Alliance provincial leader Andrew Louw said in a statement that she "lacked experience" as a newcomer while African National Congress provincial secretary Deshi Ngxanya welcomed her appointment. Fienies was formally sworn in on 28 June.

After the 2024 general election, Fienies was sworn in as a Permanent Delegate to the National Council of Provinces representing the Northern Cape.

Preceded by Berenice Sinexve	Northern Cape MEC for Sport, Arts and Culture; 2020–2024	Succeeded by Office abolished
