= Northern Cape Provincial Treasury =

Northern Cape Provincial Treasury department

Department overview
- Formed: 1994
- Jurisdiction: Government of the Northern Cape
- Headquarters: Metlife Towers, Kimberley, 8300
- Minister responsible: Abraham Vosloo, MEC for Finance, Economic Development and Tourism
- Department executive: Aelred Theophilus Mlungisi Mabija, Head of Department
- Website: www.ncpt.gov.za

The Provincial Treasury is one of the departments of the Government of the Northern Cape. The Provincial Treasury manages the provincial economic policy, prepares the provincial government's annual budget and manages the provincial government's finances.

The political head of the department is Abraham Vosloo, the MEC for Finance, Economic Development and Tourism. He manages the Provincial Treasury, as well as the Provincial Department of Economic Development and Tourism.
