= Dutch Reformed Church, Richmond =

Church in Richmond, South Africa

Dutch Reformed Church
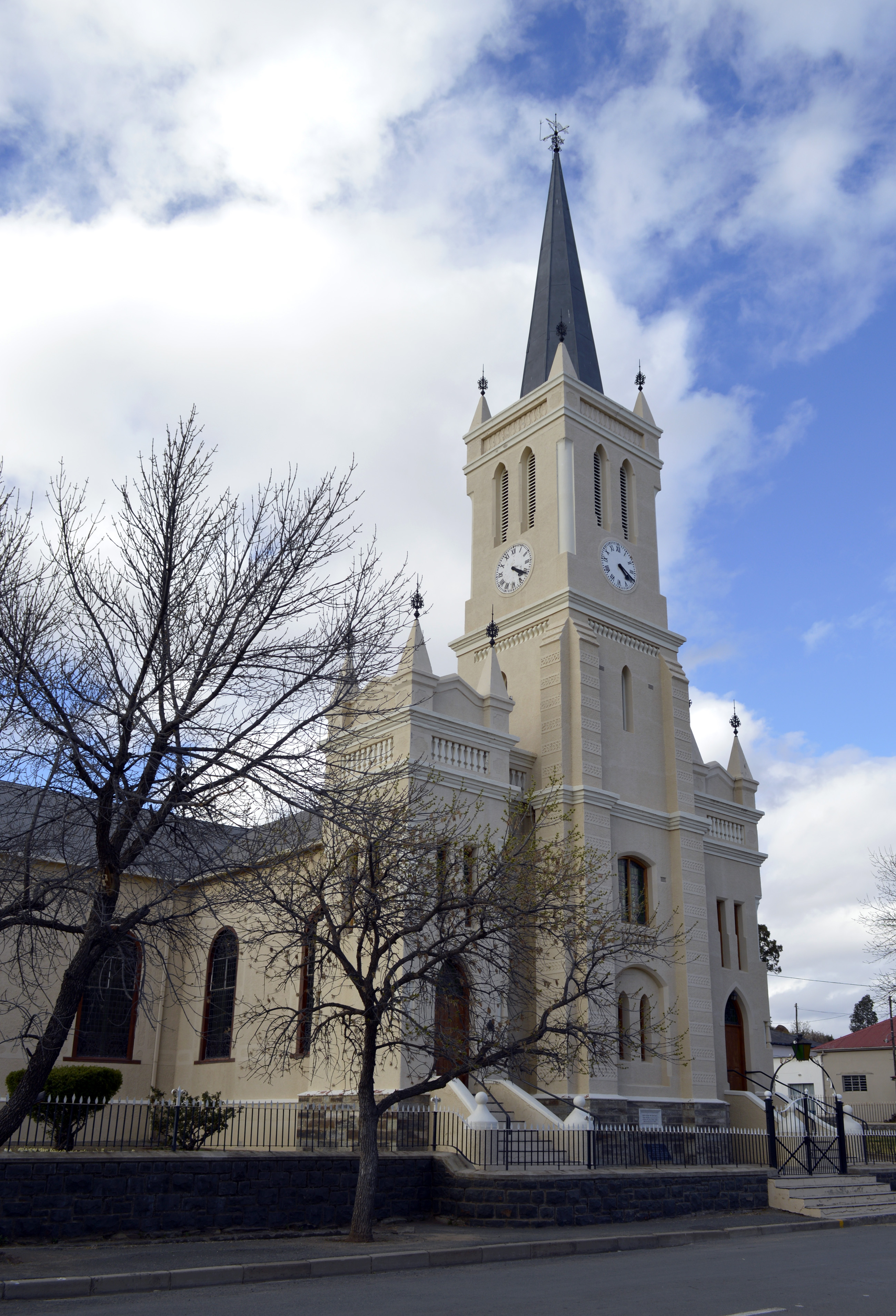
- Dutch Reformed Church
- 31°24′47″S 23°56′49″E
- Location: Richmond
- Country: South Africa
- Denomination: Nederduits Gereformeerde Kerk

History
- Founded: 1843

Architecture
- Functional status: Church

The Dutch Reformed Church in Richmond, Northern Cape, South Africa, is a congregation of the Dutch Reformed Church in the Synod of the Western and Southern Cape, although the Karoo town of Richmond has been located in the Northern Cape province since 1994. The congregation was founded in November 1843 as only the 30th in the entire church. Within the provincial boundaries of the Northern Cape, it is the second oldest congregation after the Dutch Reformed Church in Colesberg, which in turn falls under the Eastern Cape Synod.

== Background ==
Long distances led a number of members of the field cornetship Uitvlugt and Winterveld to purchase part of the farm Driefontein from one J. van der Merwe for a new church. The request to establish a new congregation there was granted by the Presbytery and the first church council was appointed, for which the governor, Sir Benjamin D'Urban, granted permission on 2 November 1843 and approved the appointment.

Rev. J.F. Berrangé, the congregation's first pastor, was welcomed and confirmed on 26 October 1844 and the cornerstone of the church building was laid on Monday 28 October 1844. The old dwelling house was improved to serve as a church and was later known as the old church. After much difficulty, the church of stone and brick was completed and solemnly consecrated on Sunday 28 February 1847. (This building was enlarged and improved over the years and remains in its changed form today as the congregation's place of worship.) Anton Anreith, who also did the woodwork of the Groote Kerk, was supposed to have completed the ornate pulpit before 15 December 1853, but the making of the pulpit took longer than the building of the church. The parsonage was completed in 1848 and served until 1949.

== Ministers ==
- Jan Frederik Berrangé, 1844–1860
- Dr. Johannes Jacobus Kotzé, 1862–1880
- Adriaan Moorrees, 1880–1892
- Dr. Johannes Petrus van Heerden, 1893–1899
- Johannes Francois Botha, 1899–1903
- Hendrik Johannes Louw du Toit, 1904–1930 (emeritus; died on 9 January 1947)
- Anthonie George Eliab van Velden, 1930–1936
- J.C. Cronjé, 1936–1941
- Petrus Jacobus Johannes Stefanus Els, 1941–1945
- Frederik Johannes Christoffel van Loggerenberg, 1946–?
- Willie Serfontein 1961–1966
- Theunis Louis Botha, 1966–1970
- Izak Bartholomeus Fourie, 1975 – 30 September 1984 (emeritus)
