= Martha Bartlett =

South African politician

Martha Bartlett MP

Permanent delegate to the National Council of Provinces from the Northern Cape
- Incumbent
- Assumed office 26 June 2020

Northern Cape MEC for Social Development
- In office 29 May 2019 – 11 June 2020
- Premier: Zamani Saul
- Preceded by: Gift van Staden
- Succeeded by: Nontobeko Vilakazi

Northern Cape MEC for Education
- In office 1 March 2016 – 29 May 2019
- Premier: Sylvia Lucas
- Preceded by: Grizelda Cjiekella
- Succeeded by: Mac Jack

Northern Cape MEC for Transport, Safety and Liaison
- In office 30 May 2014 – 1 March 2016
- Premier: Sylvia Lucas
- Preceded by: Mac Jack
- Succeeded by: Pauline Williams

Member of the Northern Cape Provincial Legislature
- In office 21 May 2014 – 11 June 2020

Personal details
- Born: Martha Bartlett
- Party: African National Congress
- Occupation: Member of Parliament
- Profession: Politician

Barbara Martha Bartlett is a South African politician. A member of the African National Congress, she has been serving as a permanent delegate to the National Council of Provinces since June 2020. From May 2014 to June 2020, Bartlett was a Member of the Northern Cape Provincial Legislature and a Member of the Executive Council in the provincial government.

== Provincial government ==
Bartlett was elected to the Northern Cape Provincial Legislature in 2014. She was sworn in as a member of the provincial legislature on 21 May 2014. On 30 May 2014, premier Sylvia Lucas appointed Bartlett as the Member of the Executive Council (MEC) for Transport, Safety and Liaison. She took office on the same day and succeeded Mac Jack.

On 1 March 2016, Lucas appointed Bartlett as the MEC for Education. She succeeded Grizelda Cjiekella, who died in October 2015. Pauline Williams took over as MEC for Transport, Safety and Liaison. Bartlett remained in the position until after the 2019 general election, when newly elected provincial premier Zamani Saul moved her to the Social Development portfolio. She succeeded Gift van Staden, while Mac Jack took over as Education MEC.

Bartlett resigned from the provincial government on 11 June 2020. Saul designated Nontobeko Vilakazi to take over as MEC for Social Development on 26 June.

== Parliamentary career ==
On 26 June 2020, Bartlett was sworn in as a permanent delegate to the National Council of Provinces. She received her committee assignments on the same day.

=== Committee assignments ===
- Joint Standing Committee on Defence
- Select Committee on Petitions and Executive Undertakings
- Select Committee on Security and Justice
- Select Committee on Cooperative Governance and Traditional Affairs

Political offices
| Preceded by Gift van Staden | Northern Cape MEC for Social Development; 2019–2020 | Succeeded by Nontobeko Vilakazi |
| Preceded by Grizelda Cjiekella | Northern Cape MEC for Education; 2016–2019 | Succeeded by Mac Jack |
| Preceded by Mac Jack | Northern Cape MEC for Transport, Safety and Liaison; 2014–2016 | Succeeded by Pauline Williams |
