= Gift van Staden =

South African politician

Gift van Staden MPL

Northern Cape MEC for Social Development
- In office 1 March 2016 – 22 May 2019
- Premier: Sylvia Lucas
- Preceded by: Mxolisa Sokatsha
- Succeeded by: Martha Bartlett

Member of the Northern Cape Provincial Legislature
- Incumbent
- Assumed office 27 October 2015

Personal details
- Born: Gift van Staden; 15 July 1962 (age 63)
- Party: African National Congress

Gift van Staden (born 15 July 1962) is a South African politician who serves as a Member of the Northern Cape Provincial Legislature for the African National Congress (ANC). He was the provincial MEC for Social Development from 2016 to 2019. Prior to serving in the legislature, he was the Executive Mayor of both the ZF Mgcawu District Municipality and the Khara Hais Local Municipality. He is a former business associate of John Block.

== Political career ==
Van Staden was the chair of a civic movement in the Prieska sub-region in the 1980s. In the 1990s, he was involved with the relaunch of two ANC branches. He served as the chair of the ANC's branch in Prieska for two terms.

Van Staden was a founding member of the South African Democratic Teachers Union (SADTU). He soon worked as a site steward at the Gariep High School in Prieska. He was elected to the Prieska transitional council and was appointed deputy mayor.

Before long, he moved to Upington and left formal politics for two years. Following his return, he was elected chairperson of the ANC's Rosedale branch.

In 2000, Van Staden was elected mayor of the Khara Hais Local Municipality. He was elected to ANC regional executive committee in 2001. He served as chairperson of the regional executive committee from 2006 until 2015.

Van Staden was elected mayor of the ZF Mgcawu District Municipality in 2011. He was sworn in as an MPL in October 2015.

In March 2016, premier Sylvia Lucas appointed Van Staden MEC for Social Development, succeeding Mxolisa Sokatsha.

Van Staden was not included in newly elected premier Zamani Saul's Executive Council. He was, however, appointed the legislature's chair of chairs and the Chairperson of the Portfolio Committee on Agriculture, Land Reform, Rural Development, Environment and Conservation.

== Controversies ==
=== Links to John Block ===
Van Staden is a former business partner of John Block. He was implicated in an investigation regarding his business links to Block involving the lease of municipal properties in Upington. Block's company had debts amounting to R160,000. These debts were written off by the Upington municipal council when Van Staden served as mayor. Van Staden and Block were also involved in a salt mine, SA Soutwerke.
