= Berenice Sinexve =

South African politician

Berenice Sinexve MPL

Northern Cape MEC for Sport, Arts and Culture
- In office 29 May 2019 – 11 June 2020
- Premier: Zamani Saul
- Preceded by: Bongiwe Mbinqo-Gigaba
- Succeeded by: Desery Finies

Member of the Northern Cape Provincial Legislature
- In office 22 May 2019 – 11 June 2020

Personal details
- Party: African National Congress
- Occupation: Politician

Berenice Sinexve is a South African politician and a party member of the African National Congress (ANC). She was a Member of the Northern Cape Provincial Legislature and the MEC (Member of the Executive Council) for Sport, Arts and Culture from May 2019 to June 2020.

Political offices
Preceded by Bongiwe Mbinqo-Gigaba	Northern Cape MEC for Sport, Arts and Culture; 2019–2020	Succeeded by Desery Finies
