= Northern Cape Department of Health =

Health Department of the Northern Cape

Department overview
- Formed: 1994
- Jurisdiction: Government of the Northern Cape
- Headquarters: 144 Du Toitspan Rd, Belgravia, Kimberley, 8301
- Minister responsible: Maruping Lekwene, Northern Cape MEC for Health
- Department executive: Steven Jonkers, Head of Department
- Website: www.northern-cape.gov.za/health/index.php

The Northern Cape Department of Health is the department of the Government of the Northern Cape, responsible for providing public healthcare to the population of the Northern Cape province of South Africa. The political head of the department is the MEC for Health; as of 2020 this is Maruping Lekwene.
