= 2008 Nic Diederichs Technical High School slashing =

Slashing incident in Krugersdorp, South Africa

- Krugersdorp (South Africa)
- Location: Krugersdorp, South Africa
- Date: 17 August 2008 c. 7:20 a.m. (SAST)
- Target: Pupils and employees at Nic Diederichs Technical High School
- Attack type: Mass slashing
- Weapon: 60-cm katana
- Deaths: 1
- Injuries: 3
- Perpetrator: Morné Harmse
- Motive: Desire for infamy; Belief in Satanism; Revenge for bullying

On 17 August 2008, 18-year-old student Morné Harmse attacked people at the Nic Diederichs Technical High School in Krugersdorp, South Africa, with a katana, resulting in the death of a 16-year-old student and injuries to two campus gardeners and another student. Harmse later pleaded guilty to a charge of murder and three charges of attempted murder, and was sentenced to twenty years' imprisonment.

Harmse was frequently bullied and was reported to have "followed" the practice of Satanism, and taking inspiration to the Columbine High School massacre. with the main target of achieving infamy, which accord his words he wanted "to make people take notice had been brewing for over a year". Harmse had acquired a mask that resembled one of a member of the American heavy metal band Slipknot, donned a dress similar to the band's singer, Corey Taylor on the morning of the attack, and had been listening to the band for months prior to the attack.

== Attack ==
At about 7:00 a.m. (SAST), Harmse arrived at school in a white t-shirt and jeans, wearing a brown mask and with black paint on his face. The mask was reported to be an imitation of the one Slipknot lead vocalist Corey Taylor wears, which Harmse had referred to as the "maggot mask" but the media claimed that it resembled Joey Jordison's own mask and not Taylor's. Two other masks were found in Harmse's bag: a clown mask from a Hollywood costume store similar to Shawn Crahan's and a handmade papier-mâché mask with drilled holes and painted with tribal marks similar to Chris Fehn. Three katanas were also found in his bag, including a Sekizo ninja sword and a small katana.

Victims
1. Jacques Pretorius, pupil, killed by slash to the neck
2. Stefan Bouwer, pupil, injured by slash to the head
3. Joseph Kodiseng, groundskeeper, critically injured
4. Simon Manamela, groundskeeper, critically injured

At about 7:20 a.m., during an assembly for a congregation, Harmse took out his 60-cm samurai sword and slashed 16-year-old pupil Jacques Pretorius' neck, killing him immediately. Harmse walked down a passage and slashed 17-year-old Stefan Bouwer on the head and was immediately confronted by two school groundskeepers, Joseph Kodiseng and Simon Manamela, who were both slashed and injured. All three were taken to hospital.

Harmse's attack was concluded when he sat down on a brick wall and stuck the sword in the ground, which was grabbed by his younger brother, Corné, who was standing nearby. At about 7:45 a.m., Harmse was escorted to the principal's office, and fifteen minutes later was arrested by police without incident. He was temporarily held in the custody of the Krugersdorp Police Station.

== Conviction ==
On 20 August 2008, Harmse was charged with one count of murder and three counts of attempted murder at the Krugersdorp Magistrate's Court. He was later sent to the Sterkfontein Psychiatric Hospital for mental health evaluation. On 25 October, after two consecutive months of mental health evaluation and two postponements of the court date, Harmse was ruled to be mentally fit by Magistrate Joachim Nortje.

The case was transferred to the South Gauteng High Court in Johannesburg for trial before Judge Gerhardus Hattingh. On 14 April 2009, Harmse pleaded guilty to all four charges, and on 10 October he was sentenced to twenty years' imprisonment.

On 3 March 2022, Harmse was given parole.

== Reactions ==
=== Blame Satanism and media ===
In the aftermath of the attacks, the blame was put on Satanism, which Harmse took an interest in. Harmse claimed that Satan had told him to do it and that he followed the practice of Satanism. When police executed a search in Harmse's room, they found "disturbing elements of Satanism" that included ouija boards and "spell books."

Heavy metal act Slipknot was also blamed for the attacks, as Harmse had obtained masks resembling those of the band members and was reportedly listening to the band months before.

He had claimed that upon listening to Slipknot, he had lost control of his body and had a mind of his own.

Slipknot frontman Corey Taylor later issued a response to Harmse's actions:

Obviously, I'm disturbed by the fact that people were hurt and someone died. As far as my responsibility for that goes, it stops there, because I know our message is actually very positive. I'm not encouraging anybody to kill anyone. I encourage our fans to express themselves, to stick together and to help each other.

=== Apology ===
The parents of Morné Harmse, Machiel and Liza Harmse, issued a formal apology to the Pretorius family.

== See also ==
- Columbine effect
- 2026 Ntabankulu Primary School shooting
- Satanic panic (South Africa)
