= Northern Cape Department of Social Development =

Government department in South Africa

Department overview
- Formed: 1994
- Jurisdiction: Government of the Northern Cape
- Headquarters: Mimosa Complex, Barkley Road, Kimberley
- Minister responsible: Nontobeko Vilakazi, MEC for Social Development
- Department executive: Hendrina Samson, Head of Department
- Website: socdev.ncpg.gov.za

The Northern Cape Department of Social Development is the department of the Government of the Northern Cape, responsible for providing social development, protection, and welfare services to the population of the Northern Cape province of South Africa. The political head of the department is the MEC for Social Development; as of 2020 this position is held by Nontobeko Vilakazi.
