= Alexandra Beukes =

South African politician

Member of the National Assembly of South Africa
- In office 12 June 2019 – 28 May 2024

Northern Cape MEC Transport, Safety and Liaison
- In office 11 May 2017 – 1 June 2017
- Premier: Sylvia Lucas
- Preceded by: Pauline Williams
- Succeeded by: Pauline Williams

Member of the Northern Cape Provincial Legislature
- In office 6 May 2009 – 7 May 2019

Personal details
- Party: African National Congress
- Occupation: Member of Parliament
- Profession: Politician

Alexandra Jennifer Beukes is a South African politician who served as a Member of Parliament in the National Assembly from June 2019 until May 2024. Prior to serving in the National Assembly, she was a Member of the Northern Cape Provincial Legislature and the mayor of the Khâi-Ma Local Municipality. Beukes is a member of the African National Congress.

== Political career ==
Beukes is a member of the African National Congress. Prior to her election to the Northern Cape Provincial Legislature, Beukes served as the mayor of the Khâi-Ma Local Municipality. She was elected to the provincial legislature in the April 2009 provincial election. Beukes was re-elected as an MPL in May 2014.

On 10 May 2017, premier Sylvia Lucas appointed Beukes as the Member of the Executive Council (MEC) for Transport, Safety and Liaison, succeeding Pauline Williams. She was sworn in as an MEC the next day. Due to disapproval from the ANC, Lucas rescinded her decision on 1 June 2017.

== Parliamentary career ==
Prior to the 2019 South African general election held on 8 May, Beukes was given the 118th position on the ANC's national list of candidates. She was not elected. However, Beukes entered parliament on 12 June 2019 as a replacement for Siyabonga Cwele. She was given her committee assignments later that month.

For the 2024 South African general election, Beukes was given the 185th position on the ANC's national list of candidates. She was not re-elected.

=== Committee assignments ===
- Joint Standing Committee on Defence
- Standing Committee on Public Accounts (Alternate member)
- Portfolio Committee on Defence and Military Veterans
