= Joy Maimela =

South African politician (born 1988)

The Honourable Joy Maimela MP

Chairperson of the Portfolio Committee on Basic Education
- Incumbent
- Assumed office 9 July 2024
- Minister: Siviwe Gwarube
- Preceded by: Bongiwe Mbinqo-Gigaba

Member of the National Assembly
- Incumbent
- Assumed office 14 June 2024

Personal details
- Born: Khomotjo Joy Maimela; 9 June 1988 (age 38) Skekhukhune, Transvaal; South Africa
- Party: African National Congress
- Education: Mopani South East College; University of South Africa

Khomotjo Joy Maimela (born 9 June 1988) is a South African politician who has represented the African National Congress (ANC) in the National Assembly of South Africa since June 2024. She is the chairperson of the assembly's Portfolio Committee on Basic Education.

Born in Sekukhune, Limpopo, Maimela spent her early career as a mineworker. She rose to political prominence as the interim coordinator of the ANC Youth League between April 2021 and March 2023. During that period, in December 2022, she was elected to a five-year term on the ANC National Executive Committee. Thereafter she joined the National Assembly in the May 2024 general election.

== Early life and career ==
Born on 9 June 1988, Maimela is from a village in Sekukhune in Limpopo Province (then the Northern Transvaal). Her home language was Sepedi. She matriculated in 2005 at the Graceland Education Centre. After high school she pursued vocational postgraduate education, completing a certificate in civil engineering at the Mopani South East College, a TVET college in Mopani, Limpopo, in 2010.

Between 2011 and 2017, Maimela worked as a chairlift operator at Glencore's Mototolo Mine, a platinum mine in Burgersfort, Limpopo. She also resumed her education part-time, and in 2017 she graduated from the University of South Africa with a Bachelor of Arts in governance, administration and development. Also in 2017 she was appointed as a non-executive director of the National Youth Development Agency. Thereafter, in the first half of 2018, she worked for the State Security Agency as an analyst for the South African Early Warning Centre.

Meanwhile, Maimela had become politically active at the age of 17, shortly after the end of apartheid, and had gone on to participate in the South African Students Congress, the Progressive Youth Alliance, and the Young Communist League. She also joined the African National Congress (ANC) and the ANC Youth League, and in September 2015 she was elected to the league's National Executive Committee.

== ANC Youth League coordinator: 2021–2023 ==
On 8 April 2021, Maimela was appointed as national coordinator of the National Youth Task Team (NYTT), a 35-member interim leadership corps which was mandated to lead the ANC Youth League until the league could hold new leadership elections. She worked alongside Nonceba Mhlauli, who was appointed as convenor of the NYTT.

Maimela and Mhlauli's NYTT replaced a former task team, led by Tandi Mahambehlala as convenor and Sibongile Besani as coordinator, which had been appointed after Collen Maine's leadership corps was disbanded in 2019; Mahambehlala and Besani had been trying unsuccessfully since then to hold an elective conference. In the weeks after her appointment, Maimela appeared to blame former league president Julius Malema for the disarray, saying that the league had "been plagued with financial challenges" since the tenure of Malema's leadership corps, which she said had been responsible for "gross financial mismanagement and grand scale looting" of the league.

While serving in that role, she attended the mainstream ANC's 55th National Conference, held at Nasrec in December 2022. The conference elected her to a five-year term as a member of the National Executive Committee. By number of votes received, she was ranked 68th of the 80 ordinary members elected, receiving 1,058 votes across 4,029 ballots. With Mhlauli and Zuko Godlimpi, she was one of three people under the age of 35 to gain election, and the Daily Maverick said that she was in pole position for elevation to government office.

Meanwhile, Maimela's tenure as NYTT coordinator was controversial, and the NYTT failed to arrange an elective conference for the Youth League. In March 2023, the ANC National Working Committee announced that Maimela and Mhlauli's NYTT would be disbanded and replaced by a new task team. Maimela was replaced as coordinator by Sonto Motaung.

== National Assembly: 2024–present ==
Ahead of the May 2024 general election, Mhlauli stood as an ANC candidate, ranked 33rd on the party's national list. She was elected to a seat in the National Assembly, and on 9 July 2024 she was elected as chairperson of the Portfolio Committee on Basic Education.
