= Neo Maneng =

South African politician

Neo Samuel Maneng MPL

Member of the Northern Cape Provincial Legislature
- In office 22 May 2019 – 29 may 2024

Personal details
- Born: Neo; 5 October 1980 (age 45) Kganwane Northern Cape
- Party: African National Congress
- Children: 03

Neo Samuel Maneng is a South African politician from the Northern Cape. He is the former chief whip of the African National Congress (ANC) caucus in the Northern Cape Provincial Legislature. He was elected to the legislature in May 2019. He is also the former provincial secretary of the African National Congress Youth League (ANCYL). Maneng is seen as someone who is aligned to former premier Sylvia Lucas.
