= Northern Cape Department of Sport, Arts and Culture =

Government department in South Africa

Department overview
- Jurisdiction: Government of the Northern Cape
- Headquarters: 22 Abattoir Road, Ashburnham, Kimberley
- Minister responsible: Desery Finies, Northern Cape MEC for Sport, Arts and Culture
- Department executive: Ruth Palm, Head of Department
- Website: dsac.ncpg.gov.za

The Northern Cape Department of Sport, Arts and Culture is the department of the Government of the Northern Cape, responsible for promoting, supporting, developing and protecting the arts, culture and sports of the Northern Cape. The political head of the department is the MEC (Member of the Executive Council); as of 2020 this position is held by Desery Finies.
