= Danie Coetzee (politician) =

South African politician

Danie Coetzee MPL

Member of the Northern Cape Provincial Legislature
- Incumbent
- Assumed office 22 May 2019

Personal details
- Party: Freedom Front Plus
- Occupation: Politician

Daniel Johannes Coetzee is a South African politician who has been serving as a Member of the Northern Cape Provincial Legislature since 22 May 2019. He is the sole representative of the Freedom Front Plus (FF+) in the provincial legislature.
