= Allen Grootboom =

South African politician and psychologist

Member of the National Assembly of South Africa
- In office 6 May 2009 – 7 May 2019

Member of the Northern Cape Provincial Legislature
- In office 22 May 2019 – 11 September 2019

Personal details
- Born: Gregory Allen Grootboom; 8 July 1954 (age 72)
- Party: Democratic Alliance (2000–2019)
- Other political affiliations: Democratic Party (1995–2000); African National Congress (Until 1995)
- Education: University of Port Elizabeth (MEd); University of the Free State (PhD); University of the Western Cape
- Profession: Psychologist; Politician

Gregory Allen Grootboom (born 8 July 1954) is a retired South African politician and psychologist.

== Biography ==
Grootboom was born in 1954. He started his student activism at the University of the Western Cape in 1973. He soon became involved with the Black Consciousness movement and joined the South African Students' Organisation (SASO). He was also involved with the New Unity Movement and played a leading role in student politics.

Grootboom was a member of the African National Congress (ANC) until 1995 when he became a member of the Democratic Party (DP). The DP became the Democratic Alliance (DA) in 2000.

Grootboom briefly left politics to finish his studies and achieved an MEd in Psychology from the University of Port Elizabeth. He was also a Ford Fellow at the Ford Foundation. He later obtained a PhD in psychology from the University of the Free State.

Grootboom returned to politics in 2009, as he became the leader and chairperson of the DA in the Northern Cape. He was sworn in as an MP in May 2009. He served as the DA's Shadow Deputy Minister for Arts and Culture.

Grootboom was elected to the Northern Cape Provincial Legislature in May 2019, but announced his withdrawal from politics a few months later in August. He resigned as an MPL in September and the DA appointed Sol Plaatje councillor Ofentse Mokae to succeed him.
