= Ofentse Mokae =

South African politician

Ofentse Mokae MP

Permanent Delegate to the National Council of Provinces from the Northern Cape
- Incumbent
- Assumed office 15 June 2024

Member of the Northern Cape Provincial Legislature
- In office 11 September 2019 – 28 May 2024
- Preceded by: Allen Grootboom

Councillor of the Sol Plaatje Local Municipality
- In office 2016–2019

Personal details
- Born: Ofentse Jeremiah Mokae Galeshewe, Kimberley, South Africa
- Party: Democratic Alliance
- Profession: Politician

Ofentse Jeremiah Mokae is a South African politician who has been a Permanent Delegate to the National Council of Provinces for the Northern Cape since 2024. A member of the Democratic Alliance, Mokae was a councillor of the Sol Plaatje Local Municipality from 2016 to 2019 and then served as a member of the Northern Cape Provincial Legislature until 2024.

== Early life and education ==
Mokae was born in Galeshewe, Kimberley. He matriculated from Thabane High School and went to study at the Cape Peninsula University of Technology. He holds a national diploma in journalism and a B-tech degree. Mokae is currently studying towards a diploma in local government from the University of Fort Hare.

== Political career ==
Mokae joined the Congress of South African Students and was elected as the local secretary for the organisation's student body in the Sol Plaatje sub-region in 2006. While at university, he was active in both the South African Student Congress and the Students' Christian Organisation. In 2011, he joined the Democratic Alliance.

Mokae returned to Kimberley in 2013. He was appointed as a field worker for the DA. The DA also appointed him as a provincial youth coordinator and as a researcher at the provincial legislature. In 2014, Mokae participated in US President Barack Obama's Young African Leaders Initiative. In 2016, he was elected as a proportional representation councillor of the Sol Plaatje Local Municipality. At the age of 29, he was the youngest member of the DA's caucus.

In September 2019, the DA selected him to fill Allen Grootboom's seat in the Northern Cape Provincial Legislature. He was sworn in on 11 September 2019.

Following the 2024 general election, Mokae was sworn in as a Member of the National Council of Provinces.

== Personal life ==
Mokae is an LGBT-activist.
