= Northern Cape Department of Agriculture, Land Reform and Rural Development =

Department of Agriculture, Land Reform and Rural Development of the Northern Cape

Department overview
- Jurisdiction: Government of the Northern Cape
- Headquarters: 162 George Street, Kimberlite Building, Kimberley, 8301
- Minister responsible: Mase Manopole, MEC for Land Reform, Agriculture and Nature Conservation and Environmental Affairs
- Department executive: WVD Mothibi, Head of Department
- Website: www.agrinc.gov.za

The Northern Cape Department of Agriculture, Land Reform and Rural Development is the department of the Government of the Northern Cape, responsible for overseeing and supporting the Northern Cape's agricultural sector. The political head of this department is MEC Mase Manopole.
