= Hope Malgas =

South African politician

Hope Helene Malgas

National Assembly of South Africa

Personal details
- Party: Africa National Congress (ANC)
- Occupation: Politician

Hope Helene Malgas is a South African politician who is a former member of National Assembly and member of African National Congress (ANC) political party.

== Career ==
Malgas was a teacher before becoming a member of parliament (National Assembly of South Africa), she served on Portfolio Committees on Women, Children, Youths and persons with disabilities. She was also a chairperson of the Portfolio Committees on Basic Education and Social Development. Malgas was a member of Parliament from May 2014 to May 2019 through African National Congress (ANC).

She is mostly recognized for her role in overseeing Education policies, including supporting initiatives to make African languages compulsory in schools. She focused on improving education quality, monitoring teachers development and ensuring credible matriculation examinations.

She frequently engaged with provincial education departments to address issues directly impacting youths and learners in general, such as food poverty and infrastructure deficits.
