= Northern Cape Department of Co-operative Governance, Human Settlements and Traditional Affairs =

South African government department

Department overview
- Jurisdiction: Government of the Northern Cape
- Headquarters: JS du Plooy Building, 9 Cecil Sussman Street, Kimberley, 8301
- Minister responsible: Bentley Vass, Northern Cape MEC for Co-operative Governance, Human Settlements and Traditional Affairs
- Department executive: Bafedile Lenkoe, Head of Department
- Website: www.coghsta.ncpg.gov.za

The Northern Cape Department of Co-operative Governance, Human Settlements and Traditional Affairs is one of the departments of the Government of the Northern Cape. It is responsible for the oversight of municipalities and housing developments within the Northern Cape province of South Africa. The political head of the department is the MEC (Member of the Executive Council); as of 2018, this is Bentley Vass.
