= Lorraine Senye =

South African politician

Lorraine Senye MPL

Member of the Northern Cape Provincial Legislature
- Incumbent
- Assumed office 22 May 2019

Personal details
- Born: Lorraine Senye
- Party: African National Congress

Lorraine Senye is a South African politician from the Northern Cape. She is a Member of the Northern Cape Provincial Legislature. She was previously Mayor of the Siyancuma Local Municipality. Senye is a member of the African National Congress (ANC).
