= Portfolio Committee on Basic Education =

Portfolio Committee in the National Assembly of South Africa

- Formation: 2009; 17 years ago
- Purpose: Oversight of the Department of Basic Education
- Chairperson: Joy Maimela (ANC)
- Parent organisation: National Assembly of South Africa

The Portfolio Committee on Basic Education is a portfolio committee of the National Assembly of South Africa. It oversees the Department of Basic Education and related agencies, including Umalusi and the South African Council of Educators.

The committee was established in 2009 when the Ministry of Basic Education was established. Before then, its predecessor, the Portfolio Committee on Education, oversaw the Minister of Education, who was responsible for higher education as well as basic education.

== List of chairpersons ==
=== 2009–present: Basic Education ===
Session	Chairperson	Party	Election date	Citation
7th Parliament	Joy Maimela	ANC	9 July 2024	
6th Parliament	Bongiwe Mbinqo-Gigaba	ANC	2 July 2019	
5th Parliament	Nomalungelo Gina	ANC	24 June 2014	
4th Parliament	Hope Malgas	ANC	18 January 2011	
4th Parliament	Fatima Chohan	ANC	27 May 2009	

=== 1994–2009: Education ===
Session	Chairperson	Party	Election date	Citation
3rd Parliament	Shepherd Mayatula	ANC	25 June 2004	
2nd Parliament	Shepherd Mayatula	ANC	20 August 1999	
