= Grantham Steenkamp =

South African politician

Member of the Northern Cape Provincial Legislature
- In office 2 December 2019 – 1 December 2023
- Preceded by: Boitumelo Babuseng
- Succeeded by: Kgomotso Mohapanele

Personal details
- Party: Democratic Alliance (Until 2023; expelled)

Grantham Eugene Steenkamp is a South African politician who served as a member of the Northern Cape Provincial Legislature from 2019 until 2023, representing the Democratic Alliance.

In August 2022, Steenkamp was suspended from the DA alongside former party provincial leader Andrew Louw and his wife, Mariam, pending an investigation into allegations that they sought to recruit party members to join rival political parties in the province.

Steenkamp unsuccessfully stood for DA provincial leader against incumbent Harold McGluwa at the party's provincial conference in June 2023.

On 1 December 2023, Steenkamp was expelled from the DA for being divisive. He lost his membership of the provincial legislature as a result. He attempted to challenge his expulsion, but the Northern Cape High Court dismissed his application in early-February 2024, which saw the DA select Sol Plaatje councillor Kgomotso Mohapanele to fill his seat in the legislature.
