= Glenda Lepolesa =

South African politician

Glenda Lepolesa MPL

Member of the Northern Cape Provincial Legislature
- Incumbent
- Assumed office 22 May 2019

Personal details
- Born: Kesholohetse Glenda Lepolesa
- Party: Economic Freedom Fighters
- Occupation: Member of the Provincial Legislature
- Profession: Politician

Kesholohetse Glenda Lepolesa is a South African politician. A member of the Economic Freedom Fighters (EFF), she is a representative of the party in the Northern Cape Provincial Legislature. She is the deputy provincial secretary of the EFF.
