= Sanna Tities =

South African politician

Sanna Tities MPL

Member of the Northern Cape Provincial Legislature
- Incumbent
- Assumed office 22 May 2019

Personal details
- Born: Sanna Tities
- Party: African National Congress

Sanna Tities is a South African politician who has been serving as a Member of the Northern Cape Provincial Legislature since 22 May 2019. A member of the African National Congress (ANC), she is the Chairperson of both the Portfolio Committee on Health and Social Development and the Standing Committee on Gender, Women, Children and Persons with Disabilities.
