= Shadrack Tlhaole =

South African politician

Shadrack Tlhaole MPL

Member of the National Assembly of South Africa
- In office 1 February 2017 – 31 October 2017

Member of the Northern Cape Provincial Legislature
- Incumbent
- Assumed office 14 November 2017

Personal details
- Born: Shadrack Lapologang Tlhaole
- Party: Economic Freedom Fighters
- Occupation: Member of the Provincial Legislature
- Profession: Politician

Shadrack Lapologang Tlhaole is a South African politician and a party member of the Economic Freedom Fighters (EFF).

He is the provincial chairperson of the EFF and currently a Member of the Northern Cape Provincial Legislature for the party, after having taken office in November 2017. He formerly served as the provincial secretary of the party. Tlhaole was previously the provincial chair of the African National Congress Youth League (ANCYL). He left the ANC in 2016 and subsequently became a member of the EFF. Tlhaole became an MP for the EFF in February 2017 and served as one until his deployment to the legislature in October 2017. In November 2010, Tlhaole was named the Sunday Times' "Mampara of the week".

In October 2022, Tlhaole was elected provincial chairperson of the EFF. He succeeded former chairperson Aubrey Baartman as the party's leader in the legislature following Baartman's resignation.
