= Aubrey Baartman =

South African politician from the Northern Cape

Member of the Northern Cape Provincial Legislature
- In office 21 May 2014 – 31 October 2022

Personal details
- Born: 4 October 1958 (age 67)
- Party: Economic Freedom Fighters
- Other political affiliations: African National Congress
- Occupation: Politician

Nevie Aubrey Baartman (born 4 October 1958) is a South African politician from the Northern Cape. He was the provincial leader of the Economic Freedom Fighters (EFF) and an EFF representative in the Northern Cape Provincial Legislature. He was previously a senior provincial African National Congress (ANC) member.

== Political career ==
Baartman was formerly a member of the ANC. He joined the party in the 1990s and served on multiple party structures. He served as mayor of the Namakwa District Municipality and as regional secretary of the party's Namakwa region. Baartman was a member of the National Executive Committee of the South African Football Association (SAFA).

Baartman joined the EFF in 2013 when the party was formed. He became the inaugural provincial leader of the party. Prior to his election to the Northern Cape Provincial Legislature, he served as the municipal manager of the Nama Khoi Local Municipality. He took office as a member of the provincial legislature in May 2014.

In 2019, Baartman was re-elected for a second term as a member of the provincial legislature. On 2 October 2022, provincial secretary Shadrack Tlhaole was elected to succeed Baartman as provincial chairperson of the EFF. Baartman resigned from the provincial legislature on 31 October 2022.

== Legal issues ==
In 2016, he was accused of committing fraud during his tenure as municipal manager. Baartman denied these claims. In 2024, Baartman was sentenced to three years of correctional supervision for failing to adhere to 'correct tender procedures' when awarding a tender during his time as municipal manager.
