= Zolile Monakali =

South African politician

Northern Cape MEC for Education
- In office 16 September 2020 – 27 June 2024
- Premier: Zamani Saul
- Preceded by: Mac Jack
- Succeeded by: Abraham Vosloo

Member of the Northern Cape Provincial Legislature
- In office 8 September 2020 – 28 May 2024

Personal details
- Born: Zolile Monakali Prieska, Cape Province, South Africa
- Party: African National Congress
- Education: Tshwane University of Technology; University of South Africa
- Occupation: Member of the Provincial Legislature
- Profession: Educator; Politician

Zolile Monakali is a South African educator and politician who served as the Northern Cape MEC for Education and a Member of the Northern Cape Provincial Legislature from 2020 until 2024. Prior to serving in the provincial government, he was the Executive Mayor of the Pixley ka Seme District Municipality. Monakali is a member of the African National Congress and the party's Pixley ka Seme regional chairperson.

== Early life and education ==
Monakali was born in Prieska. He obtained a BTech in education from the Tshwane University of Technology in 2005. From the University of South Africa, he received a post-graduate diploma in 2008. He is currently studying towards an MPA from the University of the Free State.

== Career ==
Monakali started his teaching career as a teacher at Ethembeni High School in 1994. In 1999, Monakali was appointed the deputy principal of Heuwelsig High School in his home. He taught at the school until 2004, when he was employed as a skills development facilitator at the Department of Education's regional office. Not long after, he was appointed the director of corporate services at the Siyathemba Local Municipality.

Monakali served as the municipal manager of the Thembelihle Local Municipality until 2010. He then worked as the district director for the Department of Co-operative Governance, Human Settlements and Traditional Affairs until 2019, when he was elected Executive Mayor of the Pixley ka Seme District Municipality. He held the post until early 2020.

== Politics ==
Monakali was the inaugural chairperson of the ANC branch in his home town. He was elected to the party's regional executive committee in 1997. Prior to his election as regional chairperson in 2013, he was an additional member, the deputy secretary and the deputy chairperson. He has also served as chairperson of the local SADTU branch. He is a member of both SAMWU and NEHAWU.

== Provincial government ==
On 8 September 2020, Monakali was sworn in as a Member of the Northern Cape Provincial Legislature. He filled the seat left vacant by the death of Mac Jack, the previous Member of the Executive Council for Education. Premier Zamani Saul announced on 15 September that Monakali would succeed Jack as the MEC for Education. He was sworn in on 16 September.

Monakali was not elected to return to the Northern Cape Provincial Legislature in the 2024 provincial election and consequently left the provincial Executive Council.
