= Andrew Louw (politician) =

South African politician (born 1969)

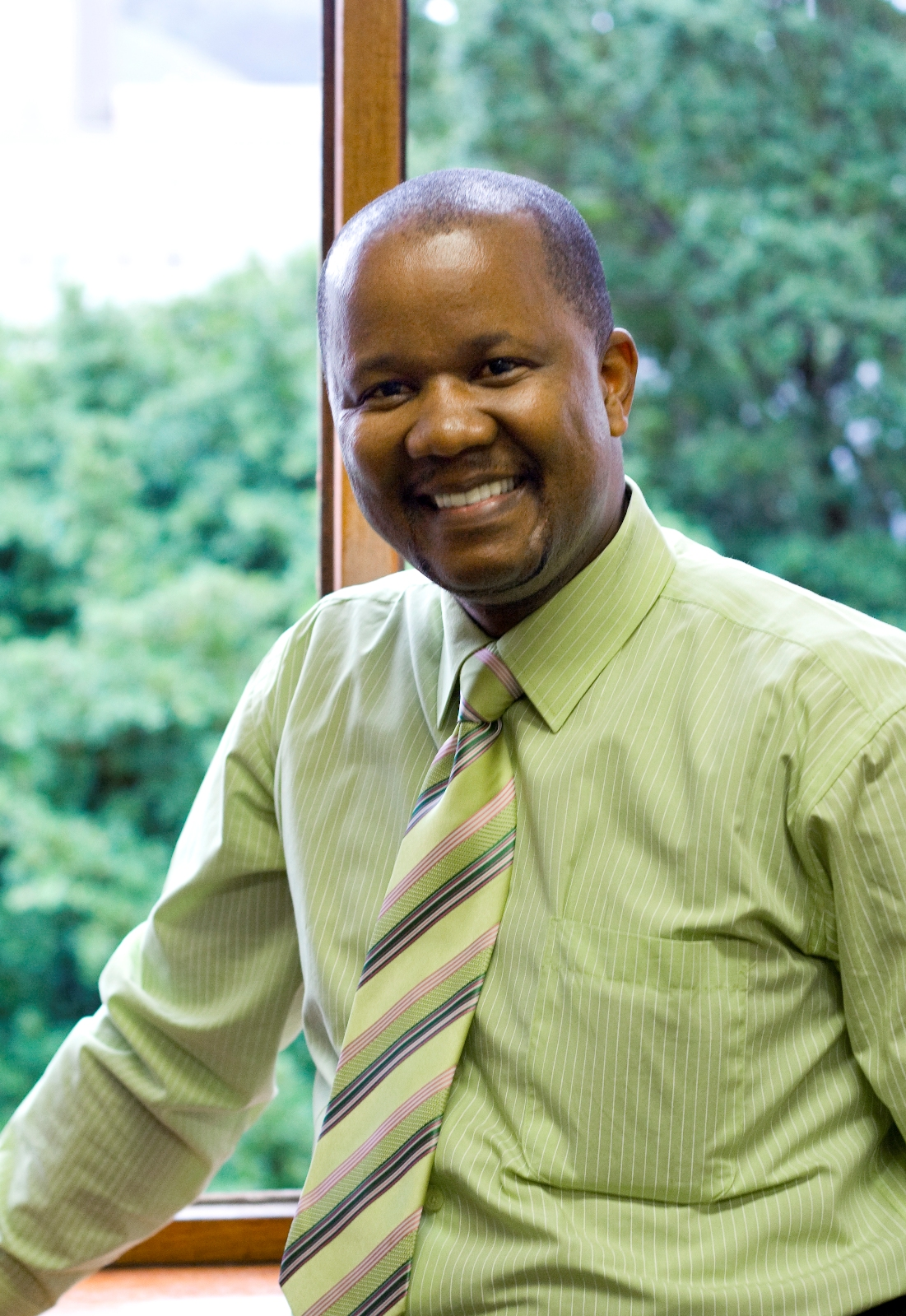

Leader of the Opposition in the Northern Cape Provincial Legislature
- In office 21 May 2014 – 30 November 2021
- Premier: Zamani Saul; Sylvia Lucas
- Preceded by: Fred Wyngaard
- Succeeded by: Harold McGluwa

Shadow Minister of Labour
- In office 14 May 2009 – 6 September 2010
- Shadowing: Membathisi Mdladlana
- Preceded by: Mark Lowe
- Succeeded by: Ian Ollis

Leader of the Democratic Alliance in the Northern Cape
- In office 24 August 2009 – 5 December 2020
- Preceded by: Chris Liebenberg
- Succeeded by: Harold McGluwa

Member of the National Assembly of South Africa
- In office 6 May 2009 – 10 September 2010
- Constituency: Northern Cape

Member of the Northern Cape Provincial Legislature
- In office 13 September 2010 – 31 March 2022
- Constituency: Sol Plaatje

Personal details
- Born: 28 August 1969 (age 56) Kimberley, Northern Cape, South Africa
- Party: African National Congress (2026–present); ActionSA (2022–2026); Democratic Alliance (Until 2022)
- Spouse: Mariam
- Children: 3

Andrew Louw (born 28 August 1969) is a South African politician who served as Leader of the Opposition in the Northern Cape Provincial Legislature from 2014 until 2021. He was the Provincial Leader of the Democratic Alliance in the Northern Cape from 2009 to 2020. He was previously a Member of the National Assembly of South Africa where he served as the Shadow Minister of Labour. Louw was the Democratic Alliance's Northern Cape Premier candidate for the 2014 and 2019 elections.

== Family and personal life ==
Andrew Louw was born in 1969 in Kimberley. He matriculated from Homevale Senior Secondary School. He went on to study at various universities and achieved a Marketing Management Diploma and a Business Management Diploma from the Rand Afrikaans University. He obtained an Operations Management Diploma from the University of Pretoria and a Diversity Management Diploma from the University of the Witwatersrand. Louw also achieved a Labour Relations qualification from the University of South Africa.

He is married to Mariam Louw, a PR councillor in the Sol Plaatje Local Municipality. They have three children together.

== Political career ==
Louw served as a Sol Plaatje Municipality councillor from 2006 until his election to the National Assembly in 2009. He took office as a Member of the National Assembly on 6 May 2009. On 14 May 2009, Democratic Alliance Parliamentary Leader Athol Trollip appointed Louw as the Shadow Minister of Labour.

On 24 August 2009, National Democratic Alliance Leader Helen Zille designated Louw to the post of Provincial Leader of the Northern Cape Democratic Alliance after incumbent Provincial Leader Chris Liebenberg had resigned.

In September 2010, the Democratic Alliance announced that Louw would be redeployed to the Northern Cape Provincial Legislature. Ian Ollis succeeded him as Shadow Minister of Labour. Louw resigned as a Member of the National Assembly on 10 September 2010. He took office as a Member of the Northern Cape Provincial Legislature on 13 September 2010.

In January 2014, the Democratic Alliance selected him to be the party's premier candidate for the 2014 general elections. He lost to incumbent Premier Sylvia Lucas of the African National Congress. However, the Democratic Alliance did become the largest opposition party in the province, and Louw consequently took up the post of Leader of the Opposition.

In September 2018, the National Leader of the Democratic Alliance Mmusi Maimane announced Louw as the party's premier candidate for the 2019 elections.

In May 2019, the Democratic Alliance failed to unseat the African National Congress in the Northern Cape. The DA did manage to retain its position as Official Opposition with an increase in the number of seats in the party's provincial legislature caucus. Louw remained Leader of the Opposition.

In October 2020, Louw announced his intention to retire as provincial leader of the party. Harold McGluwa was elected to succeed him.

McGluwa was elected to replace Louw as DA caucus leader in the provincial legislature on 30 November 2021. On 4 March 2022, Louw resigned from the provincial legislature to pursue business interests. He said that he would remain a DA member.

In August 2022, the DA suspended Louw, his wife and DA MPL Grantham Steenkamp's party memberships over allegations that they were recruiting DA members to join ActionSA. Louw denied recruiting members to join ActionSA. He subsequently resigned from the DA and joined ActionSA after claiming that "the DA is no longer a conducive home for black members."

On 26 September 2022, Louw was appointed the provincial chairperson of ActionSA by party leader Herman Mashaba.

Louw joined the African National Congress in February 2026.
