= Government of the Northern Cape =

Government of the Northern Cape Province

Government of the Northern Cape Noord-Kaapse Regering (Afrikaans)
- Part of: Republic of South Africa
- Constitution: Constitution of The Northern Cape

Legislative branch
- Name: Legislature
- Type: Unicameral
- Presiding officer: Newrene Klaaste, Speaker

Executive branch
- Head of state and government
- Title: Premier
- Currently: Zamani Saul
- Cabinet
- Headquarters: Kimberley

The Northern Cape province of South Africa is governed in a parliamentary system in which the people

elect the provincial legislature and the legislature, in turn, elects the Premier as head of the executive. The Premier leads an Executive Council consisting of members who oversee various executive departments. The structure of the provincial government is defined by chapter six of the Constitution of South Africa.

== Legislature ==
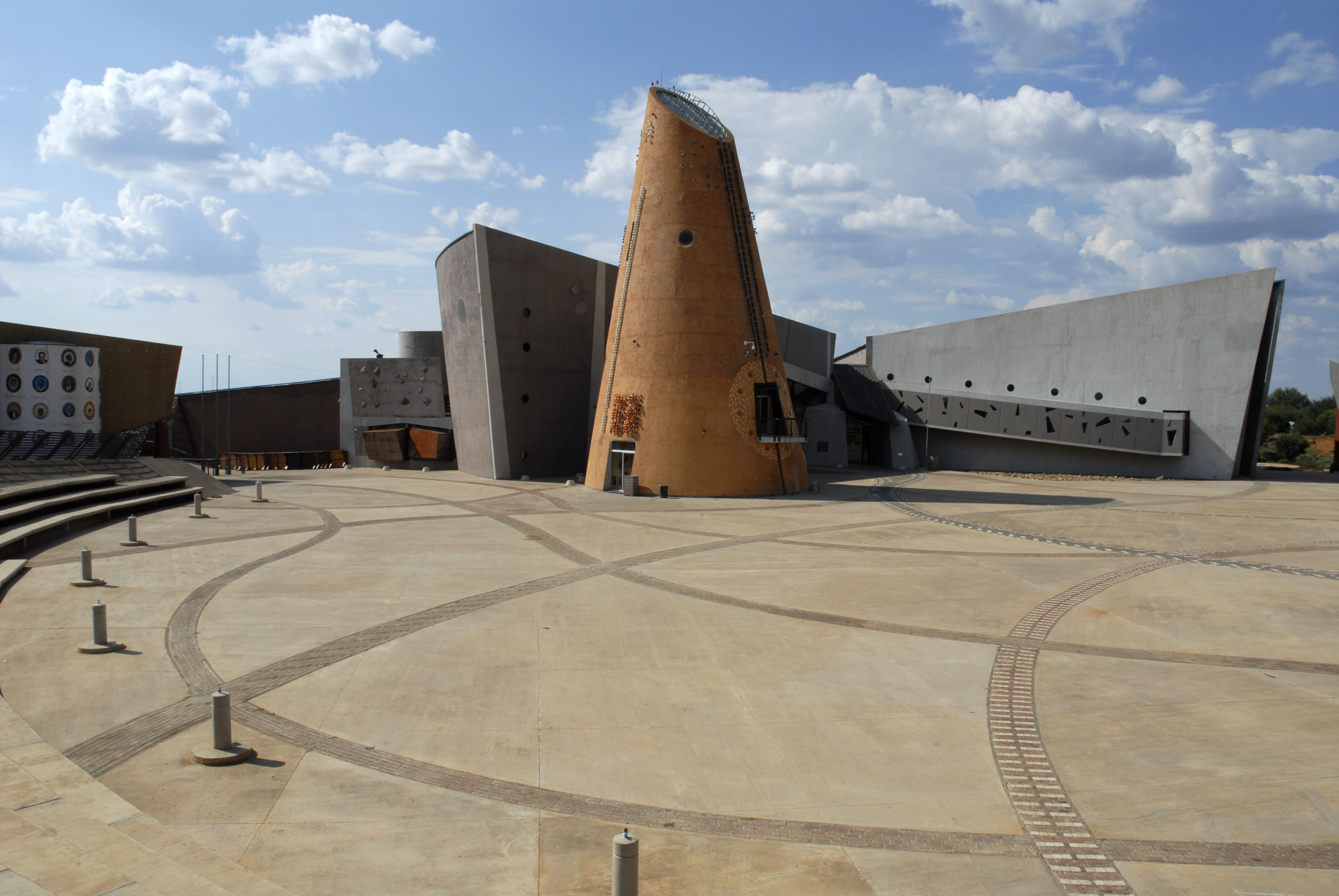
The provincial legislature is situated in the Galeshewe township of Kimberlely

The Northern Cape Provincial Legislature, situated in Kimberley, is the legislative branch of the provincial government. It is a unicameral legislature of 30 members, elected by a system of party-list proportional representation. An election is held every five years, conventionally at the same time as the election of the National Assembly.

After the election of 8 May 2019 there were eighteen members of the provincial legislature (MPLs) representing the African National Congress, eight representing the Democratic Alliance, three representing the Economic Freedom Fighters and one representing the Freedom Front Plus.

== Executive ==
The Premier of the Northern Cape is the head of the provincial government, chosen by the members of the provincial parliament from amongst themselves. The Premier appoints Members of the Executive Council (MECs) to oversee the various departments of the provincial government. The Director-General is the non-political head of the provincial administration, while each department is led by a Head of Department. The current Premier is Zamani Saul of the African National Congress. Besides the Premier, the Executive Council consists of ten MECs overseeing eleven departments.

Portfolio	MEC	Party
Premier	Zamani Saul	ANC
Sport, Arts and Culture	Desery Finies	ANC
Transport and Safety Liaison	Nomandla Bloem	ANC
Finance, Economic Development and Tourism	Abraham Vosloo	ANC
Health	Maruping Lekwene	ANC
Co-operative Governance, Human Settlements and Traditional Affairs	Bentley Vass	ANC
Education	Zolile Monakali	ANC
Land Reform, Agriculture and Nature Conservation and Environmental Affairs	Mase Manopole	ANC
Roads and Public Works	Fufe Makatong	ANC
Social Development	Nontobeko Vilakazi	ANC
Youth, Women, Disability, Communications and E-Government	Venus Blennies	ANC

=== Departments ===
- Department of Agriculture, Land Reform and Rural Development
- Department of Co-operative Governance, Human Settlements and Traditional Affairs
- Department of Economic Development and Tourism
- Department of Education
- Department of Environment and Nature Conservation
- Department of Health
- Provincial Treasury
- Department of Roads and Public Works
- Department of Social Development
- Department of Sport, Arts and Culture
- Department of Transport, Safety and Liaison

== Judiciary ==
South Africa has a single national judiciary; there is no separate system of provincial courts. The Northern Cape Division of the High Court of South Africa in Kimberley has jurisdiction over all cases arising in the province, but generally handles only the most serious or high-profile criminal trials, high-value civil trials, cases involving judicial review of legislation or executive actions, and appeals from the magistrates' courts. Judges of the High Court periodically go on circuit to hear cases in parts of the province distant from Kimberley. Appeals from the High Court are to the national Supreme Court of Appeal and ultimately (if a constitutional matter is involved) to the Constitutional Court.

The province is divided into 26 magisterial districts and 6 sub-districts, each of which is served by a district magistrate's court. There are a further 24 branch and periodical courts to serve geographically dispersed districts. These district courts have jurisdiction over all criminal cases except murder, rape and treason and can impose a fine of up to R100,000 or a prison sentence of up to three years; and they have jurisdiction over civil cases where the value of the claim is less than R100,000. The regional magistrate's court for the Northern Cape, which sits at multiple locations in the province, has jurisdiction over all criminal cases except treason and can impose a fine of up to R300,000 or a prison sentence of up to fifteen years (or life in some circumstances). The regional court also has jurisdiction over civil cases where the value of the claim is less than R300,000, and divorce and family law cases.

== Local government ==
The division of the Northern Cape into municipalities.

As of 2016, the Northern Cape is divided into five district municipalities which are subdivided into twenty-six local municipalities. The municipalities are listed below.

- Frances Baard District Municipality: Dikgatlong Local Municipality, Magareng Local Municipality, Phokwane Local Municipality, Sol Plaatje Local Municipality
- John Taolo Gaetsewe District Municipality: Ga-Segonyana Local Municipality, Gamagara Local Municipality, Joe Morolong Local Municipality
- Namakwa District Municipality: Hantam Local Municipality, Kamiesberg Local Municipality, Karoo Hoogland Local Municipality, Khai-Ma Local Municipality, Nama Khoi Local Municipality, Richtersveld Local Municipality
- Pixley ka Seme District Municipality: Emthanjeni Local Municipality, Kareeberg Local Municipality, Renosterberg Local Municipality, Siyancuma Local Municipality, Siyathemba Local Municipality, Thembelihle Local Municipality, Ubuntu Local Municipality, Umsobomvu Local Municipality
- ZF Mgcawu District Municipality: !Kheis Local Municipality, Dawid Kruiper Local Municipality, Kai !Garib Local Municipality, Kgatelopele Local Municipality, Tsantsabane Local Municipality

== See also ==
- Government of South Africa
- Politics of the Northern Cape
