= List of members of the 7th Northern Cape Provincial Legislature =

This is a list of members of the 7th Northern Cape Provincial Legislature, elected in the 2024 provincial election, and taking membership changes into account.

The newly elected members met for the first time on 14 June 2024, after the 2024 provincial election, to elect new office-bearers which saw Newrene Klaaste, Mangaliso Matika and Zamani Saul re-elected as speaker, deputy speaker and premier, respectively. Sharifa Ferris of the Patriotic Alliance was later elected deputy speaker following Matika's appointment to the Executive Council.

== Members ==
This is a list of members of the provincial legislature, as of 14 June 2024:

Name	Parliamentary group	Term start	Term end
Venus Blennies	African National Congress	14 June 2024	Currently serving
David Davids	Patriotic Alliance	14 June 2024	Currently serving
Tsoane De Huis	African National Congress	14 June 2024	Currently serving
Sharifa Ferris	Patriotic Alliance	14 June 2024	Currently serving
Isak Fritz	Democratic Alliance	14 June 2024	Currently serving
Priscilla Isaacs	Democratic Alliance	14 June 2024	Currently serving
Rashad Jaffer	Patriotic Alliance	14 June 2024	Currently serving
Karen Jooste	Democratic Alliance	14 June 2024	Currently serving
Theo Joubert	Freedom Front Plus	14 June 2024	Currently serving
Mirriam Kibi	African National Congress	14 June 2024	Currently serving
Newrene Klaaste	African National Congress	14 June 2024	Currently serving
Limakatso Koloi	African National Congress	14 June 2024	Currently serving
Moeketsi Konote	Economic Freedom Fighters	14 June 2024	Currently serving
Arthwell Kwinana	Economic Freedom Fighters	14 June 2024	Currently serving
Maruping Lekwene	African National Congress	14 June 2024	Currently serving
Sibongile Letebele	Economic Freedom Fighters	14 June 2024	Currently serving
Reinette Liebenberg	Democratic Alliance	14 June 2024	Currently serving
Fufe Makatong	African National Congress	14 June 2024	Currently serving
Mase Manopole	African National Congress	14 June 2024	Currently serving
Mangaliso Matika	African National Congress	14 June 2024	Currently serving
Harold McGluwa	Democratic Alliance	14 June 2024	Currently serving
Lebogang Motlhaping	African National Congress	14 June 2024	Currently serving
Gizella Opperman	Democratic Alliance	14 June 2024	Currently serving
Fawzia Rhoda	Democratic Alliance	14 June 2024	Currently serving
Zamani Saul	African National Congress	14 June 2024	Currently serving
Norman Shushu	African National Congress	14 June 2024	Currently serving
Shadrack Tlhaole	Economic Freedom Fighters	14 June 2024	Currently serving
Bentley Vass	African National Congress	14 June 2024	Currently serving
Nontobeko Vilakazi	African National Congress	14 June 2024	Currently serving
Abraham Vosloo	African National Congress	14 June 2024	Currently serving
