= List of members of the 5th Northern Cape Provincial Legislature =

This is a list of members of the fifth legislature of the Northern Cape. The term started on 21 May 2014 and ended on 7 May 2019.

Name	Parliamentary group	Term start	Term end
Aubrey Baartman	Economic Freedom Fighters	21 May 2014	7 May 2019
Boitumelo Babuseng	Democratic Alliance	21 May 2014	7 May 2019
Martha Bartlett	African National Congress	21 May 2014	7 May 2019
Juanita Beukes	African National Congress	21 May 2014	7 May 2019
Alexandra Beukes	African National Congress	21 May 2014	7 May 2019
John Block	African National Congress	21 May 2014	15 October 2015
Alvin Botes	African National Congress	21 May 2014	27 February 2018
Tiny Chotelo	African National Congress	21 May 2014	7 May 2019
Grizelda Cjiekella	African National Congress	21 May 2014	28 August 2015
Ouneas Dikgetsi	Congress of the People	21 May 2014	7 May 2019
Thapelo Dithebe	African National Congress	21 May 2014	7 May 2019
Isak Fritz	Democratic Alliance	21 May 2014	7 May 2019
Harold McGluwa	Democratic Alliance	21 May 2014	7 May 2019
Melinda Hattingh	Democratic Alliance	16 March 2016	7 May 2019
Mac Jack	African National Congress	21 May 2014	7 May 2019
Maruping Lekwene	African National Congress	June 2014	7 May 2019
Andrew Louw	Democratic Alliance	21 May 2014	7 May 2019
Sylvia Lucas	African National Congress	21 May 2014	7 May 2019
Patrick Mabilo	African National Congress	27 February 2018	7 May 2019
Sylvia Lucas	African National Congress	21 May 2014	7 May 2019
Fufe Makatong	African National Congress	21 May 2014	7 May 2019
Mase Manopole	African National Congress	10 October 2017	7 May 2019
April Matebus	Economic Freedom Fighters	12 May 2015	2016
Bongiwe Mbinqo-Gigaba	African National Congress	21 May 2014	7 May 2019
Kenny Mmoiemang	African National Congress	21 May 2014	7 May 2019
Lebogang Motlhaping	African National Congress	21 May 2014	7 May 2019
George Nyakama	Economic Freedom Fighters	1 September 2016	2017
Ismail Obaray	Democratic Alliance	21 May 2014	7 May 2019
Goganamang Gladys Oliphant	African National Congress	21 May 2014	2017
Dawid Rooi	African National Congress	21 May 2014	3 October 2017
Norman Shushu	African National Congress	21 May 2014	7 May 2019
Mxolisa Sokatsha	African National Congress	21 May 2014	7 May 2019
Safiyia Stanfley	Democratic Alliance	21 May 2014	7 May 2019
Pule Thole	Democratic Alliance	21 May 2014	15 March 2016
Shadrack Tlhaole	Economic Freedom Fighters	14 November 2017	7 May 2019
Gift van Staden	African National Congress	27 October 2015	7 May 2019
Bentley Vass	African National Congress	3 October 2017	7 May 2019
Pauline Williams	African National Congress	27 October 2015	7 May 2019
