= Politics of the Northern Cape =

Like South Africa's eight other provinces, the Northern Cape is governed by a parliamentary system, in which the Premier of the Northern Cape is elected by the Northern Cape Provincial Legislature and in turn selects the Northern Cape Executive Council. As in most other provinces, the African National Congress (ANC) has led the Northern Cape Provincial Government since the end of apartheid. In the most recent provincial election, held in 2024, the ANC lost three seats and lost its outright majority, while remaining the largest party at 15 seats in the provincial legislature and the Democratic Alliance remained as the official opposition in the legislature. Pursuant to the same election, Zamani Saul was elected Premier of the province.

== Political history ==
The Northern Cape was one of three provinces created in the dissolution of the former Cape Province at the end of apartheid; the others are the Eastern Cape and the Western Cape. Parts of the Northern Cape also previously belonged to the nominally independent bantustan of Bophuthatswana, a common destination for black residents forcibly resettled by the apartheid government under the Group Areas Act. During the 1980s, anti-apartheid organisations were active in the province's townships, particularly Galeshewe in Kimberley and Pabalello in Upington.

== Government ==
=== Executive Council ===
The current composition of the Northern Cape Executive Council is as follows:

Portfolio	MEC
Premier	Zamani Saul
Health	Maruping Lekwene
Agriculture, Environmental Affairs, Rural Development and Land Reform	Mase Manopole
Social Development, Youth, Women, and People living with Disabilities	Nontobeko Vilakazi
Sports, Arts, and Culture	Mangaliso Matika
Finance, Economic Development and Tourism	Venus Blennies
Roads and Public Works	Fufe Makatong
Education	Abraham Vosloo
Cooperative Governance, Human Settlements, Traditional Affairs	Bentley Vass
Transport, Safety and Liaison	Limakatso Koloi

== Elections ==
In the 2019 provincial election, the African National Congress retained its longstanding majority in the Northern Cape Provincial Legislature, winning 18 of 30 seats – although this represented a loss of two seats since the 2014 provincial election. In 2019, the largest opposition party in the province was the Democratic Alliance (eight seats), followed by the Economic Freedom Fighters (three seats); the only other party to win representation in the legislature was Freedom Front Plus. In other legislative terms, the Congress of the People and the Independent Democrats have also held seats in the provincial legislature. A series of local by-elections were held in the province in 2020.

== See also ==
- Orania
