= Executive Council of the Northern Cape =

Provincial government in South Africa

The Executive Council of the Northern Cape is the cabinet of the executive branch of the provincial government in the South African province of the Northern Cape. The Members of the Executive Council (MECs) are appointed from among the members of the Northern Cape Provincial Legislature by the Premier of the Northern Cape, an office held since the 2019 general election by Zamani Saul of the African National Congress (ANC).

== Jenkins premiership: 2009–2013 ==
On 11 May 2009, shortly after the 2009 general election, newly elected Premier Hazel Jenkins announced her new Executive Council. The council remained in place under Grizelda Cjiekella, the Education MEC, who acted as Premier after Jenkins suffered a stroke while delivering her 2012 State of the Province Address.

Northern Cape Executive Council 2009–2013
Post	Member	Term	
Premier of the Northern Cape	Hazel Jenkins	2009	2013
MEC for Finance, Economic Affairs and Tourism	John Block	2009	2013
MEC for Health	Mxolisi Sokatsha	2009	2013
MEC for Education	Grizelda Cjiekella	2009	2013
MEC for Roads and Public Works	Dawid Rooi	2009	2013
MEC for Transport, Safety and Liaison	Patrick Mabilo	2009	2013
MEC for Agriculture, Land Reform and Rural Development	Norman Shushu	2009	2013
MEC for Environment and Nature Conservation	Sylvia Lucas	2009	2013
MEC for Cooperative Governance, Human Settlement and Traditional Affairs	Kenny Mmoiemang	2009	2013
MEC for Social Services and Population	Alvin Botes	2009	2013
MEC for Sport, Arts and Culture	Pauline Williams	2009	2013

== Lucas premiership ==
=== First term: 2013–2014 ===
In May 2013, Sylvia Lucas was sworn in as Northern Cape Premier after Hazel Jenkins formally resigned from the office. She retained Jenkins's Executive Council until 4 June 2013, when she announced a minor cabinet reshuffle, moving some MECs to new portfolios and appointing Tiny Chotelo and Mac Jack to fill vacancies created by her own election as Premier and the election of Kenny Mmoiemang as the Speaker of the Northern Cape Provincial Legislature.

Northern Cape Executive Council 2013–2014
Post	Member	Term	
Premier of the Northern Cape	Sylvia Lucas	2013	2014
MEC for Finance, Economic Affairs and Tourism	John Block	2013	2014
MEC for Health	Mxolisi Sokatsha	2013	2014
MEC for Education	Grizelda Cjiekella	2013	2014
MEC for Roads and Public Works	Dawid Rooi	2013	2014
MEC for Transport, Safety and Liaison	Mac Jack	2013	2014
MEC for Transport, Safety and Liaison	Patrick Mabilo	2013	2013
MEC for Agriculture, Land Reform and Rural Development	Norman Shushu	2013	2014
MEC for Environment and Nature Conservation	Patrick Mabilo	2013	2014
MEC for Cooperative Governance, Human Settlement and Traditional Affairs	Alvin Botes	2013	2014
MEC for Cooperative Governance, Human Settlement and Traditional Affairs	Kenny Mmoiemang	2013	2013
MEC for Social Development	Tiny Chotelo	2013	2014
MEC for Social Services and Population	Alvin Botes	2013	2013
MEC for Sport, Arts and Culture	Pauline Williams	2013	2014

=== Second term: 2014–2019 ===
Lucas was elected to her first full term as Premier in the 2014 general election and she announced her new Executive Council on 30 May 2014. Although several MECs changed portfolios, only two from the previous term – Patrick Mabilo and Pauline Williams – were dropped entirely; Lebogang Motlhaping and Barbara Bartlett were appointed in their stead. In late February 2016, Lucas announced a wide-ranging reshuffle in which only three MECs retained their original portfolios, although none were fired. Three vacancies had arisen due to the death of Education MEC Grizelda Cjiekella, the resignation of Finance MEC John Block, and the resignation of Public Works MEC Dawid Rooi; three new MECs – Bongiwe Mbinqo-Gigaba, Gift van Staden, and Pauline Williams (who had been an MEC until 2014) – were appointed in their stead.

On 10 May 2017, Lucas announced a controversial reshuffle, in which Bongiwe Mbinqo-Gigaba and Mxolisi Sokatsha swopped portfolios, and, more significantly, Finance MEC Mac Jack and Transport MEC Pauline Williams were fired and replaced by Gail Parker and Alexandra Beukes respectively. The Northern Cape branch of the ANC said that it had not been consulted about the reshuffle and responded with "absolute disgust", calling it "grossly irresponsible, reckless and self-serving" and alleging that it constituted an attempt by Lucas to influence the outcomes of a party elective conference scheduled for the next weekend. The provincial party called for Lucas to reverse the reshuffle and the ANC National Executive Committee ultimately intervened to instruct her to do so; on 1 June, Lucas announced that she would comply, meaning that Parker and Beukes would lose their new positions.

In February 2018, Lucas announced another reshuffle, removing Alvin Botes and Lebogang Motlhaping from the Executive Council and appointing Bentley Vass and Fufe Makatong. Lucas said that her decision had been influenced by the ANC's decision to move Botes to the National Assembly and by the need to ensure that senior party officials were represented in the Executive Council; Vass and Makatong were the Northern Cape ANC's Deputy Provincial Chairperson and Provincial Treasurer respectively.

Northern Cape Executive Council 2014–2019
Post	Member	Term	
Premier of the Northern Cape	Sylvia Lucas	2014	2019
MEC for Finance, Economic Development and Tourism	Mac Jack	2017	2019
MEC for Finance, Economic Development and Tourism	Gail Parker	2017	2017
MEC for Finance, Economic Development and Tourism	Mac Jack	2016	2017
MEC for Finance, Economic Development and Tourism	John Block	2014	2015
MEC for Health	Fufe Makatong	2018	2019
MEC for Health	Lebogang Motlhaping	2016	2018
MEC for Health	Mac Jack	2014	2016
MEC for Education	Barbara Bartlett	2016	2019
MEC for Education	Grizelda Cjiekella	2014	2015
MEC for Infrastructure and Public Works	Mxolisi Sokatsha	2017	2019
MEC for Infrastructure and Public Works	Bongiwe Mbinqo-Gigaba	2017	2017
MEC for Infrastructure and Public Works	Mxolisi Sokatsha	2016	2017
MEC for Infrastructure and Public Works	Dawid Rooi	2014	2016
MEC for Transport, Safety and Liaison	Lebogang Motlhaping	2018	2019
MEC for Transport, Safety and Liaison	Pauline Williams	2017	2018
MEC for Transport, Safety and Liaison	Alexandra Beukes	2017	2017
MEC for Transport, Safety and Liaison	Pauline Williams	2016	2017
MEC for Transport, Safety and Liaison	Barbara Bartlett	2014	2016
MEC for Agriculture, Land Reform and Rural Development	Norman Shushu	2014	2019
MEC for Environment and Nature Conservation	Pauline Williams	2018	2019
MEC for Environment and Nature Conservation	Tiny Chotelo	2014	2018
MEC for Cooperative Governance, Human Settlement and Traditional Affairs	Bentley Vass	2018	2019
MEC for Cooperative Governance, Human Settlement and Traditional Affairs	Alvin Botes	2014	2018
MEC for Social Development	Gift van Staden	2016	2019
MEC for Social Development	Mxolisi Sokatsha	2014	2016
MEC for Sport, Arts and Culture	Bongiwe Mbinqo-Gigaba	2017	2019
MEC for Sport, Arts and Culture	Mxolisi Sokatsha	2017	2017
MEC for Sport, Arts and Culture	Bongiwe Mbinqo-Gigaba	2016	2017
MEC for Sport, Arts and Culture	Lebogang Motlhaping	2014	2016

== Saul premiership: 2019–present ==
=== First term: 2019–2024 ===
On 29 May 2019, after the 2019 general election, newly elected Premier Zamani Saul announced his new Executive Council, which retained only three MECs from the previous administration and which merged the province's Agriculture and Land Reform portfolio with Environmental Affairs and Conservation. After Berenice Sinexve and Barbara Bartlett resigned, Saul announced his first reshuffle on 26 June 2020; all but two MECs changed portfolios, but none were fired.

Education MEC Mac Jack died in August 2020 and was replaced by Zolile Monakali in September. On 26 October 2022, Saul appointed Venus Blennies as MEC for Youth, Women, Disability, Communications and E-Government, a newly created portfolio located in the Office of the Premier.

Northern Cape Executive Council 2019–2024
Post	Member	Term	
Premier of the Northern Cape	Zamani Saul	2019	2024
MEC for Finance, Economic Development and Tourism	Abraham Vosloo	2020	2024
MEC for Finance, Economic Development and Tourism	Maruping Lekwene	2019	2020
MEC for Health	Maruping Lekwene	2020	2024
MEC for Health	Mase Manopole	2019	2020
MEC for Education	Zolile Monakali	2020	2024
MEC for Education	Mac Jack	2019	2020
MEC for Roads and Public Works	Fufe Makatong	2020	2024
MEC for Roads and Public Works	Abraham Vosloo	2019	2020
MEC for Transport, Safety and Liaison	Nomandla Bloem	2020	2024
MEC for Transport, Safety and Liaison	Nontobeko Vilakazi	2019	2020
MEC for Land Reform, Agriculture and Nature Conservation and Environmental Affairs	Mase Manopole	2020	2024
MEC for Land Reform, Agriculture and Nature Conservation and Environmental Affairs	Nomandla Bloem	2019	2020
MEC for Cooperative Governance, Human Settlement and Traditional Affairs	Bentley Vass	2019	2024
MEC for Social Development	Nontobeko Vilakazi	2020	2024
MEC for Social Development	Barbara Bartlett	2019	2020
MEC for Sport, Arts and Culture	Desery Fienies	2020	2024
MEC for Sport, Arts and Culture	Berenice Sinexve	2019	2020
MEC for Youth, Women, Disability, Communications and E-Government	Venus Blennies	2022	2024

=== Second term: 2024–present ===
On 27 June 2024, following the 2024 general election, Saul named his executive council for his second term as premier. Saul reduced the number of portfolios from ten to seven, while keeping the ten departments. Saul recreated the formerly standalone Transport, Safety and Liaison and Sports, Arts and Culture portfolios during a cabinet reshuffle in January 2025. Saul reshuffled his executive in January 2026 again following the resignation of Maruping Lekwene. Roads and Public Works MEC Fufe Makatong resigned from office on 31 July 2026. On 14 August 2026, Saul officially accepted Makatong's resignation and conducted a reshuffle of his executive council.

Northern Cape Executive Council 2024–present
Post	Member	Term	
Premier of the Northern Cape	Zamani Saul	2024	Incumbent
MEC for Health	Nontobeko Vilakazi	2026	Incumbent
MEC for Health	Maruping Lekwene	2024	2025
MEC for Agriculture, Environmental Affairs, Rural Development and Land Reform	Newrene Klaaste	2026	Incumbent
MEC for Agriculture, Environmental Affairs, Rural Development and Land Reform	Lebogang Motlhaping	2026	2026
MEC for Agriculture, Environmental Affairs, Rural Development and Land Reform	Mase Manopole	2024	2026
MEC for Social Development, Youth, Women and People living with Disabilities	Mase Manopole	2026	2026
MEC for Social Development, Youth, Women and People living with Disabilities	Nontobeko Vilakazi	2024	2026
MEC for Social Development	Mase Manopole	2026	Incumbent
MEC in the Premier's Office, responsible for Children, Women, Youth and Persons living with Disabilities	Mirriam Kibi	2026	Incumbent
MEC for Sports, Arts, and Culture	Mangaliso Matika	2025	Incumbent
MEC for Finance, Economic Development and Tourism	Venus Blennies	2024	Incumbent
MEC for Roads and Public Works	Bentley Vass	2026	Incumbent
MEC for Roads and Public Works	Fufe Makatong	2024	2026
MEC for Cooperative Governance, Human Settlements, Traditional Affairs	Lebogang Motlhaping	2026	Incumbent
MEC for Cooperative Governance, Human Settlements, Traditional Affairs	Bentley Vass	2024	2026
MEC for Transport, Safety and Liaison	Limakatso Koloi	2025	Incumbent
MEC for Education	Abraham Vosloo	2024	Incumbent

== See also ==
- Template:Northern Cape Executive Council
- Government of South Africa
- Constitution of South Africa
- Cape Province
