= Norman Shushu =

South African politician (born 1969)

Member of the Northern Cape Executive Council for Agriculture, Land Reform and Rural Development
- In office May 2009 – May 2019
- Premier: Hazel Jenkins; Sylvia Lucas
- Preceded by: Tina Joemat-Pettersson
- Succeeded by: Nomandla Bloem (for Land Reform, Agriculture and Nature Conservation and Environmental Affairs)

Personal details
- Born: Gothatamang Norman Jonathan Shushu; 18 February 1969 (age 57) Galeshewe, Kimberley; Cape Province, South Africa
- Party: African National Congress
- Other political affiliations: South African Communist Party

Gothatamang Norman Jonathan Shushu (born 18 February 1969) is a South African politician who served in the Northern Cape Executive Council from 2009 to 2019. During that period, he was Member of the Executive Council (MEC) for Agriculture, Land Reform and Rural Development.

A teacher by training, Shushu is a member of the African National Congress and a prominent figure in the South African Communist Party in the Northern Cape. He lost his seat in the Northern Cape Provincial Legislature in the 2019 general election.

== Early life and activism ==
Shushu was born on 18 February 1969 in Galeshewe, a township in Kimberley in the present-day Northern Cape. He was the youngest of several siblings. In Galeshewe, he became involved in anti-apartheid youth politics and in the 1980s he was detained without trial under the Internal Security Act. He matriculated in 1990 and earned a teaching diploma at Bloemfontein's Vista University before beginning work as a teacher in Ikhutseng in 1994. He became an active member of the South African Democratic Teachers Union.

== Provincial government ==
Shushu subsequently worked in the Northern Cape Provincial Government from 1999 to 2009: he was the Head of Office in the office of the Member of the Executive Council (MEC) for Education from 1999 to 2004, and then the Head of Office in the office of the MEC for Finance and Economic Affairs from 2004 to 2009. During this period, in 2008, he was elected for the first time as Provincial Secretary of the Northern Cape branch of the South African Communist Party (SACP).

In the 2009 general election, Shushu was elected to the Northern Cape Provincial Legislature and was himself appointed to the Northern Cape Executive Council as MEC for Agriculture, Land Reform and Rural Development. He was re-elected to his legislative seat in the 2014 general election, ranked fifth on the ANC's provincial party list, and was also retained in his portfolio as MEC. However, in the 2019 general election, he was ranked 22nd on the ANC's party list and was not re-elected to the provincial legislature. He subsequently served as a special adviser to the Premier of the Northern Cape, Zamani Saul. As of 2020, he remained in his position as SACP Provincial Secretary.

== Personal life ==
Shushu is married to Mandisa.
