= Tina Joemat-Pettersson =

South African politician (1963–2023)

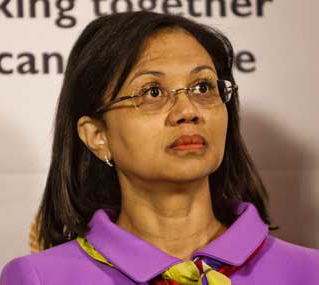
- Joemat-Pettersson in 2012

Chairperson of the Portfolio Committee on Police
- In office 2 July 2019 – 5 June 2023
- Preceded by: Francois Beukman

Minister of Energy
- In office 26 May 2014 – 30 March 2017
- President: Jacob Zuma
- Preceded by: Ben Martins
- Succeeded by: Mmamoloko Kubayi-Ngubane

Minister of Agriculture, Forestry and Fisheries
- In office 11 May 2009 – 25 May 2014
- President: Jacob Zuma
- Preceded by: Lulama Xingwana
- Succeeded by: Senzeni Zokwana

Member of the National Assembly of South Africa
- In office 22 May 2019 – 5 June 2023
- In office 6 May 2009 – 31 March 2017

Member of the Executive Council of the Northern Cape for Agriculture and Land Reform
- In office April 2004 – May 2009
- Premier: Dipuo Peters
- Preceded by: Dawid Rooi
- Succeeded by: Norman Shushu

Member of the Executive Council of the Northern Cape for Education
- In office May 1999 – April 2004
- Preceded by: New position
- Succeeded by: Archie Lucas

Member of the Executive Council of the Northern Cape for Education, Arts and Culture
- In office May 1994 – May 1999
- Preceded by: New position
- Succeeded by: Position split (herself as MEC for Education; Brian Hermanus as MEC for Sport Arts and Culture)

Member of the Northern Cape Provincial Legislature
- In office May 1994 – May 2009

Personal details
- Born: Tina Monica Joemat; 16 December 1963 Kimberley, Cape Province, South Africa
- Died: 5 June 2023 (aged 59) Rondebosch, Cape Town, South Africa
- Party: African National Congress
- Other political affiliations: South African Communist Party
- Spouse: Thorvald Pettersson (died 2006)
- Children: 2
- Education: William Pescod High School
- Alma mater: University of Cape Town; University of the Western Cape

Tina Monica Joemat-Pettersson (née Joemat; 16 December 1963 – 5 June 2023) was a South African politician who served as the Chairperson of the Portfolio Committee on Police from July 2019 until her death in June 2023. A member of the African National Congress, Joemat-Petterson had previously served as the Minister of Agriculture, Forestry and Fisheries from 2009 until 2014 and as the Minister of Energy from May 2014 until March 2017 under President Jacob Zuma.

Born in Kimberley, Joemat-Pettersson attended William Pescod High School. She earned a Bachelor of Arts in Executive Management in Education from the University of Cape Town as well as a Bachelor of Arts in English and History and a Higher Diploma in Education from the University of the Western Cape. Joemat-Pettersson worked as an educator before becoming active in politics.

Joemat-Pettersson was elected to the Northern Cape Provincial Legislature in the 1994 general elections as a member of the African National Congress. Having entered the provincial legislature, she was appointed the Member of the Executive Council (MEC) for Education, Arts and Culture. After the 1999 general elections when she was appointed MEC for only the education portfolio. She became the MEC for Agriculture and Land Reform in 2004.

Following the 2009 general elections, Joemat-Pettersson entered the National Assembly of South Africa. Thereafter, she was appointed Minister of Agriculture, Forestry and Fisheries in the First Cabinet of Jacob Zuma. After the 2014 general elections, Joemat-Pettersson became the Minister of Energy in the second cabinet of Jacob Zuma. She was fired as a minister in a cabinet reshuffle in March 2017 and then resigned her seat in the National Assembly. Joemat-Pettersson returned to the National Assembly after the 2019 general elections, was elected to chair the Portfolio Committee on Police.

== Early life and education ==
The fourth out of six children, Joemat-Pettersson was born as Tina Monica Joemat on 16 December 1963 in Kimberley in South Africa's former Cape Province. She attended William Pescod High School in Kimberley. She held a Bachelor of Arts in English and History as well as a Higher Diploma in Education from the University of the Western Cape. From the University of Cape Town, she obtained a Bachelor of Arts in Executive Management in Education.

== Early career ==
Joemat-Pettersson was a member of the Azanian Students' Organisation from 1985 to 1986. She taught at Pescodia High School in 1987 and worked as a history tutor between 1989 and 1991. In 1990, she worked as a research assistant to the English Department head at the University of the Western Cape. She was an English tutor for the National Education Coordinating Committee and the Education Development Trust and taught at the Homevale Senior Secondary School from 1992 until 1993.

In 1992, Joemat-Pettersson was also a member of the National People's Education Panellist. In the same year, she was a South African Democratic Teachers Union national representative, a member of the Union of Democratic University Staff Association and a regional delegate to the national education and cultural desk of the African National Congress. Joemat-Pettersson worked as a lecturer at the English Department of the University of the Free State from 1993 until 1994.

== Career in the Northern Cape government: 1994–2009 ==
A member of the African National Congress, Joemat-Pettersson was elected to the newly established Northern Cape Provincial Legislature in the 1994 general elections, the first elections to be held under universal suffrage. Having entered the provincial legislature, Joemat-Petterson was appointed to the first Executive Council of the Northern Cape by premier Manne Dipico as the Member of the Executive Council (MEC) for the Education, Arts and Culture portfolio. She was 30 years old at the time and her appointment was met with skepticism. Following the 1999 general elections, she remained as a Member of the Executive Council, now with the responsibility for only the Education portfolio. During her tenure as MEC for Education, the Northern Cape had the highest matriculation rate and managed to reduce the number of schools with a pass rate of less than 20% to zero in 2000.

After the 2004 general elections, Dipuo Peters succeeded Dipico as premier and announced her executive council, in which she appointed Joemat-Pettersson as the MEC for Agriculture and Land Reform. Gomolemo Lucas took over the Education portfolio. In 2006, Joemat-Pettersson was ranked as the best-performing MEC for Agriculture in the country by an agricultural magazine.

== Career in national government ==
=== Minister of Agriculture, Forestry and Fisheries: 2009–2014 ===
Joemat-Pettersson was elected to the National Assembly of South Africa in the 2009 national elections. Shortly afterwards, she was appointed Minister of Agriculture, Forestry and Fisheries by president Jacob Zuma.

In November 2012, Public Protector Thuli Madonsela found that Joemat-Pettersson had violated the Executive Ethics Code by unlawfully incurring return flights for her children and an au pair from Sweden to South Africa in January 2010. The plane tickets, which cost R151 878, had been paid for with public money, in contravention of the guidelines of the Ministerial Handbook. Madonsela also found that she had violated the Ethics Code by staying at expensive hotels in Pretoria and Cape Town, which amounted to R900 795, while waiting for official residencies to be allocated to her. Madonsela recommended that Joemat-Pettersson be reprimanded by Zuma. Zuma wrote to National Assembly Speaker Max Sisulu in March 2013, informing him that he had reprimanded Joemat-Pettersson for violating the Executive Ethics Code.

In December 2013, Madonsela found Joemat-Pettersson guilty of maladministration for overseeing the irregular awarding of an R800 million-tender to Sekunjalo Marine Services Consortium to manage the Department of Agriculture, Forestry and Fisheries' fishery, research and patrol boats and trying to interfere in an investigation into the contract. The contract was cancelled and the South African Navy was tasked with overseeing the vessels, which led to the vessels not being used for a period of over twenty months. Joemat-Pettersson unsuccessfully tried to challenge Madonsela's report on the matter, but her appeal was dismissed by the North Gauteng High Court on 13 March 2017.

=== Minister of Energy: 2014–2017 ===
Having been re-elected in the 2014 general election, Joemat-Pettersson was appointed to serve as Minister of Energy in Zuma's second cabinet.

In late-2015, the Strategic Fuel Fund (SFF) sold 10 million barrels of South Africa's oil reserves at the low price of $29 a barrel to private enterprises, when the price of oil was $49 a barrel. Joemat-Pettersson said in her budget speech to the National Assembly in 2016 that the fuel had not been sold, but rotated. Joemat-Pettersson's successor as Minister of Energy, Mmamoloko Kubayi later told the parliamentary committee on energy that the oil reserves had been sold and not rotated. Public Protector Busisiwe Mkhwebane found in September 2020 that Joemat-Pettersson had no involvement in the sale and that she was misled by the then-head of the Strategic Fuel Fund Association, Sibusiso Gamede. In November of the same year, the Western Cape High Court reversed the sale.

In September 2014, Joemat-Pettersson signed an Intergovernmental Agreement with Russia for state nuclear firm Rosatom to build up to 9.6GW (8 NPP units) of nuclear power plants in South Africa by 2030. The agreement would have cost up to R1 trillion. In October 2015, Earthlife Africa Johannesburg and the Southern African Faith Communities' Environment Institute (Saifcei) started a court case with both organisations challenging the national government's decision to procure nuclear energy without debating it in parliament first. In April 2017, Western Cape High Court Judge Lee Bozalek ruled in favour of the two organisations' case, declaring that the government's efforts to acquire 9.6 GW of nuclear energy as well as Joemat-Pettersson's move for Eskom to procure nuclear energy as unlawful.

Joemat-Pettersson was sacked as Minister of Energy by Zuma in a late-night cabinet reshuffle on 30 March 2017. Mmamoloko Kubayi was appointed to succeed her. Joemat-Pettersson then resigned from Parliament the following day.

== Return to Parliament: 2019 ==
Joemat-Pettersson was elected back to Parliament in the 2019 general elections. She was then announced as the ANC's candidate to chair the Portfolio Committee on Police. She was elected chairperson of the committee on 2 July 2019, defeating Democratic Alliance MP Andrew Whitfield in a vote that went 5 votes for her and 3 for Whitfield.

On 7 April 2021, she became a member of the Committee for Section 194 Enquiry, which was established to determine whether Public Protector Busisiwe Mkhwebane should be removed from office or not.

== Career in the ANC ==
Joemat-Pettersson was elected chairperson of the African National Congress Women's League in the Northern Cape in 1998. In the same year, she was elected provincial chairperson of the South African Communist Party and to the Central Committee of the South African Communist Party. She was elected treasurer of the ANC Provincial Executive Committee in 2003, a position she would hold until the next ANC provincial conference in 2008 when she was succeeded by Yolanda Botha.

Joemat-Pettersson was first elected to the African National Congress' 80 member National Executive Committee (NEC) at the party's 52nd National conference held in December 2007 after receiving the 78th most votes. She was then elected by the NEC to serve on the party's National Working Committee (NWC) which is responsible for the day-to-day running of the party.

Joemat-Pettersson endorsed Zuma's re-election campaign for ANC president in October 2012. At the ANC's 53rd National Conference held in December 2012, Zuma was re-elected for a second term as ANC president and Joemat-Pettersson was re-elected to the NEC. She was then re-elected to the NWC by the NEC members in January 2013.

Joemat-Pettersson was re-elected to the ANC NEC at the party's 54th National Conference and in January 2018 the NEC re-elected her to the party's National Working Committee.

In December 2022 during the ANC's 55th National Conference, Joemat-Pettersson was nominated from the conference floor by Northern Cape delegates to contest the position of First Deputy Secretary-General against Nomvula Mokonyane. Her nomination managed to clear the 25% threshold for her to be on the ballot due to support from Western Cape and Eastern Cape delegates. Mokonyane won the election. Joemat-Pettersson was then nominated for the NEC again and was re-elected to a seat in the NEC; by the number of votes, she ranked 13th, receiving 1726 votes across the 4,029 ballots cast in total. In January 2023, Joemat-Pettersson was re-elected to the National Working Committee.

== Personal life ==
Joemat-Pettersson was married to Swedish businessman Thorvald Pettersson, who died in 2006. Together they had two sons, Austin and Terrence.

=== Death ===
Joemat-Pettersson died on 5 June 2023 at home in Rondebosch, Cape Town, as confirmed by ANC chief whip in Parliament Pemmy Majodina. She was 59.

Her death followed allegations of extortion in which she, Pemmy Majodina and Richard Dyantyi, the chairperson of Parliament's section 193 committee into the fitness of suspended Public Protector Busisiwe Mkhwebane were implicated. The three are alleged to have asked Mkhwebane's husband for a bribe of R600,000 "to make the inquiry go away".

On 20 June 2023, the South African Police Service announced an inquest into her death, after uncovering sufficient evidence that her death was not due to natural causes.

== See also ==
- List of members of the National Assembly of South Africa who died in office
