= Nomandla Bloem =

South African politician

Northern Cape MEC for Transport and Safety Liaison
- In office 26 June 2020 – 27 June 2024
- Premier: Zamani Saul
- Preceded by: Nontobeko Vilakazi
- Succeeded by: Bentley Vass

Northern Cape MEC for Land Reform, Agriculture and Nature Conservation and Environmental Affairs
- In office 29 May 2019 – 26 June 2020
- Premier: Zamani Saul
- Preceded by: New position
- Succeeded by: Mase Manopole

Member of the Northern Cape Provincial Legislature
- In office 22 May 2019 – 28 May 2024

Personal details
- Party: African National Congress
- Occupation: Politician

Sylvia Nomandla Bloem is a South African politician who served as the Northern Cape MEC for Transport and Safety Liaison from June 2020 until June 2024 2024 and as a member of the Northern Cape Provincial Legislature from May 2019 until May 2024. From May 2019 to June 2020, she served as the Northern Cape MEC for Land Reform, Agriculture and Nature Conservation and Environmental Affairs. Bloem is a member of the African National Congress.

== Provincial government ==
Bloem was not elected to the Northern Cape Provincial Legislature in the 2019 election, as she was placed 19th on the ANC's list and the party won only 18 seats. However, speaker Kenny Mmoiemang opted against serving in the legislature to go to parliament and the ANC chose Bloem to fill his seat. She was sworn in along with the other newly elected members on 22 May 2019.

On 28 May, premier Zamani Saul appointed Bloem Member of the Executive Council for the newly created Land Reform, Agriculture and Nature Conservation and Environmental Affairs portfolio. She was sworn in on the same day.

Bloem served in the position until her appointment as the MEC for Transport and Safety Liaison in June 2020. She succeeded Nontobeko Vilakazi, while Mase Manopole succeeded her as the MEC for Land Reform, Agriculture and Nature Conservation and Environmental Affairs.

Bloem was not re-elected to the Provincial Legislature in the 2024 provincial election, having been ranked low on the ANC's provincial electoral list.

Political offices
Preceded by Nontobeko Vilakazi	Northern Cape MEC for Transport and Safety Liaison; 2020–2024	Succeeded by Bentley Vass
Preceded by New position	Northern Cape MEC for Land Reform, Agriculture and Nature Conservation and Environmental Affairs; 2019–2020	Succeeded by Mase Manopole
