= Mirriam Kibi =

South African politician (born 1957)

Mirriam Kibi MPL

Northern Cape MEC in the Premier's Office, responsible for Children, Women, Youth and Persons living with Disabilities
- Incumbent
- Assumed office 19 August 2026
- Premier: Zamani Saul
- Preceded by: Office created

Member of the Northern Cape Provincial Legislature
- Incumbent
- Assumed office 14 June 2024

Member of the National Assembly of South Africa
- In office 22 May 2019 – 28 May 2024

Personal details
- Born: 25 January 1957 (age 69)
- Party: African National Congress

Mirriam Thenjiwe Kibi (born 25 January 1957) is a South African politician who was elected to the South African parliament at the 2019 general election as a representative of the African National Congress. She was elected to the Northern Cape Provincial Legislature in 2024. In August 2026, Kibi was appointed to the Executive Council of the Northern Cape as the Member of the Executive Council (MEC) in the Premier's office responsible for Children, Women, Youth, and Persons living with Disabilities.

== Parliamentary career ==
In 2019, she stood for election to the South African National Assembly as the first candidate on the African National Congress's Northern Cape regional list. At the election, she won a seat in parliament. Upon election, she became an alternate member of the Portfolio Committee on Cooperative Governance and Traditional Affairs and a member of the Portfolio Committee on Public Service and Administration, Performance Monitoring & Evaluation.

== Northern Cape government ==
Kibi was elected to the Northern Cape Provincial Legislature during the 2024 Northern Cape provincial election. In August 2026, premier Zamani Saul conducted a reshuffle of his executive council which saw Kibi appointed as the Member of the Executive Council (MEC) in the Premier's office, responsible for Children, Women, Youth, and Persons living with Disabilities.
