= Dawid Rooi =

South African politician

Member of the Northern Cape Provincial Legislature
- In office 1999 – 3 October 2017

Member of the Northern Cape Executive Council for Infrastructure and Public Works
- In office 30 May 2014 – February 2016
- Premier: Sylvia Lucas
- Preceded by: Position established
- Succeeded by: Mxolisi Sokatsha

Member of the Northern Cape Executive Council for Roads and Public Works
- In office 11 May 2009 – 30 May 2014
- Premier: Hazel Jenkins; Sylvia Lucas
- Succeeded by: Position abolished

Personal details
- Born: 22 July 1965 (age 60) Klipfontein, Namakwa; Cape Province, South Africa
- Party: African National Congress
- Other political affiliations: National Union of Mineworkers

Dawid Rooi (born 22 July 1965) is a South African politician and former trade unionist who represented the African National Congress (ANC) in the Northern Cape Provincial Legislature from 1999 to 2017. During that time, he served continuously in the Northern Cape Executive Council from 2009 to 2016: he was the Northern Cape's Member of the Executive Council (MEC) for Roads and Public Works from 2009 to 2014 and MEC for Infrastructure and Public Works from 2014 to 2016. A former mineworker, Rooi rose to political prominence through the National Union of Mineworkers.

== Early life and career ==
Rooi was born on 22 July 1965 in Klipfontein in Namakwa in the former Cape Province. He was expelled from high school due to his political activities but matriculated in 1993 while employed at an Alexkor diamond mine, where he worked from 1987 until 1999. He joined the National Union of Mineworkers (NUM) in 1987 and rose through the union's ranks to become a branch chairperson in 1996. He served as NUM Regional Chairperson and was a member of the NUM's national executive committee from 1996 to 1999.

== Legislative career ==
In 1999, Rooi was elected to an ANC seat in the Northern Cape Provincial Legislature. During the legislative term that followed, he chaired the legislature's Standing Committee on Public Accounts. Towards the end of the term, in 2004, he also served briefly as MEC for Agriculture, Land Reform and Environment. He was re-elected to his seat in the 2004 general election and in the 2009 general election, and on 11 May 2009, Premier Hazel Jenkins announced that he would return to the Executive Council as MEC for Roads and Public Works. He held that portfolio throughout Jenkins' term and into the term of her successor, Premier Sylvia Lucas.

In the 2014 general election, Rooi was elected to his fourth term in the provincial legislature, ranked 11th on the ANC's provincial party list. After the election, on 30 May 2014, Lucas re-appointed him to the Executive Council with responsibility for the reconfigured portfolio of Infrastructure and Public Works. In February 2016, he resigned from the Executive Council. He remained an ordinary Member of the Provincial Legislature until early October 2017, when he resigned his seat; Bentley Vass filled the vacancy left by his departure.

== Personal life ==
Rooi is married to Magdalene Rooi, with whom he has five children.
