= Venus Blennies =

South African politician (born 1995)

Venus Lorato Blennies-Magage MPL

Northern Cape MEC for Finance, Economic Development and Tourism
- Incumbent
- Assumed office 28 June 2024
- Premier: Zamani Saul
- Preceded by: Abraham Vosloo

Northern Cape MEC for Youth, Women, Disability, Communication and E-Government
- In office 26 October 2022 – 14 June 2024
- Premier: Zamani Saul
- Preceded by: Office established
- Succeeded by: Office abolished

Member of the Northern Cape Provincial Legislature
- Incumbent
- Assumed office 18 October 2022
- Preceded by: David Dichaba

Personal details
- Born: 25 September 1995 (age 30)
- Party: African National Congress
- Spouse: Rorisang Magage
- Children: 2
- Education: LLB Degree
- Profession: Politician

Lorato Venus Blennies-Magage (born 25 September 1995) is a South African politician who has been the Member of the Executive Council (MEC) for Finance, Economic Development and Tourism of the Northern Cape since June 2024 and a Member of the Northern Cape Provincial Legislature since October 2022. She was previously the MEC for Youth, Women, Disability, Communication and E-Government between October 2022 and June 2024. Blennies is a member of the African National Congress.

== Career ==
Blennies is a member of the African National Congress as well as a senior member of the party's youth wing, the African National Congress Youth League. In September 2022, Blennies and two other ANC Youth League officials, Khulekani Mondli Skhosana and Stella Mondlane, had been given permission by the Russian government to be election observers of the internationally condemned referendums Russia held in occupied territories of Eastern Ukraine asking citizens if they want their regions to be annexed into Russia. Blennies said in an interview with a Russian journalist that she had spoken to voters in the Donetsk Oblast and they told her: "This is a moment they have always been waiting for. Some of them have stated that it’s been about eight years of waiting for this moment."

The Democratic Alliance Shadow Minister for International Relations and Co-Operation Darren Bergman condemned Blennies and the two other ANC Youth League representatives and wrote to the Minister of Internal Affairs of Ukraine, Denys Monastyrsky, calling on him to declare Blennies and the other two as "undesirable persons" so that they could be removed from the Donbas region, which is internationally still considered Ukrainian territory.

== Northern Cape Provincial Government ==
On 18 October 2022, Blennies was sworn in as a member of the Northern Cape Provincial Legislature for the ANC. She replaced David Dichaba who resigned. On 26 October 2022, premier Zamani Saul reconstituted his executive council and announced that Blennies had been appointed the Member of the Executive Council (MEC) for the newly created Youth, Women, Disability, Communication and E-Government portfolio.

Following the 2024 provincial election, Blennies became the MEC for Finance, Economic Development and Tourism.
