= Lebogang Motlhaping =

South African politician

Northern Cape MEC for Cooperative Governance, Human Settlements and Traditional Affairs
- Incumbent
- Assumed office 14 August 2026
- Premier: Zamani Saul
- Preceded by: Bentley Vass

Northern Cape MEC for Agriculture, Environmental Affairs, Rural Development and Land Reform
- In office 16 January 2026 – 14 August 2026
- Premier: Zamani Saul
- Preceded by: Mase Manopole
- Succeeded by: Newrene Klaaste

Northern Cape MEC for Transport, Safety and Liaison
- In office 15 February 2018 – 7 May 2019
- Premier: Sylvia Lucas
- Preceded by: Pauline Williams
- Succeeded by: Nontobeko Vilakazi

Northern Cape MEC for Health
- In office 2 March 2016 – 15 February 2018
- Premier: Sylvia Lucas
- Preceded by: Mac Jack
- Succeeded by: Fufe Makatong

Northern Cape MEC for Sports, Arts and Culture
- In office 30 May 2014 – 2 March 2016
- Premier: Sylvia Lucas
- Preceded by: Pauline Williams
- Succeeded by: Bongiwe Mbinqo-Gigaba

Member of the Northern Cape Provincial Legislature
- Incumbent
- Assumed office 14 June 2024
- In office 21 May 2014 – 7 May 2019

Personal details
- Born: Lebogang James Motlhaping; 23 November 1971 (age 54) Kuruman, Cape Province, South Africa
- Party: African National Congress
- Children: 4
- Profession: Politician

Lebogang James Motlhaping (born 23 November 1971) is a South African politician from the Northern Cape who has been the Member of the Executive Council for Cooperative Governance, Human Settlements and Traditional Affairs since August 2026, having previously been the Agriculture, Environmental Affairs, Rural Development and Land Reform from January 2026 to August 2026. He has been a member of the Northern Cape Provincial Legislature since June 2024. He previously served in the executive council and the provincial legislature from 2014 until 2019. Motlhaping is a member of the African National Congress.

== Early life and education ==
Lebogang James Motlhaping was born on 23 November 1971 in Kuruman in the previous Cape Province. He attended high school in Loopeng in the Bophuthatswana bantustan. He then studied at the North-West University, where he obtained a community development certificate. He received a leadership certificate at the African Political Parties School. In 1996, he achieved a certificate in ethics management from PALAMA. Motlhaping is currently studying towards a degree in public administration from MANCOSA.

== Career ==
While teaching at Bosheng Middle School, he organised for the Congress of South African Students from 1990 to 1996. He served as a member of the Black Rock Development Forum between 1995 and 1999. At the same time, he served as a district coordinator for the Mmabatho Adult Literacy and Education Trust. From 1998 to 2001, he worked as a provincial coordinator at ABET.

Motlhaping worked for Statistics South Africa between 2001 and 2002. From 2002 to 2005, he served as the regional secretary for the Kgalagadi Youth Council. He was a manager of the Kgalagadi Human Resource Development Foundation between 2004 and 2008. In 2008, he became a Mayoral Committee Member of the John Taolo Gaetsewe District Municipality. He held the post until 2010. Motlhaping was the district chairperson of the Home Affairs Forum between 2009 and 2012.

== Provincial government ==
Motlhaping was sworn in as a Member of the Northern Cape Provincial Legislature following the May 2014 provincial election. On 30 May, premier Sylvia Lucas appointed him Member of the Executive Council for Sports, Arts and Culture, succeeding Pauline Williams. Motlhaping served in the post until 2 March 2016, when Lucas moved him to the Health portfolio of the Executive Council. He succeeded Mac Jack, while Bongiwe Mbinqo-Gigaba succeeded him. On 15 February 2018, Motlhaping became the MEC for Transport, Safety and Liaison. He held this post until the 2019 general election, when he left the provincial legislature. Newly elected premier Zamani Saul appointed him the chief of staff in his office in December 2019.

Motlhaping was re-elected to the provincial legislature in the 2024 provincial election. In January 2026, he returned to the executive council as the MEC for Agriculture, Environmental Affairs, Rural Development and Land Reform. In August 2026, Saul moved him to the Cooperative Governance, Human Settlements and Traditional Affairs portfolio.
