= Tiny Chotelo =

South African politician (born 1962)

Northern Cape MEC for Nature Conservation and Environmental Affairs
- In office 30 May 2014 – 15 February 2018
- Premier: Sylvia Lucas
- Preceded by: Patrick Mabilo
- Succeeded by: Pauline Williams

Northern Cape MEC for Social Development
- In office 5 June 2013 – 30 May 2014
- Premier: Sylvia Lucas
- Preceded by: Alvin Botes
- Succeeded by: Mxolisa Sokatsha

Member of the Northern Cape Provincial Legislature
- In office 6 May 2009 – 7 May 2019

Personal details
- Born: 5 March 1962 (age 64) Gatlhose, Cape Province, South Africa
- Party: African National Congress
- Education: Batlharo Tlhaping High School
- Alma mater: Thaba Nchu College of Education; University of Port Elizabeth
- Known for: Politician

Cukelwa Magdeline Chotelo, (known as Tiny Chotelo; born 5 March 1962), is a South African politician. A member of the African National Congress, she was elected to the Northern Cape Provincial Legislature in 2009. In 2013 she was appointed Member of the Executive Council (MEC) for Social Development. She was appointed MEC for Nature Conservation and Environmental Affairs in 2014. Chotelo was demoted from the Executive Council in 2018 and left the legislature in 2019.

== Early life and education ==
Chotelo was born into a Tswana family on 5 March 1962 in Gatlhose in South Africa's former Cape Province. She attended Batlharo Tlhaping High School. She received a diploma from Thaba Nchu College of Education. From the University of Port Elizabeth she holds a higher diploma in education.

== Career ==
Chotelo was Deputy Chairperson of Women's Manyano and the Head of Department at the Gamocwaedi Primary School in Deurhaam, Kuruman. In 1996 she became a branch executive member of the ANC's Joe Morolong branch. She became the branch's deputy secretary in 1998. Chotelo was promoted to the treasurer in 2000 and became a member of the executive committee of the Kgalagadi region. In 2004 she became deputy chair of an African National Congress Women's League branch. Chotelo was elected to the provincial executive committee in 2009.

== Provincial government ==
She was elected to the Northern Cape Provincial Legislature in the general election held on 22 April 2009 and took office as a member on 6 May 2009. She was then appointed chairperson of the Agriculture, Roads and Public Works committee. In 2010 she was elected chairperson of chairpersons and chairperson of the Safety and Liaison and Roads and Public Works committee.

Chotelo was selected to be the Member of the Executive Council for Social Development by premier Sylvia Lucas on 5 June 2013. Chotelo succeeded Mxolisa Sokatsha.

After the 2014 general election, Chotelo took office for her second term as a member of the legislature on 21 May 2014. On 30 May, Lucas announced her new Executive Council. She named Chotelo the MEC for Nature Conservation and Environmental Affairs, succeeding Patrick Mabilo. She was demoted from the Executive Council in February 2018.

Chotelo left the provincial legislature in May 2019, as she did not place on the ANC's candidate list for the 2019 general election.

== Personal life ==
Chotelo is married with three children.
