= Abraham Vosloo =

South African politician

Abraham Vosloo MPL

Northern Cape MEC for Education
- Incumbent
- Assumed office 28 June 2024
- Premier: Zamani Saul
- Preceded by: Zolile Monakali

Northern Cape MEC for Finance, Economic Development and Tourism
- In office 26 June 2020 – 14 June 2024
- Premier: Zamani Saul
- Preceded by: Maruping Lekwene
- Succeeded by: Venus Blennies

Northern Cape MEC for Roads and Public Works
- In office 29 May 2019 – 26 June 2020
- Premier: Zamani Saul
- Preceded by: Mxolisa Sokatsha
- Succeeded by: Fufe Makatong

Member of the Northern Cape Provincial Legislature
- Incumbent
- Assumed office 22 May 2019

Personal details
- Born: Abraham Vosloo; 21 October 1966 (age 59) Askham, Cape Province, South Africa
- Party: African National Congress
- Education: Carlton Van Heerden High School
- Alma mater: Perseverance School
- Profession: Educator; Politician

Abraham Vosloo (born 21 October 1966) is a South African educator and politician who has been the Northern Cape's Member of the Executive Council (MEC) for Education since June 2024 and a Member of the Northern Cape Provincial Legislature since May 2019. He was the MEC for Roads and Public Works from May 2019 until June 2020, when he was appointed the MEC for Finance, Economic Development and Tourism. Vosloo was previously the Executive Mayor of the ZF Mgcawu District Municipality. He is a member of the African National Congress (ANC).

== Early life and education ==
Vosloo was born on 21 October 1966 in Askham, Cape Province. He completed his secondary education at Carlton Van Heerden High School in Upington in 1985. Vosloo went on to achieve a teacher's diploma and a high diploma from the Perseverance School in Kimberley.

== Career ==
Vosloo worked as a teacher at JJ Adams Primary School in his home town from 1990 to 1991. He was then employed at the Rosendal Primary School in Upington from 1992 until his appointment as a shop steward at SADTU. He was appointed the director of corporate services at the //Khara Hais Local Municipality in 2005; he held the post until 2012. In 2012, Vosloo was selected as municipal manager of the Kai ǃGarib Local Municipality. From 2013 to 2014, he served as the chair of the African National Congress in the ZF Mgcawu region. Vosloo was elected speaker of the district municipality in 2014. The next year, he was elected mayor of the municipality.

== Provincial government ==
After the 2019 general election held on 8 May, he was nominated to the Northern Cape Provincial Legislature. He was sworn in as a member on 22 May 2019. On 29 May 2019, Vosloo was appointed Member of the Executive Council (MEC) for Roads and Public Works, succeeding Mxolisa Sokatsha. On 26 June 2020, Vosloo was moved to the Finance, Economic Development and Tourism portfolio of the Executive Council. He succeeded Maruping Lekwene, while Fufe Makatong succeeded him as Public Works MEC.

In October 2020, Vosloo stated that the agricultural sector in the Northern Cape had lost almost 10,000 jobs. He also stated that this could be due to seasonal factors and the COVID-19 lockdown restrictions.

Following the 2024 provincial election, Vosloo was appointed MEC for Education by Saul.

== Personal life ==
In December 2020, Vosloo was hospitalised with COVID-19. He soon recovered in early-January 2021. His wife, Maria Minneth Vosloo, died due to complications from the virus on 23 January 2021.

Political offices
| Preceded by Maruping Lekwene | Northern Cape MEC for Education; 2024–present | Incumbent |
| Preceded by Maruping Lekwene | Northern Cape MEC for Finance, Economic Development and Tourism; 2020–2024 | Succeeded by Venus Blennies |
| Preceded by Mxolisa Sokatsha | Northern Cape MEC for Roads and Public Works; 2019–2020 | Succeeded by Fufe Makatong |
