= Nontobeko Vilakazi =

South African politician (born 1966)

Nontobeko Vilakazi MPL

Northern Cape MEC for Health
- Incumbent
- Assumed office 16 January 2026
- Premier: Zamani Saul
- Preceded by: Maruping Lekwene

Northern Cape MEC for Social Development, Youth, Women, and People living with Disabilities (Sports, Arts and Culture: 2024–2025)
- In office 28 June 2024 – 16 January 2026
- Premier: Zamani Saul
- Preceded by: New portfolio
- Succeeded by: Mase Manopole

Northern Cape MEC for Social Development
- In office 26 June 2020 – 14 June 2024
- Premier: Zamani Saul
- Preceded by: Martha Bartlett
- Succeeded by: Herself

Northern Cape MEC for Transport and Safety Liaison
- In office 29 May 2019 – 26 June 2020
- Premier: Zamani Saul
- Preceded by: Lebogang Motlhaping
- Succeeded by: Nomandla Bloem

Member of the Northern Cape Provincial Legislature
- Incumbent
- Assumed office 22 May 2019

Personal details
- Born: Nontobeko Eveline Vilakazi; 8 June 1966 (age 60)
- Party: African National Congress
- Occupation: Politician

Nontobeko Eveline Vilakazi (born 8 June 1966) is a South African politician who has been the Northern Cape MEC for Health since January 2026 and a Member of the Northern Cape Provincial Legislature for the African National Congress since 2019. Vilakazi has previously held multiple posts in the executive council.

== Politics ==
Vilakazi serves as the provincial secretary of the African National Congress Women's League.

== Provincial government ==
Vilakazi was nominated to the Northern Cape Provincial Legislature following the general election held on 8 May 2019, as she was placed 12th on the ANC's list and the party won 18 seats. She was sworn in as a member on 22 May. On 29 May, newly elected premier Zamani Saul announced his executive council. Vilakazi was appointed as the Member of the Executive Council for Transport and Safety Liaison. She took office on the same day.

On 26 June 2020, she was appointed MEC for Social Development. She assumed the position on the same day and succeeded Martha Bartlett, who was sworn in as a Delegate of the National Council of Provinces. Nomandla Bloem took over as MEC for Transport and Safety Liaison.

Following the 2024 provincial election, Vilakazi was appointed by Saul to lead the newly amalgamated Social Development, Youth, Women, People living with Disabilities, Sports, Arts, and Culture portfolio.

In a cabinet reshuffle in January 2025, Saul reestablished the position of MEC for Sports, Arts and Culture and then appointed Mangaliso Matika to lead the portfolio; Vilakazi remained as MEC for Social Development. She was moved to the health portfolio of the executive council in January 2026.

Political offices
Preceded by Maruping Lekwene	Northern Cape MEC for Health; 2026–present	Incumbent
Preceded by New portfolio	Northern Cape MEC for Social Development, Youth, Women, People living with Disabilities, Sports, Arts, and Culture; 2024–2026	Succeeded by Mase Manopole
Preceded by Martha Bartlett	Northern Cape MEC for Social Development; 2020–2024	Succeeded by Herself
Preceded by Lebogang Motlhaping	Northern Cape MEC for Transport and Safety Liaison; 2019–2020	Succeeded by Nomandla Bloem
