= Newrene Klaaste =

Speaker of the Northern Cape Provincial Legislature

The Honourable Newrene Klaaste MPL

Member of the Northern Cape Executive Council for Land Reform, Agriculture and Nature Conservation and Environmental Affairs
- Incumbent
- Assumed office 19 August 2026
- Premier: Zamani Saul
- Preceded by: Lebogang Motlhaping

Speaker of the Northern Cape Provincial Legislature
- In office 22 May 2019 – 19 August 2026
- Deputy: Mangaliso Matika
- Preceded by: Kenny Mmoiemang

Member of the Northern Cape Provincial Legislature
- Incumbent
- Assumed office 22 May 2019

Personal details
- Party: African National Congress
- Occupation: Politician

Newrene Claudine Klaaste is a South African politician who has been the Northern Cape's Member of the Executive Council (MEC) for Agriculture, Environmental Affairs, Rural Development and Land Reform since August 2026. She has been a Member of the Northern Cape Provincial Legislature for the African National Congress (ANC) since 2019. She was speaker of the legislature between 2019 and 2026. Prior to serving in the provincial legislature, she was the Speaker of the Namakwa District Municipality.
