= Fufe Makatong =

South African politician (born 1970)

Speaker of the Northern Cape Provincial Legislature
- Incumbent
- Assumed office 1 September 2026
- Preceded by: Newrene Klaaste

Northern Cape MEC for Roads and Public Works
- In office 26 June 2020 – 14 August 2026
- Premier: Zamani Saul
- Preceded by: Abraham Vosloo
- Succeeded by: Bentley Vass

Northern Cape MEC for Health
- In office 15 October 2018 – 7 May 2019
- Premier: Sylvia Lucas
- Preceded by: Lebogang Motlhaping
- Succeeded by: Mase Manopole

Member of the Northern Cape Provincial Legislature
- Incumbent
- Assumed office 12 June 2020
- In office 21 May 2014 – 7 May 2019

Personal details
- Born: Fufe Bohutsana Providence Makatong; 15 February 1970 (age 56)
- Party: African National Congress

Fufe Bohutsana Providence Makatong (born 15 February 1970) is a South African politician who has been the speaker of the Northern Cape Provincial Legislature since September 2026. She served as the Northern Cape MEC for Roads and Public Works from June 2020 until August 2026. She has served as a member of the provincial legislature since 12 June 2020, and previously from 2014 to 2019. Between 2018 and 2019, she was the MEC for Health. Makatong is the treasurer of the provincial African National Congress structure.

== Political career ==
In 2014, Makatong was elected to the Northern Cape Provincial Legislature as a member of the African National Congress.

She was elected as provincial treasurer at the ANC's elective conference in May 2017.

In a cabinet reshuffle in February 2018, Makatong was appointed as the Member of the Executive Council (MEC) for Health by premier Sylvia Lucas. She took over from Lebogang Motlhaping. She was not placed on the ANC's list for the 2019 general election and left the legislature at the dissolution of the term.

Makatong returned to the legislature on 12 June 2020. Soon after, she was appointed MEC for Roads and Public Works by the new premier, Zamani Saul. The Democratic Alliance, an opposition party, criticised her appointment.

Following the 2024 provincial election, Makatong was reappointed as the MEC for Roads and Public Works by Saul. She resigned as an MEC on 31 July 2026, citing a lack of consultation and communication with regards to the reorganisation of her department over the last few months. Saul accepted her resignation on 14 August 2026, following intervention by the National Executive Committee of the African National Congress. Two weeks later, Makatong was elected as the speaker of the legislature unopposed.
