= Theo Joubert =

South African politician

Theo Joubert MPL

Member of the Northern Cape Provincial Legislature
- Incumbent
- Assumed office 14 June 2024

Personal details
- Born: Theodorus Ernst Joubert
- Party: Freedom Front Plus (2016–present)
- Other political affiliations: Democratic Alliance (Until 2016)
- Profession: Politician

Theodorus Ernst Joubert is a South African politician who has been a member of the Northern Cape Provincial Legislature since June 2024, representing the Freedom Front Plus.

== Political career ==
Joubert was previously a branch chairperson for the Democratic Alliance before he joined the Freedom Front Plus ahead of the 2016 municipal elections. He stood as a ward councillor candidate for the party.

Joubert was elected to the Northern Cape Provincial Legislature in the 2024 provincial election as the FF Plus retained its single seat. As the governing African National Congress lost its majority in the provincial legislature, the ANC and FF Plus formed an agreement under which Joubert voted for the ANC candidates for office-bearers in exchange for his appointment as chair of the portfolio committee on cooperative governance, human settlements, and traditional affairs.
