= Reinette Liebenberg =

South African politician

Reinette Liebenberg MPL

Member of the Northern Cape Provincial Legislature
- Incumbent
- Assumed office 22 May 2019

Personal details
- Party: Democratic Alliance
- Occupation: Politician

Reinette Liebenberg is a South African politician, who was elected to the Northern Cape Provincial Legislature in the 2019 general election. She is one of eight Democratic Alliance representatives in the provincial legislature. Liebenberg was a councillor of the Sol Plaatje Local Municipality before she was elected to the provincial legislature.

== Political career ==
Liebenberg is a member of the Democratic Alliance. She was re-elected as a councillor of the Sol Plaatje Local Municipality in August 2016. In 2018, Liebenberg criticised the African National Congress for electing Patrick Mabilo as Sol Plaatje mayor.

At the election that was held on 8 May 2019, Liebenberg was elected to the Northern Cape Provincial Legislature. She was sworn in as an MPL on 22 May 2019. She is the DA's spokesperson for agriculture, land reform, rural development and nature conservation.

== Personal life ==
Liebenberg is married to Chris Liebenberg, who is the DA's former provincial leader.
