= Mase Manopole =

South African politician (born 1971)

Mase Manopole MPL

Northern Cape MEC for Social Development, Youth, Women and People Living with Disabilities
- Incumbent
- Assumed office 16 January 2026
- Premier: Zamani Saul
- Preceded by: Nontobeko Vilakazi

Northern Cape MEC for Land Reform, Agriculture and Nature Conservation and Environmental Affairs
- In office 26 June 2020 – 16 January 2026
- Premier: Zamani Saul
- Preceded by: Nomandla Bloem
- Succeeded by: Lebogang Motlhaping

Northern Cape MEC for Health
- In office 29 May 2019 – 26 June 2020
- Premier: Zamani Saul
- Preceded by: Fufe Makatong
- Succeeded by: Maruping Lekwene

Member of the Northern Cape Provincial Legislature
- Incumbent
- Assumed office 10 October 2017

Permanent delegate to the National Council of Provinces
- In office 22 May 2014 – 10 October 2017

Personal details
- Born: Galerekwe Mase Manopole; 13 October 1971 (age 54)
- Party: African National Congress
- Children: 2
- Education: University of the Western Cape
- Profession: Politician

Galerekwe Mase Manopole (born 13 October 1971) is a South African politician who has served as the Northern Cape MEC for Social Development, Youth, Women and People Living with Disabilities since January 2026. She was the MEC for Health from May 2019 to June 2020 and the MEC for Land Reform, Agriculture and Nature Conservation and Environmental Affairs from June 2020 until January 2026. She joined the Northern Cape Provincial Legislature in October 2017. From May 2014 to October 2017, she was a permanent delegate to the National Council of Provinces, representing the Northern Cape. Manopole is a member of the African National Congress.

== Early life and education ==
Manopole was born in 1971 as the fifth of six children. Her mother worked as a teacher, while her father was an entrepreneur. She spent her childhood in Warrenton. After matriculating, she enrolled for a degree in marketing and management at the Central University of Technology. She could not finish the degree, as she had to help out at her father's business. She later fulfilled a higher certificate in economic development at the University of the Western Cape in 2007.

== Politics ==
Manopole served on the provincial leadership of the Young Communist League of South Africa. She was also the provincial treasurer of the National Education, Health and Allied Workers' Union and the chairperson of the provincial Congress of South African Trade Unions branch. After the 2014 general election, she was sworn in as a permanent delegate to the National Council of Provinces, the upper house of the Parliament of South Africa. She was one of six permanent delegates of the Northern Cape.

On 10 October 2017, Manopole was sworn in as a Member of the Northern Cape Provincial Legislature.

== Provincial government ==
Following the general election of 8 May 2019, Zamani Saul was elected premier. He appointed Manopole to the position of Member of the Executive Council for Health on 29 May 2019. She succeeded Fufe Makatong.

On 26 June 2020, Saul appointed Manopole as MEC for Land Reform, Agriculture and Nature Conservation and Environmental Affairs. She took office on the same day and succeeded Nomandla Bloem. Maruping Lekwene succeeded her as MEC for Health.

Following the 2024 provincial election, Manopole remained as MEC for Land Reform, Agriculture and Nature Conservation and Environmental Affairs in the executive council led by Saul. She was appointed the MEC for Social Development, Youth, Women and People Living with Disabilities in January 2026.

== Personal life ==
Manopole married in 1996. She then moved to Kimberley. She divorced in 2007 and has two sons from the marriage.

Political offices
Preceded by Nontobeko Vilakazi	Northern Cape MEC for Social Development, Youth, Women and People Living with Disabilities; 2026–present	Incumbent
Preceded by Nomandla Bloem	Northern Cape MEC for Land Reform, Agriculture and Nature Conservation and Environmental Affairs; 2020–2026	Succeeded by Lebogang Motlhaping
Preceded by Fufe Makatong	Northern Cape MEC for Health; 2019–2020	Succeeded by Maruping Lekwene
