= Alvin Botes =

South African politician (born 1973)

The Honourable Alvin Botes MP
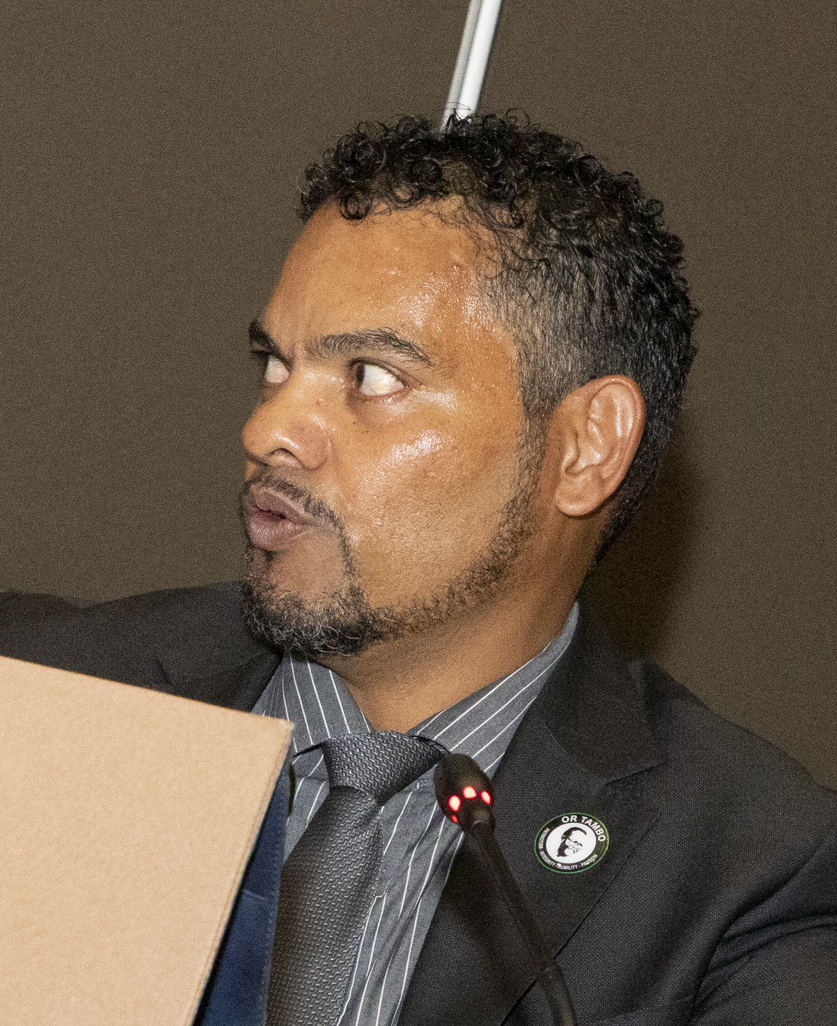
- Botes in March 2022

Deputy Minister of International Relations and Cooperation
- Incumbent
- Assumed office 30 May 2019 Serving with Candith Mashego-Dlamini and Thandi Moraka
- President: Cyril Ramaphosa
- Minister: Naledi Pandor; Ronald Lamola
- Preceded by: Reginah Mhaule; Luwellyn Landers

MEC for Co-operative Governance, Human Settlements and Traditional Affairs
- In office 4 June 2013 – 15 February 2018
- Premier: Sylvia Lucas
- Preceded by: Kenny Mmoiemang
- Succeeded by: Bentley Vass

MEC for Social Development
- In office 11 May 2009 – 5 June 2013
- Premier: Hazel Jenkins
- Succeeded by: Tiny Chotelo

Member of the National Assembly of South Africa
- Incumbent
- Assumed office 27 February 2018

Member of the Northern Cape Provincial Legislature
- In office 6 May 2009 – 15 February 2018

Personal details
- Born: Alvin Botes; 9 September 1973 (age 52)
- Party: African National Congress
- Education: Cape Peninsula University of Technology; University of the Witwatersrand
- Profession: Politician

Alvin Botes (born 9 September 1973) is a South African African National Congress (ANC) politician from the Northern Cape who has been serving as the Deputy Minister of International Relations and Cooperation since May 2019. He became a Member of the National Assembly of South Africa in February 2018.

Botes served as a Member of the Northern Cape Provincial Legislature from 2009 to 2018. He was the Member of the Executive Council (MEC) for Social Development from 2009 to 2013 and the MEC for Co-operative Governance, Human Settlements and Traditional Affairs from 2013 to 2018.

== Early life and education ==
Botes was born on 9 September 1973. He obtained a bachelor's degree in technology in business administration, a post-graduate diploma in public and development management and a national diploma in management from the Cape Peninsula University of Technology. Botes is currently studying towards a master's degree in management from the University of the Witwatersrand.

== Political career ==
He later joined the ANC. Botes worked as the party's provincial head of policy, research and analysis between 1999 and 2009, for a full decade. During the same period, he was involved with the party's youth league. He was first elected provincial treasurer of the youth league, prior to his election as provincial chairperson. From 2003 to 2009, he was a member of the youth league's national executive committee. He was also deputy secretary of the provincial ANC structure from 2008 to 2017.

Botes was elected to the Northern Cape Provincial Legislature in the 2009 election held on 22 April. He took office as a member on 6 May 2009. Premier Hazel Jenkins appointed him MEC for Social Development. In June 2013, he was appointed MEC for Co-operative Governance, Human Settlements and Traditional Affairs by newly elected premier Sylvia Lucas.

Botes was elected to the ANC NEC in December 2017 as one of 80 members. He was sworn in as a Member of the National Assembly in February 2018, after initially refusing to be redeployed.

In May 2019, president Cyril Ramaphosa appointed him Deputy Minister of International Relations and Cooperation. He serves alongside Candith Mashego-Dlamini while Naledi Pandor serves as the department's minister.

Botes stood unsuccessfully for re-election as a member of the ANC NEC at the party's 55th National Conference held in December 2022. Nonetheless, the following month Botes was co-opted onto the ANC NEC in an attempt by the party to increase the representation of minority groups on its highest decision-making body between party conferences.
