= Boitumelo Babuseng =

South African politician

Member of the Northern Cape Provincial Legislature
- In office 21 May 2014 – 30 November 2019

Personal details
- Born: Boitumelo Maxwell Babuseng
- Party: Independent (2019–present)
- Other political affiliations: Democratic Alliance (Until 2019)

Boitumelo Maxwell Babuseng is a South African advocate and retired politician. He is the current chairperson of the National Bar Council of South Africa in the Northern Cape. Babuseng served as a Member of the Northern Cape Provincial Legislature for the Democratic Alliance (DA) from May 2014 until November 2019.

Babuseng retired from politics in October 2019. His last day in the legislature was on 30 November 2019. He has since returned to the Bar.
