= Dipuo Peters =

Former Minister of Transport of the Republic of South Africa

Elizabeth Dipuo Peters
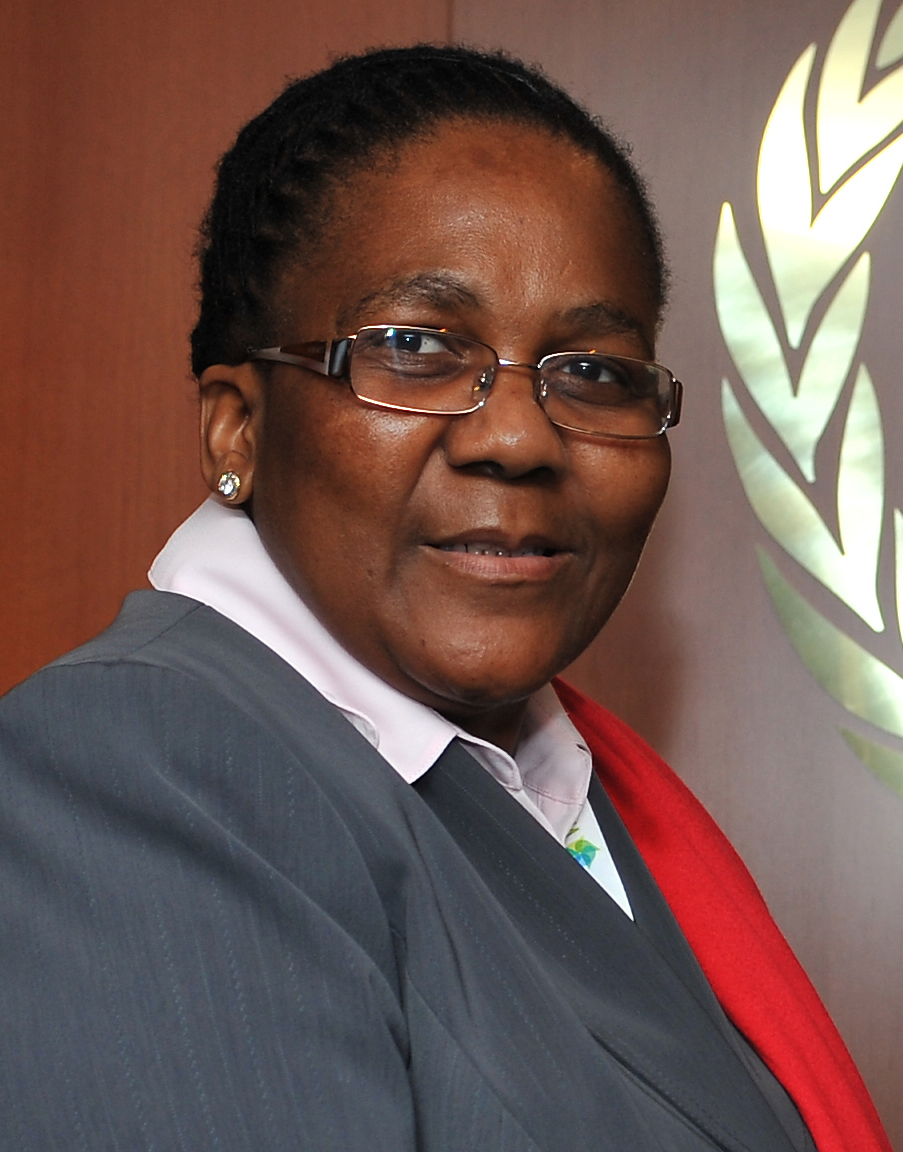

Deputy Minister of Small Business Development
- In office 7 March 2023 – 3 July 2024
- President: Cyril Ramaphosa
- Preceded by: Sidumo Dlamini
- Succeeded by: Jane Sithole

Minister of Transport
- In office 10 July 2013 – 30 March 2017
- President: Jacob Zuma
- Preceded by: Ben Martins
- Succeeded by: Joe Maswanganyi

Minister of Energy
- In office 11 May 2009 – 10 July 2013
- President: Jacob Zuma
- Preceded by: Buyelwa Sonjica
- Succeeded by: Ben Martins

2nd Premier of the Northern Cape
- In office 30 April 2004 – 6 May 2009
- Preceded by: Manne Dipico
- Succeeded by: Hazel Jenkins

Personal details
- Born: Elizabeth Dipuo Peters; 13 May 1960 (age 66) Kimberley, Northern Cape
- Party: African National Congress

Elizabeth Dipuo Peters (born 13 May 1960 in Kimberley, Northern Cape) is a South African politician who is the Deputy Minister of Small Business Development of the Republic of South Africa from 7 March 2023. She was previously the Minister of Transport from 10 July 2013 until 30 March 2017, in the Zuma administration, and former Minister of Energy from 2009 to 2013 having served as successor to Manne Dipico as the second Premier of the Northern Cape Province, 22 April 2004 to 10 May 2009. A member of the African National Congress (ANC), she serves on the Women's League National Executive Committee. Dipuo Peters resigned as a member of parliament for the African National Congress in April 2017.

== Education ==
Peters went to school at Tidimalo Junior Secondary and Tshireleco Senior Secondary in Kimberley. A few years after matriculating, she enrolled for a Bachelor of Arts degree in Social Work at the University of the North (1987). She subsequently studied for a Certificate in Development and Public Policy from the University of the Western Cape (1996); a Certificate in Executive Management from the University of Cape Town Graduate School of Business (2002); and a Certificate in International Policy Management, from Havana, Cuba (2002).

== Political career ==
Dipuo Peters joined the Young Christian Students, where her political activism began. She participated in Youth Formations in the church and community. She was Deputy Chairperson of the Women's Forum in AZASO which later became SASCO at the University of the North. In Kimberley she was a member of the Galeshewe Youth Congress, an affiliate of the United Democratic Front (UDF). She worked as a volunteer regional organiser for the South African Domestic Worker's Union, recruiting, organising, educating and counseling domestic workers in the Northern Cape (1987).

From 1987 to 1990 Peters was Head of the Women's Department at the South African Youth Congress. In 1990 she joined the African National Congress Youth League as the secretary for Women's Affairs, having been Woman Organiser of the National Executive Council (NEC) of the South African Youth Congress (SAYCO), 1987 to 1990. Former Transport Minister Dipuo Peters stated she resigned as an ANC Member of Parliament to focus on her health and her family.

Other positions include:.

- Member of the Northern Cape Provincial National Youth Committee (PNYC) (1990–1991).
- Worked as a social worker for the NCCR, tasks included liaising with other organizations on behalf of the Committee in the Northern Cape, administering grants for the disabled, aged and un-accompanied minors, and proposing and implementing service plans for the individuals and groups of returnees (1992–1994).
- Worked for NCCR, a United Nations High Commission for Refugees (UNHCR) structure which worked for the repatriation of political exiles and re-integration of political prisoners after the unbanning of political organisations.
- Member of Parliament (National Assembly) and was responsible for the Northern Cape and ANC membership/Caucus Register (1994–1997).
- Member of Provincial Executive of the ANC in the Northern Cape (1996).
- Member of the Portfolio Committees on Home Affairs, Public Works, Social Services and Health.
- ANC Chief Whip in the Northern Cape Provincial Legislature (1997–1999).
- ANC's Treasurer for the Northern Cape Province (1997–2003).
- Member of Executive Council (MEC) for Health (1999–2004).
- Provincial Deputy Chairperson of ANC (May - December 2003).
- Member of the ANC Women's League National Executive Committee (2002–2003).
- Deputy Chairperson of the ANC in the Northern Cape, and later acting Provincial Chairperson (2004).
- Member of ANC National Executive Committee (1998–2007).
- Provincial Chairperson of the African National Congress (ANC)(December 2003 - December 2007).

On 5 April 2017, a few days after being dismissed as Minister of Transport, Dipuo Peters resigned as a member of the Parliament of South Africa, citing health reasons and the uncertainty of the past two years as her reasons for leaving politics.

== Controversy and e-tolling in Gauteng ==
Dipuo Peters, in conjunction with other alleged beneficiaries of SANRAL's urban tolling project, has been a vocal supporter of urban tolling to fund the Gauteng Freeway Improvement Project (GFIP). Despite the financial burden already imposed on Gauteng residents due to significant electricity tariff hikes, load-shedding, the national fuel levy, and income tax hikes, the minister has unveiled plans to classify the non-payment of toll levies as an AARTO infringement.

Political offices
| Preceded by Manne Dipico | Premier of the Northern Cape; 11 May 1998 – 6 May 2009 | Succeeded by Hazel Jenkins |
| Preceded by Buyelwa Sonjica as Minister of Minerals and Energy | Minister of Energy; 2009 – present | Succeeded by Ben Martins |
