= Bentley Vass =

South African politician (born 1972)

Bentley Vass MPL

Northern Cape MEC for Roads and Public Works
- Incumbent
- Assumed office 14 August 2026
- Premier: Zamani Saul
- Preceded by: Fufe Makatong

Northern Cape MEC for Cooperative Governance, Human Settlements, Traditional Affairs (Transport, Safety and Liaison: 2024–2025)
- In office 28 June 2024 – 14 August 2026
- Premier: Zamani Saul
- Preceded by: New portfolio
- Succeeded by: Lebogang Motlhaping

Northern Cape MEC for Co-operative Governance, Human Settlements and Traditional Affairs
- In office 15 February 2018 – 14 June 2024
- Premier: Zamani Saul; Sylvia Lucas
- Preceded by: Alvin Botes
- Succeeded by: Himself

Deputy Provincial Chairperson of the African National Congress in the Northern Cape
- Incumbent
- Assumed office 2017
- Preceded by: Kenny Mmoiemang

Member of the Northern Cape Provincial Legislature
- Incumbent
- Assumed office 3 October 2017

Personal details
- Born: 26 December 1972 (age 53)
- Party: African National Congress
- Occupation: Politician

Bentley Gavin Vass (born 26 December 1972) is a South African politician. He has been a member of the Executive Council (MEC) of the Northern Cape for the Roads and Public Works portfolio since August 2026. He was previously the MEC for Co-operative Governance, Human Settlements and Traditional Affairs from February 2018 until June 2024 and led the Department of Transport, Safety and Liaison as part of the COGHSTA portfolio from 2024 until 2025, before serving as the MEC for only the Cooperative Governance, Human Settlements, Traditional Affairs portfolio from 2025 until 2026. He was sworn in as a Member of the Northern Cape Provincial Legislature in October 2017. Vass is a member of the African National Congress and the party's deputy provincial chairperson.

== Politics ==
Vass is a member of the African National Congress. He was elected the party's deputy provincial chairperson in May 2017, succeeding Kenny Mmoiemang who stood down. Vass was also speaker and executive mayor of the Namakwa District Municipality.

== Provincial government ==
On 3 October 2017, Vass was sworn in as a Member of the Northern Cape Provincial Legislature. He filled the seat left vacant by the resignation of Dawid Rooi. Premier Sylvia Lucas appointed him as the Member of the Executive Council for Co-operative Governance, Human Settlements and Traditional Affairs on 15 February 2018. Vass succeeded Alvin Botes, who resigned from the provincial government to become a Member of the National Assembly. Following the 2019 general election, Zamani Saul was elected as the new premier. On 28 May 2019, he announced that Vass would remain in his position.

Vass was appointed to lead the amalgamated ministry of Cooperative Governance, Human Settlements, Traditional Affairs, Transport, Safety and Liaison following the 2024 provincial election. In January 2025, Saul recreated the portfolio of MEC for Transport, Safety and Liaison and then appointed Limakatso Koloi to lead it, while keeping Vass in his position. Vass was moved to the Roads and Public Works portfolio of the executive council during a reshuffle in August 2026.

Political offices
Preceded by Fufe Makatong	Northern Cape MEC for Roads and Public Works; 2026–present	Incumbent
Preceded by new portfolio	Northern Cape MEC for Cooperative Governance, Human Settlements and Traditional Affairs (Transport, Safety and Liaison: 2024–2025); 2024–2026	Succeeded by Lebogang Motlhaping
Preceded by Alvin Botes	Northern Cape MEC for Co-operative Governance, Human Settlements and Traditional Affairs; 2018–2024	Succeeded by Himself
