= Isak Fritz =

South African politician

Isak Fritz MPL

Leader of the Official Opposition in the Northern Cape Provincial Legislature
- Incumbent
- Assumed office December 2025
- Premier: Zamani Saul
- Preceded by: Harold McGluwa

Leader of the Democratic Alliance in the Northern Cape
- Incumbent
- Assumed office 6 December 2025
- Preceded by: Harold McGluwa

Member of the Northern Cape Provincial Legislature
- Incumbent
- Assumed office 21 May 2014

Personal details
- Born: Isak Cornelius Christiaan Fritz
- Party: Democratic Alliance
- Occupation: Member of the Provincial Legislature
- Profession: Politician

Isak Cornelius Christiaan Fritz is a South African politician who has served as the Leader of the Official Opposition in the Northern Cape Provincial Legislature and as the Leader of the Democratic Alliance in the Northern Cape since December 2025. He has been a Member of the Northern Cape Provincial Legislature since 2014.

== Political career ==
Fritz is a member of the Democratic Alliance. He was elected as a Member of the Northern Cape Provincial Legislature in the 7 May 2014 provincial election, as he was placed seventh on the party's provincial list and the party won seven seats. He was sworn in as an MPL on 21 May 2014.

Fritz was re-elected for a second term in the 8 May 2019 provincial election, as he was once again seventh and the party won eight seats. He took office for his new term on 22 May 2019.

In 2020, he declared that he was a candidate to replace Harold McGluwa as provincial chairperson of the DA. The provincial congress was held on 5 December 2020 and Fritz won the election as McGluwa was elected provincial election. He

Fritz was re-elected unopposed as the DA's provincial chairperson at the party's provincial conference on 10 June 2023.

On 23 August 2023, Fritz was announced as the DA's candidate for Northern Cape Premier in the 2024 general election. The ruling ANC lost their majority in the provincial legislature in the election. During the first sitting of the legislature on 14 June 2024, the DA nominated Fritz during the election for premier. He lost to incumbent Zamani Saul of the ANC, receiving 11 votes to Saul's 19.

Fritz was elected as the provincial leader of the Democratic Alliance in the Northern Cape on 6 December 2025.
