= Priscilla Isaacs =

South African politician

Priscilla Isaacs MPL

Member of the Northern Cape Provincial Legislature
- Incumbent
- Assumed office 22 May 2019

Personal details
- Party: Democratic Alliance
- Occupation: Politician

Priscilla Serina Johanna Isaacs is a South African politician serving as a Member of the Northern Cape Provincial Legislature for the Democratic Alliance (DA). She took office as a Member on 22 May 2019. Isaacs was a PR councillor of the Dawid Kruiper Local Municipality, prior to her election to the provincial legislature.

In 2020, Isaacs declared her candidacy for DA deputy provincial chairperson. The provincial congress was held on 5 December 2020, and she was elected.
