= Pule Thole =

South African politician

Member of the Northern Cape Provincial Legislature
- In office 21 May 2014 – 15 March 2016
- Succeeded by: Melinda Hattingh

Personal details
- Born: Pule Isaac Thole
- Party: Democratic Alliance (Until 2016)
- Profession: Advocate

Pule Isaac Thole is a South African advocate and former SAPS brigadier who served as a Member of the Northern Cape Provincial Legislature for the Democratic Alliance from 2014 to 2016.

== Biography ==
Thole served as a brigadier in the South African Police Service until his election to the Northern Cape Provincial Legislature in May 2014. He was one of seven Democratic Alliance members. Thole was the party's spokesperson on transport, safety and liaison.

In January 2016, Thole announced his resignation from the DA. His resignation came into effect in mid-March. The DA appointed Melinda Hattingh to fill his seat in the legislature.
