= David Dichaba =

South African politician

Member of the Northern Cape Provincial Legislature
- In office 22 May 2019 – 6 October 2022

Personal details
- Born: David Lesole Dichaba
- Party: African National Congress

David Lesole Dichaba is a South African politician who served as a Member of the Northern Cape Provincial Legislature. He took office as an MPL on 22 May 2019. He was the Chairperson of both the Portfolio Committee on Education, Sport, Arts & Culture and the Standing Committee on Constitutional Affairs, Petitions and Public Participation. Dichaba is a member of the ruling African National Congress (ANC).

Dichaba resigned from the provincial legislature on 6 October 2022.
