= Premier (South Africa) =

Head of government of a South African province

A premier in South Africa's provinces is the head of the provincial government. This position mirrors the president's role at the national level, functioning as the chief executive and leading the province's executive council. Premiers are chosen by members of the provincial legislature, typically from the dominant political party. Similar to the President and national cabinet, the Premier appoints Members of the Executive Council (MECs) to oversee various provincial departments.

== Background ==
The concept of Premiers in South Africa is directly linked to the establishment of the country's current nine-province system in 1994. This marked a dramatic shift from the previous apartheid era:

Prior to 1994, South Africa consisted of four provinces governed by administrators appointed by the central government. These provinces were established during the formation of the Union of South Africa in 1910.

The dismantling of apartheid and the first multi-racial elections in 1994 led to a significant restructuring of the government.

A key aspect of this change was the creation of nine provinces, incorporating the former "homelands" (Bantustans) into a unified South Africa. These "homelands" were territories designated for specific racial groups under apartheid. Their inclusion aimed to dismantle the spatial segregation enforced by the apartheid government.

To ensure democratic representation at this new provincial level, the position of Premier was created. Premiers became the elected leaders responsible for heading their respective provincial governments.

=== Relations between premiers and other levels of government ===
South Africa's three-tier system of government – national, provincial, and local – necessitates a complex web of relationships to ensure smooth operation. Premiers, as heads of provincial governments, play a crucial role in intergovernmental relations.

==== Cooperative governance ====
The South African Constitution emphasizes cooperative governance as a core principle. This means all spheres of government – national, provincial, and local – have a legal obligation to work together for the collective good of the country.

Premiers play a vital role in fostering this cooperation within their provinces. They convene Premier's Inter-governmental Forums (PIFs), bringing together local government representatives (mayors) and provincial-level officials (MECs).

PIFs serve as platforms for:

- Discussing and coordinating broad provincial development plans.
- Aligning provincial and local government strategies.
- Addressing issues of common interest.

==== National-provincial relations ====
The national government sets the overall policy framework for the country. However, provinces have some legislative and executive autonomy.

Premiers maintain regular communication with the President and national ministers (through bodies like the Ministerial and Member of the Executive Council Meetings – MINMECs).

This allows for:

- Negotiation and consultation on national policies that impact the provinces.
- Sharing best practices and expertise between national and provincial levels.
- Joint problem-solving for national issues with provincial dimensions (e.g., infrastructure development).

==== Challenges and tensions ====
Despite the emphasis on cooperation, tensions can arise between levels of government.

These might involve:

- Disputes over national funding allocations to provinces.
- Disagreements on policy implementation at the provincial level.
- Competition for resources and political influence.

==== Mechanisms for addressing tensions ====
South Africa has established various mechanisms to address intergovernmental disputes.

These include:

- Intergovernmental Relations Act: This act provides a framework for cooperation and conflict resolution between government spheres.
- Dispute Resolution Mechanisms: These mechanisms, often involving mediation or litigation, aim to reach solutions when disagreements occur.

== Role ==
In terms of the Constitution of the Republic of South Africa, the executive authority of a province is vested in the Premier. The Premier appoints an Executive Council made up of five to ten members of the provincial legislature; they are known as Members of the Executive Council (MECs). The MECs are effectively ministers and the Executive Council a cabinet at the provincial level. The Premier has the power to hire and fire MECs at their own discretion. The Western Cape is the only province where MECs are known as Provincial Ministers and the Executive Council is known as the Provincial Cabinet, in terms of Section 42 of the Constitution of the Western Cape, 1997.

The Premier and the Executive Council are responsible for implementing provincial legislation, along with any national legislation assigned to the provinces. They set provincial policy and manage the departments of the provincial government; their actions are subject to the national constitution and the provincial constitution (if there is one).

In order for an act of the provincial legislature to become law, the Premier must sign it. If the Premier believes that the act is unconstitutional, it can be referred back to the legislature for reconsideration. If the Premier and the legislature cannot agree, the act must be referred to the Constitutional Court for a final decision.

The Premier is also ex officio a member of the National Council of Provinces, the upper house of Parliament, as one of the special delegates from their province.

== Election ==
Elections for the nine provincial legislatures are held every five years, simultaneously with the election of the National Assembly; the last such election occurred on 29 May 2024. At the first meeting of the provincial legislature after an election, the members choose the Premier from amongst themselves. The legislature can force the Premier to resign by a motion of no confidence. If the Premiership becomes vacant (for whatever reason) the legislature must choose a new Premier to serve out the period until the next election. Like the President, the Premier is only allowed two maximum terms in office and is barred for life from running for a third term.

== List of current premiers ==
Province	Title	Portrait	Name	Order	Party	Incumbency	First mandate began	Current mandate began
Eastern Cape	Premier		Oscar Mabuyane	7th	ANC	7 years, 141 days (22 May 2019)	2019 election	2024 election
Free State	Premier		Maqueen Letsoha-Mathae	8th	ANC	2 years, 118 days (14 June 2024)	2024 election	2024 election
Gauteng	Premier		Panyaza Lesufi	7th	ANC	4 years, 4 days (6 October 2022)	6 October 2022 2022 designation	6 October 2022 2022 designation
KwaZulu-Natal	Premier		Thami Ntuli	8th	IFP	2 years, 118 days (14 June 2024)	2024 election	2024 election
Limpopo	Premier		Phophi Ramathuba	6th	ANC	2 years, 118 days (14 June 2024)	2024 election	2024 election
Mpumalanga	Premier		Mandla Ndlovu	6th	ANC	2 years, 118 days (14 June 2024)	2024 election	2024 election
North West	Premier		Lazarus Mokgosi	7th	ANC	2 years, 118 days (14 June 2024)	2024 election	2024 election
Northern Cape	Premier		Zamani Saul	5th	ANC	7 years, 141 days (22 May 2019)	2019 election	2024 election
Western Cape	Premier		Alan Winde	8th	DA	7 years, 141 days (22 May 2019)	2019 election	2024 election

== See also ==
- Premier
- Politics of South Africa
- Provinces of South Africa
