= Harold McGluwa =

South African politician

Harold McGluwa MPL

Leader of the Democratic Alliance in the Northern Cape
- In office 5 December 2020 – 6 December 2025
- Preceded by: Andrew Louw
- Succeeded by: Isak Fritz

Member of the Northern Cape Provincial Legislature
- Incumbent
- Assumed office September 2012

Personal details
- Party: Democratic Alliance
- Occupation: Politician

Harold McGluwa is a South African politician serving as a Member of the Northern Cape Provincial Legislature since 2012. A member of the Democratic Alliance (DA), he has served as the party's provincial leader in the Northern Cape from 2020 until 2025. He was the DA's provincial chairperson from 2012 to 2020. He is also the party's chief whip in the legislature. McGluwa was the provincial head of the previous Independent Democrats (ID).

McGluwa's brother, Joe McGluwa, serves as a Member of Parliament for the DA and was also the party's provincial leader in the North West.

In 2020, McGluwa announced that he was a candidate for provincial leader of the DA. The provincial congress was held on 5 December 2020. McGluwa won the election, defeating Willie Aucamp and Fawzia Rhoda.

On 30 November 2021, McGluwa was elected as the new DA caucus leader in the provincial legislature.

On 6 December 2025, McGluwa stood down as DA provincial leader; Isak Fritz was elected to succeed him.
