= Maruping Lekwene =

South African politician (born 1969)

Maruping Lekwene MPL

Northern Cape MEC for Health
- In office 26 June 2020 – 5 November 2025
- Premier: Zamani Saul
- Preceded by: Mase Manopole
- Succeeded by: Nontobeko Vilakazi

Northern Cape MEC for Finance, Economic Development and Tourism
- In office 29 May 2019 – 26 June 2020
- Premier: Zamani Saul
- Preceded by: Mac Jack
- Succeeded by: Abraham Vosloo

Member of the Northern Cape Provincial Legislature
- Incumbent
- Assumed office June 2014

Personal details
- Born: Maruping Matthews Lekwene; 14 September 1969 (age 56)
- Party: African National Congress; South African Communist Party
- Occupation: Politician

Maruping Matthews Lekwene (born 14 September 1969) is a South African politician who served as the Northern Cape MEC for Health from June 2020 until November 2025. He has been a Member of the Northern Cape Provincial Legislature for the African National Congress from June 2014 until November 2025. He was the MEC for Finance, Economic Development and Tourism from May 2019 until June 2020. Lekwene is also the provincial chairperson of the South African Communist Party (SACP) and the ANC's deputy provincial secretary.

== Criticism ==
In December 2019, Lekwene announced that the trading hours of liquor stores in the Sol Plaatje Local Municipality would be extended during the ANC's 108th birthday celebrations from 8 to 11 January 2020. Under this notice, licensed liquor stores could trade for 24-hours during the period of the extension. The African National Congress Women's League (ANCWL) criticised this notice and called for it to be revoked. Lekwene later reversed the decision.

Political offices
| Preceded by Mase Manopole | Northern Cape MEC for Health; 2020–2025 | Succeeded by Nontobeko Vilakazi |
| Preceded by Mac Jack | Northern Cape MEC for Finance, Economic Development and Tourism; 2019–2020 | Succeeded by Abraham Vosloo |
