= Mangaliso Matika =

South African politician

Mangaliso Matika MPL

Member of the Northern Cape Executive Council for Sport, Arts and Culture
- Incumbent
- Assumed office 21 January 2025
- Premier: Zamani Saul
- Preceded by: Position recreated

Deputy Speaker of the Northern Cape Provincial Legislature
- In office 22 May 2019 – 21 January 2025
- Preceded by: Juanita Beukes
- Succeeded by: Sharifa Ferris

Member of the Northern Cape Provincial Legislature
- Incumbent
- Assumed office 12 October 2018

Personal details
- Party: African National Congress
- Occupation: Politician

Octavious Mangaliso Matika is a South African politician who has been the Northern Cape's Member of the Executive Council (MEC) for Sports, Arts and Culture since January 2025. He previously served as the Deputy Speaker of the Northern Cape Provincial Legislature from May 2019 until January 2025. He took office as an MPL in October 2018. He was previously the Executive Mayor of the Sol Plaatje Local Municipality. Matika is a member of the African National Congress (ANC).
