= Limakatso Koloi =

South African politician

Limakatso Koloi MPL

Member of the Northern Cape Executive Council for Transport, Safety, and Liaison
- Incumbent
- Assumed office 21 January 2025
- Preceded by: Position recreated

Member of the Northern Cape Provincial Legislature
- Incumbent
- Assumed office 22 May 2019

Personal details
- Born: Limakatso Alfonsina Koloi
- Party: African National Congress

Limakatso Alfonsina Koloi is a South African politician. She is a member of the African National Congress and is currently a Northern Cape Provincial Legislature member. She took office as an MPL on 22 May 2019. She served as the Deputy Chair of Chairs and the Chairperson of the Portfolio Committee on Co-operative Governance, Human Settlements, and Traditional Affairs. Koloi was previously the Executive Mayor of the Dawid Kruiper Local Municipality.

In January 2025, Koloi joined the provincial government as the Member of the Executive Council for Transport, Safety, and Liaison.
