= Premier of the Northern Cape =

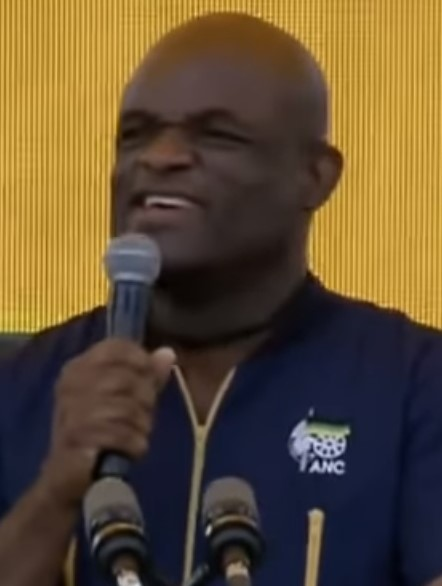
- Incumbent; Zamani Saul since 22 May 2019
- Style: The Honourable
- Appointer: Northern Cape Provincial Legislature
- Term length: Five years, renewable once
- Inaugural holder: Manne Dipico
- Formation: 7 May 1994
- Website: Official website

The premier of the Northern Cape is the head of government of the Northern Cape province of South Africa. The current premier of the Northern Cape is Zamani Saul, a member of the African National Congress, who was elected in the 2019 election. He took office on 22 May 2019.

== Functions ==
In terms of the constitution, the executive authority of a province is vested in the premier. The premier appoints an Executive Council made up of nine members of the provincial legislature; they are called members of the Executive Council (MECs). The MECs are effectively ministers and the Executive Council a cabinet at the provincial level. The premier has the ability to appoint and axe MECs at his/her own discretion.

The premier and the Executive Council are responsible for executing provincial legislation, along with any national legislation allocated to the province. They set provincial policy and administer the departments of the provincial government; their actions are subject to the national constitution.

In order for an act of the provincial legislature to become law, the premier must sign the legislation. The premier can refer legislation back to the legislature for reconsideration if the premier believes the act is unconstitutional. If the premier and the legislature cannot agree, the act must be referred to the Constitutional Court for a final decision.

The premier is also ex officio a member of the National Council of Provinces, the upper house of Parliament, as one of the special delegates from the province.

== List of premiers of the Northern Cape ==
No.	Portrait	Name (Birth–Death)	Term of office			Political party
No.	Portrait	Name (Birth–Death)	Took office	Left office	Time in office	Political party
1		Manne Dipico (born 1959)	7 May 1994	30 April 2004	9 years, 359 days	African National Congress
2		Elizabeth Dipuo Peters (born 1960)	30 April 2004	6 May 2009	5 years, 6 days	African National Congress
3		Hazel Jenkins (born 1960)	6 May 2009	22 May 2013	4 years, 16 days	African National Congress
-		Grizelda Cjiekella (acting) (1970–2015)	26 February 2012	2 April 2013	1 year, 35 days	African National Congress
4		Sylvia Lucas (acting until 23 May) (born 1964)	2 April 2013	22 May 2019	6 years, 50 days	African National Congress
5		Zamani Saul (born 1972)	22 May 2019	Incumbent	7 years, 108 days	African National Congress

== Election ==
The election for the Northern Cape Provincial Legislature is held every five years, simultaneously with the election of the National Assembly; the last such election occurred on 29 May 2024. At the first meeting of the provincial legislature after an election, the members choose the premier from amongst themselves. The provincial legislature can force the premier to resign by passing a motion of no confidence. If the premiership becomes vacant (for whatever reason) the provincial legislature must elect a new premier to serve out the period until the next election. One person cannot have served more than two five-year terms as premier; however, when a premier is selected to fill a vacancy the time until the next election does not count as a term.

== See also ==
- Politics of the Northern Cape
- Premier (South Africa)
- President of South Africa
- Politics of South Africa
