= Hazel Jenkins =

South African politician

3rd Premier of the Northern Cape
- In office 6 May 2009 – 22 May 2013
- Preceded by: Dipuo Peters
- Succeeded by: Sylvia Lucas

Personal details
- Party: African National Congress

Hazel Gertrude Jenkins is a South African politician and former premier of the Northern Cape province. She served as premier from May 2009 until she officially stood down in April 2013, following a stroke. The motion to recognise her stepping down as premier (on medical grounds) was defeated in a vote by the legislature on 30 April 2013 so that technically Jenkins remained premier. Hence Sylvia Lucas was sworn in on 30 April not as Jenkins' successor but as acting premier. Jenkins subsequently resigned, as of 22 May 2013, paving the way for Lucas to be sworn in as her successoron 23 May 2013.

== Background and political career ==
Aged 49 at the time that she assumed office as premier, Jenkins had been the mayor of the Pixley ka Seme (formerly Bo Karoo) District Municipality, at De Aar in the Karoo. Previously she was a teacher.

Born on 6 June 1960 in Ceres in the Western Cape, she was educated in Worcester, matriculating from the Esselen Park High School. She graduated with a teaching diploma from the Bellville Training College, with her first posting as a teacher at Rocklands High School in Mitchell's Plain, Cape Town. Jenkins was a Youth Councillor in the Anglican Church.

In 1995 Jenkins was elected as a Councillor in De Aar's Emthanjeni Local Municipality, going on to serve as Executive Mayor for the Bo-Karoo District Municipality. She served two terms as the deputy chairperson of the South African Local Government Association.

== Premier of the Northern Cape ==
In 2009, following the landslide victory of the ruling African National Congress in the general election, Jenkins was announced as the party's nominee for Premier of the Northern Cape, in succession to Dipuo Peters. The announcement drew criticism from the provincial ANC branch, however, which was annoyed at the sidelining of its chairperson John Block. Jenkins said at the time: "We will work as a united force. Contrary to what some might say about the premier being a puppet on a string, we will work as a collective..." Block pledged his support, adding "I still remain the political head of the Province and together with the PEC (Provincial Executive Council) will assist and guide Jenkins and the rest of the Executive Council."

Her Premiership became effective on 6 May 2009.

=== Appointment of acting premiers ===
Jenkins collapsed, suffering a stroke, while delivering her 2012 State of the Province Address in Kimberley on 17 February 2012, and was admitted to the intensive care unit at Kimberley Hospital. The Executive Council of the Province met on 20 February, unanimously resolving to appoint the MEC for Education, Ms Grizelda Cjiekella, as acting premier for the duration of Premier Hazel Jenkins’ incapacity leave.

Premier Jenkins, following a lengthy hospital stay, made a surprise first public appearance at the Northern Cape ANC elective conference in Upington on 7 June 2012. "She appeared healthy," reported the media, "singing and dancing along with President Jacob Zuma and other members of the party’s upper echelons."

On April 2, 2013, Hazel Jenkins officially stepped down from the post of Premier of the Northern Cape and was to be succeeded by Sylvia Lucas, the Provincial Minister for Environmental Affairs. However the motion to recognize Jenkins' stepping down was opposed on procedural grounds. A vote in the Northern Cape legislature on 30 April 2013, in which opposition parties COPE and the Democratic Alliance took part, failed to achieve the required two thirds support for the motion to be carried. Accordingly, Jenkins technically remained premier and Lucas was sworn in on the same day as Grizelda Cjiekella's successor as acting premier of the province.

Jenkins resigned as premier with effect from 22 May 2013, paving the way of Lucas to be sworn in as her successor.

== Political speeches ==
- Inaugural Address, Provincial Legislature, Northern Cape, 11 May 2009
- Reply to the debate following her Inaugural Address, Provincial Legislature, Northern Cape, 19 May 2009
- State of the Province Address, Provincial Legislature, Northern Cape, 12 June 2009
- State of the Province Address, Provincial Legislature, Northern Cape, 18 February 2010
- State of the Province Address, Provincial Legislature, Northern Cape, 18 February 2011
- It was while delivering her 2012 State of the Province Address in Kimberley on 17 February 2012 that Premier Hazel Jenkins collapsed, suffering a stroke.

== Notes ==
- South African Press Association (SAPA). " Zuma: 'Those not put in govt must not cry'." Mail & Guardian. 4 May 2009. (accessed May 4, 2009).

Political offices
| Preceded by Dipuo Peters | Premier of the Northern Cape; 6 May 2009 – 2 April 2013 (motion to recognise her stepping down not carried in vote, 30 April 2013; resignation effective 22 May 2013) | Succeeded by Sylvia Lucas |
