= Sylvia Lucas =

South African politician (born 1964)

The Honourable Sylvia Lucas MP
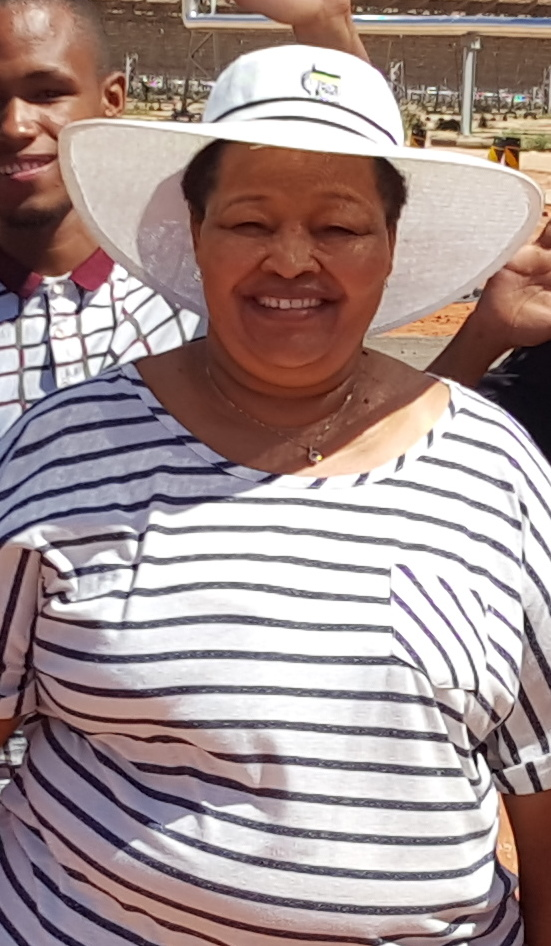
- Lucas in 2016

Chairperson of the Joint Standing Committee on Intelligence
- Incumbent
- Assumed office 1 April 2025
- Preceded by: Jerome Maake

Deputy Chairperson of the National Council of Provinces
- In office 23 May 2019 – 28 May 2024
- Chairperson: Amos Masondo
- Preceded by: Raseriti Tau
- Succeeded by: Les Govender

4th Premier of the Northern Cape
- In office 23 May 2013 – 22 May 2019
- Preceded by: Hazel Jenkins
- Succeeded by: Zamani Saul

Personal details
- Born: 22 April 1964 (age 62) Upington, Cape Province; South Africa
- Party: African National Congress
- Occupation: Politician

Sylvia Elizabeth Lucas (born 22 April 1964), also known as Sylvia Elizabeth Izaks, is a South African politician who represents the African National Congress (ANC) in the National Assembly of South Africa. She was the fourth Premier of the Northern Cape between May 2013 and May 2019.

Lucas began her career as a community development worker, activist, and local councillor in Upington. She joined the Northern Cape Provincial Legislature in 2000 and served in the Northern Cape Executive Council as Member of the Executive Council (MEC) for Environment and Nature Conservation between May 2009 and May 2013. The ANC nominated her to serve as the province's premier in May 2013 after Hazel Jenkins resigned because of a prolonged illness. Though she was re-elected to the premiership in the May 2014 general election, Lucas failed to win the provincial leadership of the ANC in a prominent contest in 2017.

After the 2019 general election, Lucas was the Deputy Chairperson of the National Council of Provinces during the Sixth Parliament from May 2019 to May 2024. She also served a five-year term as a member of the ANC's National Executive Committee. In the 2024 general election, she moved to the lower parliamentary house, the National Assembly, where she was appointed as chairperson of the Joint Standing Committee on Intelligence.

== Early life and career ==
Lucas was born on 22 April 1964 and grew up in Upington in the Northern Cape, then part of the Cape Province. Her mother died when she was twelve years old, and she was raised by her grandparents. She attended Upington's Carlton van Heerden High School, where she became politically active in the early 1980s in the anti-apartheid movement.

After leaving high school, she worked as a typist for the governing National Party and as a government employee in the Department of Social Development. She was also a community activist in Upington; she was a leader in the rent boycotts in Rosedale and helped found the community radio station, Radio Riverside.

In 1992, during the negotiations to end apartheid, Lucas joined the African National Congress (ANC). The following year she was elected as chairperson of the Rosedale branch of the ANC Women's League. The ANC included her in community delegations to the Transitional Executive Council and, after the first democratic elections in 1994, she was nominated to represent the party as a proportional-representation councillor in the Khara Hais Local Municipality. She was elected and served throughout the council's first session from 1995 to 1999.

While serving as a councillor, Lucas gained greater seniority in the local ANC, joining the ANC's Regional Executive Committee in 1996 and becoming regional chairperson of the ANC Women's League in 1998. In 2000, she was elected to the Provincial Executive Committee and Provincial Working Committee of the ANC Women's League in the Northern Cape and elected as the chairperson—and first woman chairperson—of the mainstream ANC's Siyanda regional branch, which included Upington. She also retained her job at the Department of Social Development until 1999, when she undertook a new position as a community development worker in the Khara Hais Local Municipality; she was also a shop steward for the South African Municipal Workers' Union. She left her civil service job in 2000 upon her election to the legislature.

== Northern Cape Legislature: 2000–2013 ==
In 2000, Lucas joined the Northern Cape Provincial Legislature as a representative of the ANC. She was re-elected to full terms in her seat in the general elections of April 2004 and April 2009. In the interim, she rose through the ranks of the provincial ANC; she gained election to the party's Provincial Executive Committee for the first time in 2004 and was elected as deputy provincial chairperson of the ANC Women's League in 2008.

Having served as an ANC whip in the provincial legislature between 2004 and 2009, Lucas was promoted to an executive position in the Northern Cape government after the 2009 election; announcing her Executive Council on 11 May 2009, newly elected premier Hazel Jenkins appointed Lucas as Member of the Executive Council (MEC) for Environment and Nature Conservation. She remained in this role during Grizelda Cjiekella's prolonged stint as acting premier after Jenkins suffered a stroke in 2012.

== Premier of the Northern Cape: 2013–2019 ==
At the beginning of April 2013, the ANC announced that Jenkins would formally step down as Premier of the Northern Cape, due to prolonged medical incapacity, and that the ANC's majority caucus in the provincial legislature would elect Lucas as her permanent replacement. Lucas told the press that, "As a disciplined cadre, I am willing to take up any position within the ANC." The Mail & Guardian reported that some quarters of the ANC opposed Lucas's appointment, preferring acting premier Cjiekella to continue in the office, and that Lucas's parents' house in Upington was attacked with a petrol bomb in the week after the ANC's announcement. The opposition Democratic Alliance welcomed the announcement, saying that Lucas "is not in the pockets of some of the big guns" and thus "will be able to execute her mandate without fear or favour."

While the ANC had initially said that Lucas would take up her new office in the first week of April, her ascension was delayed: instead of having Jenkins resign from the premiership, as initially announced, the ANC caucus sought to remove Jenkins through a motion in the provincial legislature, but it failed to garner the requisite supermajority to carry the motion. Thus Jenkins remained in place as premier and instead, on 30 April 2013, Lucas was sworn in as acting premier, replacing Cjiekella. Finally, Jenkins formally resigned on 22 May, and Lucas was formally elected and sworn in as Premier of the Northern Cape on 23 May. She was inaugurated, and delivered her inaugural speech as premier, on 30 May.

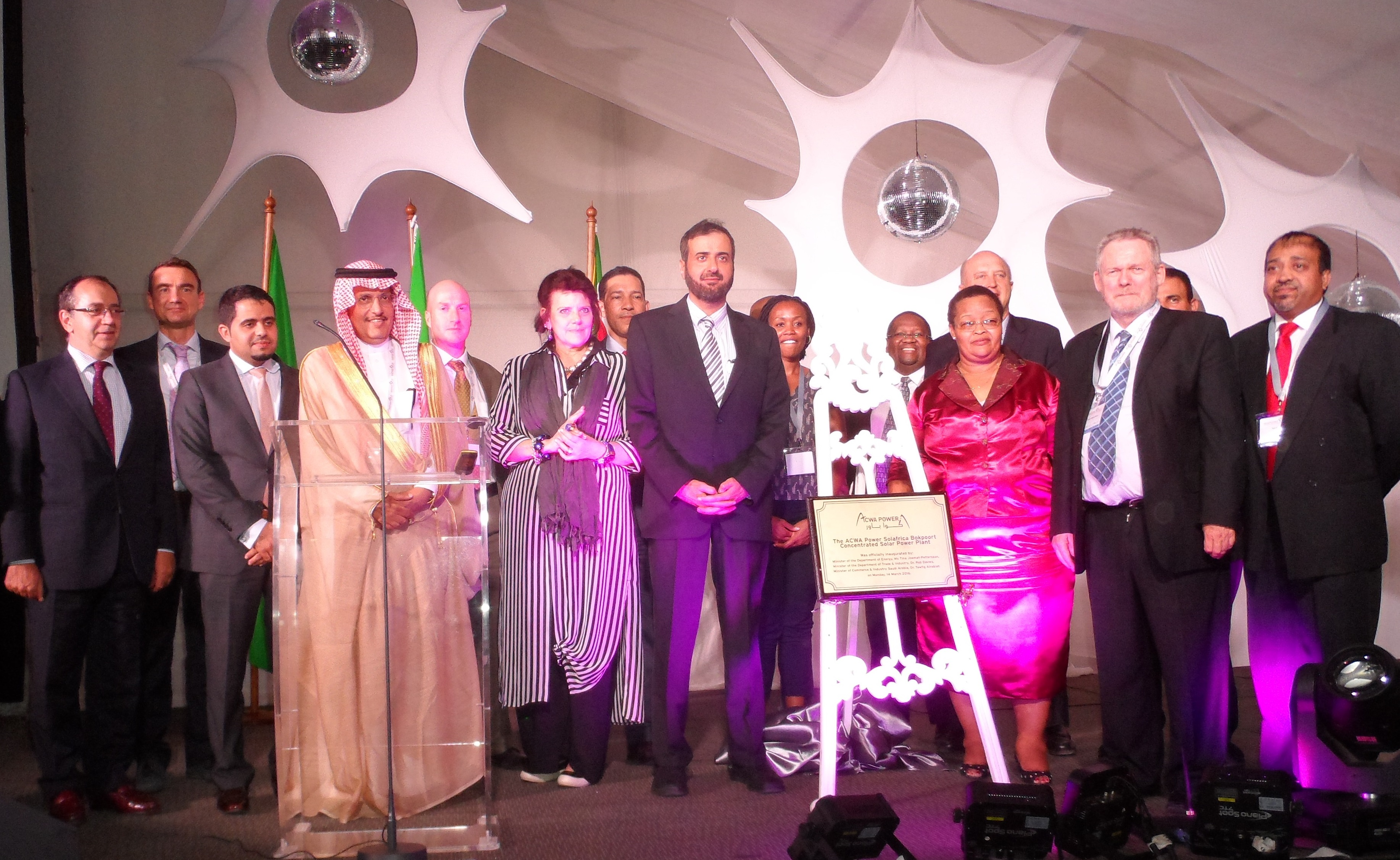
Lucas (centre, in pink) at the launch of the Bokpoort Concentrated Solar Power Plant in March 2016

The ANC spokesperson, Gail Parker, said that Lucas's premiership would last only until the next general election, scheduled for a year later, unless the provincial party resolved to re-elect her. The party supported her re-election in the May 2014 general election, and she was duly re-elected to a full term in the premiership on 20 May 2014. That year, she was the only woman elected as a premier in any of the eight ANC-run provinces. Her early policy initiatives included a drive to attract investments in renewable energy in the Northern Cape and the launch of a government-subsidised intra-provincial airline service.

=== "Fast Food Premier" ===
In September 2013, the Sunday Times published an exposé that alleged that Lucas had used her official credit card to spend over R53,000 ($3,500) on personal groceries and fast food during her brief tenure in office to date, including R26,500 on food in a single month. The media nicknamed her the "Fast Food Premier", and health activists additionally criticized her for undermining ongoing public education campaigns on healthy eating.

Lucas denied any impropriety; the Times quoted her as responding, "How would we have eaten if we didn't use taxpayers' money?" Her spokesman told the media that her spending had not contravened any laws and had been "totally blown out of proportion": the amounts were "not excessive" and "she hasn't spent money on alcohol or clothes." The ANC's provincial legislative caucus, through the office of its chief whip, defended Lucas in a statement that also criticized the media for "relying on racist and sexist tropes and innuendo that disfigures black people in general and black women more specifically", including through implicit or explicit references to Lucas's body type and apparent penchant for fried chicken.

=== Hate speech conviction ===
While serving as premier, Lucas appeared in the Equality Court on charges of hate speech. She was accused of using a racial slur during a speech at an ANC event in September 2010, while she was still serving as MEC; using a derogatory term for the Khoisan, she had joked that, "Hotnots are only good for clothes and food." An activist had laid the charge in the Equality Court after failing to reach a mediated resolution in the Human Rights Commission, offended by Lucas's refusal to apologise for the comment. On 30 June 2015, the Upington Equality Court ruled that Lucas's remark constituted hate speech and ordered her to apologise to the Khoi and San people. Lucas appealed unsuccessfully to the Northern Cape High Court, saying that she did not believe it would serve justice or the public interest for her to apologise.

=== Contest for ANC provincial leadership ===
During the first two years of her premiership, Block did not hold a leadership office in the provincial ANC, which was chaired instead by MEC John Block. However, in April 2015, she was elected as the party's provincial treasurer after the incumbent, Yolanda Botha, died of cancer.

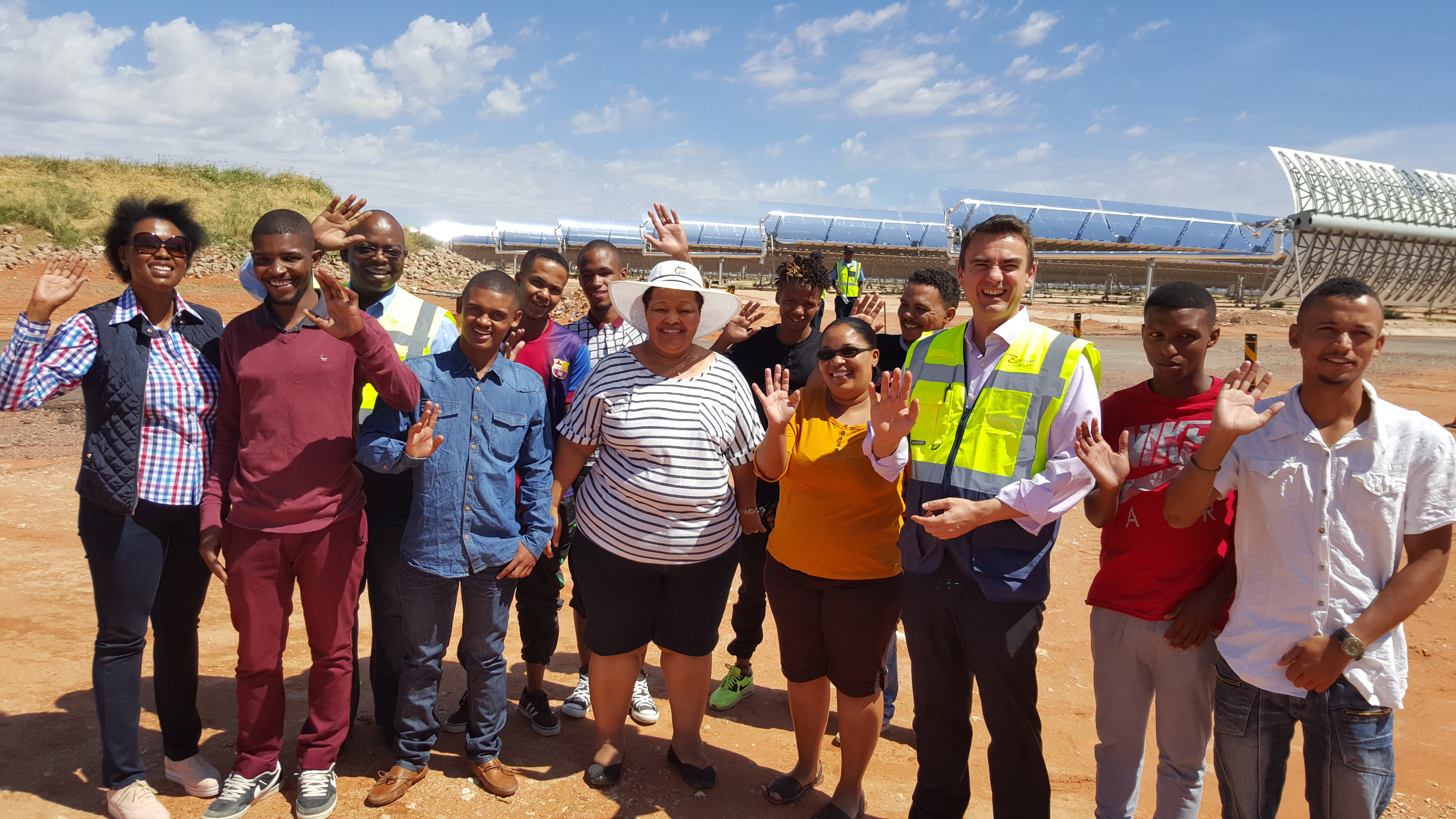
Lucas (centre) in the Northern Cape in February 2016

In late 2015, Block resigned in a corruption scandal, inaugurating a contest over his former position as ANC provincial chairperson. In the run-up to the party's next provincial elective conference in 2017, Lucas emerged as one of two main contenders for the vacant chairmanship; the other was the incumbent provincial secretary, Zamani Saul. Allies of each coalesced around competing factional slates of leadership candidates, nicknamed Sylvin (a portmanteau for Lucas and her ally Alvin Botes) and Zamdesh (for Saul and Deshi Nxanga) respectively. A parallel leadership contest was underway in the national party, and Lucas was viewed as a proxy of incumbent ANC president Jacob Zuma and his favored successor Nkosazana Dlamini-Zuma, while Saul was publicly backing national challenger Cyril Ramaphosa. As early as the nominations stage, the provincial leadership race became hostile, and Lucas's supporters began to protest putative procedural manipulation by Saul and his supporters.

The week of the provincial elective conference, Botha's supporters marched on Luthuli House, the ANC's national headquarters, demanding that the conference be postponed. Then, on 10 May 2017, in her capacity as premier, Lucas announced a controversial reshuffle of the Northern Cape government; she fired and replaced Finance MEC Mac Jack and Safety MEC Pauline Williams. The reshuffle was announced less than 24 hours before the opening of registration at the provincial conference, and some observers viewed it as Lucas's last-ditch effort to reverse her flagging electoral fortunes; Jack himself said that it was a blatant attempt to intimidate Saul's supporters. Saul described it as a "reckless and self-serving" ambush, pointing out that Lucas had not consulted the provincial ANC on the changes. The spokesperson of the national ANC, Zizi Kodwa, said in a statement that the reshuffle was divisive, an abuse of Lucas's government office, and a display of "unbridled arrogance." Lucas said that she stood by the reshuffle, and, denying that her motivations were self-serving, promised that, "After we have consulted with officials on a national level, we will make known what our reasons are, because we have got reasons."

When the elective conference opened in Colesberg that weekend, delegates openly criticized Lucas's reshuffle in their speeches. As the conference proceeded, Lucas's allies continued to argue that the conference should be postponed because of procedural irregularities, but without success. On 12 May, when voting began, every member of Lucas's slate of candidates unexpectedly declined their nominations to stand for election, and Lucas followed suit; the group departed the conference, leaving Saul to be unelected unopposed as provincial chairperson. Fufe Makatong was elected to succeed Lucas as provincial treasurer. Lucas said that contesting the election would have been an "exercise in futility," given the alleged procedural irregularities.

The factional battle continued after the conference. Lucas's supporters lodged a formal complaint with the ANC National Executive Committee about the election process, and the party's newly elected Provincial Executive Committee, under Saul's leadership, officially and publicly called for Lucas to reverse the government reshuffle she had announced as premier in the run-up to the conference; the provincial party said that the ANC must be "the only strategic centre of power" in the province. In early June 2017, the ANC National Executive decisively took Saul's side, announcing that it had instructed Lucas to obey the provincial party's instructions and reverse the reshuffle. Lucas obliged. However, while the Saul-led provincial party officially endorsed Ramaphosa's national leadership bid, Lucas remained an outspoken supporter of President Zuma.

=== ANC national leadership and succession ===
Excluded from the ANC's provincial leadership, Lucas attended the national party's 54th National Conference in December 2017, where Ramaphosa succeeded Zuma as ANC president. At the same conference, Lucas was very narrowly elected to the party's National Executive Committee; by number of votes received, she was ranked last of the 80 ordinary members elected.

Lucas served the remainder of her term as premier but was not nominated for another; ahead of the next general election in May 2019, the ANC announced Saul as the party's candidate for the premiership. Saul was formally elected to the position on 22 May 2019.

== Parliament of South Africa: 2019–present ==
In the May 2019 general election, Lucas left the provincial legislature and was instead elected to a seat in the national Parliament of South Africa, representing the ANC in the Northern Cape delegation to the upper house, the National Council of Provinces. At the chamber's first sitting on 23 May, she was elected unopposed as Deputy Chairperson of the National Council of Provinces, serving under chairperson Amos Masondo. During her inaugural parliamentary debate on the annual State of the Nation Address in early 2024, she controversially downplayed the import of loadshedding, describing it as "not the end of the world"; she subsequently apologised on national radio for her comments.

Concurrently to her parliamentary role, in her capacity as a member of the ANC National Executive Committee, Lucas was appointed as a member of the ANC's internal National Disciplinary Committee of Appeal in March 2022. However, she served only one term in the party's National Executive; at the next elective conference, the 55th National Conference in December 2022, she failed to gain re-election. In 2023, she launched a bid to become deputy president of the national ANC Women's League, but she was roundly defeated by Lungi Gcabashe, receiving only 62 votes to Gcabashe's 1,661 and Bernice Swarts's 1,190.

In the May 2024 general election, Lucas was elected to a seat in the lower parliamentary house, the National Assembly. She was appointed as chairperson of Parliament's Joint Standing Committee on Intelligence, though the committee was not constituted until 1 April 2025. She was also designated as a South African representative to the Southern African Development Community's Parliamentary Forum, and she was elected to a two-year term as vice president of the forum in December 2024, deputising Malagasy Justin Tokely.

== Personal life ==
Lucas was raised in the Catholic Church, which she has credited for her non-racial politics. Her grandfather was of Xhosa descent.

Lucas is her married name. Since July 2025, she has been listed in Parliament as Sylvia Izaks.
