= Executive Council (South Africa) =

Cabinet of a provincial government in South Africa

In South Africa, the Executive Council of a province is the cabinet of the provincial government. The Executive Council consists of the Premier and five to ten other members, who have the title "Member of the Executive Council", commonly abbreviated to "MEC".

MECs are appointed by the Premier from amongst the members of the provincial legislature; the Premier can also dismiss them. The provincial legislature may force the Premier to reconstitute the council by passing a motion of no confidence in the Executive Council excluding the Premier; if the legislature passes a motion of no confidence in the Executive Council including the Premier, then the Premier and the MECs must resign.

The Premier designates powers and functions to the MECs; conventionally they are assigned portfolios in specific areas of responsibility. They are accountable to the provincial legislature, both individually and as a collective, and must regularly report to the legislature on the performance of their responsibilities.

The Western Cape, the only province to have adopted its own constitution, chose to call its executive council the "Provincial Cabinet", and its MECs "Provincial Ministers".

== Membership of executive councils ==
The following tables show the members of the nine Executive Councils as of 2022.

=== Eastern Cape ===
Portfolio	MEC
Premier	Oscar Mabuyane
Finance	Mlungisi Mvoko
Education	Fundile Gade
Health	Ntandokazi Capa
Cooperative Governance and Traditional Affairs	Zolile Williams
Economic Development, Environmental Affairs, and Tourism	Nonkqubela Pieters
Sport, Recreation, Arts and Culture	Sibulele Ngongo
Social Development	Bukiwe Fanta
Public Works and Human Settlements	Siphokazi Mani-Lusithi
Transport and Community Safety	Xolile Nqatha
Agriculture	Nonceba Kontsiwe

=== Free State ===
Portfolio	MEC
Premier	Maqueen Letsoha-Mathae
Finance, Tourism and Economic Development	Ketso Makume
Public Works and Infrastructure	Dibolelo Mahlatsi
Social Development	Mathabo Leeto
Education	Mantlhake Maboya
Health	Monyatso Mahlatsi
Police, Roads and Transport	Jabu Mbalula
Agriculture, Rural Development and Environmental Affairs	Elzabe Rockman
Cooperative Governance and Traditional Affairs and Human Settlements	Dibolelo Mahlatsi
Sport, Arts, Culture and Recreation	Zanele Sifuba

=== Gauteng ===
Portfolio	MEC
Premier	Panyaza Lesufi
e-Government	Bonginkosi Dhlamini
Finance and Economic Development	Lebogang Maile
Education and Sports, Arts, Culture and Recreation	Matome Chiloane
Health and Wellness	Nomantu Nkomo-Ralehoko
Roads and Transport	Kedibone Diale-Tlabela
Human Settlements	Tasneem Motara
Social Development	Faith Mazibuko
Agriculture and Rural Development	Vuyiswa Ramokgopa
Infrastructure Development and Cooperative Governance and Traditional Affairs	Jacob Mamabolo
Environment	Sheila Mary Peters

=== KwaZulu-Natal ===
Portfolio	MEC
Premier	Thami Ntuli
Economic Development, Tourism and Environmental Affairs	Musa Zondi
Cooperative Governance and Traditional Affairs	Thulasizwe Buthelezi
Health	Nomagugu Simelane-Zulu
Social Development	Mbali Shinga
Public Works and Infrastructure	Martin Meyer
Finance	Francois Rodgers
Agriculture and Rural Development	Thembeni kaMadlopha-Mthethwa
Transport and Human Settlements	Siboniso Duma
Education	Sipho Hlomuka
Sports, Arts and Culture	Mntomuhle Khawula

=== Limpopo ===
Portfolio	MEC
Premier	Phophi Ramathuba
Agriculture and Rural Development	Nakedi Sibanda-Kekana
Cooperative Governance, Human Settlements and Traditional Affairs	Basikopo Makamu
Economic Development, Environment and Tourism	Tshitereke Matibe
Education	Mavhungu Lerule-Ramakhanya
Health	Dieketseng Masesi Mashego
Social Development	Florence Radzilani
Provincial Treasury	Kgabo Mahoai
Public Works, Roads and Infrastructure	Sebataolo Rachoene
Transport and Community Safety	Violet Mathye
Sport, Arts and Culture	Jerry Maseko

=== Mpumalanga ===
Portfolio	MEC
Premier	Mandla Ndlovu
Community Safety, Security, and Liaison	Khensane Macie
Education	Cathy Dlamini
Social Development	Khethiwe Moeketsi
Economic Development and Tourism	Makhosazane Masilela
Agriculture, Rural Development, Land and Environmental Affairs	Nompumelelo Hlophe
Public Works, Roads, and Transport	Thulasizwe Thomo
Finance	Bonakele Majuba
Culture, Sport, and Recreation	Leah Mabuza
Health	Sasekani Manzini
Human Settlements and Co-Operative Governance and Traditional Affairs	Speedy Mashilo

=== North West ===
Portfolio	MEC
Premier	Bushy Maape
Agriculture and Rural Development	Madoda Sambatha
Economic Development, Environment and Tourism	Bitsa Lenkopane
Education	Viola Motsumi
Finance	Kenetswe Mosenogi
Health	Sello Lehari
Cooperative Governance, Human Settlement and Traditional Affairs	Oagile Saliva Molapisi
Public Works and Roads	Elizabeth Mokua
Community Safety and Transport Management	Wessels Morweng
Social Development	Sussana Dantjie
Sport, Arts and Culture	Tsotso Tlhapi

=== Northern Cape ===
Portfolio	MEC
Premier	Zamani Saul
Health	Maruping Lekwene
Agriculture, Environmental Affairs, Rural Development and Land Reform	Mase Manopole
Social Development, Youth, Women, and People living with Disabilities	Nontobeko Vilakazi
Sports, Arts, and Culture	Mangaliso Matika
Finance, Economic Development and Tourism	Venus Blennies
Roads and Public Works	Fufe Makatong
Education	Abraham Vosloo
Cooperative Governance, Human Settlements, Traditional Affairs	Bentley Vass
Transport, Safety and Liaison	Limakatso Koloi

=== Western Cape ===
Portfolio	MEC
Premier	Alan Winde
Finance	Deidré Baartman
Community Safety and Police Oversight	Anroux Marais
Education	David Maynier
Health and Wellness	Mireille Wenger
Infrastructure	Tertuis Simmers
Social Development	Jaco Londt
Mobility	Isaac Sileku
Agriculture, Economic Development, and Tourism	Ivan Meyer
Cultural Affairs and Sport	Ricardo Mackenzie
Local Government, Environmental Affairs and Development Planning	Anton Bredell
