= 2024 Northern Cape provincial election =

The 2024 Northern Cape provincial election was held on 29 May 2024 to allocate the 30 seats of the Northern Cape Provincial Legislature. Like all the South African provincial elections, it was held on the same day as the South African general election. 24 political parties participated in the election, of which only the African National Congress, Democratic Alliance, Economic Freedom Fighters, Patriotic Alliance and Freedom Front Plus (VF+) won seats. The ANC lost three seats and lost its outright majority, while remaining the largest party at 15 seats. The DA lost one seat, the EFF gained one, and the VF+ retained its single seat, while the new PA won three.

== Background ==
The 2019 election saw 21 political parties participating in the election, of which only the African National Congress, Democratic Alliance, Economic Freedom Fighters, and Freedom Front Plus won seats. The ANC lost two seats, but maintained a majority.

== Results ==
Party	Votes	%
African National Congress	195,267	49.34
Democratic Alliance	83,848	21.19
Economic Freedom Fighters	52,433	13.25
Patriotic Alliance	34,180	8.64
Freedom Front Plus	7,239	1.83
Northern Cape Communities Movement	6,547	1.65
uMkhonto weSizwe	3,111	0.79
ActionSA	2,015	0.51
Good	1,849	0.47
#Hope4SA	1,745	0.44
African Christian Democratic Party	1,498	0.38
Congress of the People	1,007	0.25
Build One South Africa	995	0.25
Pan Africanist Congress of Azania	701	0.18
Rise Mzansi	627	0.16
Africa Restoration Alliance	458	0.12
African Congress for Transformation	453	0.11
Arise South Africa	418	0.11
African Transformation Movement	412	0.10
Inkatha Freedom Party	303	0.08
People's Movement for Change	188	0.05
South African Royal Kingdoms Association	177	0.04
All Citizens Party	173	0.04
South African Youth Power Party	138	0.03
Total	395,782	100.00
Source: Electoral Commission of South Africa

== Aftermath ==
Due to no party obtaining a majority, negotiations were expected to form a coalition government in the province. The ANC was expected to be re-elected as the government after the Freedom Front Plus pledged to support them on matters of confidence and supply. The ANC later completed the deal with the FF+ in exchange for concessions over Orania. The ANC were re-elected with the backing of the FF+ and the Patriotic Alliance.
