= Zamani Saul =

South African politician (born 1972)

The Honourable Zamani Saul MPL
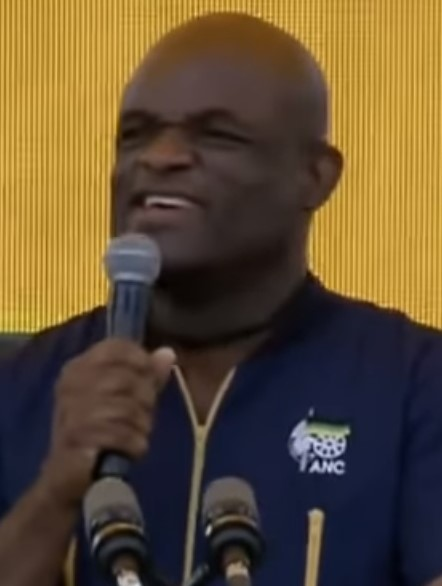
- Saul in 2020

5th Premier of the Northern Cape
- Incumbent
- Assumed office 22 May 2019
- Preceded by: Sylvia Lucas

Chairperson of the African National Congress in the Northern Cape
- Incumbent
- Assumed office 12 May 2017
- Deputy: Bentley Vass
- Preceded by: John Block

Secretary of the African National Congress in the Northern Cape
- In office 29 August 2008 – 12 May 2017
- Deputy: Alvin Botes
- Preceded by: Neville Mompati
- Succeeded by: Deshi Ngxanga

Deputy Secretary of the African National Congress in the Northern Cape
- In office March 2004 – 29 August 2008
- Preceded by: John Block
- Succeeded by: Alvin Botes

Member of the Northern Cape Provincial Legislature
- Incumbent
- Assumed office 22 May 2019

Personal details
- Born: 7 March 1972 (age 54)
- Party: African National Congress
- Education: University of the Western Cape; University of the Free State; University of South Africa
- Occupation: Politician

Zamani Saul (born 7 March 1972) is a South African politician who is the 5th and current Premier of the Northern Cape and a Member of the Northern Cape Provincial Legislature. He has also been serving as the Provincial Chairperson of the African National Congress (ANC) since his election on 12 May 2017. He previously served as the Provincial Secretary and as the Deputy Provincial Secretary of the party.

== Life and education ==
Zamani Saul completed his Grade 12 at Umso High School in Colesberg. He obtained a master's degree in Development Studies from the University of the Free State and a Master of Laws degree from the University of the Western Cape. He, later on, also achieved a Doctorate of Laws degree in Public Law and Jurisprudence from the same university. Saul is currently studying towards a Doctorate of Philosophy in Multi-Disciplinary Studies through the University of South Africa. He is married to Tapsy Saul, and they have children together. Their one son matriculated in 2018.

== Political career ==
Saul served as the municipal manager of the Pixley ka Seme District Municipality from 2000 to 2008. He served as ANC Deputy Provincial Secretary from 2004 until his election as Provincial Secretary in 2008. He won re-election to a second term in 2012.

On 12 May 2017, Saul was elected unopposed as the Provincial Chairperson of the African National Congress in the Northern Cape after Premier Sylvia Lucas had withdrawn her nomination for the position. Saul succeeded John Block, who had resigned from the position in October 2015. Deshi Ngxanga succeeded Saul as Provincial Secretary.

Saul is seen as someone who is aligned with the Ramaphosa faction of the African National Congress, as he endorsed Cyril Ramaphosa to become ANC President in 2017. On 8 May 2019, the ANC retained their majority in the Northern Cape Provincial Legislature. Saul was selected as the party's premier candidate on 13 May 2019. He assumed the office on 22 May 2019. In his first few months, he pledged to cut what he called "wastage" from the Northern Cape government; he declared that it was unacceptable and wasteful spending that as Premier he would be offered a bowl of fresh fruit every morning in his office and that his official car of Premier would be replaced after 120,000 km while ambulances in the province would run 952,000+km before replacement. Accordingly, he banned Northern Cape ministers from getting new cars and used the money to buy 63 new ambulances instead.

Political offices
Preceded by Sylvia Lucas	5th Premier of the Northern Cape; 2019–present	Incumbent
Party political offices
Preceded by John Block	Provincial Chairperson of the African National Congress; 2017–present	Incumbent
Preceded by Neville Mompati	Provincial Secretary of the African National Congress; 2008–2017	Succeeded by Deshi Ngxanga
Preceded by John Block	Deputy Provincial Secretary of the African National Congress; 2004–2008	Succeeded by Alvin Botes
