= Northern Cape Provincial Legislature =

Legislature of the Northern Cape Province

Coordinates: 28.734°S 24.720°E

Northern Cape Provincial Legislature Noord-Kaapse Provinsiale Wetgewer (Afrikaans) Indlu yoWiso-mthetho yePhondo laseMntla-Kapa (Xhosa)
- 7th Legislature

Type
- Type: Unicameral

History
- Founded: 27 April 1994

Leadership
- Speaker: Newrene Klaaste, ANC since 22 May 2019
- Deputy Speaker: Sharifa Ferris, PA since 12 March 2025
- Premier: Zamani Saul, ANC since 22 May 2019
- Leader of the Opposition: Isak Fritz, DA since December 2025

Structure
- Seats: 30
- Political groups: Government (15): ANC (15); Confidence and supply (4): PA (3); FF+ (1); Opposition (11): DA (7); EFF (4)

Elections
- Voting system: Party-list proportional representation
- Last election: 29 May 2024

Meeting place
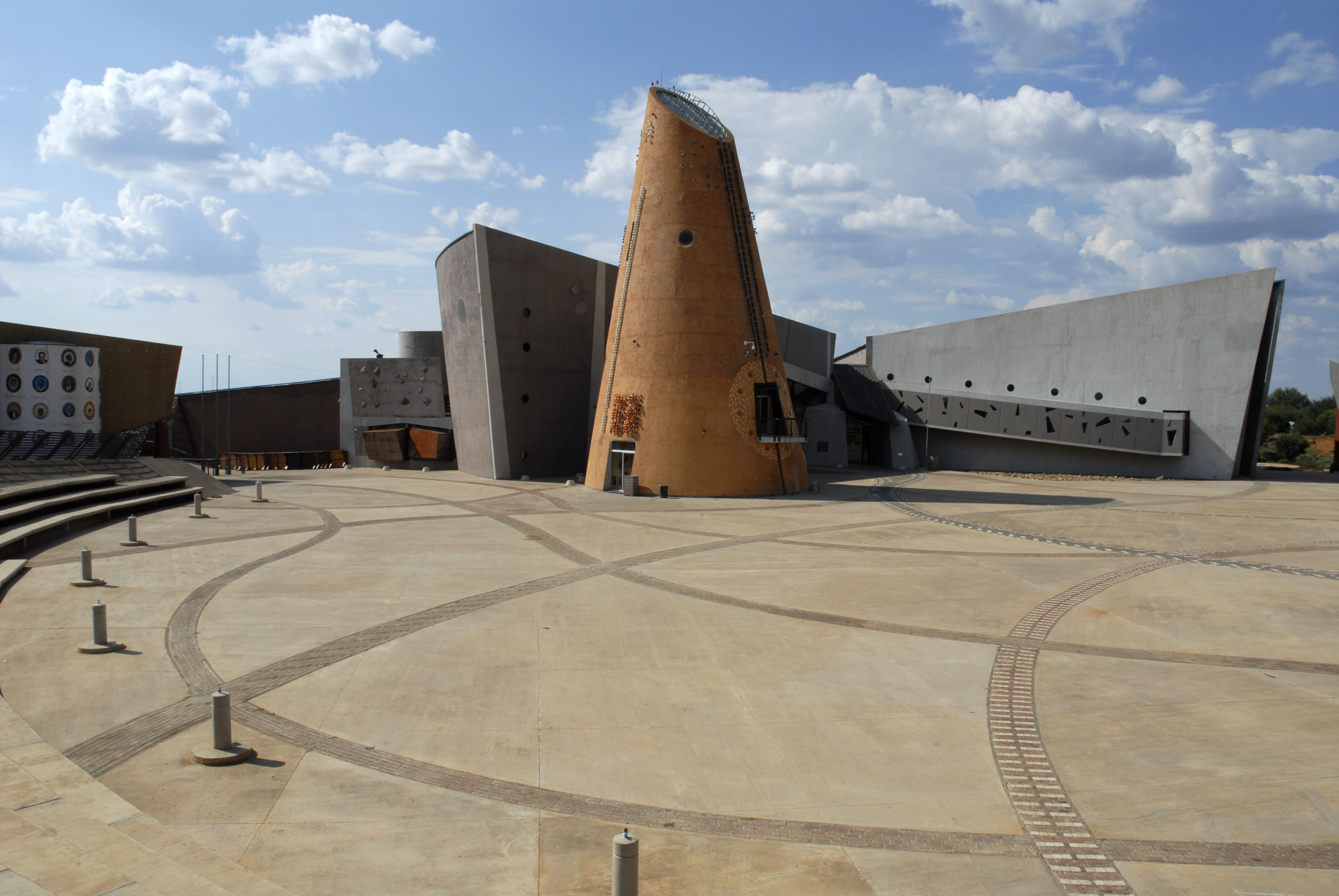
- New Provincial Legislature Building, Galeshewe, Kimberley

Website
- www.ncpleg.gov.za

The Northern Cape Provincial Legislature is the legislature of the Northern Cape province of South Africa. It is a unicameral body of 30 members elected every five years. The current legislature was elected on 29 May 2024 with the African National Congress getting the most seats (15 members). It is situated in Kimberley, in a newly built complex to the west of the city centre on the edge of Galeshewe.

The Northern Cape Provincial Legislature, like the eight other provincial legislatures in South Africa, was created on 27 April 1994 by the Interim Constitution of South Africa, which dissolved the four original provinces (and their provincial councils) and created the nine current provinces. It is currently constituted in terms of Chapter Six of the Constitution of South Africa, which defines the structure of the provincial governments.

== Powers ==
The Northern Cape Provincial Legislature chooses the Premier of the Northern Cape, the head of the Northern Cape's provincial executive. The legislature can force the Premier to resign by passing a motion of no confidence. Although the Executive Council is appointed by the Premier, the legislature may pass a motion of no confidence to force the Premier to restructure the Council. The legislature also appoints the Northern Cape's delegates to the National Council of Provinces, allocating delegates to parties in proportion to the number of seats each party holds in the legislature.

The legislature has the power to pass legislation in various fields specified in the national constitution; in some fields, the legislative power is shared with the national parliament, while in others it is solely reserved to the Northern Cape alone. The fields include health, education (except universities), agriculture, housing, environmental protection, and development planning.

The legislature oversees the administration of the Northern Cape provincial government, and the Premier and the members of the Executive Council are obliged to report to the legislature on the performance of their responsibilities. The legislature also administers the finances of the provincial government by way of the appropriation bills which determine the province's annual budget.

== Election ==
The provincial legislature consists of 30 members, who are elected through a system of party list proportional representation with closed lists. In other words, each voter casts a vote for one political party, and seats in the legislature are allocated to the parties in proportion to the number of votes received. The seats are then filled by members in accordance with lists submitted by the parties before the election.

The legislature is elected for a term of five years unless it is dissolved early. This may occur if the legislature votes to dissolve and it is at least three years since the last election, or if the Premiership falls vacant and the legislature fails to elect a new Premier within ninety days. By convention, all nine provincial legislatures and the National Assembly are elected on the same day.

The most recent election was held on 29 May 2024. The following table summarizes the results.

Party	Votes	Vote %	Seats
African National Congress	195,267	49.34	15
DA	83,848	21.19	7
Economic Freedom Fighters	52,433	13.25	4
Patriotic alliance	34,180	8.64	3
VF+	7,239	1.83	1
Other parties	22,815	5.76	0
Total	395,782	100	30

The following table shows the composition of the provincial parliament after past elections and floor-crossing periods.

Event	ACDP	ANC	COPE	DP/DA	EFF	FF/FF+	ID	NP/NNP	PA
1994 election	0	15	—	1	—	2	—	12	—
1999 election	0	20	—	1	—	1	—	8	—
2004 election	1	21	—	3	—	1	2	2	—
2005 floor-crossing	1	24	—	3	—	1	1	—	—
2007 floor-crossing	1	25	—	2	—	1	1	—	—
2009 election	0	19	5	4	—	0	2	—	—
2014 election	0	20	1	7	2	0	—	—	—
2019 election	0	18	0	8	3	1	—	—	—
2024 election	0	15	0	7	4	1	—	—	3

== Officers ==
The Speaker is the political head of the legislature. The following people have served as Speaker:

Name	Entered office	Left office	Party
Ethne Papenfus	1994	2004	DP
Constance Seoposengwe	2004	2009	ANC
Goolam Akharwaray	2009	2009	ANC
Jacobus Frederick van Wyk	2009	2013	ANC
Kenny Mmoiemang	2013	2019	ANC
Newrene Klaaste	2019	Incumbent	ANC
