= List of National Council of Provinces members of the 27th Parliament of South Africa =

This is a list of members of the National Council of Provinces of the 27th South African Parliament.

== Composition ==
Party	Delegate type	Province									Total	
Party	Delegate type	EC	FS	G	KZN	L	M	NW	NC	WC	Total	
African National Congress	Permanent	4	3	3	3	4	4	3	3	2	29	54
African National Congress	Special	3	3	2	3	4	3	3	3	1	25	54
Democratic Alliance	Permanent	1	1	2	1	1	1	1	2	3	13	20
Democratic Alliance	Special	1	1	1					1	3	7	20
Economic Freedom Fighters	Permanent	1	1	1	1	1	1	1	1	1	9	11
Economic Freedom Fighters	Special			1				1			2	11
Freedom Front Plus	Permanent		1					1			2	3
Freedom Front Plus	Special						1				1	3
Inkatha Freedom Party	Permanent				1						1	2
Inkatha Freedom Party	Special				1						1	2
Total		10	10	10	10	10	10	10	10	10	90	

== Permanent delegates ==
=== Eastern Cape ===
- Noluvuyo Tafeni (EFF)
- Zolani Mkiva (ANC)
- Zukiswa Ncitha (ANC)
- Nokuzola Ndongeni (ANC)
- Mlindi Nhanha (DA)
- Mandla Rayi (ANC)

=== Free State ===
- Mr Michiel Adriaan Petrus De Bruyn (FF+)
- George Michalakis (DA)
- Seiso Mohai (ANC)
- Moletsane Moletsane (EFF)
- Moji Lydia Moshodi (ANC)
- Itumeleng Ntsube (ANC)

=== Gauteng ===
- Mbulelo Bara (DA)
- Mohammed Dangor (ANC)
- Amos Masondo (ANC)
- Kenny Motsamai (EFF)
- Winnie Ngwenya (ANC)
- Dennis Ryder (DA)

=== KwaZulu-Natal ===
- Lindiwe Bebee (ANC)
- Tim Brauteseth (DA)
- Yunus Carrim (ANC)
- S'lindile Luthuli (EFF)
- Nhlanhla Mzungezwa Hadebe (IFP)
- Muzi Mthethwa (ANC)

=== Limpopo ===
- Mmamora Lilliet Mamaregane (ANC)
- Thembani Lucia Hlabangwani (EFF)
- Tebogo Portia Mamorobela (ANC)
- Mamagase Elleck Nchabeleng (ANC)
- Shahidabibi Shaikh (ANC)
- Beyers Smit (DA)

=== Mpumalanga ===
- Sonja Boshoff (DA)
- Dikeledi Gladys Mahlangu (ANC)
- Audrey Maleka (ANC)
- Archibold Nyambi (ANC)
- Mbali Dlamini (EFF)
- Nomgqibelo Ethel Nkosi (ANC)

=== Northern Cape ===
- Willie Aucamp (DA)
- Martha Bartlett (ANC)
- Delmaine Christians (DA)
- Sylvia Lucas (ANC)
- Kenny Mmoiemang (ANC)
- Mmabatho Mokause (EFF)

=== North West ===
- China Dodovu (ANC)
- Fanie du Toit (FF+)
- Eric Landsman (ANC)
- Betta Lehihi (EFF)
- Tebogo Modise (ANC)
- Carin Visser (DA)

=== Western Cape ===
- Mbulelo Magwala (EFF)
- Linda Nellie Moss (ANC)
- Cathlene Labuschagne (DA)
- Jaco Londt (DA)
- Edward Njadu (ANC)
- Frederik Jacobus Badenhorst (DA)
