= List of National Council of Provinces members of the 28th Parliament of South Africa =

This is a list of permanent delegates to the National Council of Provinces of the 28th Parliament of South Africa.

== Members of the NCOP ==
The following members were sworn in on 15 June 2024.

Member	Party	Province
Jeanne Adriaanse	DA	North West
Laetitia Arries	EFF	North West
Rikus Badenhorst	DA	Western Cape
Mathilda Bains	ANC	Western Cape
Mzamo Billy	DA	KwaZulu-Natal
Sonja Boshoff	DA	Mpumalanga
Tammy Breedt	FF+	Free State
Henni Britz	DA	Eastern Cape
Khanya Ceza	EFF	Mpumalanga
Naledi Chirwa	EFF	Gauteng
Mapule Dhlamini	ANC	Free State
Nicola du Plessis	DA	Gauteng
Bino Farmer	PA	Western Cape
Makhi Feni	ANC	Eastern Cape
Desery Fienies	ANC	Northern Cape
Virgill Gericke	EFF	Western Cape
Nicholas Gotsell	DA	Western Cape
Poobalan Govender	IFP	KwaZulu-Natal
Mxolisi Kaunda	ANC	KwaZulu-Natal
Meisie Kennedy	EFF	Limpopo
Tidimalo Legwase	ANC	North West
Baakisang Solomon Mabebo	ANC	North West
Patrick Mabilo	ANC	Northern Cape
Sibongiseni Majola	MK	KwaZulu-Natal
Mandisa Makesini	EFF	Free State
Jane Mananiso	ANC	Gauteng
Nolubabalo Mciinga	EFF	Eastern Cape
Kim Medupe	ANC	North West
Kenny Mmoiemang	ANC	Northern Cape
Mpho Modise	ANC	Gauteng
Ofentse Mokae	DA	Northern Cape
Seeng Mokoena	MK	KwaZulu-Natal
Frans Mokwele	ANC	Limpopo
Regina Molokomme	ANC	Limpopo
Refilwe Mtsweni-Tsipane	ANC	Mpumalanga
Sanny Ndhlovu	ANC	Limpopo
Mary Ndangisa	ANC	Eastern Cape
Zanathembu Ngcobo	MK	KwaZulu-Natal
Pitso Noe	ANC	Free State
Mwelo Nonkonyane	ANC	Eastern Cape
Sylvia Nxumalo	ANC	Mpumalanga
Edward Nzimande	MK	Gauteng
Mandla Peter	UDM	Eastern Cape
Phiroene Phala	ANC	Limpopo
Nico Pienaar	DA	Limpopo
Bheki Radebe	ANC	Free State
Dennis Ryder	DA	Gauteng
Igor Scheurkogel	DA	Free State
Pat Sibande	ANC	Mpumalanga
Sylvia Sithole	ANC	North West
Mathapelo Siwisa	EFF	Northern Cape
Paul Swart	DA	Western Cape
Hendrik van den Berg	FF+	Northern Cape
Sifiso Zulu	MK	Mpumalanga

== Vacancies and replacements ==
Party	Province	Seat vacated by	Date of vacancy	Reason for vacancy	Replaced by	Date of replacement
ANC	Western Cape	Mathilda Bains	27 August 2025	Died		
