= Joint Committee on Ethics and Members' Interest =

Committee in the Parliament of South Africa

- Formation: 1999
- Purpose: Implementation of the parliamentary code of conduct
- Chairpersons: Lusizo Makhubela-Mashele (ANC); Henni Britz (DA)
- Parent organisation: Parliament of South Africa

The Joint Committee on Ethics and Members' Interest is a joint committee of the Parliament of South Africa that deals with the ethical conduct of Members of Parliament and the disclosure of their financial interests. Its primary function is to promote and oversee the implementation of the parliamentary code of conduct, including by publishing the annual Register of Members' Interests and conducting disciplinary hearings to investigate allegations of misconduct by Members of Parliament.

In the 27th Parliament, the Committee comprises 14 members from the National Assembly and nine delegates from the National Council of Provinces. On 14 November 2024, Lusizo Makhubela-Mashele (of the National Assembly) and Henni Britz (of the National Council of Provinces) were elected as its co-chairpersons.

== History and activities ==
The committee was established in 1999 at the outset of the 23rd Parliament in a merger between the Committee on Ethics (spearheaded by Kader Asmal) and the Committee on Members' Interests. Bernard Ncube was the inaugural chairperson, with Lawrence Mushwana as her deputy.

Since then, the committee has held several high-profile proceedings, including disciplinary investigations into the conduct of Winnie Madikizela-Mandela, Deputy President Jacob Zuma, Yolanda Botha, and Dina Pule. In such cases, the Committee makes disciplinary findings and recommends sanctions, but these must be adopted by Parliament in a plenary before they are implemented. The committee has sometimes been criticised as being overly lax in enforcing disciplinary standards.

== List of chairpersons ==
Since the outset of the 25th Parliament in 2009, the committee has had two co-chairpersons, one representing the National Assembly and one representing the National Council of Provinces. The following people have served as chairpersons of the committee.

Chairpersons of the Joint Committee on Ethics and Members' Interest
Session	National Assembly		National Council of Provinces		Election date	Citation
28th Parliament	Lusizo Makhubela-Mashele	ANC	Henni Britz	DA	14 November 2024	
27th Parliament	Bekizwe Nkosi	ANC	Lydia Moshodi	ANC	11 September 2019	
26th Parliament	Humphrey Maxegwana	ANC	Omie Singh	ANC	25 October 2018	
26th Parliament	Amos Masondo	ANC	Omie Singh	ANC	8 July 2014	
25th Parliament	Ben Turok	ANC	Buoang Mashile	ANC	8 February 2011	
25th Parliament	Luwellyn Landers	ANC	Buoang Mashile	ANC	27 August 2009	
24th Parliament	Luwellyn Landers	ANC	None		25 June 2004	
23rd Parliament	Bernard Ncube	ANC	None		11 October 1999	
