= Henni Britz =

South African lawyer and politician

Henni Britz MP

Co-chairperson of the Joint Committee on Ethics and Members' Interests
- Incumbent
- Assumed office 14 November 2024 Serving with Lusizo Makhubela-Mashele
- Preceded by: Lydia Moshodi

Permanent Delegate to the National Council of Provinces from the Eastern Cape
- Incumbent
- Assumed office 15 June 2024

Personal details
- Born: Joseph Hendrik Pieter Britz; 1966 or 1967 (age 59–60)
- Party: Democratic Alliance
- Education: University of Pretoria (B.luris, B.Proc)
- Profession: Lawyer, politician

Joseph Hendrik Pieter Britz (born 1966 or 1967) is a South African lawyer and politician who has been a Permanent Delegate to the National Council of Provinces since 2024. A member of the Democratic Alliance, he previously served as a councillor in the Sarah Baartman District Municipality.

== Early life and education ==
Britz grew up in Petersfield and attended Jan van Riebeeck Primary School in Cape Town. He matriculated from Huguenot Boys' High School in 1984 before going on to study at the University of Pretoria, from which he graduated with B.luris and B.Proc degrees. Britz had to work to support his family and found employment at the Pilkington Glass Factory, the Impala Platinum Refinery and the Jan Smuts Airport (now known as the O.R. Tambo International Airport). After graduating, Britz completed his mandatory national service in the South African Air Force as a legal officer with the rank of lieutenant.

== Career ==
Britz began his legal career as a public prosecutor in the Johannesburg and Soweto Magistrates' Courts. He was soon promoted to regional public prosecutor before becoming a prosecutor in the specialist courts. Britz became a magistrate in Johannesburg and Soweto at age 23 before being transferred to Springs in 1990 where he was a magistrate in the criminal and civil courts in Springs and KwaThema. Prior to becoming involved in local politics, he founded Brits Attorneys in Springs in 1993. In the late 1990s, Britz was elected ward councillor for ward 1 in the Springs municipality as a member of the Springs Forum party.

Britz and his family moved to Jeffreys Bay following the conclusion of his term. He joined the Democratic Alliance in 2005 and was later elected a councillor in the Sarah Baartman District Municipality.

== Parliamentary career ==
Following the 2024 general election, Britz was sworn in as a Permanent Delegate to the National Council of Provinces. In November 2024, he was elected to co-chair the Joint Committee on Ethics and Members' Interests.
