= Mbulelo =

Mbulelo (Nombulelo female) is a masculine South African given name derived from the Xhosa word bulela, meaning "gratitude". Notable people with the given name include:

- Mbulelo Bara, South African politician
- Mbulelo Botile (born 1972), South African boxer
- Mbulelo Budaza (born 1993), South African cricketer
- Mbulelo Goniwe (born 1958), South African politician
- Mbulelo Mabizela (born 1980), South African soccer player
- Mbulelo Magwala, South African politician
- Mbulelo Mzamane (1948–2014), South African author, poet, and academic
- Mbulelo Sogoni (born 1966), South African politician
- Mbulelo Wagaba (born 1996), South African soccer player
