= Omie Singh =

South African politician and businessman (born 1957)

Chairperson of the Joint Committee on Ethics and Members' Interests
- In office 8 July 2014 – 7 May 2019 Serving with Amos Masondo and Humphrey Maxegwana
- Preceded by: Buoang Mashile
- Succeeded by: Lydia Moshodi

Delegate to the National Council of Provinces

Assembly Member for KwaZulu-Natal
- In office 22 May 2014 – 7 May 2019

Member of the KwaZulu-Natal Legislature
- In office October 2001 – May 2014

Member of the National Assembly
- In office June 1999 – 1 October 2001
- Constituency: KwaZulu-Natal

Personal details
- Born: Aumsensingh Singh; 22 June 1957 (age 68) Durban, Natal Province; Union of South Africa
- Party: African National Congress (since March 2003)
- Other political affiliations: Democratic Party (until March 2003)

Aumsensingh "Omie" Singh (born 22 June 1957) is a South African politician and businessman from KwaZulu-Natal. From 2014 to 2019, he represented the African National Congress (ANC) in the National Council of Provinces, where he co-chaired Parliament's Joint Committee on Ethics and Members' Interests. Before that, he served in the KwaZulu-Natal Legislature from 2001 to 2014 and in the National Assembly from 1999 to 2001. Having entered politics as a member of the Democratic Party (DP), he joined the ANC by floor-crossing in March 2003.

== Early life and career ==
Born on 22 June 1957 in Durban, Singh attended Chatsworth High School. He joined the Progressive Federal Party, a predecessor to the DP, in 1986. He was a businessman until he became involved in frontline politics after the end of apartheid.

== Legislative career ==
Singh was a local councillor for the DP in Durban until the 1999 general election, when he was elected to a DP seat in the KwaZulu-Natal caucus of the National Assembly. He served in the seat for a little over two years, leaving on 1 October 2001 to join the KwaZulu-Natal Legislature, where he swopped seats with Mark Lowe.

In March 2003, while he was serving in the provincial legislature, Singh became the first public representative to take advantage of that month's floor-crossing window, announcing that he had resigned from the DP in order to join the ANC. He reportedly disagreed with the DP's decision to cooperate more closely with the Inkatha Freedom Party (IFP). He served the rest of the legislative term under the ANC banner and was re-elected to a full term in the seat, on the ANC's party list, in the 2004 general election. He was re-elected in 2009.

In the 2014 general election, Singh was elected to the KwaZulu-Natal caucus of the National Council of Provinces. He served a single term there and co-chaired Parliament's Joint Committee on Ethics and Members' Interests. He left Parliament after the 2019 general election and retired from frontline politics, though he was active as president of the KwaZulu-Natal International Business Association, as well as active in community organising in Phoenix, KwaZulu-Natal.
