= Maleka =

Maleka may refer to:

- Maleka Begum (born 1944), Bangladeshi academic
- Maleka Higgins, American shooting victim
- Maleka Parvin, Bangladeshi Kabaddi player
- Audrey Maleka, South African politician
- Shahnaz Parvin Maleka, Bangladeshi Kabaddi player

== See also ==
- Malekan (electoral district)
