= Sylvia Nxumalo =

South African politician (born 1970)

The Honourable Sylvia Nxumalo MP

Delegate to the National Council of Provinces

Assembly Member for Mpumalanga
- Incumbent
- Assumed office 15 June 2024

Mayor of Bushbuckridge
- In office August 2016 – June 2024
- Preceded by: Renias Khumalo

Personal details
- Born: 24 September 1970 (age 55)
- Citizenship: South Africa
- Party: African National Congress

Cecilia Sylvia Nxumalo (born 24 September 1970) is a South African politician from Mpumalanga. She has represented the African National Congress in the National Council of Provinces since June 2024.

Nxumalo was formerly the mayor of Bushbuckridge Local Municipality between August 2016 and June 2024. She entered professional politics as a local councillor in Bushbuckridge in 2006 and was elected as mayor in the 2016 local elections.

== Early life and career ==
Nxumalo was born on 24 September 1970. She began her professional political career in 2006 as a local councillor in the Bushbuckridge Local Municipality in Mpumalanga Province. The municipality was a stronghold of her political party, the African National Congress (ANC), and Nxumalo went on to serve as the council's first woman chief whip.

== Mayor of Bushbuckridge: 2016–2024 ==
She was elected to her third consecutive term as a councillor in the August 2016 local elections, in which she served as the ANC's head of elections in municipalities across Mpumalanga. After the election, on 9 August 2016, the ANC announced that it would support her for election as mayor of Bushbuckridge. She held the mayoral office for the next eight years, gaining re-election in the November 2021 local elections and becoming the town's longest-serving mayor. During that time she was also one of three deputy provincial chairpersons of the Mpumalanga branch of the South African Local Government Association, having gained election to that office in October 2016.

During Nxumalo's first year as mayor, Bushbuckridge received a clean audit from the Auditor-General and was honoured by the Chartered Institute of Government Finance, Audit and Risk Officers as the South African municipality with the best improvement in annual audit outcomes. Over the next five years Nxumalo launched a number of infrastructure initiatives in the town, including a new R8.1-million water reticulation and purification system on the Sabie River, constructed in collaboration with the Kruger National Park, and an R11-million paved road connecting Malubane village to the R536. In February 2019 she announced that the Bushbuckridge Local Municipality had terminated its contract with Rand Water and henceforth would in-source municipal bulk water supply in order to save costs.

Nxumalo later said that she had taken office with a single-minded intention "to speed up the service delivery vehicle". However, Bushbuckridge residents continued to lodge violent service delivery protests throughout her mayoral term, including in Ga-Modibidi in 2019, in Mapulaneng in 2021, in Marongwane in 2022, and in Acornhoek in 2023.

== National Council of Provinces: 2024–present ==
In the May 2024 general election, Nxumalo stood as an ANC candidate, ranked 34th on the party list for election to the Mpumalanga Provincial Legislature. She was not elected to the provincial legislature but instead became an ANC delegate to the Mpumalanga caucus of the National Council of Provinces (NCOP), the upper house of the South African Parliament. She vacated her mayoral office when she was sworn in to Parliament on 15 June 2024.

She was appointed as the whip of the NCOP's Mpumalanga delegation, and she also became the ANC's whip in the Select Committee on Finance and Select Committee on Appropriations. In addition, with Patrick Mabilo and Makhi Feni, she was one of three members whom the NCOP designated to serve on the Magistrates Commission as a parliamentary representative.

== See also ==
- Bushbuckridge Local Municipality elections
