= Buoang Mashile =

South African politician (born 1957)

Member of the National Assembly
- In office 21 May 2014 – 7 May 2019
- In office 14 May 2004 – May 2009
- Constituency: Limpopo

Chairperson of the Joint Committee on Ethics and Members' Interest
- In office 27 August 2009 – 21 April 2014 Serving with Luwellyn Landers and Ben Turok
- Succeeded by: Omie Singh

Delegate to the National Council of Provinces

Assembly Member for Mpumalanga
- In office 7 May 2009 – 21 April 2014

Personal details
- Born: Buoang Lemias Mashile; 17 December 1957 (age 68)
- Citizenship: South Africa
- Party: African National Congress

Buoang Lemias Mashile (born 17 December 1957) is a South African politician who represented the African National Congress (ANC) in Parliament from 2004 to 2019. He served in the National Assembly for two non-consecutive terms from 2004 to 2009 and from 2014 to 2019. In the interim, he served in the Mpumalanga caucus of the National Council of Provinces (NCOP).

== Legislative career ==
Mashile joined the National Assembly on 14 May 2004, filling a seat in the Limpopo constituency that had initially been designated for Mninwa Mahlangu; Mahlangu joined the NCOP instead. After one term in the seat, Mashile moved to the NCOP after the 2009 general election. In the NCOP, he was a member of the Mpumalanga caucus, and he was elected as co-chairperson of Parliament's Joint Committee on Ethics and Members' Interests; he served alongside the National Assembly's Luwellyn Landers and later Ben Turok.

In the 2014 general election, Mashile returned to the National Assembly on the ANC's national party list. The ANC nominated him to chair the Portfolio Committee on Home Affairs. In May 2018, in a reshuffle of the ANC's parliamentary caucus, he replaced Fezeka Loliwe as chairperson of the Portfolio Committee on Labour. He held the latter position until the 2019 general election, when he vacated his legislative seat.
