= 28th South African Parliament =

Parliament of South Africa, 2024–2029

| ← | 27th | 29th | → |
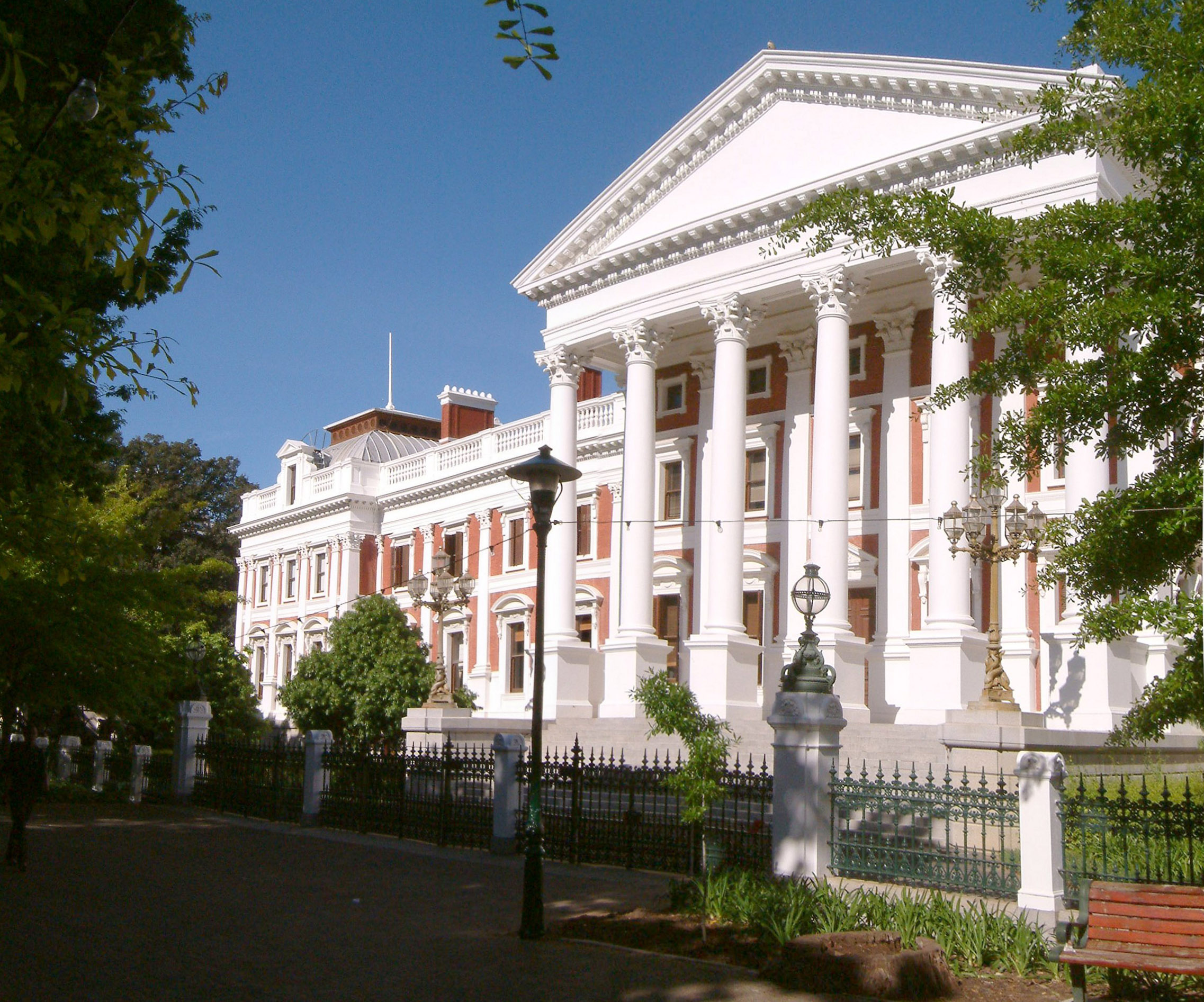
- Houses of Parliament in Cape Town, South Africa

Overview
- Jurisdiction: South Africa
- Meeting place: Cape Town
- Term: 14 June 2024–

National Assembly of South Africa
- Composition of the National Assembly
- Members: 400
- Speaker: Thoko Didiza (ANC)
- Deputy Speaker: Annelie Lotriet (DA)

National Council of Provinces
- Composition of the National Council of Provinces
- Members: 90
- Chairperson: Refilwe Mtsweni-Tsipane (ANC)
- Deputy Chairperson: Les Govender (IFP)
- Leader of the Opposition: Kenny Mmoiemang

The 28th South African Parliament is the seventh Parliament of South Africa to convene since the introduction of non-racial government in South Africa in 1994. It was elected in the general election of 29 May 2024 and consists of the National Assembly and the National Council of Provinces. The National Assembly contains 400 members, while the National Council of Provinces contains 90 members.

Members of Parliament were sworn in on 14 June 2024. The 28th Parliament first convened on 14 June 2024 to re-elect Cyril Ramaphosa as President of South Africa.

== Leadership ==
On 10 June, Chief Justice Raymond Zondo declared that the first sitting of the new National Assembly would occur on 14 June, during which elections for parliamentary speaker and president would be held. The session proceeded as scheduled, with the ANC's Thoko Didiza being elected parliamentary speaker after she defeated the Economic Freedom Fighters' Veronica Mente with 284 votes to 49. The same day, the National Assembly would re-elect Ramaphosa President of South Africa after he defeated Economic Freedom Fighters leader Julius Malema with 283 votes to 44. The DA's Annelie Lotriet was elected Deputy Speaker after defeating the African Transformation Movement's Vuyo Zungula with 273 votes to 54. Lotriet became the first non-ANC member to hold the position of Deputy Speaker of the National Assembly since Bhadra Ranchod, who served as Deputy Speaker between 1994 and 1996.

=== National Assembly ===
- President: Cyril Ramaphosa, ANC
- Deputy President: Paul Mashatile, ANC
- Speaker: Thoko Didiza, ANC
- Deputy Speaker: Annelie Lotriet, DA
- House Chairperson: Cedric Frolick, ANC
- House Chairperson: Werner Horn, DA
- House Chairperson: Zandile Majozi, IFP
- Chairperson of Committees -
- Leader of Government Business -
- Government Chief Whip - Mdumiseni Ntuli, ANC
- Deputy Government Chief Whip -
- Leader of the Opposition - John Hlophe
- Official Opposition Chief Whip -

=== National Council of Provinces ===
- Chairperson - Refilwe Mtsweni-Tsipane, ANC
- Deputy Chairperson - Les Govender, IFP
- House Chairperson: Committees - Dennis Ryder, DA
- House Chairperson: Members Support and International Relations - Bheki Radebe, ANC
- Government Chief Whip - Kenny Mmoiemang, ANC
- Government Programming Whip - Kolobe Regina Molokomme, ANC
- Leader of the Opposition -
