= Luwellyn Landers =

South African politician (died 2023)

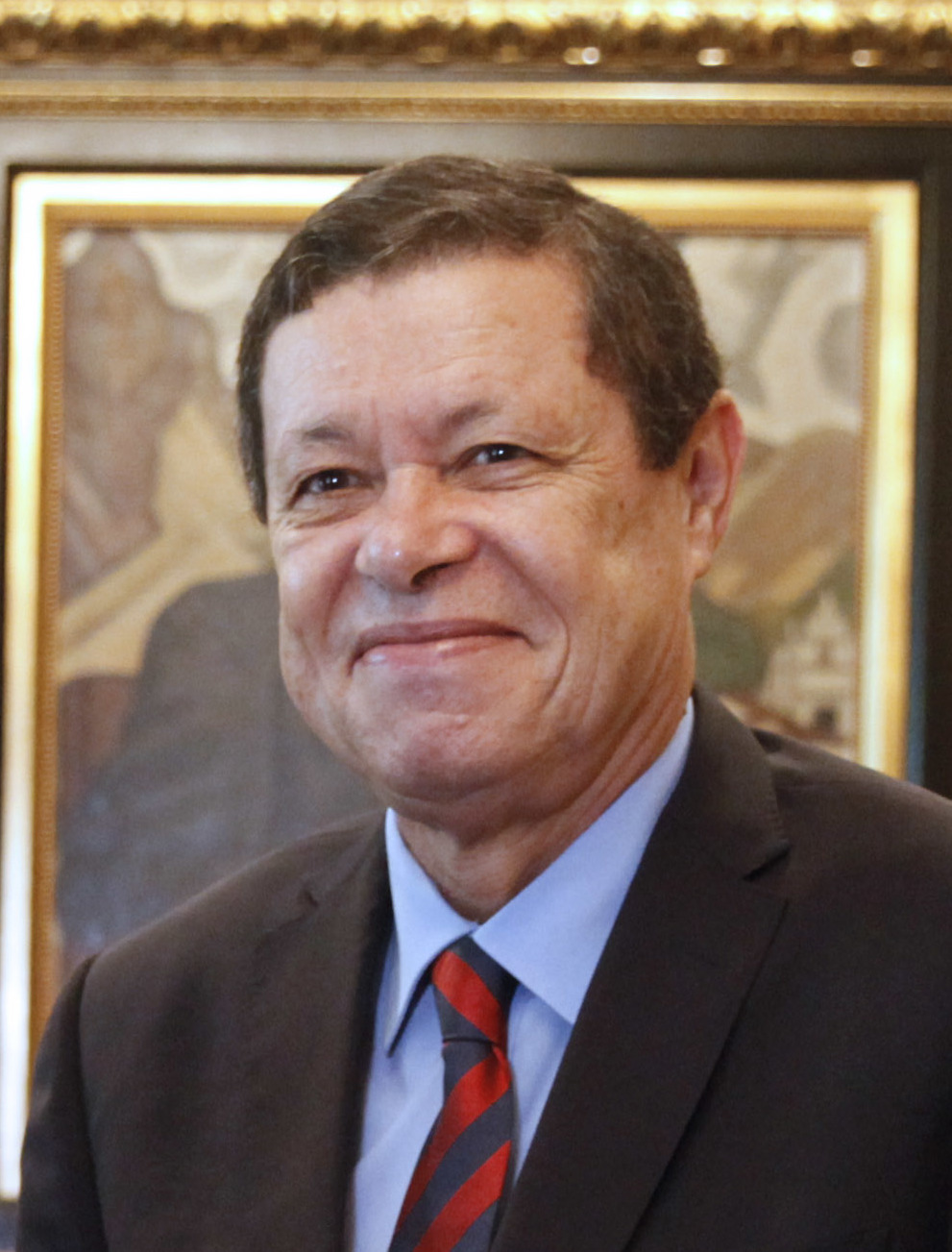
- Landers in March 2017

Deputy Minister of International Relations and Cooperation
- In office 26 May 2014 – 7 May 2019 Serving with Nomaindia Mfeketo and Reginah Mhaule
- President: Jacob Zuma; Cyril Ramaphosa
- Minister: Maite Nkoana-Mashabane; Lindiwe Sisulu
- Preceded by: Marius Fransman; Ebrahim Ebrahim
- Succeeded by: Alvin Botes; Candith Mashego-Dlamini

Member of the National Assembly
- In office 9 May 1994 – 7 May 2019

Chairperson of the Portfolio Committee on Justice and Constitutional Development
- In office 2010–2014
- Preceded by: Ngoako Ramatlhodi
- Succeeded by: Mathole Motshekga

Chairperson of the Joint Committee on Ethics and Members' Interests
- In office 2002–2010 Serving with Buoang Mashile (since 2009)
- Preceded by: Sister Bernard Ncube
- Succeeded by: Ben Turok

Personal details
- Born: Luwellyn Tyrone Landers; 28 December 1947 Natal, Union of South Africa
- Died: November 2023 (aged 75)
- Party: African National Congress (since September 1993)
- Other political affiliations: Labour Party (1984–1993)
- Education: University of South Africa

Luwellyn Tyrone Landers (28 December 1947 – November 2023) was a South African politician who was the Deputy Minister of International Relations and Cooperation between May 2014 and May 2019. He represented the African National Congress (ANC) in the National Assembly of South Africa from May 1994 to May 2019.

Born in Natal Province, Landers represented the Labour Party in the apartheid-era Tricameral Parliament. He also served as a deputy minister in the government of President P. W. Botha. In September 1993, he defected to the ANC, and he was elected to an ANC seat in the post-apartheid Parliament in 1994.

Before he joined the national executive in 2014, Landers was the second chairperson of the Joint Committee on Ethics and Members' Interests between 2002 and 2010 and the fourth chairperson of the Portfolio Committee on Justice and Constitutional Development between 2010 and 2014.

== Early life and career ==
Born on 28 December 1947, Landers was born and raised on his grandfather's farm in the former Natal Province (now KwaZulu-Natal). He attended the University of South Africa.

In 1984 Landers joined the Labour Party. He represented the party in the House of Representatives, the Coloured house of the apartheid-era Tricameral Parliament, and he also served as a deputy minister in the cabinet of President P. W. Botha of the National Party. He left the Labour Party in September 1993, becoming one of several party leaders to defect to the African National Congress (ANC) ahead of the 1994 general election.

== Ordinary Member of the National Assembly: 1994–2014 ==
In the democratic elections of April 1994, Landers was elected to represent the ANC in the National Assembly, the lower house of the new South African Parliament. He remained in his seat for the next 25 years, gaining re-election to five consecutive terms. During the First Parliament he was a founding member of the Joint Standing Committee on Intelligence and the Portfolio Committee on Justice.

=== Ethics committee ===
In 2002, Landers replaced Sister Bernard Ncube as the chairman of the Joint Committee on Ethics and Members' Interests. He led the committee during its inquiries into the conduct of Terror Lekota and Winnie Madikizela-Mandela. In late 2003 Richard Calland noted critically that under Landers the committee's "new default position" was to meet in closed session; he suggested that Landers's approach might have been negatively influenced by his time in the secretive intelligence committee. He continued to serve in the chair during the Third Parliament, nominated to continue by the ANC after the 2004 general election and formally re-elected as chairman at a meeting in June 2004. During this time he was also a member of the ANC's internal National Disciplinary Committee, and he was a member of the panel that expelled chief whip Mbulelo Goniwe from the party in December 2006.

After the 2009 general election, Landers was elected to his third term as chairman of the parliamentary ethics committee. In terms of new parliamentary rules, he served alongside a new co-chairman from the upper house of Parliament, the National Council of Provinces; Buoang Mashile was elected to that role at the committee's first meeting in August 2009.

=== Justice committee ===
In November 2010, the ANC announced a major reshuffle of the parliamentary caucus, in which Landers was nominated to succeed Ngoako Ramatlhodi as chairman of the justice committee, by then renamed the Portfolio Committee on Justice and Constitutional Development. He had remained an ordinary member of that committee since its establishment.

Landers led the justice committee for the rest of the Fourth Parliament. During that time, he was also a prominent member of the ad hoc committee established to process the Protection of State Information Bill, 2010, the controversial piece of legislation best known as the Secrecy Bill. Along with ad hoc committee chairman Cecil Burgess, Landers was viewed as a primary advocate of the bill, tasked by the ANC with presenting the party's arguments for the bill in committee. After the Secrecy Bill was passed, Landers was one of seven ANC representatives nominated to serve on the ad hoc committee that would consider the Public Protector's report on Nkandlagate. He was also a member of the ad hoc committee on the judicial conduct code, and he was attached to the ANC's constituency office in Pinetown South, KwaZulu-Natal.

== Deputy Minister of International Relations and Cooperation: 2014–2019 ==
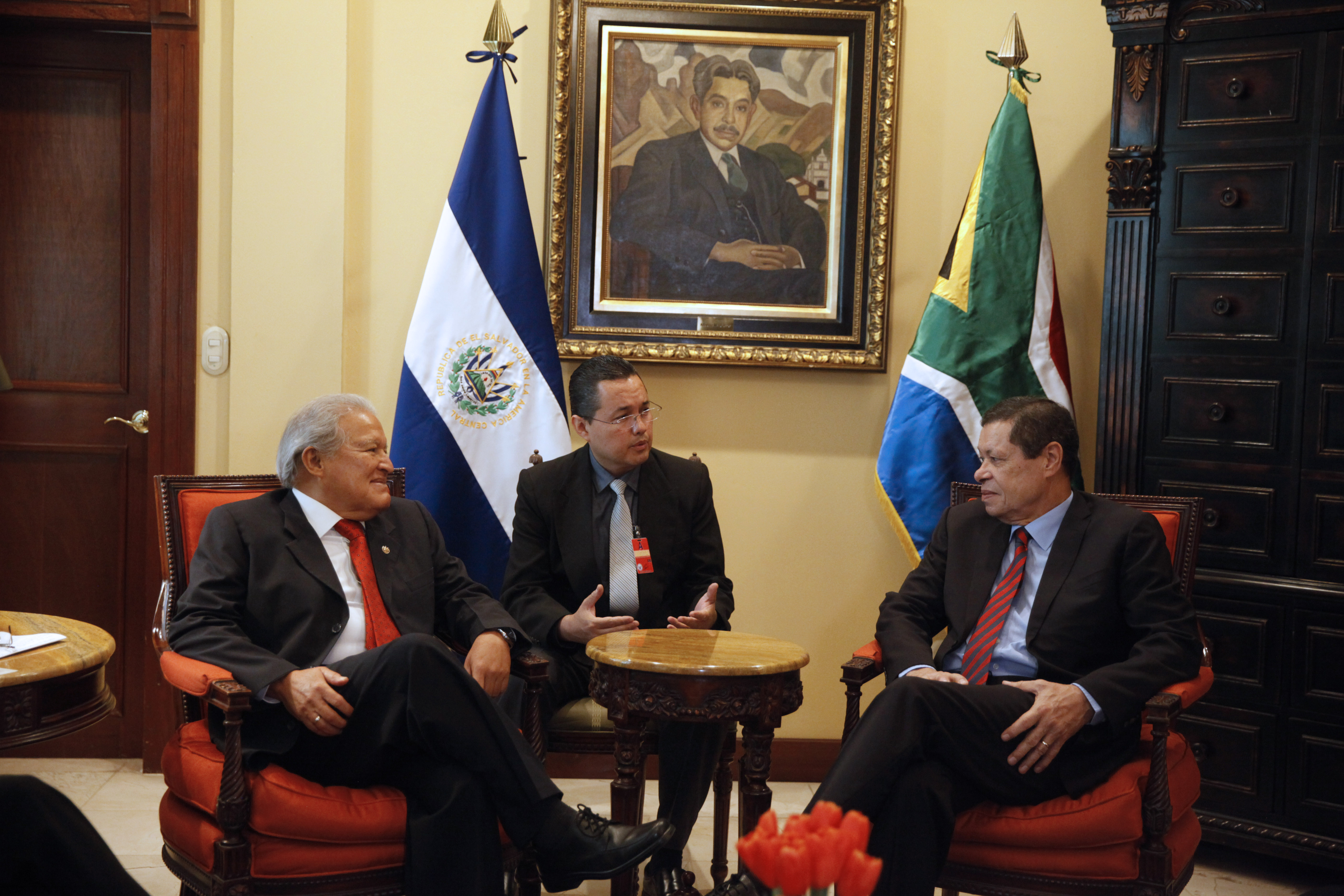
Landers (right) meeting with Salvador Sánchez Cerén, President of El Salvador, 31 March 2017

On 25 May 2014, announcing his second-term cabinet, President Jacob Zuma named Landers as Deputy Minister of International Relations and Cooperation. He was one of two deputy ministers in the portfolio, the other being Nomaindia Mfeketo, and both deputised Minister Maite Nkoana-Mashabane.

In a midterm presidential election in February 2018, Cyril Ramaphosa replaced Zuma as president, and in his new cabinet he fired both Minister Nkoana-Mashabane and Deputy Minister Mfeketo. However, Ramaphosa retained Landers as deputy minister, now serving alongside Reginah Mhaule and under Lindiwe Sisulu. Indeed, Landers represented South Africa at the United Nations Human Rights Council later in February 2018.

In the next general election in May 2019, Landers ceded his seat in the National Assembly.

== Death ==
On 25 November 2023, the Department of International Relations and Cooperation announced that Landers had died. A spokesman said that the circumstances of his death were not clear.
