= Humphrey Maxegwana =

South African politician

Chairperson of the Joint Committee on Ethics and Members' Interests
- In office 25 October 2018 – 7 May 2019 Serving with Omie Singh
- Preceded by: Amos Masondo
- Succeeded by: Bekizwe Nkosi

Member of the National Assembly
- In office 21 May 2014 – 7 May 2019

Personal details
- Citizenship: South Africa
- Party: African National Congress

Comely Humphrey Maqocwa Maxegwana is a South African politician who represented the African National Congress (ANC) in the National Assembly from 2014 to 2019, when he failed to gain re--election. Before that, he represented the ANC in the Eastern Cape Provincial Legislature. He was a prominent trade unionist in the Eastern Cape during apartheid and is also a former Provincial Secretary of the ANC's Eastern Cape branch.

== Apartheid-era activism ==
After matriculating in 1974, Maxegwana was active in the South African Students' Movement and, from 1977, the Black People's Convention, both anti-apartheid organisations affiliated to the Black Consciousness movement. In 1977, he was recruited to the South African Congress of Trade Unions (SACTU); he was an underground operative for SACTU in East London and later worked closely with the South African Allied Workers' Union. SACTU sent him abroad in 1985.

== Provincial legislature ==
After the end of apartheid, Maxegwana represented the ANC in the Eastern Cape Provincial Legislature. He was Provincial Secretary of the ANC's Eastern Cape branch, serving under Provincial Chairperson Makhenkesi Stofile, from 1996 until 2006, when he was replaced by Siphatho Handi. He also served as Majority Party Chief Whip in the legislature until August 2013, when the ANC removed him in line with a party resolution that all Chief Whips should be selected from among members of the party's internal Provincial Executive Committees; he was replaced by Mzoleli Mrara.

== National Assembly ==
In the 2014 general election, Maxegwana did not stand for re-election to the provincial legislature but instead was elected to a seat in the National Assembly, the lower house of the South African Parliament; he was ranked tenth on the ANC's provincial-to-national party list for the Eastern Cape. In May 2016, the ANC announced that he would additionally serve as Chairperson of the Portfolio Committee on Communications and Digital Technologies, replacing Joyce Moloi-Moropa, who had resigned from Parliament. He departed that position in late October 2018, when the ANC nominated him to replace Amos Masondo as co-chairperson of the Joint Committee on Ethics and Members' Interests. In the 2019 general election, he was ranked 166th on the ANC's national party list and was not re-elected to his legislative seat.

== Local government ==
In July 2020, Maxegwana was elected to succeed Alfred Mtsi as Speaker of the Buffalo City Metropolitan Municipality council; he received 54 votes against the 22 votes received by the opposition candidate, the Democratic Alliance's Geoffrey Walton. After the local elections of November 2021, IOL reported that Maxegwana was one of three leading contenders for the position of Mayor of Buffalo City. He was not ultimately elected to the mayoral office but remained in office as Speaker.
