= Nombulelo =

Nombulelo (Mbulelo male) is a feminine South African given name derived from the Xhosa word bulela, meaning "gratitude". Notable people with the given name include:

- Nombulelo Hermans (1970–2021), South African politician
- Nombulelo Mabandla (died 2011), South African politician
- Nombulelo Mhlongo (born 1992), South African actress
