= Itumeleng Ntsube =

South African politician

Itumeleng Ntsube MP

Permanent delegate to the National Council of Provinces from the Free State
- Incumbent
- Assumed office 23 May 2019

Personal details
- Born: Itumeleng Ntsube; 9 September 1998 (age 27) Botshabelo, Free State, South Africa
- Party: African National Congress
- Occupation: Member of Parliament
- Profession: Politician

Itumeleng Ntsube (born 9 September 1998) is a South African politician serving as a permanent delegate to the National Council of Provinces from the Free State. He was sworn in as a Member of Parliament at the age of 20 in May 2019 and consequently became the youngest parliamentarian in South African history. Ntsube is a member of the African National Congress (ANC) and the president of Congress of South African Students (Cosas).

Ntsube was born in Botshabelo in the Free State. He matriculated from high school in 2018. He is currently studying towards a degree in education.
