= Sister Bernard Ncube =

South African politician (1935–2012)

Chairperson of the Joint Committee on Ethics and Members' Interest
- In office 1999–2002
- Deputy: Lawrence Mushwana
- Preceded by: Committee established
- Succeeded by: Luwellyn Landers

Member of the National Assembly
- In office 1994–2002

Personal details
- Born: Neikie Zellie Ncube; 9 March 1935 East Rand, Transvaal; Union of South Africa
- Died: 31 August 2012 (aged 77)
- Party: African National Congress

Sister Mary Bernard Ncube (née Neikie Zellie Ncube; 9 March 1935 – August 31, 2012) was a South African religious sister and anti-apartheid activist. As a religious sister, she often faced criticism from the church over her politics, including her stance on abortion. Because of her anti-apartheid activities, she was often arrested and is probably the first sister to be arrested in South Africa.

== Early life and education ==
Ncube was born on 9 March 1935 on the East Rand of the former Transvaal. She earned a degree in theology from the Roma College in Lesotho and entered the Companions Catholic Order in 1955. She worked as a teacher until 1960.

== Apartheid-era activism ==
Ncube lived at the St. Mary's Convent in Kagiso where she was known around the community as Mma Rona (Our Mother). Ncube helped establish the Federation of Transvaal Women (FEDTRAW). Previously, she had been very active with youth groups in Kagiso. In 1984, she became the president of FEDTRAW.

In 1983, she was arrested and sentenced to four months in prison for possessing "banned literature." The item in her possession was a pamphlet published by the African National Congress (ANC), which had been outlawed in South Africa.

In 1986, Ncube was arrested for attending a United Democratic Front (UDF) gathering, and was later let out on a $200 bail on the charge of attending an illegal gathering. Not long after, police with dogs raided her convent and took over 70 documents, many relating to the UDF. In March 1986, a gasoline bomb was tossed into her convent room, fortunately not harming anyone. Later that year, in June, she was detained again and held in solitary confinement for over a year under Section 29 of the Internal Security Act. During much of that time, she did not have access to necessary medical supplies or the type of special diet she needed. Eventually she was released on bail. Ncube was banned from Kagiso in 1987. On March 17, 1988, the government dropped the charges against her.

In 1989, she was part of a UDF delegation to meet with President George Bush. Ncube went a "nation-wide speaking tour" of the United States and sponsored by Global Exchange in 1990. In 1991, she joined the National Executive Committee of the ANC.

== Post-apartheid career ==
Ncube was elected into Parliament in 1994 and chaired the portfolio committee on arts and culture. She left Parliament in 2002, when she became the mayor of the West Rand Municipality. She died on 31 August 2012.

== See also ==
- List of people subject to banning orders under apartheid
