= Z. K. Matthews =

Bamangwato academic in South Africa (1901–1968)

ZK Matthews
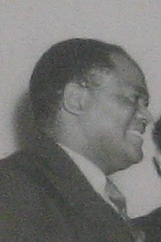
- Born: Zachariah Keodirelang Matthews; 20 October 1901; Winter's Rush, Cape Colony
- Died: 11 May 1968 (aged 66); Washington, DC
- Education: University of South Africa; Yale University; London School of Economics
- Children: Joe Matthews
- Scientific career
- Fields: Social Anthropology and Custom Law
- Workplaces: University of Fort Hare
- Doctoral advisor: Bronisław Malinowski
- Notable students: Mangosuthu Buthelezi; Seretse Khama; Nelson Mandela; Charles Njonjo; Oliver Tambo

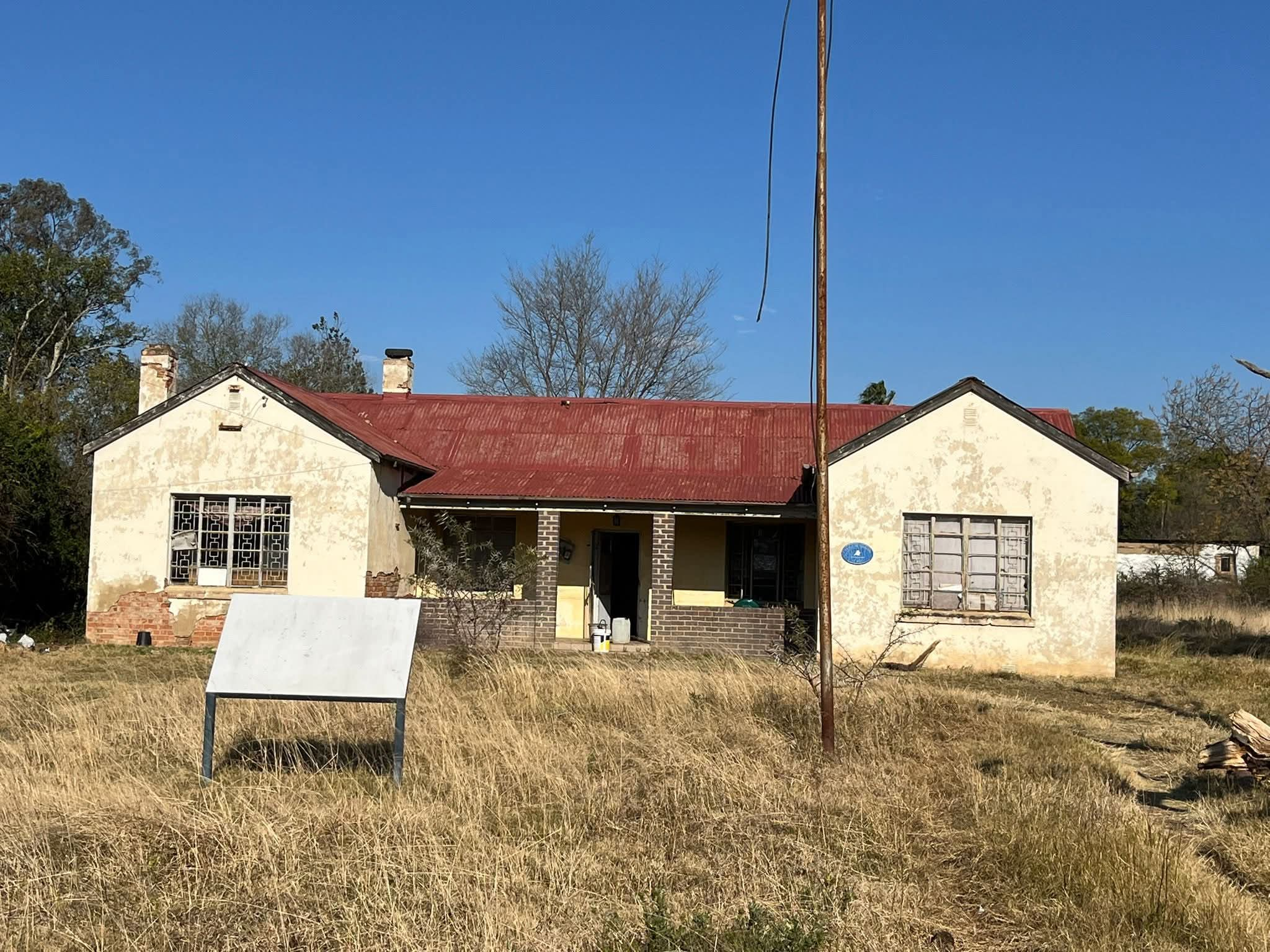
The house of Prof. Z.K Mathews in Alice,Eastern Cape, South Africa, where he lived in the 1950's

Zachariah Keodirelang Matthews OLG (20 October 1901 – 11 May 1968) was a prominent black academic in South Africa, lecturing at South African Native College (renamed University of Fort Hare in 1955). Many future leaders of the African continent were among his students.

== Life ==
=== Early years ===
Z.K. Matthews was born in Winter's Rush near Kimberley in 1901, the son of a Bamangwato mineworker. Z.K. grew up in urban Kimberley, but maintained close connections with his mother's rural Barolong relatives. He went to Mission high school in the eastern Cape where he attended Lovedale. After Lovedale he studied at South African Native College in Fort Hare. In 1923 he wrote the external examination of the University of South Africa.

In 1924, he was appointed head of the high school at Adams College in Natal. Albert Luthuli was also a teacher here. The two men attended meetings of the Durban Joint Council and held office in the Natal Teacher's Association, of which Matthews eventually was elected president.

While in Natal, in 1928, he married Frieda Bokwe, daughter of John Knox Bokwe and his wife. He had met her as a student at Fort Hare. Their son, Joe, was born in 1929 in Durban. He later became a prominent politician.

In 1930, after private study, Matthews earned an LLB degree in South Africa, awarded by the University of South Africa. He was admitted to the bar as an attorney and practiced for a short time in Alice, Eastern Cape. In 1933, he was invited to study at Yale University in the United States. There in the following year he completed an MA. He then studied at the London School of Economics, pursuing anthropology under Bronisław Malinowski.

He returned to South Africa in 1935. In 1936 he was appointed Lecturer in Social Anthropology and Native Law and Administration at University of Fort Hare. After Davidson Don Tengo Jabavu's retirement in 1944, Matthews was promoted to Professor and became head of Fort Hare's Department of African Studies.

=== Political activism ===
Matthews did not confine himself to an academic career. He combined his study of anthropology and the law with an active political involvement. He found his true political home in the ANC. He had attended meetings as a boy in the company of Sol Plaatje, a senior relative. He did not become a member until 1940. In 1943, he was elected to the National Executive Committee. At the time he also became a member of the Native Representative Council, a purely advisory body that has been condemned as a "toy telephone". Matthews found his participation on it to be frustrating, although he found dealing with the Native Education Act of 1945 to be a "valuable experience" for the people he met. In June 1949, Matthews succeeded James Calata as ANC provincial president in the Cape.

In June 1952, on the eve of the Defiance Campaign, he left South Africa for a position as visiting professor at New York's Union Theological Seminary.

He returned home in May 1953. Although he did not attend the Congress of the People in 1955, he assisted Lionel "Rusty" Bernstein in drawing up the Freedom Charter that was adopted there. Denis Goldberg credits Matthews with having been one of the driving forces behind the proposal for gathering and documenting the wishes of the people for the Charter.

Matthews was arrested in December 1956, and was one of the accused in the Treason Trial. On his release from the trial in late 1958, he returned to Fort Hare. He resigned his post in protest against the passage of legislation that reduced the university to a status of an ethnic college for the Xhosa community only.

In 1961, Matthews moved to Geneva, Switzerland after being selected as secretary of the Africa division of the World Council of Churches.

In 1966, he accepted the post of ambassador to the United States for the newly independent nation of Botswana. He died in the capital Washington, DC on 11 May 1968.

== Selected publications ==
- A New Native Teachers' Course, Ilanga lase Natal, November 4, 11, 1927
- Bantu Law and Western Civilisation in South Africa: A Study in the Clash of Cultures Yale University, 1934. Master of Arts thesis.
- A Short History of the Tshidi Barolong, Fort Hare Papers, vol. 1 no. 1, June 1945
- Foreword, in Responsible Government in a Revolutionary Age, [ed.] Z. K. Matthews, Association Press, New York, 1966.
- Freedom For My People, Cape Town: Collings, 1981. (Published posthumously in 1981)
- Africa holds her own. An appreciation of Bantu tribal and national culture in the Imperial Protectorates and in the Union of South Africa. By W. Bryant Mumford, in co-operation with Hugh Ashton and Z. K. Matthews.
- African awakening and the universities, Cape Town University of Cape Town, 1961.

== See also ==
- Joe Matthews
- Naledi Pandor
- Temba Maqubela
