= Mzamo Billy =

South African politician

Mzamo Billy MP

Permanent Delegate to the National Council of Provinces from KwaZulu-Natal
- Incumbent
- Assumed office 15 June 2024

Personal details
- Born: 1988 or 1989 (age 37–38)
- Party: Democratic Alliance
- Education: University of KwaZulu-Natal (BA(Hons))
- Profession: Politician

Mzambo Billy (born 1988 or 1989) is a South African politician who has represented KwaZulu-Natal in the National Council of Provinces as a member of the Democratic Alliance since 2024.

== Background ==
Billy obtained an honours degree in International Relations from the University of KwaZulu-Natal.

In 2019, Billy became a Democratic Alliance proportional representation (PR) councillor in the eThekwini Metropolitan Municipality. He was elected as the deputy leader of the DA caucus in the metro following the 2021 local government elections.

== Parliamentary career ==
Following the 2024 general election, Billy was elected to represent KwaZulu-Natal in the National Council of Provinces, the upper house of the South African parliament, as a member of the DA. He was appointed whip of the provincial delegation shortly afterwards.
