= Audrey Maleka =

South African politician

Audrey Dimakatso Maleka is a South African politician from the African National Congress. She has represented Mpumalanga in the National Council of Provinces since 2019.

== See also ==
- List of National Council of Provinces members of the 27th Parliament of South Africa
