= Eric Landsman =

South African politician

Eric Landsman MP

Permanent Delegate to the National Council of Provinces
- Incumbent
- Assumed office 23 May 2019

Personal details
- Born: Eric Riaan Landsman
- Party: African National Congress

Eric Riaan Landsman is a South African politician who has served as a Permanent Delegate to the National Council of Provinces from the North West since May 2019. Landsman is a member of the African National Congress.

== Education ==
Landsman holds a qualification in Micro Planning in Rural Development from the National Institute of Rural Development, a certificate in management from North-West University, and a Municipal Governance and Policy Legislation Certificate from the South African Local Government Association. According to his parliamentary profile, he also completed a Junior Youth Leaders Course.

== Political career ==
Landsman had formerly served as the regional treasurer of the African National Congress structure in the Ngaka Modiri Molema District Municipality. He served as an ANC councillor of the Ngaka Modiri Molema District Council where he served in the mayoral committee and was chief whip of the council. He has also served as chairperson of the branch executive committee of the ANC's Saamwerk branch and as a member of the regional executive committee of the ANC in the Ngaka Modiri Molema district.

== Parliamentary career ==
Landsman unsuccessfully stood for election to the North West Provincial Legislature as last on the ANC list in the 2019 general elections, however, he was elected to the National Council of Provinces as an ANC delegate from the North West by the North West Provincial Legislature. He was sworn into office during the first sitting of the newly constituted NCOP on 23 May 2019.

Landsman serves on multiple committees, including the Select Committee on Land Reform, Environment, Mineral Resources and Energy, the Select Committee on Public Enterprises and Communication, the Select Committee on Transport, Public Service and Administration, Public Works and Infrastructure and the Select Committee on Trade and Industry, Economic Development, Small Business Development, Tourism, Employment and Labour.
