= Rikus Badenhorst =

South African politician

Rikus Badenhorst MP

Permanent Delegate to the National Council of Provinces
- Incumbent
- Assumed office 1 December 2022

Personal details
- Party: Democratic Alliance
- Profession: Politician

Frederik Jacobus Badenhorst is a South African politician who has served in the National Council of Provinces as a Western Cape permanent delegate for the Democratic Alliance since December 2022. He was previously the ward councillor for ward 21 and a Member of the Mayoral Committee in the Stellenbosch Local Municipality.
