= Jacobus Frederick van Wyk =

South African politician (1952–2021)

Speaker of the Northern Cape Provincial Legislature
- In office September 2009 – May 2013
- Premier: Hazel Jenkins
- Preceded by: Goolam Akharwaray
- Succeeded by: Kenny Mmoiemang

Member of the Northern Cape Provincial Legislature
- In office 2004–2013
- Succeeded by: Gail Parker

Member of the National Assembly of South Africa
- In office 1997–2004

Personal details
- Born: Jacobus Frederick van Wyk; 28 July 1952 Steinkopf, Cape Province, South Africa
- Died: 31 July 2021 (aged 69) Steinkopf, Northern Cape, South Africa
- Party: African National Congress
- Spouse: Romina (Until 2021; his death)
- Children: 3
- Education: Steinkopf Secondary School
- Alma mater: University of South Africa; University of Cape Town; University of the Witwatersrand
- Profession: Educator

Jacobus Frederick van Wyk (28 July 1952 – 31 July 2021), also sometimes referred to as Boeboe van Wyk, was a South African politician who was a member of the National Assembly from 1997 to 2004, member of the Executive Council in the Northern Cape government from 2004 to 2009, member of the Northern Cape Provincial Legislature from 2004 to 2013, speaker of the provincial legislature from 2009 to 2013, and mayor of the Nama Khoi Local Municipality from 2013 to 2016. Van Wyk was a member of the African National Congress.

== Early life and education ==
Van Wyk was born in Steinkopf in the former Cape Province. He attended Steinkopf Secondary School. After matric, he went on to become a teacher at the school for 29 years. Van Wyk completed six courses for a bachelor's degree at the University of South Africa as well as several courses in organisation and development management at the University of Cape Town and the University of the Witwatersrand.

== Political career ==
Van Wyk was active in the South African Council of Sports and a land activist in the Namaqua district. He worked as a field worker for the Surplus People Project from 1994 to 1997. In 1997, Van Wyk was elected as a Member of Parliament to the National Assembly as a member of the African National Congress. He was elected to a full term in parliament in 1999. He served as chairperson of the National Assembly's Portfolio Committee on Water Affairs and Forestry during his time as an MP.

Van Wyk was elected as a member of the Northern Cape Provincial Legislature in the 2004 provincial election. He was first appointed the Member of the Executive Council for Safety and Liaison, before being appointed MEC for Housing and Local Government. Van Wyk later became MEC for Health. Following the May 2009 provincial election, he was appointed chief whip of the ANC caucus in the provincial legislature and became chief whip of the majority party. He later became speaker of the provincial legislature in September 2009.

In May 2013, Van Wyk resigned as speaker and member of the provincial legislature (MPL) to take up the position of mayor of the Nama Khoi Local Municipality. He left office before the 3 August 2016 municipal elections.

Van Wyk also served on the provincial executive committee of the ANC. He served the ANC in multiple positions. He was a trustee of multiple community organisations, including the Namaqualand Diamond Fund Trust.

== Personal life and death ==
Van Wyk was married to Romina. He had three daughters, Rowina, Celeste and Elizabeth.

Van Wyk died from COVID-19 related complications on 31 July 2021, in Steinkopf during the COVID-19 pandemic in South Africa. He died shortly after his older sister also died from COVID-19 related complications.
