= Makhi Feni =

South African politician (born 1978)

The Honourable Makhi Feni MP

Delegate to the National Council of Provinces

Assembly Member for Eastern Cape
- Incumbent
- Assumed office 15 June 2024

Member of the Eastern Cape Provincial Legislature
- In office 31 May 2023 – 28 May 2024

Personal details
- Born: 1 April 1978 (age 48)
- Citizenship: South African
- Party: African National Congress
- Other political affiliations: South African Communist Party

Makhi Feni (born 1 April 1978) is a South African politician from the Eastern Cape. He has represented the African National Congress in the National Council of Provinces since June 2024. He is the chairperson of the Select Committee on Education, Sciences and Creative Industries.

Feni served in the Eastern Cape Provincial Legislature from May 2023 to May 2024, and before that he was a local councillor in the Nelson Mandela Bay Metropolitan Municipality.

== Nelson Mandela Bay ==
Feni began his political career in the Nelson Mandela Bay Metropolitan Municipality in the Eastern Cape, where he represented the African National Congress (ANC) as a local councillor. He was also active in the local South African Communist Party. In August 2018, when the ANC succeeded in taking over the leadership of the Nelson Mandela Bay council, Feni was appointed to the coalition mayoral committee of newly elected mayor Mongameli Bobani, who named him as Member of the Mayoral Committee (MMC) for Corporate Services. He lost that position when the opposition Democratic Alliance (DA) regained control of the council.

However, pursuant to the November 2021 local elections, Feni returned to his position as MMC for Corporate Services in a new coalition government under ANC mayor Eugene Johnson. Feni had been a prominent figure in the ANC's preparations for the elections; he had reportedly come to physical blows with Andile Mfunda in a dispute over his handling of the ANC's candidate selection process, and with Johnson he was a considered a frontrunner for the mayoral seat.

Johnson's government collapsed after less than a year, in September 2022, and Annette Lovemore replaced Feni as MMC in the DA's new government.

== Eastern Cape Provincial Legislature ==
In late May 2023, Feni resigned from the Nelson Mandela Bay council, ceding his seat to Babalwa Lobishe, who became the municipality's deputy mayor when the ANC launched a new governing coalition the following week. On 31 May 2023, Feni was sworn in to Lobishe's seat in the Eastern Cape Provincial Legislature. He served in the legislature until the next general election in May 2024.

== National Council of Provinces ==
Pursuant to the 2024 general election, Feni was elected to represent the ANC in the Eastern Cape caucus of the National Council of Provinces, the upper house of the South African Parliament. With Patrick Mabilo and Sylvia Nxumalo, he was one of three members whom the council designated to serve on the Magistrates Commission as a parliamentary representative. He was also appointed as a member of the Select Committee on Social Services and Select Committee on Education, Sciences and Creative Industries, and on 11 July 2024 he was elected unopposed as chairperson of the latter committee.
