= Joe Matthews (politician) =

South African activist and politician

Deputy Minister of Safety and Security
- In office 1994–2004
- President: Nelson Mandela
- Minister: Sydney Mufamadi

Personal details
- Born: 17 June 1929 Durban, South Africa
- Died: 19 August 2010 (aged 81) Johannesburg, South Africa
- Party: Inkatha Freedom Party
- Relations: Z. K. Matthews (father)
- Children: Naledi Pandor
- Education: University of Fort Hare, University of London
- Occupation: Lawyer and Politician

Vincent Joseph Gaobakwe Matthews (17 June 1929 – 19 August 2010) was a South African activist and politician.

Matthews was the son of Z. K. Matthews, an early leader of the African National Congress (ANC). He was born on 17 June 1929 in the port city of Durban. Matthews completed his primary education at Lovedale Mission Station in the Eastern Cape while his father was a lecturer at the nearby University of Fort Hare. At the age of 15, he joined the African National Congress Youth League in 1944. Matthews matriculated in Johannesburg in 1947 and earned a BA from the University of Fort Hare in 1952 and an LL.B. from the University of London in the United Kingdom in 1956. Both he and his father were charged with treason in 1956 along with 154 other anti-apartheid activists, all of whom including the Matthews, were acquitted. He passed the advocates' admission exam in 1957 and became an attorney of the Supreme Court a year later. In 1960, he set up a practice in Durban before moving to neighboring Lesotho. While in exile due to apartheid policies in South Africa, Matthews became an assistant Attorney General of neighboring Botswana. From 1986 to 1991, Matthews lived in the Netherlands. He returned to South Africa a year later. He was active with the African National Congress from 1944 to 1992, when he left it to join the opposition Inkatha Freedom Party.

Matthews was a member of the Parliament of South Africa with the Inkatha Freedom Party from the first democratic elections in 1994 until the 2004 elections, when he chose not to stand. During the Government of National Unity period from 1994 to 1999, he was the Deputy Minister of Safety and Security, while the ANC's Sydney Mufamadi was head of the ministry.

Matthews died on 19 August 2010 at the Milpark Hospital in Johannesburg.

== See also ==
- List of people subject to banning orders under apartheid
