= Mathapelo Siwisa =

South African politician

Mathapelo Siwisa MP

Permanent Delegate to the National Council of Provinces from the Northern Cape
- Incumbent
- Assumed office 15 June 2024

Member of the National Assembly of South Africa
- In office 22 May 2019 – 28 May 2024

Personal details
- Party: Economic Freedom Fighters
- Profession: Politician

Annacleta Mathapelo Siwisa is a South African politician who served as a Member of the National Assembly of South Africa for the Economic Freedom Fighters. She was elected to parliament in 2019.

In the National Assembly, Siwisa was a member of the Portfolio Committee on Public Works and Infrastructure.

Siwisa was not re-elected to the National Assembly at the 2024 general election. She was, however, selected to take up a seat in the National Council of Provinces, the upper house of the South African parliament.
