= Betta Lehihi =

South African politician

Betta Lehihi MP

Permanent delegate to the National Council of Provinces from the North West
- Incumbent
- Assumed office 23 May 2019

Personal details
- Born: Seneanye Betta Lehihi
- Party: Economic Freedom Fighters
- Occupation: Member of Parliament
- Profession: Politician

Seneanye Betta Lehihi is a South African politician who has been representing the North West in the National Council of Provinces since May 2019. Lehihi is a member of the Economic Freedom Fighters.

== Education ==
Lehihi completed grade 11 at the Tiragalo Secondary School in Leeudoringstad, North West.

== Parliamentary career ==
Lehihi is a member of the Economic Freedom Fighters. After the general election on 8 May 2019, she was elected as a permanent delegate to the National Council of Provinces. She was sworn in as an MP on 23 May 2019. Lehihi is the sole EFF representative in the North West delegation. She received her committee assignments on 24 June.

=== Committee assignments ===
- Joint Constitutional Review Committee
- Select Committee on Education and Technology, Sports, Arts and Culture
- Select Committee on Health and Social Services
- Select Committee on Land Reform, Environment, Mineral Resources and Energy
- Select Committee on Public Enterprises and Communication
