= Khanya Ceza =

South African politician

Khanya Ceza MP

Permanent Delegate to the National Council of Provinces from Mpumalanga
- Incumbent
- Assumed office 15 June 2024

Member of the National Assembly of South Africa
- In office 22 May 2019 – 28 May 2024

Personal details
- Born: Khanya Ceza
- Party: Economic Freedom Fighters

Khanya Ceza is a South African politician of the Economic Freedom Fighters (EFF) who has been serving as a Permanent Delegate to the National Council of Provinces since 2024. He served as a Member of the National Assembly of South Africa from 2019 until 2024. In the National Assembly, he sat as alternate member of the Portfolio Committee on Cooperative Governance and Traditional Affairs.
