= S'lindile Luthuli =

South African politician

S'lindile Luthuli MP

Permanent Delegate to the National Council of Provinces

Assembly Member for KwaZulu-Natal
- In office 23 May 2019 – 12 March 2024

Personal details
- Party: Economic Freedom Fighters

S'lindile Ann Luthuli is a South African politician from KwaZulu-Natal. A member of the Economic Freedom Fighters (EFF), she has represented KwaZulu-Natal in the National Council of Provinces from 2019 until 2024.

== Political career ==
From 2006 to 2010, Luthuli was a local councillor in Ndwedwe Local Municipality, where she was also deputy mayor; she represented the National Democratic Convention. After joining the EFF, she served as the party's regional coordinator in the Ilembe region from 2017 to 2018; in 2018, she was elected to the EFF Provincial Command Team in KwaZulu-Natal.

In the 2019 general election, Luthuli stood as an EFF candidate for election to the KwaZulu-Natal Provincial Legislature. Though she was not elected to the provincial legislature, she was elected to the National Council of Provinces instead.

Luthuli was one of four EFF MPs who were publicly named and shamed by the party and banned from attending the party's 10th anniversary celebrations at the FNB Stadium on 29 July 2023 for failing to procure buses to take party supporters in their constituencies to the event. The following month, she was "recalled" as an EFF public representative.
