= Nicholas Gotsell =

South African politician (born 1982)

The Honourable Nicholas Gotsell MP

Delegate to the National Council of Provinces

Assembly Member for Western Cape
- Incumbent
- Assumed office 15 June 2024

Personal details
- Born: 25 December 1982 (age 43)
- Citizenship: South African
- Party: Democratic Alliance
- Education: University of South Africa

Nicholas Gotsell (born 25 December 1982) is a South African politician from the Western Cape. He has represented the Democratic Alliance (DA) in the National Council of Provinces since June 2024. He is an attorney by training.

== Early life and career ==
Gotsell was born on 25 December 1982. He was a clerk in the magistrates' courts in Wynberg and Cape Town, and he worked as a judge's registrar in the Western Cape High Court while completing his LLB at the University of South Africa. In 2011 he joined De Klerk & Van Gend, a firm of attorneys in Cape Town, where he served his articles of clerkship. After his admission as an attorney of the High Court of South Africa, he remained at De Klerk & Van Gend as an associate, becoming head of the firm's wills and estates department.

Gotsell left legal practice to join the management of the Democratic Alliance (DA). During the 2021 local elections the GOOD Party criticised him for sharing a faked video clip of GOOD candidate Peter de Villiers; the video was posted on Gotsell's Facebook page and reposted by DA chairperson Helen Zille.

== Parliament of South Africa: 2024–present ==
In the May 2024 general election, Gotsell stood as a parliamentary candidate, ranked 157th on the DA's national party list. He was elected to a seat in the Western Cape caucus of the National Council of Provinces. On 9 July 2024, the council designated him to serve on the Judicial Service Commission as a parliamentary representative. He was also appointed as a member of the Select Committee on Security and Justice, a member of the Select Committee on Public Petitions and Executive Undertakings, and an alternate member of the Select Committee on Cooperative Governance and Public Administration and the Select Committee on Public Infrastructure and Minister in the Presidency.
