= Jeanne Adriaanse =

South African politician (b. 1962)

Jeanne Adriaanse MP

Permanent Delegate to the National Council of Provinces from the North West
- Incumbent
- Assumed office 15 June 2024

Personal details
- Born: 17 February 1962 (age 64)
- Party: Democratic Alliance
- Occupation: Member of Parliament

Jeanne Marguerite Adriaanse (born 17 February 1962) is a South African politician and former educator who has been a Permanent Delegate to the National Council of Provinces from the North West since 2024, representing the Democratic Alliance.

== Background ==
Adriaanse served as a member of the junior city council while attending high school. She was employed as a teacher and served as the chairperson of the Potchefstroom community policing forum between 2014 and 2016. In 2016, she represented the forum during a protest in Potchefstroom's industrial area.

Adriaanse was elected as the ward councillor for ward 24 in the JB Marks Local Municipality in the 2016 municipal election as a member of the Democratic Alliance. She was re-elected in the 2021 municipal election.

== Parliamentary career ==
On 25 March 2024, Adriaanse was announced as a DA parliamentary candidate for the general election to be held on 29 May 2024 during a DA press briefing. Following the election, she was elected to represent the DA in the National Council of Provinces as a permanent delegate from the North West. She subsequently vacated her seat on the JB Marks municipal council. Adriaanse was sworn into office during the inaugural sitting of the National Council of Provinces on 15 June 2024. She was given her committee assignments on 10 July 2024.

Adriaanse was one of three DA MPs who were appointed to serve on the Joint Standing Committee on Intelligence in March 2025.

Adriaanse called on president Cyril Ramaphosa to sack the embattled Minister of Higher Education and Training Nobuhle Nkabane during a speech on the department's budget vote in the NCOP on 2 July 2025.

In June 2026, Adriaanse condemned the brutal murder of an elderly resident in Orkney. She said in a press statement: "This horrific incident serves as a stark reminder that too many South Africans continue to live under the constant threat of violent crime."

=== Committee assignments ===
- Select Committee on Social Services (Member)
- Select Committee on Education, Sciences and Creative Industries (Member)
- Select Committee on Appropriations (Alternate Member)
- Select Committee on Finance (Alternate Member)
- Joint Standing Committee on Intelligence (Member)
