= Kenny Motsamai =

South African anti-apartheid activist, convicted murderer and politician

Kenny Motsamai MP

Permanent Delegate to the National Council of Provinces from Gauteng
- Incumbent
- Assumed office 23 May 2019

Personal details
- Born: Shadrack Doshani; 1962 or 1963 (age 63–64)
- Party: Economic Freedom Fighters (2018–present); Pan Africanist Congress of Azania (Until 2018)
- Spouse: Mantombi Magagula
- Children: 4 (1 deceased)
- Profession: Politician

Kenny Thabo Motsamai (born Shadrack Doshani, 1962 or 1963) is a South African anti-apartheid activist, convicted murderer and politician. A member of the Economic Freedom Fighters party, he has been a permanent delegate to the National Council of Provinces from Gauteng since May 2019. Motsamai is a former military commander of the Azanian People's Liberation Army, the military wing of the Pan Africanist Congress of Azania during apartheid. He was imprisoned for nearly three decades for killing a white traffic officer during a bank robbery in 1989.

== Early life ==
Motsamai was born as Shadrack Doshani in the early 1960s. He was a military commander in the Azanian People's Liberation Army (APLA), the military wing of the Pan Africanist Congress during apartheid.

== Murder conviction ==
In 1989, Motsamai and other PAC combatants robbed a bank in Rustenburg, which was sanctioned by the PAC to help it finance its anti-apartheid activities. During the robbery, the combatants encountered police and Motsamai killed a white traffic officer. Motsamai was arrested for the murder after he returned from military training in Ethiopia. He was later convicted and sentenced to two life sentences in 1989, which was considered a political act by the Truth and Reconciliation Commission, however, the offence was later changed to armed robbery which the PAC described as a ploy to not release him. The TRC then refused to give him amnesty, because the crime was not of a political nature. He and the PAC maintained that he was a political prisoner and the party campaigned for his release. Motsamai has refused to apologise or show remorse for the killing of the officer. He said in an interview with DRUM after his release in January 2017: "I won’t apologise for anything, there is no white person that has ever apologised for apartheid.”

== Parole and re-arrest ==
On 18 January 2016, Motsamai was set to be released on conditional day parole following a recommendation by the National Council for Correctional Services (NCCS) to the Minister of Justice and Correctional Services, Michael Masutha, however, he refused to sign the papers entailing his parole conditions because he did not understand the legal implications of his parole. On 11 July 2016, Motsamai began his six months on day parole. He could leave the Boksburg Correction Centre daily at 8am but he had to return before nightfall. His movements was monitored via a monitoring device and he could not participate in any political activities. The Correctional Supervision and Parole Board granted him full parole on 11 January 2017 with certain conditions, such as his movement still begin monitored, and he was released from prison on the same day. He had spent a total of 28 years in prison. He was provided with a low-cost government house in Katlehong and started a car wash with a R40,000 donation pastor Paseka Motsoeneng‚ also known as Prophet Mboro, gave him after his release. The business reportedly collapsed a few months later.

On 9 February 2018, Motsamai was arrested at his house in Katlehong for violating Section 52 (7) of the Correctional Services Act 111 of 1998. He had breached the house arrest parole conditions by leaving the Boksburg magisterial district‚ without permission from the Boksburg Community Corrections on 7 February and allegedly lied about going to Hatfield in Pretoria on 8 February to attend to pension matters for his children, when he was allegedly seen addressing a protest at the Department of Military Veterans' headquarters and getting violent with department officials. He had been previously warned not to violate his parole conditions. Motsamai's lawyer, Andries Nkome, denied that there was a protest at the department's headquarters and said that Motsamai was one of 250 military veterans that wanted to get their benefits from the department. Nkome argued that the allegation that he addressed a protest was based on hearsay. On 21 March 2018, Masutha took the decision to revoke Motsamai's parole for failing to adhere to his parole conditions. He did inform Motsamai of his decision to only incarcerate him for three months, which was significantly lower than the 24 months that the Correctional Supervision Board at the Boksburg Correctional Centre had recommended. Motsamai was released from prison in June 2018.

== Parliamentary career ==
Motsamai left the PAC and joined the Economic Freedom Fighters party in July 2018. During a radio interview with POWER Breakfast, Motsamai said on joining the EFF: "I was with the PAC because it was fighting for the land, but now the EFF is fighting for that, that’s why I am here." Prior to the 2019 general election, EFF leader Julius Malema said that the party would fight the criminal record of Motsamai in order for them to send him to the National Council of Provinces, the upper house of the South African parliament, after the election. After the election, the Gauteng Provincial Legislature elected Motsamai as a permanent delegate to the NCOP.

On 23 May 2019, Chief Justice Mogoeng Mogoeng, who was required by the constitution to oversee the swearing in of new Members of Parliament during the first session of each house, began the proceedings of first sitting of the new NCOP by citing section 106 of the constitution, which prohibits convicted criminals from becoming Members of Parliament and indirectly mentioning Motsamai's past murder conviction and him being out on parole. Mogoeng went on to say: "The starting point says 'anyone who after this section took effect'. On the information at my disposal, the particular delegate was convicted in 1989 and the constitution took effect in 1996. So this section 106 (1)(e) seems not to exclude that delegate." This was met with applause from EFF MPs in the chamber and the public gallery. After his swearing-in, Motsamai appealed to President Cyril Ramaphosa to think about improving the wellbeing of military veterans and to grant amnesty to political prisoners who were still serving out sentences in prison.

In September 2019, the African National Congress alleged that Motsamai "verbally abused and almost physically engaged" with ANC MPL and the deputy speaker of the Gauteng Provincial Legislature, Vuyo Mhlakaza-Manamela during a NCOP programme. The party called for action against Motsamai's “unbecoming behaviour”.

On 7 September 2020, Motsamai was arrested outside a Clicks in Evaton after he was in altercation with police and resisted arrest. He appeared in the Sedibeng Magistrate's Court on charges of assaulting a police officer and resisting arrest, and was granted bail. The magistrate's court dismissed the case on 14 September.

== Personal life ==
Motsamai is married to Mantombi Magagula and they have three biological children. On 29 June 2022, Motsamai's adopted daughter, fourteen-year-old Lindokuhle Makotshi, died in hospital after she was raped and poisoned on 27 June. A 25-year-old man was arrested in connection to the rape and appeared in court. A murder charge will now be added to the charge sheet.
