= Naledi Pandor =

South African politician (born 1953)

The Honourable Naledi Pandor
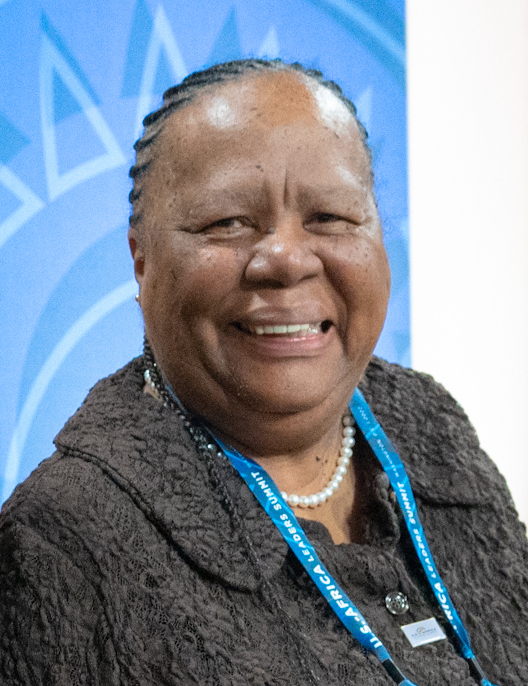
- Pandor in 2022

Chancellor of Nelson Mandela University
- Incumbent
- Assumed office 1 April 2026
- Vice-Chancellor: Sibongile Muthwa
- Preceded by: Geraldine Fraser-Moleketi

Minister of International Relations and Cooperation
- In office 30 May 2019 – 30 June 2024
- President: Cyril Ramaphosa
- Deputy: Alvin Botes; Candith Mashego-Dlamini
- Preceded by: Lindiwe Sisulu
- Succeeded by: Ronald Lamola

Minister of Higher Education and Training
- In office 27 February 2018 – 29 May 2019
- President: Cyril Ramaphosa
- Deputy: Buti Manamela
- Preceded by: Hlengiwe Mkhize
- Succeeded by: Blade Nzimande (Higher Education, Science and Technology)

Minister of Science and Technology
- In office 26 May 2014 – 26 February 2018
- President: Jacob Zuma; Cyril Ramaphosa
- Deputy: Zanele kaMagwaza-Msibi
- Preceded by: Derek Hanekom
- Succeeded by: Mmamoloko Kubayi-Ngubane
- In office 10 May 2009 – 4 October 2012
- President: Jacob Zuma
- Deputy: Zanele kaMagwaza-Msibi
- Preceded by: Mosibudi Mangena
- Succeeded by: Derek Hanekom

Minister of Home Affairs
- In office 2 October 2012 – 25 May 2014; Acting: 2 October 2012 – 4 October 2012
- President: Jacob Zuma
- Deputy: Fatima Chohan
- Preceded by: Nkosazana Dlamini-Zuma
- Succeeded by: Malusi Gigaba

Minister of Education
- In office 12 May 2004 – 10 May 2009
- President: Thabo Mbeki; Kgalema Motlanthe
- Deputy: Enver Surty
- Preceded by: Kader Asmal
- Succeeded by: Angie Motshekga (Basic Education); Blade Nzimande (Higher Education and Training)

2nd Chairperson of the National Council of Provinces
- In office 21 June 1999 – 4 May 2004
- President: Thabo Mbeki
- Preceded by: Mosiuoa Lekota
- Succeeded by: Joyce Kgoali

Personal details
- Born: Grace Naledi Mandisa Matthews; 7 December 1953 (age 72) Durban, Union of South Africa
- Party: African National Congress
- Spouse: Sharif Pandor
- Children: 4
- Relatives: Z. K. Matthews (grandfather); Joe Matthews (father)
- Education: University of Swaziland (BA); University of Botswana (BA); University of London (MA); Stellenbosch University (MA); University of Pretoria (PhD)

Academic background
- Thesis: Contested meanings of transformation in higher education in post-apartheid South Africa

Grace Naledi Mandisa Pandor (née Matthews; born 7 December 1953) is a South African politician, educator and academic who served as the Minister of International Relations and Cooperation from 2019 until 2024. She also served as a Member of Parliament (MP) for the African National Congress (ANC) from 1994 to 2024.

Born in Durban, Pandor completed high school in Botswana. She qualified as a teacher and taught at multiple schools and universities, while she achieved various degrees from different universities. Pandor took office as a Member of Parliament in 1994. She soon became Deputy Chief Whip of the ANC caucus in 1995. She was elected Deputy Chairperson of the National Council of Provinces in 1998 and became chairperson in 1999.

She initially became a member of the national cabinet in 2004, following President Thabo Mbeki's decision to appoint her as Minister of Education. She retained her post in the cabinet of Kgalema Motlanthe. Newly elected President Jacob Zuma named her Minister of Science and Technology in 2009. She served in the position until her appointment as Minister of Home Affairs in 2012. She returned to the post of Minister of Science and Technology in 2014 and held it until 2018, when she became Minister of Higher Education and Training in the first cabinet of President Cyril Ramaphosa. After the 2019 general election, Pandor was mentioned as a possible candidate for Deputy President of South Africa. She was instead appointed Minister of International Relations and Cooperation. Pandor unsuccessfully stood for re-election to the National Assembly at the 2024 general election.

She has been the chair of the board of trustees of the Nelson Mandela Foundation since 1 October 2024. On 7 January 2026, she was appointed as the Chancellor of Nelson Mandela University, with effect from 1 April 2026. Her inauguration into the role took place on 08 April 2026.

== Early life and education ==
Grace Naledi Mandisa Matthews was born on 7 December 1953 in Durban, Natal, to Regina Thelma and Joe Matthews, a political and anti-apartheid activist and the son of academic Z. K. Matthews. She received her primary and secondary education in Botswana. She matriculated from Gaborone Secondary School. Between 1973 and 1977, she achieved a Certificate for Continuing Education and a bachelor's degree from the University of Swaziland and the University of Botswana, respectively. She then went overseas and fulfilled a Diploma in Education and an MA degree from the University of London between 1978 and 1979.

Pandor obtained a diploma in higher education, administration and leadership from the Bryn Mawr Summer Programme in 1992, and soon enrolled at Harvard Kennedy School to receive a diploma in leadership in development in 1997. She also attained an MA degree in linguistics from the University of Stellenbosch in the same year. Pandor received her PhD in education at the University of Pretoria in 2019, with a thesis titled "The contested meaning of transformation in higher education in post-apartheid South Africa".

== Teaching career ==
Pandor became a teacher at the Ernest Bevin School in London in 1980. She was subsequently employed as a teacher in Gaborone from 1981 to 1984, and as an instructor at the Taung College of Education from 1984 to 1986. Pandor worked as a senior lecturer in English at the University of Bophuthatswana from 1986 to 1989, and then as a senior fellow in the Academic Support Programme of the University of Cape Town from 1989 to 1994.

While at the University of Bophuthatswana, Pandor served as the chair of the university's Union of Democratic Staff Associations between 1988 and 1990. She was appointed the chairperson of the Western Cape National Executive Committee of the National Education Coordinating Committee in 1991 and served in the position until 1993. At the same time, she was part of the ANC's Western Cape Education Committee.

Additionally, Pandor chaired the ANC Athlone Central branch, while serving as both the head of the Desmond Tutu Education Trust and the Western Cape School Building Trust.

From 1992 to 1995, she worked as deputy head of the Tertiary Education Fund of South Africa. She soon became head of the fund. She was also deputy chairperson of the Joint Education Trust Board of Trustees between 1993 and 2001.

She was chancellor of Cape Technikon from 2002 to 2004. During the same period, she was a member of the governing council of the University of Fort Hare.

== Early parliamentary career ==
Pandor became a Member of the Parliament in the lower house of Parliament, the National Assembly, following the 1994 general election. Within the ANC caucus, she served as Deputy Chief Whip from 1995 until her deployment to the upper house of Parliament, the National Council of Provinces, in 1998. She served as Deputy Chairperson until her appointment as Chairperson following the 1999 general election. She succeeded inaugural Chairperson Mosioua Lekota when she assumed the office on 21 June 1999. She was the first woman to hold the role. Joyce Kgoali succeeded Pandor in 2004 and consequently became the second woman to hold the role.

== National government ==
=== Minister of Education (2004–2009) ===
Pandor returned to the National Assembly following the 2004 general election. President Thabo Mbeki appointed her to the role of Minister of Education; she took office on 12 May 2004. During her tenure in the portfolio, she was responsible for a complete overhaul of the nation's education system. Pandor initiated reforms to the country's failed implementation of the outcomes-based education (OBE) system. Mbeki resigned in 2008 and left Kgalema Motlanthe in charge. Motlanthe retained Pandor in her position in his interim cabinet.

=== Minister of Science and Technology (2009–2012) ===
Following the 2009 general election, Jacob Zuma became the new President of South Africa. He unbundled the Education Ministry into two new portfolios and appointed Pandor to the newly established post of Minister of Science and Technology in May 2009. During her time in the position, Pandor served as a driving force for South Africa to host the Square Kilometre Array (SKA) in the Karoo region. South Africa won the bid.

=== Minister of Home Affairs (2012–2014) ===
In October 2012, Nkosazana Dlamini-Zuma resigned as Minister of Home Affairs in order for her to take up the role as Chair of the African Union. Her resignation caused a vacancy in the cabinet. Zuma consequently appointed Pandor as Minister of Home Affairs in an acting capacity on 2 October 2012. Soon after on 4 October 2012, Zuma formally appointed her as Minister of Home Affairs. In October 2013, she served as acting president for a day as Zuma visited the Democratic Republic of the Congo.

=== Minister of Science and Technology (2014–2018) ===
Following her re-election in the 2014 general election, Zuma announced that Pandor would return to the Department of Science and Technology. Malusi Gigaba succeeded her as Minister of Home Affairs. She took office on 26 May 2014 and succeeded Derek Hanekom.

=== Minister of Higher Education and Training (2018–2019) ===
Cyril Ramaphosa assumed the office of President in February 2018. Pandor was appointed Minister of Higher Education and Training and took office on 27 February 2018, succeeding Hlengiwe Mkhize.

=== Minister of International Relations and Cooperation (2019–2024) ===
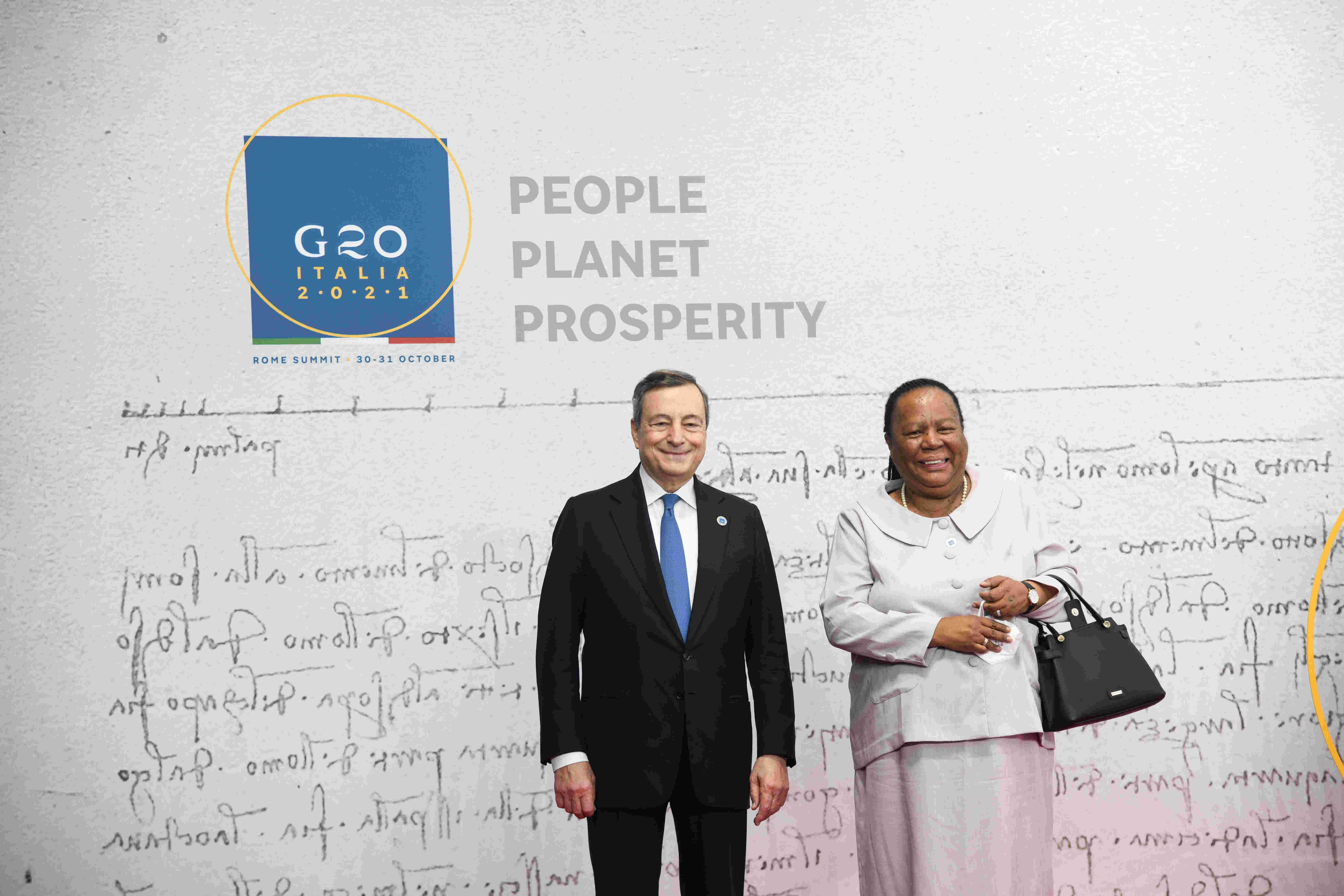
Pandor at the 2021 G20 Rome summit

After the 2019 general election, the Ministry of Higher Education and Training was split. Pandor was speculated to be appointed Deputy President of South Africa. She was Ramaphosa's original choice for Deputy President back in 2017 at the ANC's elective conference. She was instead appointed Minister of International Relations and Cooperation and assumed office on 30 May 2019.

In response to the 2022 Russian invasion of Ukraine, Pandor and the Department of International Relations and Cooperation were initially critical of the invasion and released a statement, in which they called on Russia to withdraw its forces in Ukraine immediately. Ramaphosa was reportedly unhappy with Pandor and the department's statement, because it contradicted South Africa's position that negotiation was needed to end the war. Pandor later backtracked on her position, toeing the party line instead.

On 10 March 2022, Pandor said that she supported the idea of a single African currency to increase intra-continental trade.

In September 2022, Pandor stood in for Ramaphosa at the Seventy-seventh session of the United Nations General Assembly after he had decided to return to South Africa due to the ongoing electricity crisis after his working visit in Washington, D.C. In her address to the assembly, Pandor said that all ongoing wars and conflicts around the world should be given equal attention. She also called for Israel to be held accountable for its "destructive actions" in the Israeli–Palestinian conflict, for the embargo against Cuba to be lifted and echoed the African Union's call for sanctions against Zimbabwe to be lifted.

Pandor was one of a number of sitting cabinet ministers who unsuccessfully sought re-election to the National Executive Committee of the African National Congress at the party's 55th National Conference in December 2022.

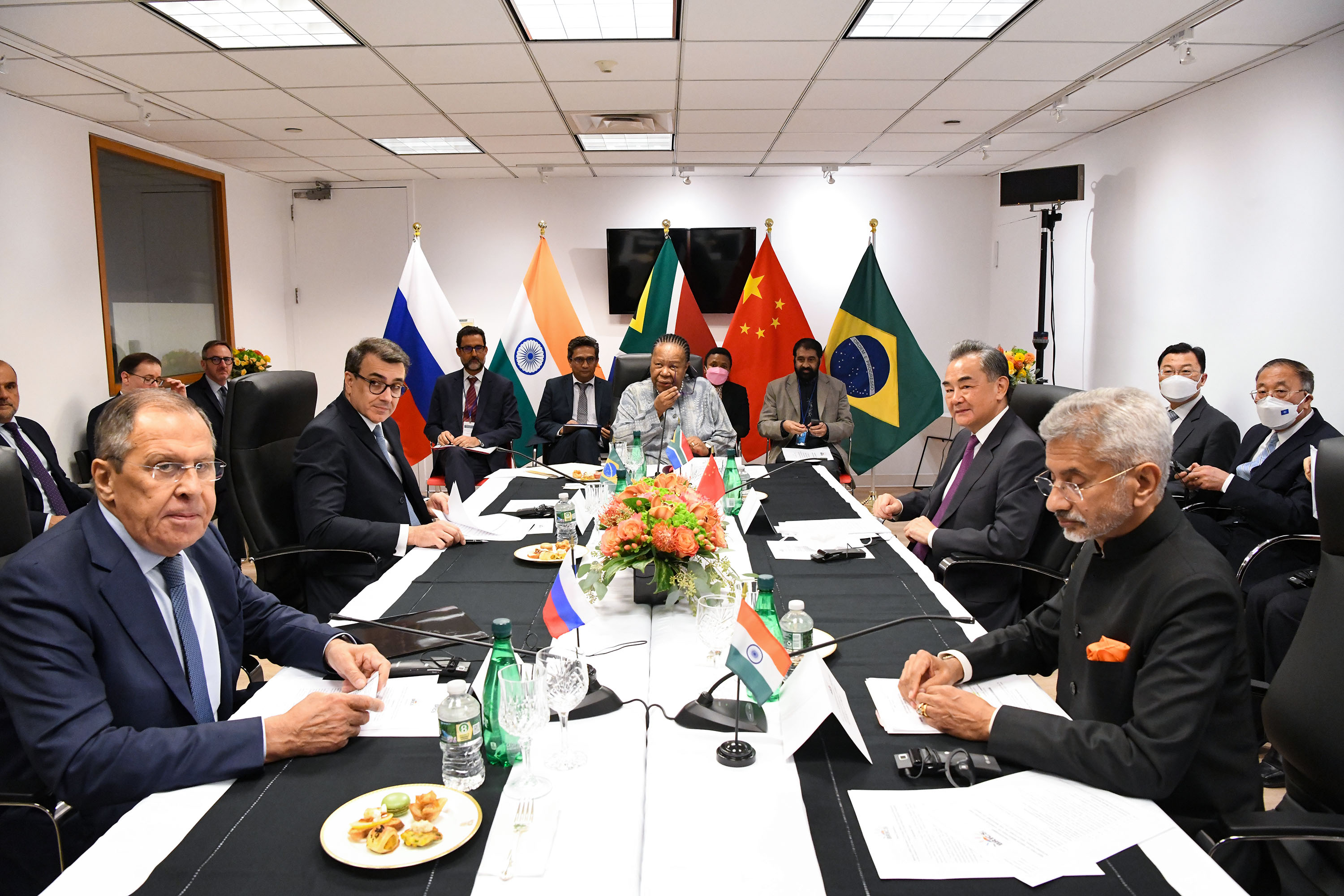
Pandor at a BRICS meeting in 2022

Reacting to the ICC arrest warrant for Vladimir Putin, Pandor criticized the International Criminal Court (ICC) for not having what she called an "evenhanded approach" to all leaders responsible for violations of international law. South Africa, which failed in its obligation to arrest visiting Sudanese President Omar al-Bashir in June 2015, invited Russian President Vladimir Putin to the 15th BRICS Summit of leaders of Brazil, Russia, India, China and South Africa in August 2023. In May 2023, Pandor announced that she had approved diplomatic immunity for Vladimir Putin and his officials so that they could attend the 15th BRICS Summit despite the ICC arrest warrant.

Pandor is known, in part, for her strong anti-Israel stance. Following the October 7 attacks, 2023, Pandor held a telephone call with Hamas leader Ismail Haniyeh. According to reports, the phone call was described as "embarrassing" for President Cyril Ramaphosa, who was stated to have had "no prior knowledge" of its occurrence. Following news of the call, the South African Jewish Board of Deputies (SAJBD) issued a statement criticizing Minister Pandor’s reported expression of “support” for Hamas in the aftermath of the October 7 attacks on Israeli targets. The SAJBD argued that this stance had placed South Africa in "very dangerous waters" and subsequently called for Pandor’s immediate resignation or dismissal. On 12 November 2023, Pandor called on the ICJ to speed up its investigation of Application of the Convention on the Prevention and Punishment of the Crime of Genocide in the Gaza Strip and that she expects the ICC to issue an arrest warrant for Israeli Prime Minister Netanyahu.

Pandor lost her seat in Parliament at the 2024 general election, having been ranked 86th on the ANC's national parliamentary list and the ANC only winning 73 national list seats. Ronald Lamola was appointed to succeed her as Minister of International Relations and Cooperation.

== Post-political career ==
On 23 September 2024, Pandor was appointed chairperson of the board of trustees of the Nelson Mandela Foundation, succeeding Njabulo Ndebele. Her appointment took effect on 1 October 2024.

On 7 January 2026, Pandor was announced as the new chancellor of Nelson Mandela University, taking over from Geraldine Fraser-Moleketi. She officially took office on 1 April 2026, with her inauguration ceremony being held on 8 April 2026.

== Personal life ==
Pandor is married to Sharif Joseph Pandor, whom she met while studying in Botswana, and they have four children together.

Her daughter, Aisha Pandor, is a prominent tech entrepreneur and investor, becoming CEO of California-based AI health platform Pandora Health.

She converted to Islam after she met her husband. Her in-laws gave her the Islamic name of Nadia. On her religious conversion, Pandor said: "My parents said God is God. As long as you worship Him we will support you and the Islamic principles are universal. Certainly, Islam demands much more of you in terms of observance."

On 22 May 2026, Pandor and her husband were robbed at gunpoint by three attackers in their Pretoria home.

Political offices
Preceded by Lindiwe Sisulu	Minister of International Relations and Cooperation; 2019–2024	Succeeded by Ronald Lamola
Preceded by Hlengiwe Mkhize	Minister of Higher Education and Training; 2018–2019	Succeeded by Ministry split
Preceded by Derek Hanekom	Minister of Science and Technology; 2014–2018	Succeeded by Nkhensani Kubayi-Ngubane
Preceded by Nkosazana Dlamini-Zuma	Minister of Home Affairs; 2012–2014	Succeeded by Malusi Gigaba
Preceded by Mosibudi Mangena	Minister of Science and Technology; 2009–2012	Succeeded by Derek Hanekom
Preceded by Kader Asmal	Minister of Education; 2004–2009	Succeeded by Ministry split
Preceded by Mosiuoa Lekota	Chairperson of the National Council of Provinces; 1999–2004	Succeeded by Joyce Kgoali
