= Edward Njadu =

South African politician

Edward Njadu MP

Permanent Delegate to the National Council of Provinces from the Western Cape
- Incumbent
- Assumed office 23 May 2019

Personal details
- Born: 1966 or 1967 (age 59–60)
- Party: African National Congress
- Spouse: Lydia (Until 2023; her death)
- Children: 3
- Profession: Politician

Edward Zoyisile Njadu (born 1966 or 1967) is a South African politician who has been a Permanent Delegate to the National Council of Provinces from the Western Cape since 2019. A member of the African National Congress, Njadu is a former mayor of the Central Karoo District Municipality.

== Early political career ==
Njadu was a member of the Provincial Executive Committee of the African National Congress for four terms. He was a ward councillor for the ANC and served as the mayor of the Central Karoo District Municipality. Njadu was also a regional organiser and a regional secretary for two terms.

== Parliamentary career ==
Njadu unsuccessfully stood for the lower house of parliament, the National Assembly, in the 2019 general elections, ranked 188th on the ANC's national candidate list. After the election, the ANC selected Njadu and Maurencia Gillion to take up the party's two seats in the Western Cape provincial delegation to the National Council of Provinces, the upper house of the South African parliament. Having entered parliament, he was appointed the party's Programming Whip in the NCOP.

After Njadu became an MP, his office in Beaufort West was shut down. He was relocated to Eerste River in Cape Town but Pemmy Majodina, the ANC chief whip in the National Assembly, relocated him back to the region.

== Personal life ==
Njadu lives in Beaufort West. He was married to Lydia for 32 years, and they had three children.

Lydia Njadu was fatally shot by three men in their Beaufort West home on 22 January 2023. Two suspects linked to her murder have since been arrested.
