= Moletsane Moletsane =

South African politician

Moletsane Moletsane MP

Permanent Delegate to the National Council of Provinces from the Free State
- Incumbent
- Assumed office 23 May 2019

Personal details
- Born: Moletsane Simon Moletsane
- Party: Economic Freedom Fighters
- Education: Sefikeng College of Education

Moletsane Simon Moletsane is a South African politician. A member of the Economic Freedom Fighters party, he has been a Permanent Delegate to the National Council of Provinces from the Free State since May 2019.

Moletsane earned a diploma in education from the Sefikeng College of Education. He is a member of the EFF's Provincial Command Team in the Free State.
