= Mbulelo Magwala =

South African politician

Mbulelo Magwala MP

Permanent Delegate to the National Council of Provinces from the Western Cape
- Incumbent
- Assumed office 7 March 2023
- Preceded by: Andrew Arnolds

Personal details
- Born: 1984 or 1985 (age 40–41) George, South Africa
- Party: Economic Freedom Fighters
- Profession: Politician

Mbulelo Jonathan Magwala (born 1984 or 1985) is a South African politician who has been a Permanent Delegate to the National Council of Provinces from the Western Cape since 2023. Magwala serves as the third Provincial Secretary of the Economic Freedom Fighters, as of October 2022.

== Early life ==
Magwala was born to a single mother, Nompazamo Magwala, in George. He has a younger brother, Sinethemba Magwala. During his childhood, he frequently moved towns, from Middelburg to Pretoria and on to Plettenberg Bay where he matriculated from Murray High School.

== Career ==
Magwala worked as a security guard at Pick n Pay in 2005, before becoming the supervisor at the PnP Precap Centre in George. He then also worked for Pioneer Foods as a field marketer. Magwala was also the manager of the Picardi Rebel store at Thembalethu Square and a sales representative for Boland Wines. Before becoming active in politics, he was a representative for Colven Associates.

== Political career ==
Magwala became involved in politics in 2013 as a field worker for the Economic Freedom Fighters until 2014. In 2014, he was elected branch chairperson of the EFF branch in Ward 11 of the George Local Municipality.

During the 2016 municipal elections, Magwala was appointed sub-regional convenor of the EFF. He was appointed regional secretary of the EFF's Southern Cape region in 2018, serving two terms in the position.

At the EFF's provincial elective conference in October 2022, Magwala was elected as the party's provincial secretary. He is the third person to hold the office.

== Parliamentary career ==
Magwala was sworn in as a Permanent Delegate to the National Council of Provinces from the Western Cape on 7 March 2023.

=== Committee assignments ===
On 7 March 2023, Magwala was assigned to the following committees:

- Select Committee on Land Reform, Environment, Mineral Resources and Energy
- Select Committee on Public Enterprises and Communication
