= Bushbuckridge Local Municipality elections =

The Bushbuckridge Local Municipality is a Local Municipality in Mpumalanga, South Africa. The council consists of seventy-six members elected by mixed-member proportional representation. Thirty-eight councillors are elected by first-past-the-post voting in thirty-eight wards, while the remaining thirty-eight are chosen from party lists so that the total number of party representatives is proportional to the number of votes received. In the election of 1 November 2021 the African National Congress (ANC) won a majority of fifty-three seats.

== Results ==
The following table shows the composition of the council after past elections.

Event	ACDP	ANC	APC	BRA	DA	EFF	PAC	Other	Total
2006 election	1	57	—	—	2	—	5	3	68
2011 election	1	55	3	7	3	—	1	4	74
2016 election	0	53	2	14	3	4	—	0	76
2021 election	0	53	2	2	2	8	—	9	76

== March 2006 election ==
The following table shows the results of the 2006 election.

Party	Ward			List			Total seats
Party	Votes	%	Seats	Votes	%	Seats	Total seats
African National Congress	65,320	73.72	32	70,926	85.22	25	57
Independent candidates	14,553	16.42	2				2
Pan Africanist Congress of Azania	4,818	5.44	0	6,183	7.43	5	5
Democratic Alliance	1,568	1.77	0	2,035	2.45	2	2
African Christian Democratic Party	1,194	1.35	0	1,263	1.52	1	1
United Democratic Movement	763	0.86	0	1,637	1.97	1	1
Inkatha Freedom Party	232	0.26	0	592	0.71	0	0
Ximoko Party	159	0.18	0	593	0.71	0	0
Total	88,607	100.00	34	83,229	100.00	34	68
Valid votes	88,607	97.49		83,229	93.54		
Invalid/blank votes	2,283	2.51		5,748	6.46		
Total votes	90,890	100.00		88,977	100.00		
Registered voters/turnout	198,849	45.71		198,849	44.75		

== May 2011 election ==
The following table shows the results of the 2011 election.

Party	Ward			List			Total seats
Party	Votes	%	Seats	Votes	%	Seats	Total seats
African National Congress	81,338	72.03	35	87,006	76.83	20	55
Bushbuckridge Residents Association	11,103	9.83	1	11,153	9.85	6	7
Congress of the People	4,776	4.23	0	4,556	4.02	3	3
African People's Convention	4,201	3.72	0	4,186	3.70	3	3
Democratic Alliance	4,444	3.94	0	3,887	3.43	3	3
Independent candidates	4,010	3.55	1				1
Pan Africanist Congress of Azania	1,800	1.59	0	1,020	0.90	1	1
African Christian Democratic Party	843	0.75	0	839	0.74	1	1
United Democratic Movement	366	0.32	0	441	0.39	0	0
Ximoko Party	36	0.03	0	156	0.14	0	0
Total	112,917	100.00	37	113,244	100.00	37	74
Valid votes	112,917	98.07		113,244	97.53		
Invalid/blank votes	2,228	1.93		2,872	2.47		
Total votes	115,145	100.00		116,116	100.00		
Registered voters/turnout	223,190	51.59		223,190	52.03		

== August 2016 election ==
The following table shows the results of the 2016 election.

Party	Ward			List			Total seats
Party	Votes	%	Seats	Votes	%	Seats	Total seats
African National Congress	89,017	69.28	33	89,156	69.65	20	53
Bushbuckridge Residents Association	23,205	18.06	5	23,186	18.11	9	14
Economic Freedom Fighters	7,201	5.60	0	7,036	5.50	4	4
Democratic Alliance	3,944	3.07	0	3,777	2.95	3	3
African People's Convention	3,051	2.37	0	3,186	2.49	2	2
African Christian Democratic Party	396	0.31	0	551	0.43	0	0
Democratic Community Movement	398	0.31	0	421	0.33	0	0
Congress of the People	360	0.28	0	443	0.35	0	0
Independent candidates	633	0.49	0				0
Pan African Socialist Movement of Azania	284	0.22	0	184	0.14	0	0
Agang South Africa				67	0.05	0	0
Total	128,489	100.00	38	128,007	100.00	38	76
Valid votes	128,489	98.22		128,007	97.88		
Invalid/blank votes	2,329	1.78		2,766	2.12		
Total votes	130,818	100.00		130,773	100.00		
Registered voters/turnout	244,180	53.57		244,180	53.56		

=== By-elections from August 2016 to November 2021 ===
In December 2020, the Better Residents Association (formerly the Bushbuckridge Residents Association) lost 3 of its 14 seats in the municipality after it expelled three of its ward councillors, and did not contest the resulting by-elections.

== November 2021 election ==
The following table shows the results of the 2021 election.

Party	Ward			List			Total seats
Party	Votes	%	Seats	Votes	%	Seats	Total seats
African National Congress	65,486	63.28	37	69,546	68.33	16	53
Economic Freedom Fighters	10,119	9.78	0	11,183	10.99	8	8
Independent South African National Civic Organisation	5,876	5.68	1	6,628	6.51	4	5
Independent candidates	9,538	9.22	0				0
African People's Convention	2,527	2.44	0	2,974	2.92	2	2
Democratic Alliance	2,394	2.31	0	2,516	2.47	2	2
Better Residents Association	2,377	2.30	0	2,359	2.32	2	2
South Africa My Home Residents Association	1,686	1.63	0	1,715	1.69	1	1
Democratic Community Movement	979	0.95	0	987	0.97	1	1
Bushbuckridge Locals Movement	732	0.71	0	847	0.83	1	1
African Transformation Movement	558	0.54	0	604	0.59	1	1
African Christian Democratic Party	350	0.34	0	755	0.74	0	0
Equal Rights for All	303	0.29	0	336	0.33	0	0
Power of Africans Unity	61	0.06	0	510	0.50	0	0
African Unified Movement	133	0.13	0	173	0.17	0	0
United Democratic Movement	122	0.12	0	153	0.15	0	0
South African Royal Kingdoms Organization	21	0.02	0	217	0.21	0	0
Congress of the People	24	0.02	0	132	0.13	0	0
Able Leadership	54	0.05	0	100	0.10	0	0
The Organic Humanity Movement	65	0.06	0	42	0.04	0	0
Human Dignity Restoration	81	0.08	0				0
Total	103,486	100.00	38	101,777	100.00	38	76
Valid votes	103,486	97.80		101,777	97.33		
Invalid/blank votes	2,333	2.20		2,791	2.67		
Total votes	105,819	100.00		104,568	100.00		
Registered voters/turnout	246,357	42.95		246,357	42.45		

=== By-elections from November 2021 ===
The following by-elections were held to fill vacant ward seats in the period from November 2021.

Date	Ward	Party of the previous councillor	Party of the newly elected councillor
31 Aug 2022	13	African National Congress	African National Congress
31 Jan 2024	3	African National Congress	African National Congress
15 Jan 2025	24	African National Congress	African National Congress
24 Jun 2026	3	African National Congress	African National Congress

In ward 13, the ANC candidate died, and in the by-election held on 31 August 2022, the ANC candidate retained the seat by 21 votes over the EFF.

In ward 3, sitting candidate Lot Nkuna was assassinated. The ANC candidate retained the seat for the party.
