= Lydia Moshodi =

South African politician (born 1971)

Lydia Moshodi MP

Chairperson of the Joint Committee on Ethics and Members' Interests
- Incumbent
- Assumed office 11 September 2019 Serving with Bekizwe Nkosi
- Preceded by: Omie Singh

Permanent Delegate to the National Council of Provinces

Assembly Member for Free State
- Incumbent
- Assumed office 11 April 2016
- In office 7 May 2009 – 21 April 2014

Personal details
- Born: 18 April 1971 (age 55)
- Citizenship: South Africa
- Party: African National Congress

Moji Lydia Moshodi (born 18 April 1971) is a South African politician from the Free State. A member of the African National Congress (ANC), she has represented the Free State in the National Council of Provinces since 2016. She previously held her seat from 2009 to 2014. Since 2019, she has co-chaired Parliament's Joint Committee on Ethics and Members' Interests.

== Legislative career ==
Born on 18 April 1971, Moshodi was first elected to Parliament at the 2009 general election, when she was elected to represent the Free State in the National Council of Provinces. At the end of the legislative term, she stood for election to the National Assembly in the 2014 general election, but she did not win a seat. However, two years later, on 11 April 2016, she returned to Parliament when she was assigned to fill a casual vacancy in the National Council of Provinces. She was re-elected to her seat at the 2019 general election.

After the 2019 election, the ANC announced that it would nominate Moshodi for election as co-chairperson of the Joint Committee on Ethics and Members' Interests. She was elected to the chair on 11 September, alongside Bheki Nkosi of the National Assembly.
