= Les Govender =

South African politician (born 1954)

The Honourable Les Govender MP
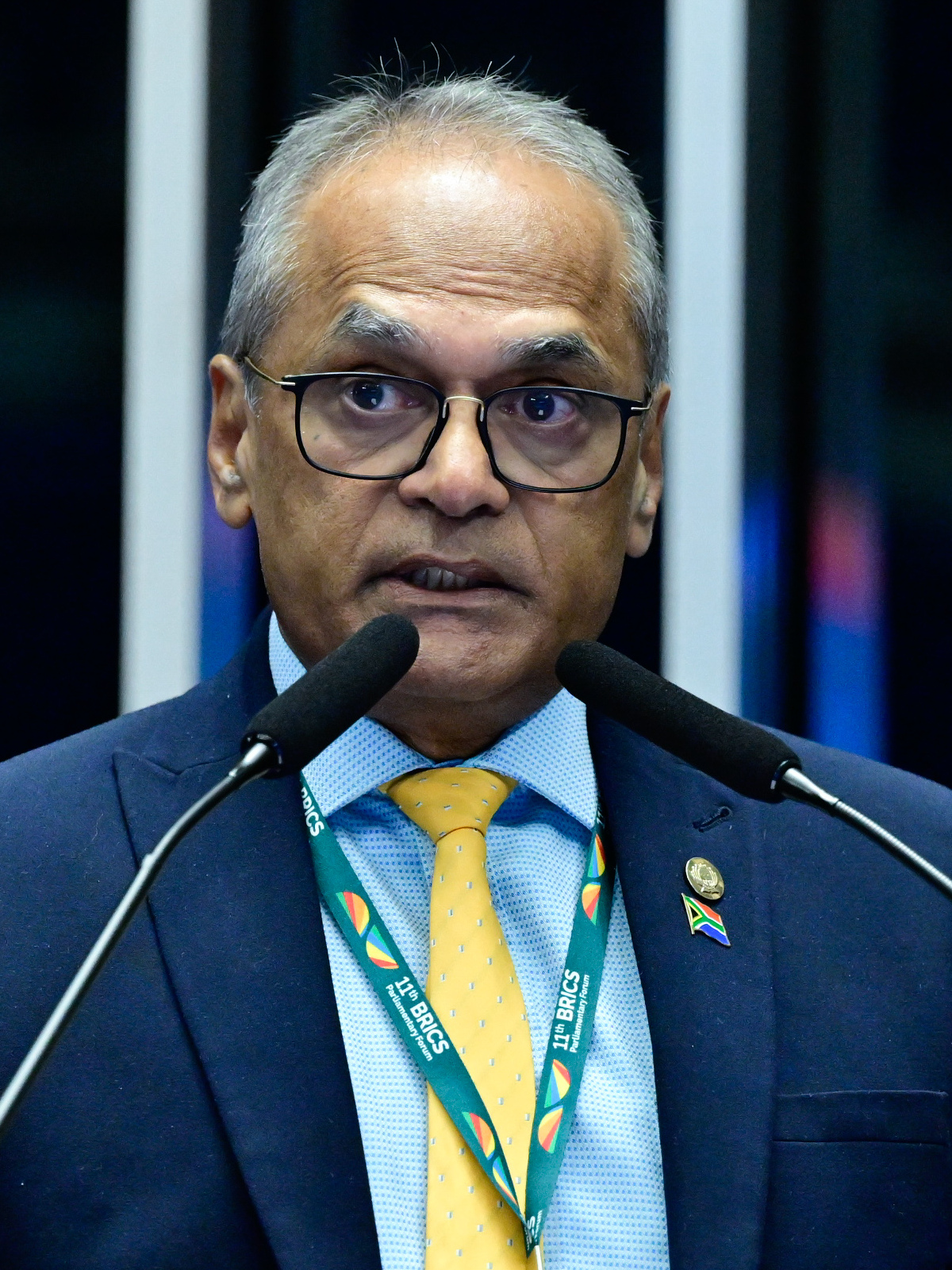
- Govender in 2025

Deputy Chairperson of the National Council of Provinces
- Incumbent
- Assumed office 9 July 2024
- Chairperson: Refilwe Mtsweni-Tsipane
- Preceded by: Sylvia Lucas

Permanent Delegate to the National Council of Provinces

Assembly Member for KwaZulu-Natal
- Incumbent
- Assumed office 15 June 2024

Personal details
- Born: Poobalan Govender; 21 November 1954 (age 71)
- Party: Inkatha Freedom Party

Poobalan "Les" Govender (born 21 November 1954) is a South African politician from KwaZulu-Natal who is currently serving as the Deputy Chairperson of the National Council of Provinces. A member of the Inkatha Freedom Party (IFP), he was a member of the KwaZulu-Natal Provincial Legislature until the May 2024 general election.

== Life and career ==
Govender was born on 21 November 1954. Until 2024 he represented the IFP in the KwaZulu-Natal Provincial Legislature.

== National Council of Provinces: 2024–present ==
In the May 2024 general election, he was ranked 11th on the IFP's provincial party list for KwaZulu-Natal. He was elected as a permanent delegate of KwaZulu-Natal in the National Council of Provinces (NCOP), the upper house of the South African Parliament.

On 9 July 2024, the plenary of the NCOP elected Govender as the Deputy Chairperson of the NCOP. Elected unopposed, he was nominated for the position by Kenny Mmoiemang of the African National Congress (ANC) in terms of a coalition agreement between the ANC and IFP. He deputised NCOP Chairperson Refilwe Mtsweni-Tsipane, who had taken office almost a month earlier; the deputy chairmanship election had been delayed since then, reportedly because of a disagreement among the coalition partners.
