= Kim Medupe =

South African politician

Member of the North West Provincial Legislature
- In office 22 May 2019 – 8 November 2022

Personal details
- Born: 1975 or 1976 (age 50–51)
- Citizenship: South Africa
- Party: African National Congress

Onica Dipuo "Kim" Medupe (born 1975 or 1976) is a South African politician who represented the African National Congress (ANC) in the North West Provincial Legislature between May 2019 and November 2022. She was formerly the Mayor of the North West's Kgetlengrivier Local Municipality.

== Mayor of Kgetlengrivier ==
While she was mayor, in January 2015, Medupe appeared in Koster Magistrate's Court on an assault charge. The Sowetan reported that she and another woman were alleged to have assaulted a woman whom they accused of having an affair with Medupe's husband.

Medupe was re-elected as Kgetlengrivier Mayor in the 2016 local government elections. By mid-2018, she had been in office for about eight years. In May of that year, her house and a four-star guesthouse she owned were set alight during violent service delivery protests in Kgetlengrivier. Medupe and other councillors fled the municipality, which was later placed under administration. The BBC reported that the immediate trigger for the protests had been residents' perception that Medupe had decided to tar the road leading to her guesthouse instead of the road leading to the local clinic. Medupe claimed that the protests were politically motivated.

== Provincial legislature ==
Medupe was elected to the North West Provincial Legislature in the 2019 general election, ranked eighth on the ANC's provincial party list. She resigned in November 2022 and her seat was filled by Nono Maloyi, the ANC's newly elected Provincial Chairperson.
