= Mbulelo Wagaba =

South African footballer

Personal information
- Date of birth: 27 November 1996 (age 29)
- Place of birth: Klerksdorp, South Africa
- Position: Winger

Team information
- Current team: Marumo Gallants
- Number: 12

Youth career
- –2018: Polokwane City

Senior career*
Years	Team	Apps	(Gls)
2018–2020	Polokwane City	6	(0)
2020–	TS Sporting	24	(2)
2021–2022	Platinum City Rovers	21	(4)
2022	Cape Town Spurs	3	(0)
2023	Platinum City Rovers	10	(0)
2023–2024	Orbit College	28	(9)
2024–	Marumo Gallants	3	(0)
- * Club domestic league appearances and goals as of 18 November 2024

Mbulelo Wagaba (born 27 November 1996) is a South African footballer who plays as a winger for Marumo Gallants in the South African Premier Division.

== Career ==
A graduate of Polokwane City's youth academy, Wagaba made his league debut for the club on 7 August 2018, tallying 62 minutes before being replaced by Walter Musona in a 2–0 home defeat to Mamelodi Sundowns.
