= Mohammed Dangor =

South African politician, diplomat and anti-apartheid activist

Mohammed Dangor MP

Permanent Delegate to the National Council of Provinces from Gauteng
- Incumbent
- Assumed office 9 June 2019

Personal details
- Party: African National Congress
- Relations: Jessie Duarte (sister)
- Children: Fareea Dangor, Razien Dangor, Bahia Dangor

Mohammed Dangor is a South African politician, diplomat and anti-apartheid activist who has been a Permanent Delegate to the National Council of Provinces since June 2019. He is a member of the Gauteng provincial delegation representing the African National Congress. Dangor had previously served as South Africa's ambassador to Libya, Syria, and Saudi Arabia.

== Background ==
One of nine children, Dangor became involved in the struggle against apartheid at a young age. After the end of apartheid, Dangor became South Africa's ambassador to Libya, Syria, and Saudi Arabia.

== Parliamentary career ==
Following the 2019 general election, Dangor was elected as a permanent delegate to the National Council of Provinces from the Gauteng province, representing the African National Congress. He was the only delegate not sworn in along with all the other permanent delegates during the first sitting of the NCOP on 23 May 2019; he was sworn in on 9 June 2019 at Constitutional Hill in Johannesburg by Judge President Dustan Mlambo of the Gauteng Division of the High Court.

=== Committee assignments ===
- Joint Constitutional Review Committee
- Select Committee on Cooperative Governance and Traditional Affairs, Water and Sanitation and Human Settlements
- Select Committee on Land Reform, Environment, Mineral Resources and Energy
- Select Committee on Petitions and Executive Undertakings
- Select Committee on Public Enterprises and Communication (Alternate Member)
- Select Committee on Security and Justice
- Select Committee on Transport, Public Service and Administration, Public Works and Infrastructure
- Select Committee on Trade and Industry, Economic Development, Small Business Development, Tourism, Employment and Labour

== Personal life ==
Dangor is a brother of the late ANC deputy secretary-general and anti-apartheid activist Jessie Duarte.

In March 2019, Dangor and his wife were admitted to ICU after they were brutally attacked during a robbery at their home in Johannesburg, Gauteng.
