= Joyce Kgoali =

South African politician

The Honourable Joyce Kgoali

Chairperson of the National Council of Provinces
- In office 4 May 2004 – 21 November 2004
- Preceded by: Naledi Pandor
- Succeeded by: M. J. Mahlangu

Personal details
- Born: Joyce Lesawana Kgoali; 13 April 1950 Basutoland
- Died: 21 November 2004 (aged 54) Park Lane Hospital, Johannesburg, South Africa
- Party: African National Congress
- Spouse: Godfrey Nhlanhla Simelane
- Profession: Politician

Joyce Leswana Kgoali (13 January 1950 – 21 November 2004) was a South African politician. A member of the African National Congress, she served as the Chairperson of the National Council of Provinces from May 2004 until her death in November 2004. She was a Member of the Executive Council in the Gauteng provincial government from 1998 to 1999 and the chairperson of the ANC's parliamentary caucus between 2002 and 2004.

== Life and career ==
Kgoali was born on 13 January 1950 in Basutoland (now Lesotho).

Kgoali was a trade unionist in the textile industry. She was a member of the United Democratic Front whilst she was involved in the Federation of Transvaal Women. She later joined the African National Congress Women's League. Kgoali was active in the party's underground networks.

After the 1994 general election, Kgoali became a Delegate of the Senate, which became the National Council of Provinces in 1997. Gauteng premier Mathole Motshekga appointed her the MEC for Transport in 1998. She held the portfolio until after the 1999 general election.

In 2002, Kgoali became a Member of Parliament. She was appointed the party's caucus chairperson. She was elected Chairperson of the National Council of Provinces in May 2004 following the April 2004 general election.

Kgoali died of complications from an operation on 21 November 2004. She was 54 years old. At the time, she was a member of the national executive committee of the ANC's women's league and a member of the Gauteng ANC provincial executive committee. She is survived by her husband and children.
