= Dennis Ryder =

South African politician

Dennis Ryder MP

Permanent delegate to the National Council of Provinces from Gauteng
- Incumbent
- Assumed office 23 May 2019

Member of the National Assembly of South Africa
- In office 1 July 2017 – 7 May 2019

Personal details
- Born: Dennis Richard Ryder East Rand, South Africa
- Party: Democratic Alliance
- Occupation: Member of Parliament
- Profession: Politician

Dennis Richard Ryder is a South African politician. He has been serving as a parliamentarian since July 2017. Ryder is a member of the Democratic Alliance (DA).

== Political career ==
He started his political career by being elected the mini mayor of Bedfordview in 1983. He joined the Democratic Alliance (DA) and was elected a councillor of the Midvaal Local Municipality in 2011. He won re-election to a second term in 2016.

== Parliamentary career ==
Ryder became a Member of Parliament in July 2017, as he was sworn in as a Member of the National Assembly, the lower house of Parliament. Following the May 2019 general election, he was elected to the upper house, the National Council of Provinces, as one of six permanent delegates from Gauteng. On 24 June, he was given his committee assignments.

=== Committee assignments ===
- Joint Standing Committee on Defence
- Select Committee on Appropriations
- Select Committee on Education and Technology, Sports, Arts and Culture
- Select Committee on Finance
- Select Committee on Health and Social Services
