= Amos Masondo =

South African politician

The Honourable Amos Masondo MP
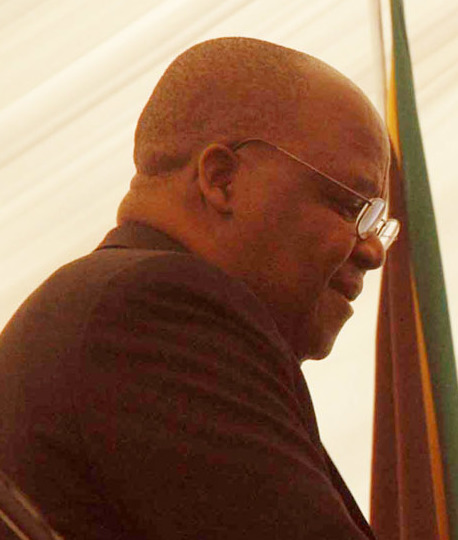
- Masondo in 2007

6th Chairperson of the National Council of Provinces
- In office 23 May 2019 – 15 June 2024
- Deputy: Sylvia Lucas
- Preceded by: Thandi Modise
- Succeeded by: Refilwe Mtsweni-Tsipane
- Constituency: Johannesburg

Mayor of Johannesburg
- In office December 2000 – 2011
- Preceded by: Isaac Mogase
- Succeeded by: Parks Tau

Provincial Treasurer of the African National Congress in Gauteng
- In office 1996–1998
- Chairperson: Tokyo Sexwale
- Preceded by: Mohammed Dangor
- Succeeded by: Joyce Kgoali

Personal details
- Born: Nkosiyakhe Amos Masondo; 21 April 1953 (age 72) Louwsburg, Northern KwaZulu-Natal, South Africa
- Party: African National Congress
- Spouse: Salu Ngubeni-Masondo
- Children: 2 (1 deceased)
- Occupation: Politician; anti-apartheid activist

Nkosiyakhe Amos Masondo (born 21 April 1953 in Louwsburg) is a South African politician, who served as the Chairperson of South Africa's National Council of Provinces between 2019 and 2024. He was the mayor of the city of Johannesburg, South Africa, between December 2000 and 2011. He is a member of the African National Congress, and was the first elected mayor of the Unified City of Johannesburg.

== Biography ==
Born in Louwsburg and educated in Soweto, Masondo was a participant in the anti-Afrikaans riots in 1972. He also established underground Umkhonto we Sizwe cells in Soweto, and was imprisoned on Robben Island from 1975 to 1981 for his participation in anti-apartheid activities.

After he was released, he served as a member of the Soweto Civic Association, and was again detained under the emergency regulations from June 1985 to March 1986, and again from July 1986 to 1989.

He was also elected as a member of the Gauteng Legislature, and was subsequently elected to serve as Mayor of Johannesburg in 2000.

== See also ==
- Timeline of Johannesburg, 2000s
