= Lusizo Makhubela-Mashele =

South African politician

Lusizo Makhubela-Mashele MP

Member of the National Assembly of South Africa
- Incumbent
- Assumed office 6 May 2009

Personal details
- Party: African National Congress

Lusizo Sharon Makhubela-Mashele is a South Africa politician and a Member of Parliament (MP) in the National Assembly for the African National Congress.

== Career ==
Makhubela-Mashele was ranked 115th on the ANC's national list for the April 2009 general election. She was easily elected to the National Assembly of South Africa as the ANC won 267 seats. She was sworn in as an MP on 6 May 2009. During her first term, she was a member of both the health and labour portfolio committees. Makhubela-Mashele was also a whip on the Portfolio Committee on Tourism.

Prior to the general election that was held on 7 May 2014, she was moved up on the ANC's list and occupied the 60th position. She was re-elected at the election. Makhubela-Mashele was sworn in for a second term on 21 May 2014. On 20 June 2014, she became a member of the Portfolio Committee on Energy and a whip of the Portfolio Committee on Tourism. She served on the Portfolio Committee on Energy until October 2016.

On 30 May 2018, Makhubela-Mashele was elected chairperson of the Portfolio Committee on Tourism. She was placed 5th on the ANC's Mpumalanga regional-to-national list for the May 2019 general election and was re-elected. She was then appointed an ordinary member of the Portfolio Committee on Tourism.

Makhubela-Mashele was reelected for another term in 2024.
