= Kenny Mmoiemang =

South African politician (born 1967)

Kenny Mmoiemang MP

Permanent delegate to the National Council of Provinces from the Northern Cape
- Incumbent
- Assumed office 23 May 2019

Speaker of the Northern Cape Provincial Legislature
- In office 4 June 2013 – 7 May 2019
- Preceded by: Jacobus Frederick van Wyk
- Succeeded by: Newrene Klaaste

Northern Cape MEC for Cooperative Governance, Human Settlements and Traditional Affairs
- In office 11 May 2009 – 4 June 2013
- Premier: Hazel Jenkins
- Succeeded by: Alvin Botes

Personal details
- Born: Mosimanegare Kenneth Mmoiemang; 5 March 1967 (age 59)
- Party: African National Congress
- Occupation: Member of Parliament
- Profession: Politician

Mosimanegare Kenneth Mmoiemang (born 5 March 1967) is a South African politician who has been a permanent delegate to the National Council of Provinces since May 2019. He is a member of the Northern Cape delegation. He was the provincial MEC for Cooperative Governance, Human Settlements and Traditional Affairs from 2009 to 2013 and the speaker of the Northern Cape Provincial Legislature from 2013 to 2019. Mmoiemang is a member of the African National Congress (ANC).

== Early life and education ==
Mmoiemang was born on 5 March 1967. He matriculated from Batlharo-Tlhaping High School in 1984. He went on to study at the University of the Witwatersrand where he obtained a B.Proc and LLB degree in 1992 and 1994, respectively. He later fulfilled a Municipal Executive Management Development Programme course at the University of the Free State in 2005. Mmoiemang started his career by being admitted to the Cape Law Society as an attorney in 1998.

== Political career ==
In 1983, he became a UDF affiliate member of the Kuruman Youth Unity (KUYINI). He joined SANSCO in 1989 and became a member of the Johannesburg South African Communist Party (SACP) branch in 1990. Mmoiemang became the chairperson of SANSCO at the University of Witwatersrand in 1991 and the SASCO secretary at the university in 1993. He was a member of both the Tswelelopele Initiative Board and the Association for Community and Rural Advancement between 1991 and 1992.

Mmoiemang was elected deputy provincial chairperson of the ANC in 2008 and joined the Northern Cape Provincial Legislature on 6 May 2009. Premier Hazel Jenkins appointed him as MEC for Cooperative Governance, Human Settlements and Traditional Affairs. He assumed the office on 11 May. He was elected speaker of the provincial legislature in June 2013, succeeding Boeboe van Wyk. He was re-elected as Speaker in May 2014. Mmoiemang retired as deputy provincial chair of the ANC in October 2017.

== Parliamentary career ==
Mmoiemang left the legislature in May 2019, as he was elected to the National Council of Provinces. He took office as an MP on 23 May. On 24 June, he received his committee assignments. He was elected Chairperson of the Transport, Public Service and Administration, Public Works and Infrastructure Select Committee on 26 June.

=== Committee assignments ===
- Joint Standing Committee on Intelligence (Member)
- Select Committee on Co-operative Governance and Traditional Affairs, Water and Sanitation and Human Settlements (Alternate Member)
- Select Committee on Petitions and Executive Undertakings (Alternate Member)
- Select Committee on Security and Justice (Alternate Member)
- Select Committee on Transport, Public Service and Administration, Public Works and Infrastructure (Member)
- Select Committee on Trade and Industry, Economic Development, Small Business Development, Tourism, Employment and Labour (chairperson)
