= National Council of Provinces =

Upper house of the Parliament of South Africa

National Council of Provinces List: 10 other official names: Nasionale Raad van Provinsies (Afrikaans); umKhandlu weNarha oNgamele iimFunda (Southern Ndebele); IBhunga leSizwe lamaPhondo (Xhosa); uMkhandlu kaZwelonke weziFundazwe (Zulu); uMkhandlu waVelonkhe wetiFundza (Swazi); Lekgotla la Bosetšhaba la Diprofense (Northern Sotho); Lekgotla la Naha la Diprofense (Sotho); Lekgotla la Bosetšhaba la Diporofense (Tswana); Huvo ya Rixaka ya Swifundzhankulu (Tsonga); Khoro ya Lushaka ya Mavunḓu (Venda)
- 28th Parliament

Type
- Type: Upper house of the Parliament of South Africa

History
- Founded: 1997; 29 years ago

Leadership
- Chairperson: Refilwe Mtsweni-Tsipane, ANC since 15 June 2024
- Deputy Chairperson: Les Govender, IFP since 9 July 2024
- Chief Whip: Kenny Mmoiemang, ANC since 15 June 2024

Structure
- Seats: 90 MPs (54 permanent, 36 special)
- Political groups: ANC (24 + 19); DA (12 + 9); EFF (8 + 2); MK (5 + 4); VF+ (2 + 0); IFP (1 + 1); PA (1 + 1); UDM (1 + 0); ActionSA (0 + 1)

Elections
- First election: 2 June 1999
- Last election: 13 and 14 June 2024
- Next election: 2029

Meeting place
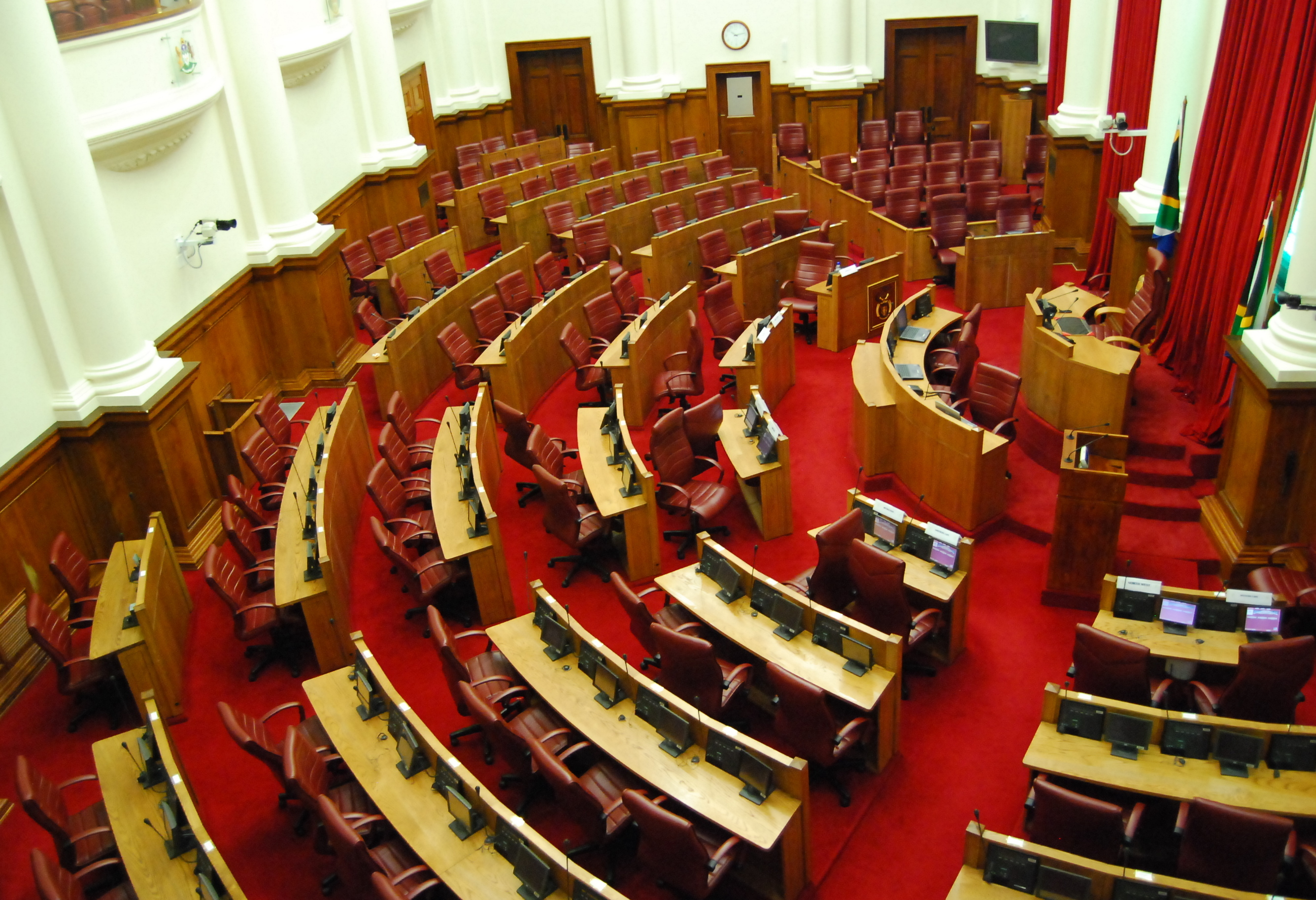
- NCOP Chamber, Houses of Parliament, Cape Town, Western Cape, South Africa

Website
- National Council of Provinces

The National Council of Provinces (NCOP) is the upper house of the Parliament of South Africa under the post-apartheid constitution which came into full effect in 1997.

It replaced the former Senate, but is very similar to that body, and to many other upper houses of legislatures throughout the world, in that its purpose is to represent the governments of the provinces, rather than directly representing the people.

The NCOP consists of 90 members of Parliament (MPs).

== Composition ==
The NCOP consists of ninety delegates, ten delegates for each of the nine provinces regardless of the population of the province. Each province is equally represented in the NCOP.

A provincial delegation is composed of six permanent delegates and four special delegates. The party representation in the delegation must proportionally reflect the party representation in the provincial legislature, based on a formula included in the Constitution of South Africa.

The permanent delegates are selected by the nine provincial legislatures. The four special delegates include the Premier of the province and three other delegates. They are nominated by each province from the members of the provincial legislature and are contingent on the subject matter being considered by the NCOP. The premier leads the province's delegation in the NCOP, but they can choose any of the other delegates to head the delegation in their absence.

The South African Local Government Association (SALGA) is also represented in the NCOP. SALGA has 10 delegates who may partake in the debates and other activities, but they do not vote.

=== Current composition ===
After the elections of 29 May 2024, the new provincial legislatures met on 13 and 14 June 2024 to elect NCOP delegations. The first sitting of the NCOP took place on 15 June 2024. The delegations elected are described in the following table.

Party	Delegate type	Province									Total	
Party	Delegate type	EC	FS	G	KZN	L	M	NW	NC	WC	Total	
African National Congress	Permanent	3	3	2	1	4	3	4	3	1	24	43
African National Congress	Special	3	2	2	1	4	2	2	2	1	19	43
Democratic Alliance	Permanent	1	1	2	1	1	1	1	1	3	12	20
Democratic Alliance	Special	1	1	1				1	1	3	8	20
Economic Freedom Fighters	Permanent	1	1	1		1	1	1	1	1	8	10
Economic Freedom Fighters	Special						1	1			2	10
UMkhonto WeSizwe	Permanent			1	3		1				5	9
UMkhonto WeSizwe	Special		1		2		1				4	9
Freedom Front Plus	Permanent		1						1		2	2
Inkatha Freedom Party	Permanent				1						1	2
Inkatha Freedom Party	Special				1						1	2
Patriotic Alliance	Permanent									1	1	2
Patriotic Alliance	Special								1		1	2
United Democratic Movement	Permanent	1									1	1
ActionSA	Special			1							1	1
Total		10	10	10	10	10	10	10	10	10	90	

=== Population per delegate ===
Province	2022 census population	Population per delegate
Eastern Cape	7,230,204	723,020.4
Free State	2,964,412	296,441.2
Gauteng	15,099,422	1,509,942.2
KwaZulu-Natal	12,423,907	1,242,390.7
Limpopo	6,572,720	657,272.0
Mpumalanga	5,143,324	514,332.4
North West	3,804,548	380,454.8
Northern Cape	1,355,946	135,594.6
Western Cape	7,433,019	743,301.9
South Africa	62,027,503	689,194.5

== Role in the legislative process ==
The NCOP may consider, amend, propose amendments to, or reject the legislation. It must consider all national bills, and also has the power to initiate legislation in the functional areas where Parliament and the provincial legislatures have concurrent legislative power.

The NCOP has four decision-making mechanisms depending on the type of bill:

- Section 74 bills; they may not deal with any matters other than constitutional amendments and matters related to the amendments. A bill that amends section 1 of the constitution (which defines South Africa as a constitutional democratic republic), or amends the Bill of Rights, or amends any constitutional provision affecting the NCOP itself, provincial boundaries or powers, or other specifically provincial matters, must be passed by the NCOP. Each delegation has one vote, and six of the nine delegations must approve the bill for it to pass. Other constitutional amendments do not have to be passed by the NCOP, but they must be debated publicly in the NCOP.
- Section 75 Bills; These bills are managed with regard to the process specified in section 75 of the Constitution. When voting on these Bills, delegates vote individually. The Bill is approved when a simple majority of delegates vote for the Bill.
- Section 76 Bills; Bills that concern the provinces are mainly those that correlate with areas of combined national and provincial legislative powers. These Bills are dealt with in the provision of the procedure in section 76 of the Constitution. When voting on these bills, the nine provincial delegations vote in line with the instruction communicated to them by their respective provincial legislatures. Each delegation has one vote. The Bill is approved if a majority of delegations vote for the Bill.
- Section 77 Bills; These are Bills which cover the appropriation of money, the enactment of national taxes, levies, duties or surcharges. They are handled with reference to the process delineated in section 77 of the Constitution. Delegates vote individually. The Bill is accepted when the majority of delegates vote to approve it.

== Office bearers ==
=== Chairperson and deputy chairperson ===
The office of President of the Senate was succeeded by the office of chairperson of the National Council of Provinces in 1997. The inaugural holder of the position was Mosiuoa Lekota. He served as chairperson from 1997 to 1999. The chairperson is elected from the permanent delegates for a five-year term. The election of the chairperson is presided over by the Chief Justice of South Africa. The Chief Justice can, however, designate another judge to preside. The chairperson, in turn, presides over the other elections that takes place in the chamber. The legislative body also elects a permanent deputy chairperson. A second deputy chairperson is elected for a one-year term. The position rotates between the nine provinces, enabling the provinces to have its members elected second deputy chairpersos.,

The chairperson chairs all the sittings of the National Council of the Provinces. If the chairperson is not present at the sittings, the deputy chairperson or House Chairpersons can preside over the sitting of the chamber.

The current chairperson is Refilwe Mtsweni-Tsipane who took office on 15 June 2024. The following people have served as chairperson of the NCOP:

No.	Portrait	Name (Birth–Death)	Term of office			Political party
No.	Portrait	Name (Birth–Death)	Took office	Left office	Time in office	Political party
1		Mosiuoa Lekota (1948–2026)	6 February 1997	21 June 1999	2 years, 135 days	African National Congress
2		Naledi Pandor (born 1953)	21 June 1999	4 May 2004	4 years, 318 days	African National Congress
3		Joyce Kgoali (1950–2004)	4 May 2004	21 November 2004 (Died in office)	201 days	African National Congress
4		Mninwa Johannes Mahlangu (1952–2025)	17 January 2005; Acting since 21 November 2004	22 May 2014	9 years, 125 days	African National Congress
5		Thandi Modise (born 1959)	22 May 2014	22 May 2019	5 years	African National Congress
6		Amos Masondo (born 1953)	23 May 2019	28 May 2024	5 years, 5 days	African National Congress
7		Refilwe Mtsweni-Tsipane (born 1973)	15 June 2024	Incumbent	2 years, 111 days	African National Congress

=== Chairperson of the Committees ===
The chairperson of the committees is appointed by the members of the legislature. The position holds the following roles, including presiding over the meeting of the committee of chairpersons, approve the budget and expenditures of the committees and to preside over sittings of the House, when requested or when the chairperson and deputy chairperson are not available.

=== Chief Whips and Party Whips ===
Whips represent their individual parties' interests and ensure the discipline of their members. They also ensure that their parties function effectively. There are two Chief Whips who are official office bearers, the Chief Whip of the majority party and the Chief Whip of the largest opposition party. The smaller parties have Senior Whips assisted by a number of whips. The Chief Whips are formally appointed by the chairperson. The Chief Whip of the majority party is responsible for the detailed arrangement of the legislative business.

=== Leader of the Opposition ===
The position is designated to the leader of the largest opposition party in the legislature. Cathlene Labuschagne of the Democratic Alliance has been serving as Leader of the Opposition since her election in September 2016.

== See also ==
- Provincial legislature (South Africa)
- List of National Council of Provinces members of the 28th Parliament of South Africa
- Federalism
- National Assembly of South Africa
