= Vaalharts Valley =

Valley in South Africa

Coordinates: 27.92°S 24.80°E

The Vaalharts Valley is located in the north-east corner of the Northern Cape province of South Africa, bordering the North West province. It gets its name because it is located between two rivers, the Vaal and the Harts. Because of its advantageous position between the two rivers, an irrigation scheme was built in the Vaalharts Valley in the 1930s.

Several towns are located in the valley, including Christiana, Jan Kempdorp, Warrenton, Hartswater, Taung, Windsorton, Barkly West, and Delportshoop.

== History ==
The Vaalharts Valley was formed millions of years ago by a glacier, resulting in fertile arable land. In the late 19th century, the area was ruled by Chief Galeshewe, who repeatedly clashed with the Cape Colony government. Galeshewe led an uprising in 1897 and was consequently arrested. Because of his activism, his land was later confiscated by the government. The Vaalharts Irrigation Scheme was built on Chief Galeshewe's land in the Vaalharts Valley.

In 1886, before the construction of the irrigation scheme, Cecil John Rhodes wanted to divert the water from the Harts River to the diamond fields at Kimberley. He was granted land for this venture but could not raise the necessary funds, and the government was not willing to fund the project.

The irrigation scheme in the valley was designed to combat the economic effects on white settlers of the Anglo Boer War, the rinderpest epizootic of 1896–97, and the Great Depression. The idea was to re-direct water from the Vaal and Harts rivers into a series of canals and breathe life into the notoriously dry landscape. Development of the valley started in 1934; the damming of the Vaal River by the Department of Water Affairs was completed in 1938, and 80 farmers were originally moved into the area.

The irrigation canals were for the most part dug manually. The workers' medical care was free, and their clothing and other necessities were subsidized by the government. Recreational and cultural opportunities were also provided, including various educational and sport activities, as well as a small church.

== Geology ==
The sedimentary strata that make up most of the valley's geology are of similar age to those of the Karoo, but the basement rocks appear to be Precambrian igneous formations. Natural drainage of the soil is poor because of the flat topographical gradient and the soil profiles typical of the area.

== Fauna and flora ==
Common birds in the valley include guineafowl, Swainson's spurfowl, Orange River francolin, Namaqua sandgrouse, and a variety of pigeons and doves. The irrigation canals and reservoirs support many waterbirds, including migrants from places as far as the Kafue Flats in Zambia and the Okavango Delta marshes in Botswana.

The landscape is open savanna (specifically Kalahari thornveld), with an abundance of camelthorn trees. Other trees and shrubs include acacias with names like "Katdoring", "Haak-en-Steek", and "Trassiebos"; Tarchonanthus camphoratus; Vachellia tortilis; and Grewia flava (raisin bush).

The diversity of the area's vegetation and birdlife is attributable to its location at a meeting place of the Kalahari thornveld, the grasslands of the Highveld, and the Karoo.

== Farming ==
Today, the system of concrete canals irrigates 1,280 farms. The Vaalharts Valley is probably the largest irrigation scheme in the Southern Hemisphere. Produce grown in the area includes olives, pecans, peanuts, citrus, wine, cotton, and various stone fruits. The first olive trees were planted in 1995 and at present there are over 200,000 trees of over 60 varieties. Wheat, maize, and grain are also grown in the area.

== Vaalharts Museum ==
Located in Jan Kempdorp, the Vaalharts Museum houses a vintage car collection, as well as agricultural equipment tracing the history of farming in the area, from ancient ox-driven ploughs to Ford and John Deere tractors dating back half a century.
