= Hartswater =

- Location within Northern Cape Location within South Africa
- Coordinates: 27°46′S 24°49′E
- Country: South Africa
- Province: Northern Cape
- District: Frances Baard
- Municipality: Phokwane

Area
  - Total: 10.77 km^{2} (4.16 sq mi)

Population (2011)
  - Total: 10,465
  - Density: 971.7/km^{2} (2,517/sq mi)

Racial makeup (2011)
  - Black African: 56.3%
  - Coloured: 30.2%
  - Indian/Asian: 0.6%
  - White: 12.0%
  - Other: 1.0%

First languages (2011)
  - Afrikaans: 47.8%
  - Tswana: 37.9%
  - English: 7.8%
  - Xhosa: 1.8%
  - Other: 4.7%
- Time zone: UTC+2 (SAST)
- Postal code (street): 8570
- PO box: 8570
- Area code: 053

Hartswater is an agricultural town on the N18 national route some 23 km south of Taung and 36 km north of Warrenton. The centre of the Vaalharts Irrigation Scheme, it became a municipality in April 1960. It takes its name from the Harts River which passes to the west of the town.

== Background ==
The town was laid out in 1948. There is a monument built in the shape of a miniature church dedicated to the women of Vaalharts for their contribution towards building and developing the Vaalharts irrigation scheme located in the town of Hartswater.

Hartswater is centrally located to Jan Kempdorp, Pampierstad, Ganspan, Taung and Christiana.
