= N18 (South Africa) =

National road in South Africa

National route N18

Route information
- Maintained by SANRAL
- Length: 317 km (197 mi)

Major junctions
- South end: N12 at Warrenton
- N14 at Vryburg
- North end: A1 at the Botswana border at Ramatlabama

Location
- Country: South Africa
- Provinces: Northern Cape, North West
- Major cities: Vryburg, Mahikeng

Highway system
- Numbered routes of South Africa
← N17	→ N21

The N18 is a national route in South Africa which runs from Warrenton through Vryburg and Mahikeng to Ramatlabama on the border with Botswana.

The N18 national route of South Africa is part of Trans-African Highway Network no. 4 (Cairo-Cape Town Highway), which connects Cairo with Cape Town.

== Route ==
Detailed Route

=== Northern Cape ===
The N18 begins as a t-junction with the N12 in Warrenton. The road heads west as the town's main road, leaving it to the north-west and crossing the Vaal River before turning northwards. Passing the Ganspan Airport to the west, the N18 enters Jan Kempdorp from the south and meets the R370 and the R708. Leaving the town, it continues northwards, passing Hartswater. Shortly afterwards it crosses into North West Province.

=== North West ===
It reaches Taung, where it crosses the Harts River before the R372 intersects from the west. It continues northwards, passing Pudimoe and after some distance, it enters Vryburg from the south as Moffat Street. Inside the town, it continues north, crossing the east-west N14 Market Street before leaving the town. Continuing north-east for 159 km, through Stella (where it meets the R377 at a staggered junction) and Setlagole, it enters Mafikeng from the south-west as the Vryburg Road. Crossing the railway into the town, it becomes two one-way streets (Main Street eastwards and Shippard Street westwards) before reaching a junction in the centre of the town, where it meets the R503 and the R49. Turning north-west as Nelson Mandela Drive, it heads through the northern suburbs of Mafikeng and heads northwards for 24 km to the Ramatlabama Border post with Botswana. On the Botswana side, it becomes the A1 highway to Lobatse and Gaborone.
