= Sydney on Vaal =

- Location within Northern Cape Location within South Africa
- Coordinates: 28.441°S 24.316°E
- Country: South Africa
- Province: Northern Cape
- District: Frances Baard
- Municipality: Dikgatlong

Area
  - Total: 0.59 km^{2} (0.23 sq mi)

Population (2011)
  - Total: 33
  - Density: 56/km^{2} (140/sq mi)

Racial makeup (2011)
  - Black African: 3.0%
  - Coloured: 24.2%
  - White: 72.7%

First languages (2011)
  - Afrikaans: 75.8%
  - English: 21.2%
  - Xhosa: 3.0%
- Time zone: UTC+2 (SAST)

Sydney on Vaal is a ghost-town in Frances Baard District Municipality in the Northern Cape province of South Africa. The village lies 30 km northwest of Barkly West and several kilometres south of Delportshoop. It was founded in 1902 and is variously said to be named after Sidney Mendelssohn, Director of the Vaal River Diamond and Exploration Company which owned the land, as well as after its situation on the Vaal River, and after Sidney Shippard, Acting Attorney of the Executive Council of Griqualand West in 1872.
