= Ulco =

- Location within Northern Cape Location within South Africa
- Coordinates: 28.316667°S 24.216667°E
- Country: South Africa
- Province: Northern Cape
- District: Frances Baard
- Municipality: Dikgatlong
- Established: 1949

Area
  - Total: 9.86 km^{2} (3.81 sq mi)

Population (2011)
  - Total: 860
  - Density: 87/km^{2} (230/sq mi)

Racial makeup (2011)
  - Black African: 63.4%
  - Coloured: 15.2%
  - Indian/Asian: 0.5%
  - White: 19.0%
  - Other: 2.0%

First languages (2011)
  - Tswana: 55.7%
  - Afrikaans: 35.9%
  - English: 2.2%
  - Sotho: 2.1%
  - Other: 4.1%
- Time zone: UTC+2 (SAST)
- Postal code (street): 8390
- PO box: 8390
- Area code: 053

Ulco is a town in Frances Baard District Municipality in the Northern Cape province of South Africa. It lies 10 kilometers from the Vaal River.

== Established ==
The town was established around the mining activities Union Lime Company in 1949. The town is some 15 km northwest of Delportshoop and 60 km west-southwest of Warrenton.

== Naming ==
The name is derived from Union Lime Company.

== Nature of town ==
It is a self-sustaining and private cement and mining town, which was established to offer housing to its employees. Electricity was also supplied to the area in 1949 for the first time.

== Activities ==
It is a site of extensive lime works. In 2009 it still had reserves for 150 years.

== Schools ==
Two school exist namely Ulco Intermediate School and Ulco Primary School.

== Weather ==
Highest temperature ever measured is 44 °C and coldest -9 °C . It has a desert like climate
