= Ritchie, South Africa =

Ritchie
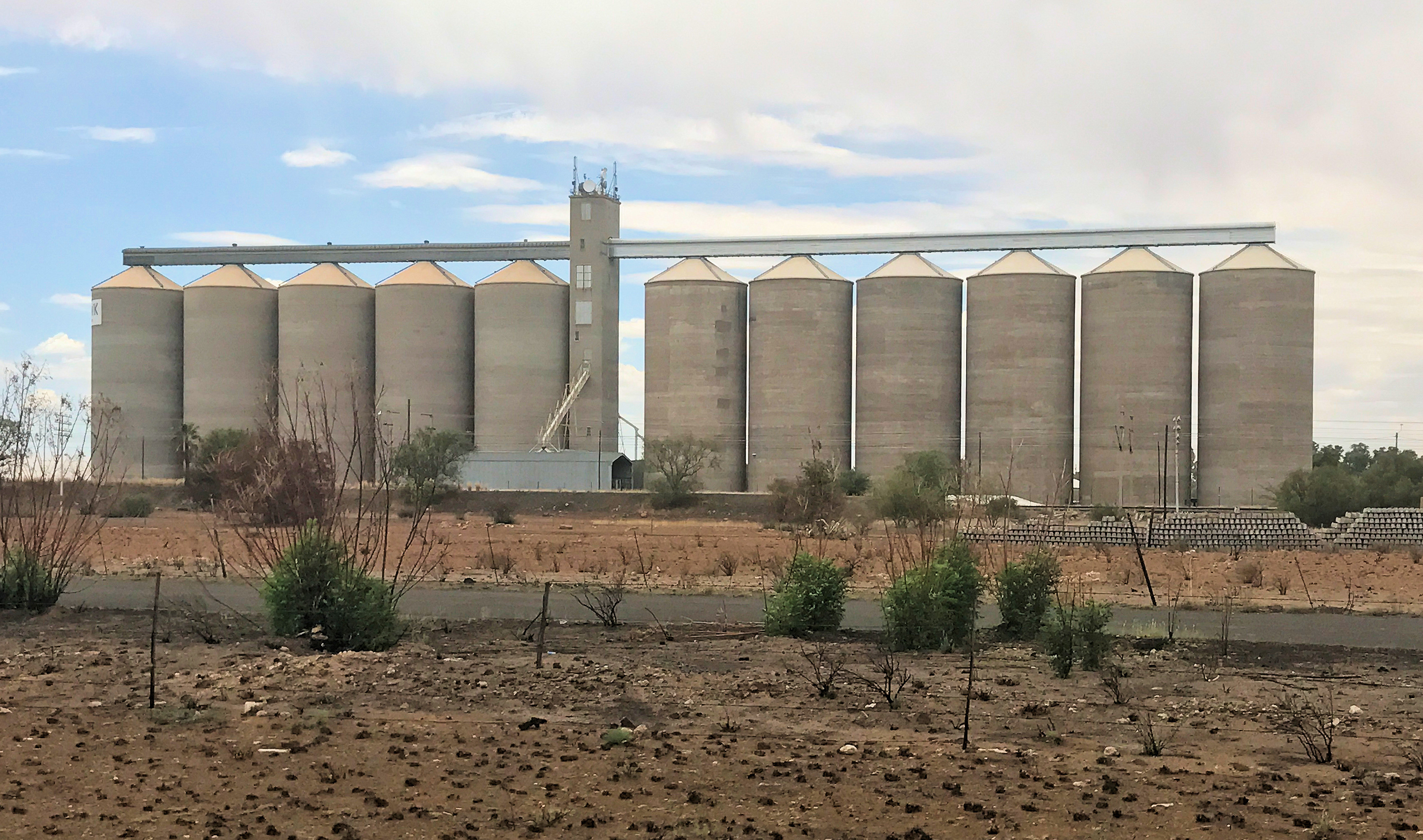
- Grain silos at Modder River Station

- Location within Northern Cape Location within South Africa
- Coordinates: 29.05°S 24.6°E
- Country: South Africa
- Province: Northern Cape
- District: Frances Baard
- Municipality: Sol Plaatje

Area
  - Total: 24.8 km^{2} (9.6 sq mi)

Population (2011)
  - Total: 14,850
  - Density: 599/km^{2} (1,550/sq mi)

Racial makeup (2011)
  - Black African: 50.9%
  - Coloured: 45.4%
  - Indian/Asian: 0.8%
  - White: 2.1%
  - Other: 0.7%

First languages (2011)
  - Afrikaans: 87.6%
  - Tswana: 6.3%
  - Xhosa: 1.8%
  - Sotho: 1.6%
  - Other: 2.7%
- Time zone: UTC+2 (SAST)
- Postal code (street): 8701
- PO box: 8701
- Area code: +27 (0)53

Ritchie is a small town situated 40 kilometres (20 mi) south of Kimberley on the north bank of the Riet River in the Northern Cape province of South Africa. The town, with a population of approximately 15,000, is in the Sol Plaatje Local Municipality, which forms part of the Frances Baard District Municipality.

== Demographics ==
According to the 2011 census, the town of Ritchie proper has a population of 7,610, while the adjacent township of Motswedimosa has a population of 7,240, giving the urban area a population of 14,850. Of this population 50.9% described themselves as "Black African", 45.4% as "Coloured" and 2.1% as "White". 87.6% spoke Afrikaans as their home language, 6.3% spoke Tswana, 1.8% spoke Xhosa and 1.6% spoke Sotho.
