= Delportshoop =

- Location within Northern Cape Location within South Africa
- Coordinates: 28.416667°S 24.3°E
- Country: South Africa
- Province: Northern Cape
- District: Frances Baard
- Municipality: Dikgatlong
- Established: 1871

Area
  - Total: 67.8 km^{2} (26.2 sq mi)

Population (2011)
  - Total: 10,346
  - Density: 153/km^{2} (395/sq mi)

Racial makeup (2011)
  - Black African: 30.9%
  - Coloured: 33.4%
  - Indian/Asian: 1.0%
  - White: 2.9%
  - Other: 31.9%

First languages (2011)
  - Tswana: 49.4%
  - Afrikaans: 43.0%
  - English: 1.9%
  - Zulu: 1.2%
  - Other: 4.6%
- Time zone: UTC+2 (SAST)
- Postal code (street): 8377
- PO box: 8377
- Area code: 053

Delportshoop is a town in Frances Baard District Municipality in the Northern Cape Province of South Africa. It lies next to the Vaal River. The Harts River runs by closely.

== Early settlement ==
It developed from a diamond-diggers’ camp. The public diggings were proclaimed in November 1871, a village management board was instituted in 1931, and municipal status attained in 1970.

== Name ==
Delportshoop was originally called “Thomas Hope”, but later the name was changed to “Delport’s Hope” . The first Prosecutor was P.J. Marais. He farmed on Langberg in the region. Marais were told a story that the first diamond was find by a young man whose surname was Delport. The diamond diggers then changed it to Delport’s Hope. Later the ‘’Hope’’, became ‘’Hoop’’.

== Schools ==
• Delportshoop Primary School

• Dikgatlong Secondary School

• Francis Mohapanele Primary School

• Delportshoop High School Children from Ulco, the mining community nearby attend this school

== Vaalharts Irrigation Scheme ==
The Vaalharts Irrigation Scheme is a very large water irrigation scheme. This is run out of Delportshoop.

== Tswana names ==
Two Tswana names for Delportshoop are encountered, namely Tsineng, also spelt Tsining, Tsening, Tsenin and Tsoneng, and Dikgathlong, also spelt Dekhath-long, Dekatlong, Dekgathlong, Dikgatlhong, Makgatlhanong, Likatlong and Likhat-lhong. The latter name means ‘meeting-place’, referring to the confluence of the Vaal and Harts rivers there. Other commonly used Setswana names are Motse Moshate and Shate.
