= Dikgatlong Local Municipality elections =

The Dikgatlong Local Municipality municipal council consists of fifteen members elected by mixed-member proportional representation. Eight councillors are elected by first-past-the-post voting in eight wards, while the remaining seven are chosen from party lists so that the total number of party representatives is proportional to the number of votes received.

In the election of 3 August 2016 the African National Congress (ANC) won a majority of nine seats on the council. In the election of 1 November 2021 the African National Congress (ANC) won a reduced majority of eight seats on the council.

== Results ==
The following table shows the composition of the council after past elections.

Event	ANC	DA	EFF	PA	Other	Total
2000 election	9	2	-	-	2	13
2006 election	9	1	-	-	3	13
2011 election	10	2	-	-	1	13
2016 election	9	2	2	-	0	13
2021 election	8	1	3	2	1	15

== December 2000 election ==
The following table shows the results of the 2000 election.

Party	Ward			List			Total seats
Party	Votes	%	Seats	Votes	%	Seats	Total seats
African National Congress	6,955	65.26	7	7,025	66.38	2	9
Barkly West Task Team	1,548	14.53	0	1,902	17.97	2	2
Democratic Alliance	1,654	15.52	0	1,656	15.65	2	2
Independent candidates	500	4.69	0				0
Total	10,657	100.00	7	10,583	100.00	6	13
Valid votes	10,657	96.09		10,583	95.73		
Invalid/blank votes	434	3.91		472	4.27		
Total votes	11,091	100.00		11,055	100.00		
Registered voters/turnout	18,289	60.64		18,289	60.45		

== March 2006 election ==
The following table shows the results of the 2006 election.

Party	Ward			List			Total seats
Party	Votes	%	Seats	Votes	%	Seats	Total seats
African National Congress	7,688	71.89	7	7,648	71.59	2	9
Barkly West Task Team	1,335	12.48	0	1,312	12.28	2	2
Democratic Alliance	1,001	9.36	0	991	9.28	1	1
Independent Democrats	331	3.10	0	309	2.89	1	1
African Christian Democratic Party	258	2.41	0	298	2.79	0	0
Pan Africanist Congress of Azania	81	0.76	0	125	1.17	0	0
Total	10,694	100.00	7	10,683	100.00	6	13
Valid votes	10,694	97.34		10,683	97.07		
Invalid/blank votes	292	2.66		322	2.93		
Total votes	10,986	100.00		11,005	100.00		
Registered voters/turnout	19,602	56.05		19,602	56.14		

== May 2011 election ==
The following table shows the results of the 2011 election.

Party	Ward			List			Total seats
Party	Votes	%	Seats	Votes	%	Seats	Total seats
African National Congress	9,302	71.19	7	9,862	75.12	3	10
Democratic Alliance	1,919	14.69	0	2,057	15.67	2	2
Congress of the People	1,014	7.76	0	1,004	7.65	1	1
Independent candidates	595	4.55	0				0
Azanian People's Organisation	236	1.81	0	206	1.57	0	0
Total	13,066	100.00	7	13,129	100.00	6	13
Valid votes	13,066	97.22		13,129	97.69		
Invalid/blank votes	373	2.78		311	2.31		
Total votes	13,439	100.00		13,440	100.00		
Registered voters/turnout	21,517	62.46		21,517	62.46		

== August 2016 election ==
The following table shows the results of the 2016 election.

Party	Ward			List			Total seats
Party	Votes	%	Seats	Votes	%	Seats	Total seats
African National Congress	9,059	66.28	7	9,078	66.97	2	9
Democratic Alliance	2,363	17.29	0	2,410	17.78	2	2
Economic Freedom Fighters	1,640	12.00	0	1,680	12.39	2	2
Freedom Front Plus	189	1.38	0	190	1.40	0	0
Congress of the People	170	1.24	0	198	1.46	0	0
Independent candidates	246	1.80	0				0
Total	13,667	100.00	7	13,556	100.00	6	13
Valid votes	13,667	98.15		13,556	97.28		
Invalid/blank votes	257	1.85		379	2.72		
Total votes	13,924	100.00		13,935	100.00		
Registered voters/turnout	22,639	61.50		22,639	61.55		

== November 2021 election ==
The following table shows the results of the 2021 election.

Party	Ward			List			Total seats
Party	Votes	%	Seats	Votes	%	Seats	Total seats
African National Congress	6,397	50.79	8	6,366	51.36	0	8
Economic Freedom Fighters	2,164	17.18	0	2,174	17.54	3	3
Patriotic Alliance	1,292	10.26	0	1,365	11.01	2	2
Democratic Alliance	1,088	8.64	0	1,066	8.60	1	1
Dikgatlong Independed Forum	505	4.01	0	709	5.72	1	1
Dikgatlong Service Delivery Forum	322	2.56	0	332	2.68	0	0
Independent candidates	464	3.68	0				0
Freedom Front Plus	221	1.75	0	209	1.69	0	0
African Transformation Movement	59	0.47	0	73	0.59	0	0
Azanian People's Organisation	58	0.46	0	46	0.37	0	0
Congress of the People	26	0.21	0	55	0.44	0	0
Total	12,596	100.00	8	12,395	100.00	7	15
Valid votes	12,596	97.84		12,395	97.62		
Invalid/blank votes	278	2.16		302	2.38		
Total votes	12,874	100.00		12,697	100.00		
Registered voters/turnout	22,617	56.92		22,617	56.14		

=== By-elections from November 2021 ===
The following by-elections were held to fill vacant ward seats in the period from November 2021. In ward 6, the ANC candidate died in a car accident. In the subsequent by-election, the ANC candidate retained the ward for the party with an increased share of the vote.

Date	Ward	Party of the previous councillor	Party of the newly elected councillor
8 February 2023	6	African National Congress	African National Congress
