= Ken Viljoen =

South African cricketer (1910–1974)

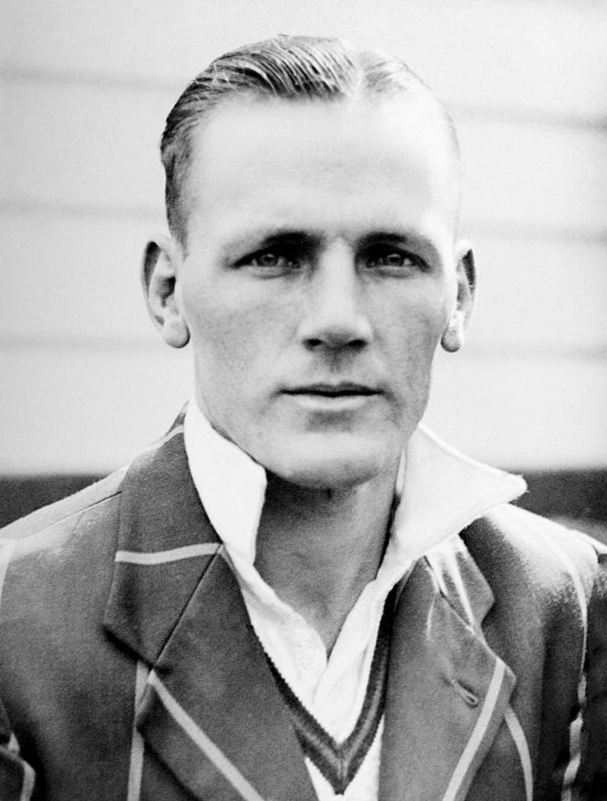
- Viljoen in 1935

Personal information
- Born: 14 May 1910; Windsorton, South Africa
- Died: 21 January 1974 (aged 63); Krugersdorp, South Africa
- Batting: Right-handed
- Bowling: Right-arm

International information
- National side: South Africa
- Test debut: 24 December 1930 v England
- Last Test: 5 March 1949 v England

Career statistics
Competition	Test	First-class
Matches	27	133
Runs scored	1365	7,964
Batting average	28.43	43.28
100s/50s	2/9	23/30
Top score	124	215
Balls bowled	48	1,820
Wickets	0	29
Bowling average	–	24.89
5 wickets in innings	–	0
10 wickets in match	–	0
Best bowling	–	4/23
Catches/stumpings	5/–	50/–
- Source: Cricinfo, 14 November 2022

Kenneth George Viljoen (14 May 1910 – 21 January 1974) was a South African cricketer who played in 27 Test matches from 1930–31 to 1948–49. Making his Test debut in 1930, he played his first and last Tests against England. He was later a manager of post–World War II South African teams. He was born in Windsorton, Cape Province, and died in Krugersdorp, Transvaal.
