= Phokwane Local Municipality elections =

Elections for a municipality in South Africa

The Phokwane Local Municipality council consists of nineteen members elected by mixed-member proportional representation. Ten councillors are elected by first-past-the-post voting in ten wards, while the remaining nine are chosen from party lists so that the total number of party representatives is proportional to the number of votes received. In the election of 1 November 2021 the African National Congress (ANC) won a majority of ten seats, but the party lost its majority after losing a by-election on 20 April 2022 to the Economic Freedom Fighters (EFF) in a by-election on 20 April 2022.

== Results ==
The following table shows the composition of the council after past elections.

Event	ANC	APO	DA	EFF	Other	Total
2006 election	13	1	2	—	2	18
2011 election	13	1	3	—	1	18
2016 election	12	0	3	3	1	19
2021 election	10	0	2	4	3	19

== March 2006 election ==
The following table shows the results of the 2006 election.

Party	Ward			List			Total seats
Party	Votes	%	Seats	Votes	%	Seats	Total seats
African National Congress	10,855	69.15	9	11,565	73.70	4	13
Democratic Alliance	1,810	11.53	0	1,769	11.27	2	2
Azanian People's Organisation	839	5.34	0	839	5.35	1	1
Independent Democrats	594	3.78	0	697	4.44	1	1
United Christian Democratic Party	457	2.91	0	535	3.41	1	1
Independent candidates	894	5.70	0				0
African Christian Democratic Party	248	1.58	0	287	1.83	0	0
Total	15,697	100.00	9	15,692	100.00	9	18
Valid votes	15,697	97.48		15,692	97.27		
Invalid/blank votes	405	2.52		440	2.73		
Total votes	16,102	100.00		16,132	100.00		
Registered voters/turnout	29,543	54.50		29,543	54.61		

== May 2011 election ==
The following table shows the results of the 2011 election.

Party	Ward			List			Total seats
Party	Votes	%	Seats	Votes	%	Seats	Total seats
African National Congress	11,982	68.78	8	12,248	70.54	5	13
Democratic Alliance	2,825	16.22	1	2,864	16.50	2	3
Congress of the People	1,153	6.62	0	1,145	6.59	1	1
Azanian People's Organisation	901	5.17	0	850	4.90	1	1
Freedom Front Plus	374	2.15	0	255	1.47	0	0
Independent candidates	186	1.07	0				0
Total	17,421	100.00	9	17,362	100.00	9	18
Valid votes	17,421	97.62		17,362	97.70		
Invalid/blank votes	424	2.38		409	2.30		
Total votes	17,845	100.00		17,771	100.00		
Registered voters/turnout	30,022	59.44		30,022	59.19		

== August 2016 election ==
The following table shows the results of the 2016 election.

Party	Ward			List			Total seats
Party	Votes	%	Seats	Votes	%	Seats	Total seats
African National Congress	11,069	60.69	9	10,876	60.11	3	12
Democratic Alliance	3,172	17.39	1	3,190	17.63	2	3
Economic Freedom Fighters	2,428	13.31	0	2,339	12.93	3	3
African Independent Congress	569	3.12	0	730	4.03	1	1
Azanian People's Organisation	374	2.05	0	343	1.90	0	0
Freedom Front Plus	341	1.87	0	342	1.89	0	0
Congress of the People	285	1.56	0	274	1.51	0	0
Total	18,238	100.00	10	18,094	100.00	9	19
Valid votes	18,238	97.41		18,094	97.09		
Invalid/blank votes	484	2.59		542	2.91		
Total votes	18,722	100.00		18,636	100.00		
Registered voters/turnout	32,086	58.35		32,086	58.08		

== November 2021 election ==
The following table shows the results of the 2021 election.

Party	Ward			List			Total seats
Party	Votes	%	Seats	Votes	%	Seats	Total seats
African National Congress	7,509	47.05	10	7,486	47.29	0	10
Economic Freedom Fighters	3,679	23.05	0	3,746	23.67	4	4
Democratic Alliance	1,833	11.49	0	1,858	11.74	2	2
Freedom Front Plus	931	5.83	0	901	5.69	1	1
Phokwane Service Delivery Forum	498	3.12	0	571	3.61	1	1
Forum for Service Delivery	338	2.12	0	404	2.55	1	1
Patriotic Front of Azania	294	1.84	0	408	2.58	0	0
Patriotic Alliance	167	1.05	0	216	1.36	0	0
Independent candidates	372	2.33	0				0
Azanian People's Organisation	144	0.90	0	148	0.93	0	0
African People First	111	0.70	0				0
African Christian Democratic Party	48	0.30	0	56	0.35	0	0
United Christian Democratic Party	34	0.21	0	35	0.22	0	0
Total	15,958	100.00	10	15,829	100.00	9	19
Valid votes	15,958	97.23		15,829	97.28		
Invalid/blank votes	455	2.77		442	2.72		
Total votes	16,413	100.00		16,271	100.00		
Registered voters/turnout	32,409	50.64		32,409	50.21		

=== By-elections from November 2021 ===
The following by-elections were held to fill vacant ward seats in the period from November 2021.

Date	Ward	Party of the previous councillor	Party of the newly elected councillor
20 April 2022	30904003	African National Congress	Economic Freedom Fighters
