= Magareng Local Municipality elections =

The Magareng Local Municipality council consists of eleven members elected by mixed-member proportional representation. Six councillors are elected by first-past-the-post voting in six wards, while the remaining five are chosen from party lists so that the total number of party representatives is proportional to the number of votes received. In the election of 1 November 2021 the African National Congress (ANC) won a majority of six seats.

== Results ==
The following table shows the composition of the council after past elections.

Event	ANC	DA	EFF	Other	Total
2000 election	7	2	—	0	9
2006 election	7	1	—	1	9
2011 election	6	2	—	1	9
2016 election	5	2	2	0	9
2021 election	6	2	2	1	11

== December 2000 election ==
The following table shows the results of the 2000 election.

Party	Ward			List			Total seats
Party	Votes	%	Seats	Votes	%	Seats	Total seats
African National Congress	4,344	74.73	5	4,449	76.55	2	7
Democratic Alliance	1,055	18.15	0	1,114	19.17	2	2
Azanian People's Organisation	160	2.75	0	249	4.28	0	0
Independent candidates	254	4.37	0				0
Total	5,813	100.00	5	5,812	100.00	4	9
Valid votes	5,813	97.16		5,812	97.00		
Invalid/blank votes	170	2.84		180	3.00		
Total votes	5,983	100.00		5,992	100.00		
Registered voters/turnout	10,462	57.19		10,462	57.27		

== March 2006 election ==
The following table shows the results of the 2006 election.

Party	Ward			List			Total seats
Party	Votes	%	Seats	Votes	%	Seats	Total seats
African National Congress	4,801	78.19	5	4,843	79.02	2	7
Democratic Alliance	584	9.51	0	596	9.72	1	1
Independent Democrats	422	6.87	0	403	6.58	1	1
Pan Africanist Congress of Azania	138	2.25	0	141	2.30	0	0
African Christian Democratic Party	129	2.10	0	146	2.38	0	0
Independent candidates	66	1.07	0				0
Total	6,140	100.00	5	6,129	100.00	4	9
Valid votes	6,140	98.08		6,129	97.95		
Invalid/blank votes	120	1.92		128	2.05		
Total votes	6,260	100.00		6,257	100.00		
Registered voters/turnout	11,400	54.91		11,400	54.89		

== May 2011 election ==
The following table shows the results of the 2011 election.

Party	Ward			List			Total seats
Party	Votes	%	Seats	Votes	%	Seats	Total seats
African National Congress	5,173	70.51	4	5,439	73.93	2	6
Democratic Alliance	1,318	17.96	1	1,302	17.70	1	2
Congress of the People	628	8.56	0	616	8.37	1	1
Independent candidates	218	2.97	0				0
Total	7,337	100.00	5	7,357	100.00	4	9
Valid votes	7,337	97.42		7,357	97.92		
Invalid/blank votes	194	2.58		156	2.08		
Total votes	7,531	100.00		7,513	100.00		
Registered voters/turnout	11,765	64.01		11,765	63.86		

== August 2016 election ==
The following table shows the results of the 2016 election.

Party	Ward			List			Total seats
Party	Votes	%	Seats	Votes	%	Seats	Total seats
African National Congress	4,226	60.17	4	4,233	60.56	1	5
Democratic Alliance	1,281	18.24	1	1,244	17.80	1	2
Economic Freedom Fighters	1,205	17.16	0	1,227	17.55	2	2
Freedom Front Plus	145	2.06	0	168	2.40	0	0
Congress of the People	92	1.31	0	118	1.69	0	0
Independent candidates	75	1.07	0				0
Total	7,024	100.00	5	6,990	100.00	4	9
Valid votes	7,024	98.38		6,990	97.90		
Invalid/blank votes	116	1.62		150	2.10		
Total votes	7,140	100.00		7,140	100.00		
Registered voters/turnout	12,040	59.30		12,040	59.30		

== November 2021 election ==
The following table shows the results of the 2021 election.

Party	Ward			List			Total seats
Party	Votes	%	Seats	Votes	%	Seats	Total seats
African National Congress	2,989	49.02	5	3,146	51.68	1	6
Economic Freedom Fighters	1,064	17.45	0	1,400	23.00	2	2
Democratic Alliance	756	12.40	1	859	14.11	1	2
Patriotic Alliance	378	6.20	0	477	7.84	1	1
Independent candidates	716	11.74	0				0
Freedom Front Plus	159	2.61	0	160	2.63	0	0
African Christian Democratic Party	36	0.59	0	46	0.76	0	0
Total	6,098	100.00	6	6,088	100.00	5	11
Valid votes	6,098	98.29		6,088	98.04		
Invalid/blank votes	106	1.71		122	1.96		
Total votes	6,204	100.00		6,210	100.00		
Registered voters/turnout	11,644	53.28		11,644	53.33		
