= Windsorton =

- Location within Northern Cape Location within South Africa
- Coordinates: 28°20′S 24°43′E
- Country: South Africa
- Province: Northern Cape
- District: Frances Baard
- Municipality: Dikgatlong

Area
  - Total: 51.1 km^{2} (19.7 sq mi)

Population (2011)
  - Total: 6,250
  - Density: 122/km^{2} (317/sq mi)

Racial makeup (2011)
  - Black African: 67.5%
  - Coloured: 26.4%
  - Indian/Asian: 0.8%
  - White: 2.2%
  - Other: 3.2%

First languages (2011)
  - Tswana: 55.2%
  - Afrikaans: 36.5%
  - English: 1.9%
  - S. Ndebele: 1.9%
  - Other: 4.6%
- Time zone: UTC+2 (SAST)
- Postal code (street): 8510
- PO box: 8510
- Area code: 053

Windsorton is an agricultural town situated in the Vaalharts Irrigation Scheme on the banks of the Vaal River in the Northern Cape province of South Africa.

The village is located on the Vaal River, 55 km north of Kimberley, 35 km northeast of Barkly West and 40 km south-west of Warrenton. It was founded in 1869 as a diamond-diggers’ camp and was administered by a village management board. The town started as Hebron, a mission station, but when diamonds were discovered, the area was flooded with prospectors and the town became a diggers' camp. The town was renamed after P F (Peter Ford) Windsor, the original owner of the land, who was instrumental in its development.

The Khoekhoen name is Chaib, ‘place of the kudu’.
