= Sol Plaatje Local Municipality =

Sol Plaatje
- Local municipality
- The left bank of the Vaal seen from the bridge of N8

- Seal

- Location in the Northern Cape
- Coordinates: 28°50′S 24°40′E
- Country: South Africa
- Province: Northern Cape
- District: Frances Baard
- Seat: Kimberley
- Wards: 31

Government
  - Type: Municipal council
  - Mayor: Kagisho Dante Sonyoni (ANC)

Area
  - Total: 3,145 km^{2} (1,214 sq mi)

Population (2022)
  - Total: 270,078
  - Density: 85.88/km^{2} (222.4/sq mi)

Racial makeup (2022)
  - Black African: 62.0%
  - Coloured: 27.9%
  - Indian/Asian: 1.3%
  - White: 8.7%

First languages (2011)
  - Afrikaans: 45.2%
  - Tswana: 33.2%
  - English: 8.0%
  - Xhosa: 5.6%
  - Other: 8%
- Time zone: UTC+2 (SAST)
- Municipal code: NC091

Sol Plaatje Municipality (Afrikaans: Sol Plaatje Munisipaliteit; Tswana: Mmasepala wa Sol Plaatje) is a local municipality within the Frances Baard District Municipality, in the Northern Cape province of South Africa. It is named after Sol T. Plaatje. It includes the diamond mining city of Kimberley.

== Main places ==
The 2011 census divided the municipality into the following main places:

Place	Code	Area (km^{2})	Population
Galeshewe	383005	15.24	107,920
Kimberley	383006	142.77	96,977
Motswedimosa	383008	0.86	7,240
Platfontein	383004	1.77	5,185
Ritchie	383007	23.93	7,610
Roodepan	383003	6.28	20,263
Vaalbos National Park	383001	110.13	0
Non-urban areas	383002	2,844.41	2,846
Total		3,145.39	248,041

== Politics ==
The municipal council consists of sixty-five members elected by mixed-member proportional representation. Thirty-three councillors are elected by first-past-the-post voting in thirty-three wards, while the remaining thirty-two are chosen from party lists so that the total number of party representatives is proportional to the number of votes received. In the election of 1 November 2021 the African National Congress (ANC) won a majority of thirty-three seats on the council.

The following table shows the results of the election.

Sol Plaatje local election, 1 November 2021
Party	Votes				Seats		
Party	Ward	List	Total	%	Ward	List	Total
African National Congress	30,837	30,913	61,750	50.2%	27	6	33
Democratic Alliance	12,591	12,702	25,293	20.5%	6	8	14
Economic Freedom Fighters	5,600	5,994	11,594	9.4%	0	6	6
Sol- Plaatjie Service Delivery Forum	2,645	2,923	5,568	4.5%	0	3	3
Patriotic Alliance	2,577	2,834	5,411	4.4%	0	3	3
Freedom Front Plus	2,243	2,096	4,339	3.5%	0	3	3
Good	2,092	2,099	4,191	3.4%	0	2	2
Independent candidates	1,648	–	1,648	1.3%	0	–	0
African Christian Democratic Party	570	456	1,026	0.8%	0	1	1
Congress of the People	183	394	577	0.5%	0	0	0
Azanian People's Organisation	274	269	543	0.4%	0	0	0
African Transformation Movement	234	251	485	0.4%	0	0	0
Africa's New Dawn	135	147	282	0.2%	0	0	0
Spectrum National Party	129	91	220	0.2%	0	0	0
Economic Emancipation Forum	121	64	185	0.2%	0	0	0
Total	61,879	61,233	123,112		33	32	65
Valid votes	61,879	61,233	123,112	98.4%			
Spoilt votes	907	1,097	2,004	1.6%			
Total votes cast	62,786	62,330	125,116				
Voter turnout	63,026						
Registered voters	128,236						
Turnout percentage	49.1%						

=== Mayors ===
- Maria Chwarisang
- Patrick Lenyibi
- Patrick Everyday
- Agnes Ntlhangula
- David Molusi
- Mangaliso Matika
- Pule Thabane
- Patrick Mabilo
- Kagisho Dante Sonyoni
- Martha Bartlett
