= Dikgatlong Local Municipality =

Dikgatlong
- Local municipality
- Seal

- Location in the Northern Cape
- Coordinates: 28°15′S 24°15′E
- Country: South Africa
- Province: Northern Cape
- District: Frances Baard
- Seat: Barkly West
- Wards: 8

Government
  - Type: Municipal council
  - Mayor: Ruth Gopane

Area
  - Total: 7,315 km^{2} (2,824 sq mi)

Population (2022)
  - Total: 56,967
  - Density: 7.788/km^{2} (20.17/sq mi)

Racial makeup (2022)
  - Black African: 66.8%
  - Coloured: 27.6%
  - Indian/Asian: 0.7%
  - White: 4.7%

First languages (2011)
  - Tswana: 52.7%
  - Afrikaans: 39.2%
  - English: 2.1%
  - Sotho: 1.7%
  - Other: 4.3%
- Time zone: UTC+2 (SAST)
- Municipal code: NC092

Dikgatlong Municipality (Tswana: Mmasepala wa Dikgatlong; Afrikaans: Dikgatlong Munisipaliteit) is a local municipality within the Frances Baard District Municipality, in the Northern Cape province in South Africa. Dikgatlong is a Setswana name meaning "confluence", and refers to the place where the Harts and Vaal rivers flow into each other in Delportshoop. The name was used as early as 1700.

== Main places ==
The 2011 census divided the municipality into the following main places:

Place	Code	Area (km^{2})	Population
Barkly West	384013	70.6	8,258
Delportshoop	384005	66.8	4,788
Gong-Gong	384012	5.7	1,045
Holpan	384007	0.6	646
Kutlwano	384003	0.7	3,959
Longlands	384010	6.4	2,933
Mataleng	384014	2.5	11,847
Pniel Estate	384015	1.0	695
Sydney on Vaal	384009	0.6	33
Tidimalo	384006	1.0	5,558
Ulco	384004	9.9	860
Vaalbos National Park	384011	112.5	0
Vaal-Gamagara	384008	0.9	198
Windsorton	384002	50.4	2,291
Remainder	384001	6,985.2	3,727
Total		7,314.7	46,841

== Demographics ==
According to the 2022 South African census, 66.8% of the population identified as "Black African," 27.8% as "Coloured," and 4.7% as "White."

In the 2011 census, 58.5% of the population identified as "Black African," 28.5% as "Coloured," and 3.6% as "White."

== Politics ==
The municipal council consists of fifteen members elected by mixed-member proportional representation. Eight councillors are elected by first-past-the-post voting in eight wards, while the remaining seven are chosen from party lists so that the total number of party representatives is proportional to the number of votes received. In the election of 1 November 2021 the African National Congress (ANC) won a majority of eight seats on the council.

The following table shows the results of the election.

Dikgatlong local election, 1 November 2021
Party	Votes				Seats		
Party	Ward	List	Total	%	Ward	List	Total
African National Congress	6,397	6,366	12,763	51.1%	8	0	8
Economic Freedom Fighters	2,164	2,174	4,338	17.4%	0	3	3
Patriotic Alliance	1,292	1,365	2,657	10.6%	0	2	2
Democratic Alliance	1,088	1,066	2,154	8.6%	0	1	1
Dikgatlong Independed Forum	505	709	1,214	4.9%	0	1	1
Dikgatlong Service Delivery Forum	322	332	654	2.6%	0	0	0
Independent candidates	464	–	464	1.9%	0	–	0
Freedom Front Plus	221	209	430	1.7%	0	0	0
African Transformation Movement	59	73	132	0.5%	0	0	0
Azanian People's Organisation	58	46	104	0.4%	0	0	0
Congress of the People	26	55	81	0.3%	0	0	0
Total	12,596	12,395	24,991		8	7	15
Valid votes	12,596	12,395	24,991	97.7%			
Spoilt votes	278	302	580	2.3%			
Total votes cast	12,874	12,697	25,571				
Voter turnout	12,885						
Registered voters	22,617						
Turnout percentage	57.0%						
