= Jan Kempdorp =

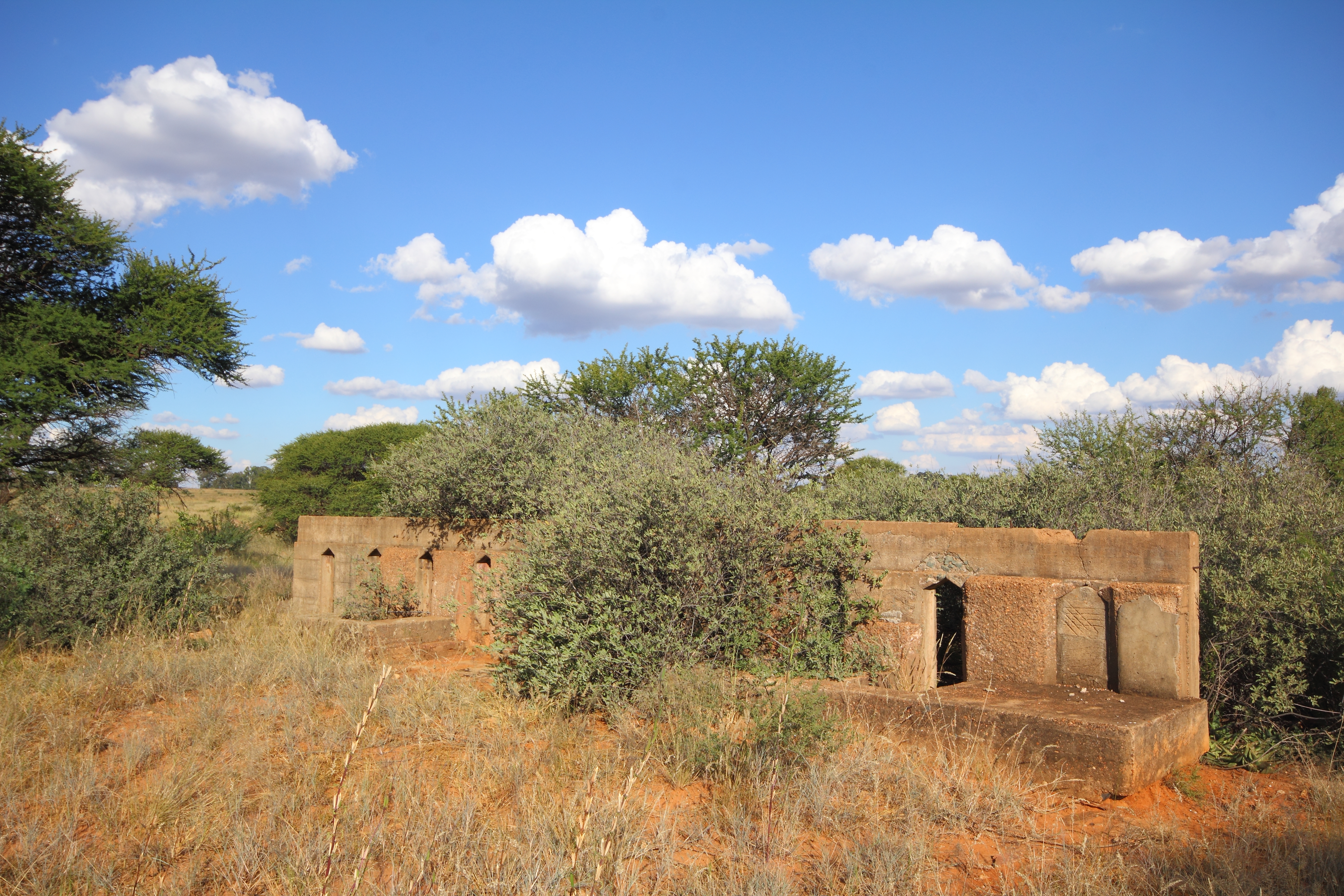
- Ruins in Jan Kempdorp

- Location within Northern Cape Location within South Africa
- Coordinates: 27°55′10″S 24°50′10″E
- Country: South Africa
- Province: Northern Cape
- District: Frances Baard
- Municipality: Phokwane

Area
  - Total: 19.07 km^{2} (7.36 sq mi)

Population (2011)
  - Total: 24,220
  - Density: 1,270/km^{2} (3,289/sq mi)

Racial makeup (2011)
  - Black African: 79.4%
  - Coloured: 12.9%
  - Indian/Asian: 0.4%
  - White: 6.8%
  - Other: 0.6%

First languages (2011)
  - Tswana: 63.7%
  - Afrikaans: 19.8%
  - Xhosa: 9.7%
  - Sotho: 1.9%
  - Other: 4.9%
- Time zone: UTC+2 (SAST)
- Postal code (street): 8550
- PO box: 8550
- Area code: 053

Jan Kempdorp is an agricultural town situated in the centre of the Vaalharts Irrigation Scheme in the Northern Cape province of South Africa. It is situated 96 kilometres (60 mi) north of Kimberley, the provincial capital, and 43 kilometres (27 mi) west of Christiana in North West province.

== History ==
Jan Kempdorp was laid out on the farm Andalustria and at first bore that name. During the Second World War it was the site of a concentration camp housing German men regarded as potentially dangerous by the authorities. The first settlers bought plots in 1938, and the town was proclaimed in 1953 and named after General Jan Kemp, a former Minister of Lands. Municipal status was attained in 1967. Originally, the border between the Cape and Transvaal provinces ran through the town, making it the only town in South Africa that was in two provinces. This also led to confusion about the administration until in 1964 it was decided by Parliament that the town would be deemed to fall in the Cape for legal purposes.

When new provincial boundaries were drawn in 1994, Jan Kempdorp was still divided, now between the Northern Cape and North West provinces. The whole of the town was, however, included in the cross-border Phokwane Local Municipality. In 2006 cross-border municipalities were eliminated and the whole of the town was included in the Northern Cape.

During South Africa's Border War Jan Kempdorp was the location of a munitions store, guarded 24 hours a day by National Servicemen who were first required to be of a lowered medical classification. The facility, designated 93 Ammunition Depot, remained active as at 2024.

== Demographics ==
According to the census of 2011, the population of Jan Kempdorp is 24,220 people, of whom 79% described themselves as "Black African", 13% as "Coloured", and 7% as "White". 64% spoke Tswana as their first language, 20% spoke Afrikaans, 10% spoke Xhosa, 2% spoke Sotho and 2% spoke English.

== Transport ==
Jan Kempdorp is located on the N18 national road, which branches from the N12 Kimberley–Johannesburg road at Warrenton and runs through Jan Kempdorp to Vryburg, Mahikeng and the Botswana border. It is also situated on a railway line that branches from the Kimberley–Johannesburg main line at Fourteen Streams and runs parallel to the N18 to Mahikeng and Botswana.

== Notable natives and residents ==
- Juanita (de Villiers) Velts: actress
