= Vryburg =

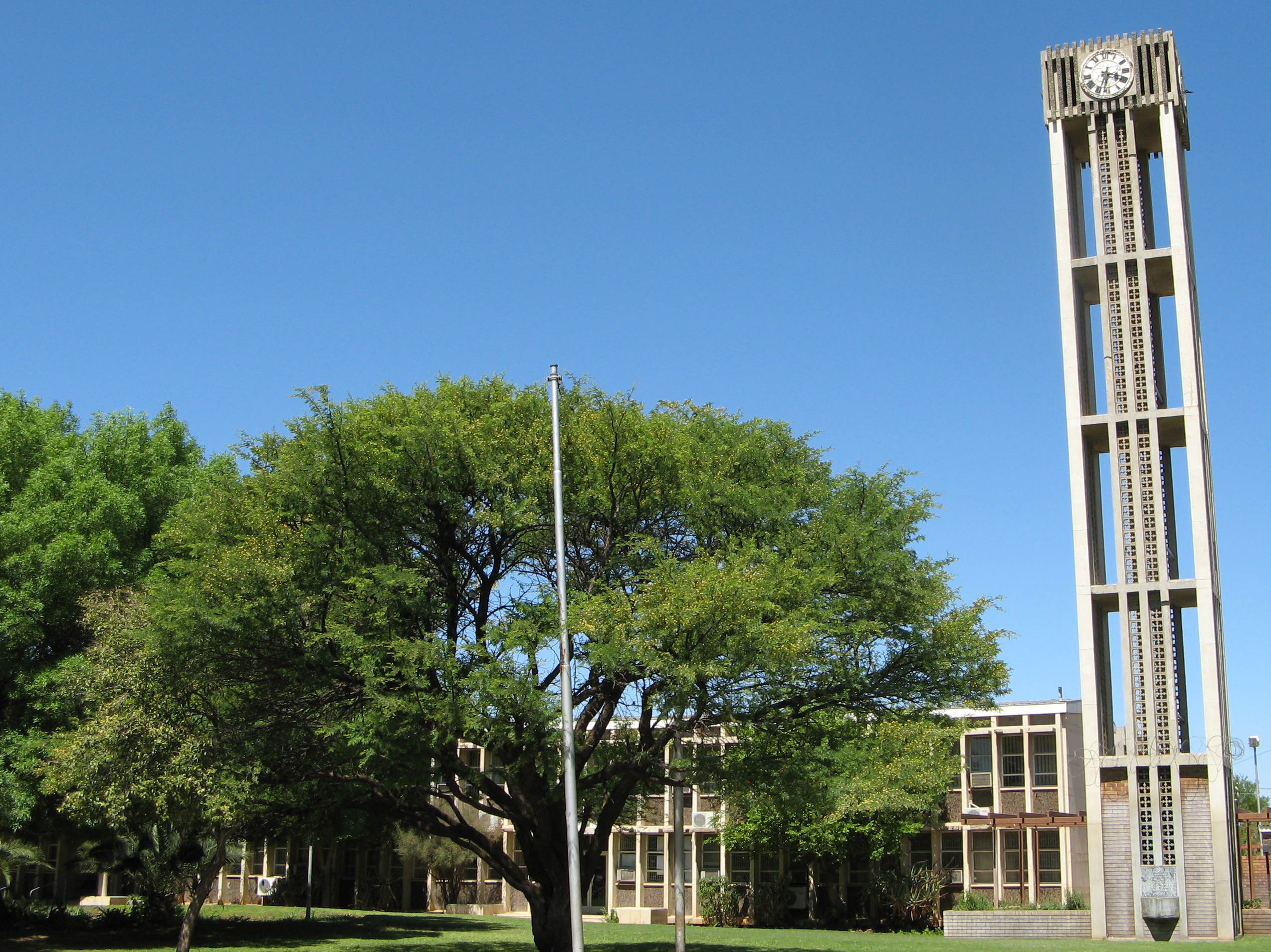
- Vryburg town hall

- Location within North West (South African province) Location within South Africa
- Coordinates: 26°57′31″S 24°43′56″E
- Country: South Africa
- Province: North West
- District: Dr Ruth Segomotsi Mompati
- Municipality: Naledi

Area
  - Total: 64.24 km^{2} (24.80 sq mi)

Population (2011)
  - Total: 21,182
  - Density: 329.7/km^{2} (854.0/sq mi)

Racial makeup (2011)
  - Black African: 40.8%
  - Coloured: 37.6%
  - Indian/Asian: 3.2%
  - White: 17.7%
  - Other: 0.7%

First languages (2011)
  - Afrikaans: 56.3%
  - Tswana: 33.0%
  - English: 6.4%
  - Other: 4.3%
- Time zone: UTC+2 (SAST)
- Postal code (street): 8601
- PO box: 8600
- Area code: 053

Vryburg (/fraɪbərɡ/) is a large agricultural town with a population of approximately 89,120 situated in the Dr Ruth Segomotsi Mompati District Municipality of the North West Province of South Africa. It is the seat and the industrial and agricultural heartland of the district of the Bophirima region.

== Location ==
The town is situated halfway between Kimberley (the capital of the Northern Cape Province) to the south and Mahikeng (the capital of the North West Province) to the north. it is at the intersection of the N18 and N14 roads.

The township of Huhudi (Tswana for “running water”) is situated just south of the town.

== History ==
=== Capital of a Republic ===
The name Vryburg comes from the period in 1882 when Vryburg was established as the capital of the Republic of Stellaland. The Republicans called themselves Vryburgers (“free citizens”), and since the Afrikaans word for “citizen” is burger and the word for “borough” (or “fortress”) is burg the name of the town followed. The first and only president was G.J. van Niekerk. A site for the township was selected and named Endvogelfontein.

On 15 November the same year, the name was changed to Vryburg. In December that year, newly laid out plots were apportioned to the volunteers by means of a lottery and by February 1883 some 400 farms had been established. The plots were taken by Afrikaners from native tribes.

On 16 August 1883, Administrator Van Niekerk proclaimed the Republic of Stellaland with Vryburg as capital and himself as president. By 1884, the town consisted of about 20 houses.

Stellaland split into two rival factions – those who supported annexation into the Cape Colony as mooted by Cecil Rhodes, and those who preferred independence.

=== British Bechuanaland ===
In February 1884, the London Convention was signed, making Stellaland a British protectorate, with the Reverend John McKenzie appointed Commissioner to British Bechuanaland.

In 1885, the British seized the town and incorporated the area into British Bechuanaland, which in turn became part of the Cape Colony in 1895.

Vryburg today is the industrial and agricultural capital of the Bophirima (Western) region.

=== Concentration camp ===
During the Second Boer War, the British built a concentration camp here to house Boer women and children.

=== London Missionary Society ===
The Tiger Kloof Native Institute was set up south of the town by the London Missionary Society in 1904. A cornerstone for the building of the institute was laid in 1905 by the Earl of Selborne. The stone church on the premises is a national monument.

=== Colony to Province ===
By 1910, the Cape Colony became the Cape Province, one of the four provinces of the Union of South Africa and later the Republic of South Africa. When nine provinces were established in 1994, Vryburg finally became part of the North West Province.

== Economy ==
=== Beef production ===
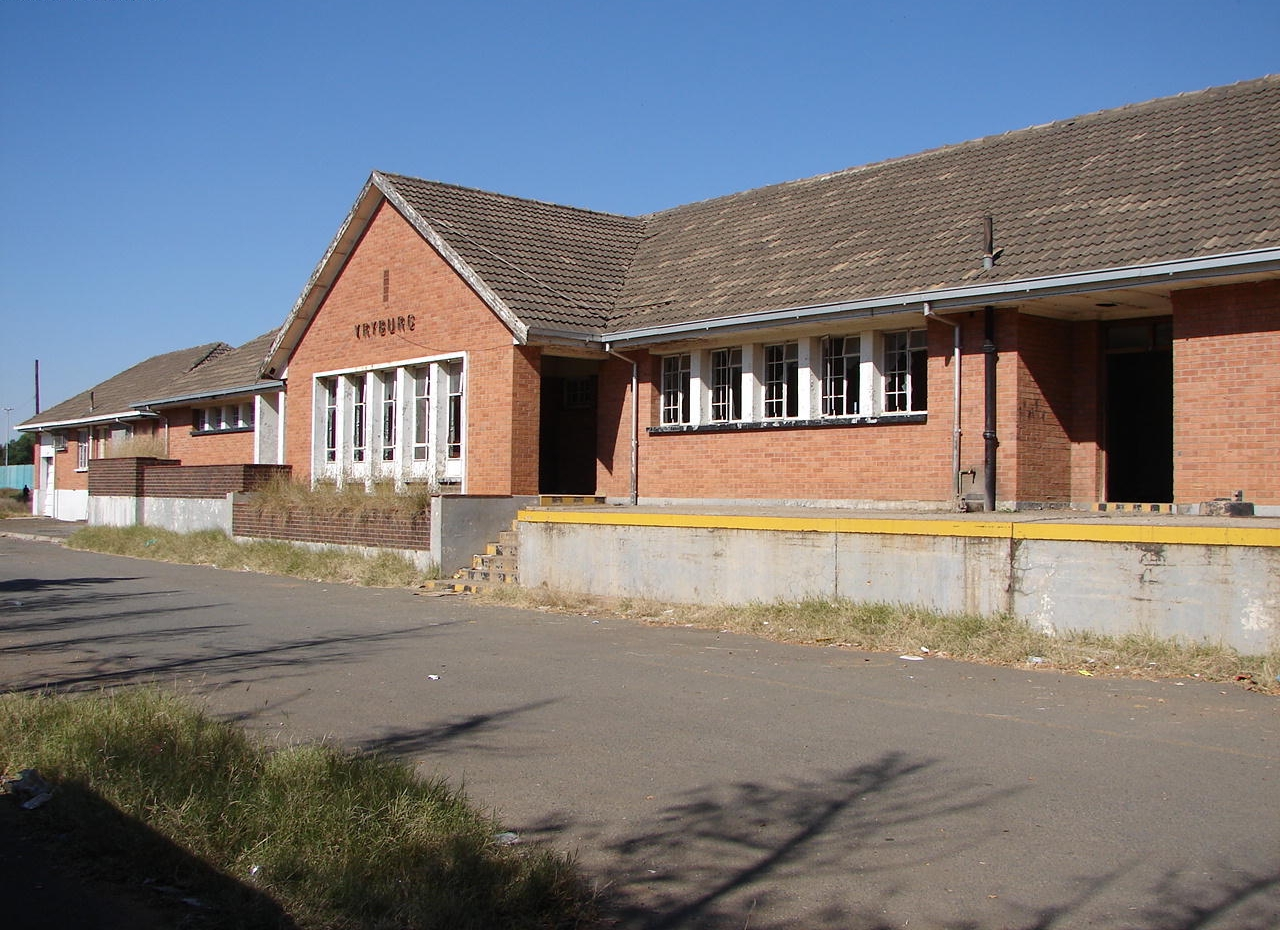
Vryburg railway station

Vryburg is South Africa's largest beef-producing district, with Bonsmara cattle the most popular. It is sometimes called "the Texas of South Africa".

=== Other produce ===
Maize and peanuts are important crops produced in the district. The town hosts South Africa's third largest agricultural show.

The town today is an industrial and agricultural hub. Its modern architecture blends naturally with its surroundings and the well-preserved old buildings are carefully maintained.

== Transport ==
The town is served by Vryburg Airport.

Vryburg is on the Cape to Cairo Railway, the main railway connecting Cape Town and Kimberley in the south with Mahikeng, Botswana and Zimbabwe. It is also at the intersection of the N14 national road (which runs from Pretoria in a southwesterly direction through Vryburg, Kuruman and Upington to the town of Springbok in the Northern Cape) and the N18 national road (which runs from Warrenton in a northerly direction through Vryburg to Mahikeng and Botswana).

== Culture ==
The Theiler Museum on the farm Armoedsvlakte, 8 km west of Vryburg, holds a collection of equipment used by Sir Arnold Theiler, the veterinarian who established the Onderstepoort veterinary research institute near Pretoria.

== Fauna and flora ==
The Leon Taljaard Nature Reserve is located north west of the town with the Swartfontein resort located adjacent to the reserve. The reserve has a number of animal species including Rhino, Eland, Buffalo, Black Wildebeest, Waterbuck and Springbuck. It is open daily to the public.

== Notable residents ==
- Jamba Ulengo (born 1990), rugby union player for the Tel Aviv Heat
- Henry Kaltenbrun (born 1897), Olympic Silver medal winner in the 100 km time trial event of the 1920 Olympic Games

== See also ==
- Vryburg High School
