= Leon Taljaard Nature Reserve =

Protected area in South Africa

- Location within North West (South African province)
- Location: Vryburg, North West, South Africa
- Nearest city: Vryburg
- Coordinates: 26°57′46″S 24°42′55″E
- Area: 856 ha (2,120 acres)
- Established: 1972

Leon Taljaard Nature Reserve is a nature reserve located north west of Vryburg, South Africa. The Swartfontein resort is located adjacent to the reserve. The reserve has a number of animal species including Rhino, Eland, Buffalo, Black Wildebeest, Waterbuck and Springbok. It is open daily to the public.

110 species of birds have been registered in the reserve.

There is a small memorial plaque and a museum here in memory of the Boer prisoners who were executed by the British army.

== History ==
The Leon Taljaard Nature Reserve was opened on 12 February 1972 by Mr. Frans D. Conradie.
