= Ganspan =

- Location within Northern Cape Location within South Africa
- Coordinates: 27.973°S 24.765°E
- Country: South Africa
- Province: Northern Cape
- District: Frances Baard
- Municipality: Phokwane

Area
  - Total: 1.22 km^{2} (0.47 sq mi)

Population (2011)
  - Total: 2,301
  - Density: 1,890/km^{2} (4,880/sq mi)

Racial makeup (2011)
  - Black African: 90.2%
  - Coloured: 9.5%
  - Indian/Asian: 0.3%

First languages (2011)
  - Tswana: 86.5%
  - Afrikaans: 8.8%
  - English: 1.3%
  - Other: 3.5%
- Time zone: UTC+2 (SAST)
- Postal code (street): 8552
- PO box: n/a

Ganspan is a town in Frances Baard District Municipality in the Northern Cape province of South Africa.
