= Pampierstad =

- Location within Northern Cape Location within South Africa
- Coordinates: 27.776°S 24.690°E
- Country: South Africa
- Province: North West 1993-2007 Northern Cape 2007-present
- District: Frances Baard
- Municipality: Phokwane

Area
  - Total: 10.39 km^{2} (4.01 sq mi)

Population (2011)
  - Total: 21,707
  - Density: 2,089/km^{2} (5,411/sq mi)

Racial makeup (2011)
  - Black African: 98.9%
  - Coloured: 0.5%
  - Indian/Asian: 0.3%
  - Other: 0.3%

First languages (2011)
  - Tswana: 83.3%
  - English: 4.7%
  - Xhosa: 4.0%
  - Afrikaans: 1.9%
  - Other: 6.0%
- Time zone: UTC+2 (SAST)
- Postal code (street): 8566
- PO box: 8566
- Area code: 053

Pampierstad is a town in Frances Baard District Municipality in the Northern Cape province of South Africa.

The town lies in the northern part of the Vaalharts irrigation scheme and 14 km from Hartswater. Residents mainly speak Tswana.

== Education ==
Pampierstad consist of 6 Primary schools, 2 Secondaries and 2 High schools

Primary Schools

1. Pabalelo
2. Bontleng
3. Gaoshupe Makodi
4. Mooki Lobelo
5. Simon Medupe
6. Kgono

Secondary Schools

1. Olehile Manchwe
2. Reitlamile

High Schools

1. Kgomotso
2. Pampierstad High
