= Taung Dam =

- Interactive map of Taung Dam
- Official name: Taung Dam
- Location: North West, South Africa
- Coordinates: 27°31′30″S 24°51′54″E
- Opening date: 1993
- Operators: Department of Water Affairs and Forestry

Dam and spillways
- Type of dam: gravity
- Impounds: Harts River
- Height: 42 metres (138 ft)
- Length: 255 metres (837 ft)

Reservoir
- Creates: Taung Dam Reservoir
- Total capacity: 58,900,000 cubic metres (2.08×10^{9} cu ft)
- Surface area: 465 hectares (1,150 acres)

Taung Dam is a gravity type dam located on the Harts River in Taung (Cokonyane), North West, South Africa. It was established in 1993 and serves mainly for irrigation purposes. Its hazard potential has been ranked high (3).

== See also ==
- List of reservoirs and dams in South Africa
- List of rivers of South Africa
