= Harts River =

Harts River Hartsrivier
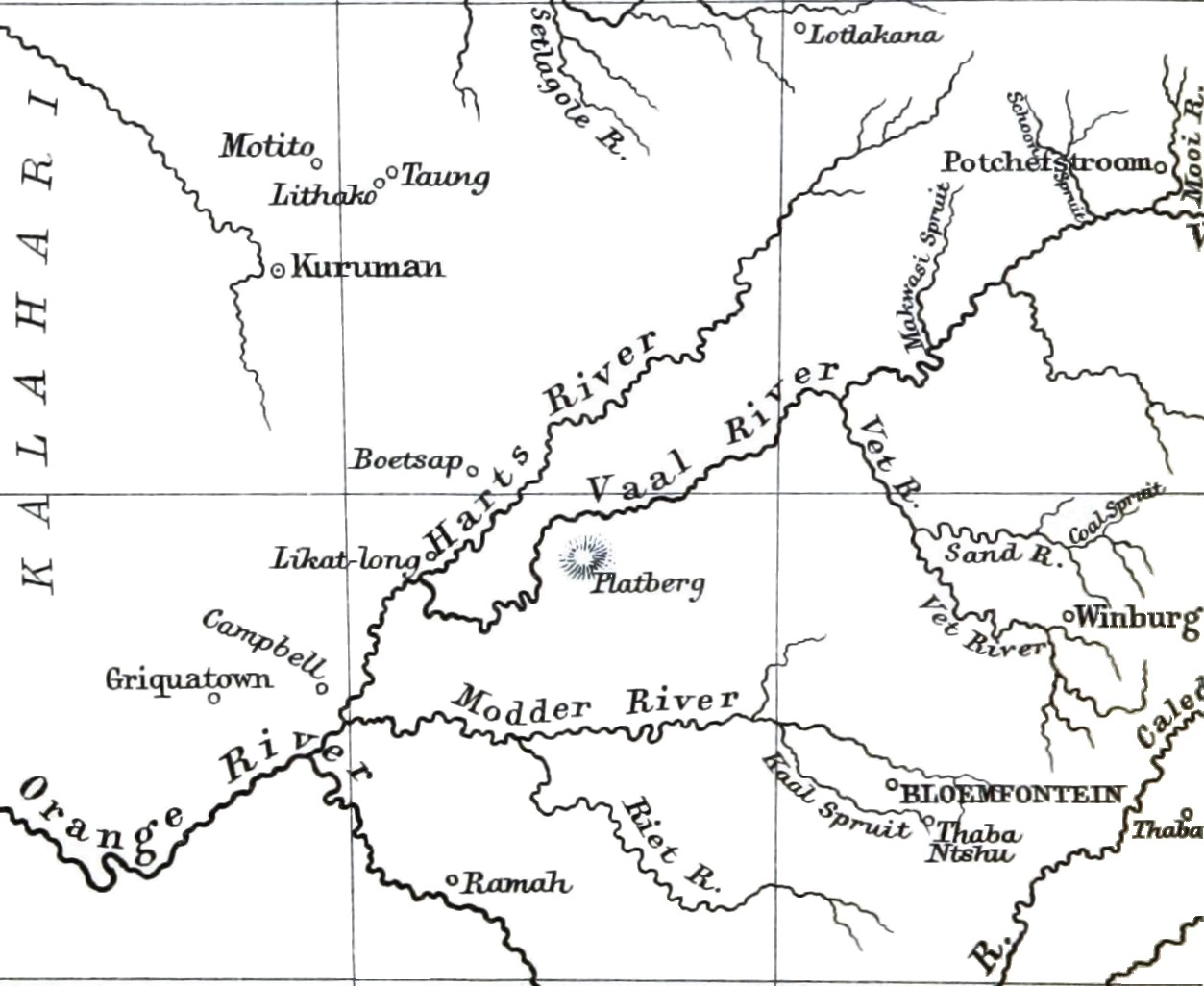
- Harts River on a map of 1887

- Location of the Harts River mouth
- Etymology: Translated into Afrikaans from its Khoekhoe name ǂGaoblgarib, meaning 'heart river'; possibly named after a chief or a tribal group
- Native name: ǂGaoblgarib (Khoekhoe)

Location
- Country: South Africa
- Region: North West Province, Northern Cape

Physical characteristics
- Source: Witwatersrand
  - location: Near Lichtenburg
  - elevation: 1,520 m (4,990 ft)
- Mouth: Vaal River
  - location: Delportshoop
  - coordinates: 28°24′4″S 24°16′38″E
  - elevation: 1,017 m (3,337 ft)
- Length: 320 km (200 mi)

The Harts River (Afrikaans: Hartsrivier) is a northern tributary of the Vaal River, which in turn is the largest tributary of the Orange River (also known as the Gariep River, the largest river in South Africa). Its source is in the North West Province, but the greater part of its basin is located in the Northern Cape Province, which it enters a few kilometers downstream from the Taung Dam.

The Harts forms a natural boundary for the Ghaap Plateau, located between the Harts River and the Kuruman Hills.

== Course ==
It rises near Lichtenburg on the far southwestern slopes of the Witwatersrand and flows for 320 km (about 200 miles) in a southwesterly direction, mostly through very flat areas of the North West and Northern Cape Provinces before flowing into the Vaal River about 100 km above the confluence of that river with the Orange River.

The Little Harts River which rises near Coligny joins the Great Harts River, which rises near Lichtenburg, to form the main river. Near Taung, the Dry Harts River, a seasonal river with its headwaters in the Vryburg area, also joins it. The river is characterised by highly intermittent runoff, but is regulated to optimise water usage. At Taung the Tswana referred to the Harts River as the Noka (meaning River) Kolong.

Further downstream, the town of Schweizer-Reneke (founded in October 1888) lies on the banks of the river. Wenzel Dam, just north of the town on the river, has been developed into a holiday resort.

Around 1850, a dam was built in the river next to Dikgatlong, but it was washed away during a flood in 1856.

Near the confluence of the Harts and Vaal Rivers at Delportshoop a major irrigation system, the Vaal-Harts Scheme was set up in 1933 as part of the national reconstruction effort after the Depression. Here water drawn from both the Vaal and the Harts rivers provide water to intensively irrigate numerous smallholdings through a system of canals in an otherwise dry area of the country, supporting towns such as Jan Kempdorp and Hartswater.

Around the northern part of the Scheme lie the settlements of Pampierstad, Motsweding, Mokgareng, Manthestad and Taung, all with mostly Tswana speaking residents. Taung became famous after the discovery of the skull of the so-called Taung Child in a lime quarry 14 km west of the town. The quarry is not in use anymore and is now the Taung Heritage Site and open to the public. To the west of the town, the Taung Dam was built in the Harts River. Upstream of the dam some rock engravings can be seen.

== History ==
On 31 March 1902, during the final months of the Second Boer War, the Battle of Harts River, also known as "Battle of Boschbult", was fought between the Boers and the British forces near the confluence of the Harts River and the Brak Spruit, one of its dry tributaries. The battle was a British defeat and was also the second bloodiest day of that war for the Canadian forces, who fought on the British side.

== Mining ==
Alluvial diamond mining still occurs in ancient river beds within the Harts River catchment area. The Newlands Mine is located some 60 km northwest of Kimberley on the river. It is currently being mined at a rate of 3000 tonnes per month by the company Dwyka Diamonds Limited. Noble Minerals, in cooperation with the local Ba-Ga-Maidi tribe has set up an operation to exploit the alluvial diamonds within 20 square kilometres of diamantiferous gravels of the river system, near Taung.

== Protected areas ==
Most of the fish found in the Harts River are introduced species, except in the area of Barberspan, where indigenous species can be found. It was declared a nature reserve in 1949.

Near the towns of Sannieshof and Delareyville, the river is connected to Barberspan (26°35' S 25°35' E)26°35′S 25°35′E, which lies partially inside the Barberspan Nature Reserve and is a Ramsar wetland site. The pan is 11 km long and 3.5 km wide, and it is named either after Frederick Hugh Barber FRGS, who hunted along the Harts River in 1875, or after the barbel (baber in the Afrikaans language), a species of catfish found in South African rivers.

In 1913, Jan Christiaan Smuts, who owned a farm near the southern end of the pan, provided the labour and his foreman, Mr M. S. Basson, supervised the digging of a channel which diverted water from the Harts River into the pan, which lies about 9 m lower than the river. The area is so flat that the Harts River now pushes enough water into Barberspan during the rainy season to last through the dry winter months, where previously the pan used to dry up during the dry season. This was ecologically important, since the pan now became a large perennial water body in an area of otherwise seasonal pans and vleis. It became an oasis for birds (especially water fowl) which use it for feeding, drinking, roosting, moulting and breeding. Up to 20,000 birds of more than 320 species can be seen at the Barberspan Bird Sanctuary, making it a popular birding spot, probably the finest in South Africa. Seven endangered bird species and two endangered mammal species occur here. Barberspan also supports a rich plankton community. (Ramsar, 1994).

Barberspan is also the venue for off-road vehicle rallies, like the Barberspan 500. There is a hotel, self-catering accommodation and camping facilities on the site.

== See also ==
- Department of Water Affairs (South Africa)
- List of rivers of South Africa
