= Phokwane Local Municipality =

Phokwane
- Local municipality
- Seal

- Location in the Northern Cape
- Coordinates: 27°50′S 24°50′E
- Country: South Africa
- Province: Northern Cape
- District: Frances Baard
- Seat: Hartswater
- Wards: 10

Government
  - Type: Municipal council
  - Mayor: Vuyisile Khen

Area
  - Total: 834 km^{2} (322 sq mi)

Population (2022)
  - Total: 80,481
  - Density: 96.5/km^{2} (250/sq mi)

Racial makeup (2011)
  - Black African: 81.9%
  - Coloured: 8.6%
  - Indian/Asian: 0.5%
  - White: 8.9%

First languages (2011)
  - Tswana: 66.6%
  - Afrikaans: 18.9%
  - Xhosa: 5.6%
  - English: 3.9%
  - Other: 5%
- Time zone: UTC+2 (SAST)
- Municipal code: NC094

Phokwane Municipality (Tswana: Mmasepala wa Phokwane; Afrikaans: Phokwane Munisipaliteit) is a local municipality within the Frances Baard District Municipality, in the Northern Cape province of South Africa. The name means "small Billy goat" in Setswana.

== Main places ==
The 2011 census divided the municipality into the following main places:

Place	Code	Area (km^{2})	Population
Banksdrif	386001	1.1	505
Ganspan	386006	1.2	2,301
Hartswater	386003	10.8	10,465
Jan Kempdorp	386005	19.1	24,220
Pampierstad	386004	10.4	21,707
Remainder	386002	791.3	3,802
Total		833.9	63,000

== Politics ==
The municipal council consists of nineteen members elected by mixed-member proportional representation. Ten councillors are elected by first-past-the-post voting in ten wards, while the remaining nine are chosen from party lists so that the total number of party representatives is proportional to the number of votes received. In the election of 1 November 2021 the African National Congress (ANC) won a majority of ten seats on the council. The following table shows the results of the election.

Phokwane local election, 1 November 2021
Party	Votes				Seats		
Party	Ward	List	Total	%	Ward	List	Total
African National Congress	7,509	7,486	14,995	47.2%	10	0	10
Economic Freedom Fighters	3,679	3,746	7,425	23.4%	0	4	4
Democratic Alliance	1,833	1,858	3,691	11.6%	0	2	2
Freedom Front Plus	931	901	1,832	5.8%	0	1	1
Phokwane Service Delivery Forum	498	571	1,069	3.4%	0	1	1
Forum for Service Delivery	338	404	742	2.3%	0	1	1
Patriotic Front of Azania	294	408	702	2.2%	0	0	0
Patriotic Alliance	167	216	383	1.2%	0	0	0
Independent candidates	372	–	372	1.2%	0	–	0
Azanian People's Organisation	144	148	292	0.9%	0	0	0
African People First	111	–	111	0.3%	0	–	0
African Christian Democratic Party	48	56	104	0.3%	0	0	0
United Christian Democratic Party	34	35	69	0.2%	0	0	0
Total	15,958	15,829	31,787		10	9	19
Valid votes	15,958	15,829	31,787	97.3%			
Spoilt votes	455	442	897	2.7%			
Total votes cast	16,413	16,271	32,684				
Voter turnout	16,440						
Registered voters	32,409						
Turnout percentage	50.7%						
