= Magareng Local Municipality =

Magareng
- Local municipality
- Seal

- Location in the Northern Cape
- Coordinates: 28°10′S 24°50′E
- Country: South Africa
- Province: Northern Cape
- District: Frances Baard
- Seat: Warrenton
- Wards: 6

Government
  - Type: Municipal council
  - Mayor: Neo Mase

Area
  - Total: 1,542 km^{2} (595 sq mi)

Population (2022)
  - Total: 26,816
  - Density: 17.39/km^{2} (45.04/sq mi)

Racial makeup (2022)
  - Black African: 74.3%
  - Coloured: 14.2%
  - Indian/Asian: 1.1%
  - White: 10.4%

First languages (2011)
  - Tswana: 67.2%
  - Afrikaans: 21.2%
  - Xhosa: 3.6%
  - Sotho: 2.2%
  - Other: 5.8%
- Time zone: UTC+2 (SAST)
- Municipal code: NC093

Magareng Municipality (Tswana: Mmasepala wa Magareng; Afrikaans: Magareng Munisipaliteit) is a local municipality within the Frances Baard District Municipality, in the Northern Cape province of South Africa.

Magareng is a Setswana name meaning "in the middle". The name reflects the geographic location of the municipality in relation to other areas.

== Main places ==
The 2011 census divided the municipality into the following main places:

Place	Code	Area (km^{2})	Population
Ikutseng	385001	4.9	16,683
Warrenton	385002	26.8	5,905
Remainder of the municipality	385003	1,510.0	1,616
Total		1,541.7	24,204

== Politics ==
The municipal council consists of eleven members elected by mixed-member proportional representation. Six councillors are elected by first-past-the-post voting in six wards, while the remaining five are chosen from party lists so that the total number of party representatives is proportional to the number of votes received. In the election of 1 November 2021 the African National Congress (ANC) won a majority of six seats on the council. The following table shows the results of the election.

Magareng local election, 1 November 2021
Party	Votes				Seats		
Party	Ward	List	Total	%	Ward	List	Total
African National Congress	2,989	3,146	6,135	50.3%	5	1	6
Economic Freedom Fighters	1,064	1,400	2,464	20.2%	0	2	2
Democratic Alliance	756	859	1,615	13.3%	1	1	2
Patriotic Alliance	378	477	855	7.0%	0	1	1
Independent candidates	716	–	716	5.9%	0	–	0
Freedom Front Plus	159	160	319	2.6%	0	0	0
African Christian Democratic Party	36	46	82	0.7%	0	0	0
Total	6,098	6,088	12,186		6	5	11
Valid votes	6,098	6,088	12,186	98.2%			
Spoilt votes	106	122	228	1.8%			
Total votes cast	6,204	6,210	12,414				
Voter turnout	6,213						
Registered voters	11,644						
Turnout percentage	53.4%						
