= Vaalharts Irrigation Scheme =

South African irrigation layout

Coordinates: 28°01′S 24°43′E

The Vaalharts Irrigation Scheme is one of the largest irrigation schemes in the world covering 369.50 square kilometres in the Northern Cape Province of South Africa. It is named after the Vaal River and the Harts River; it being a major tributary of the Vaal River.

Water from a diversion weir in the Vaal River, near Warrenton, flows through a 1,176 km long network of canals. This system provides irrigation water to a total of 39 820ha scheduled land, industrial water to six towns and other industrial water users.

Each plot feeds off of the canals running past their "front" access from their respective streets into their own reservoirs with their own hatch from the canal. The water then goes through pumps to be sprinkled across the farmland. The most popular method to do this is with pivots. Historically, there were no dams or pumps to speak of. They made use of a process called "leiwater" and simply let the water flow directly from the canals into channels dug into the ground to irrigate it.

== Plot numbering ==
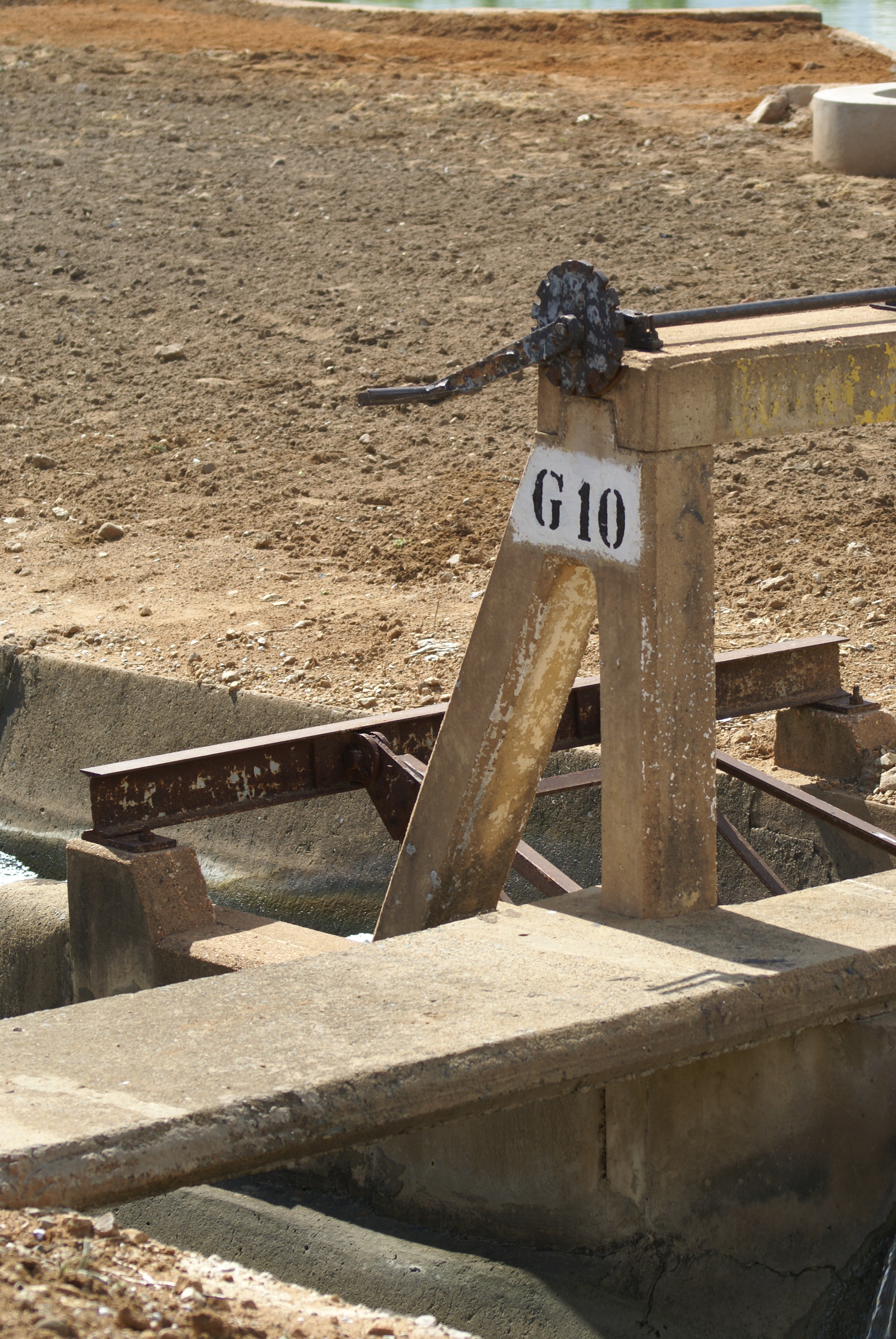
Canal sluice gate marked “G 10”

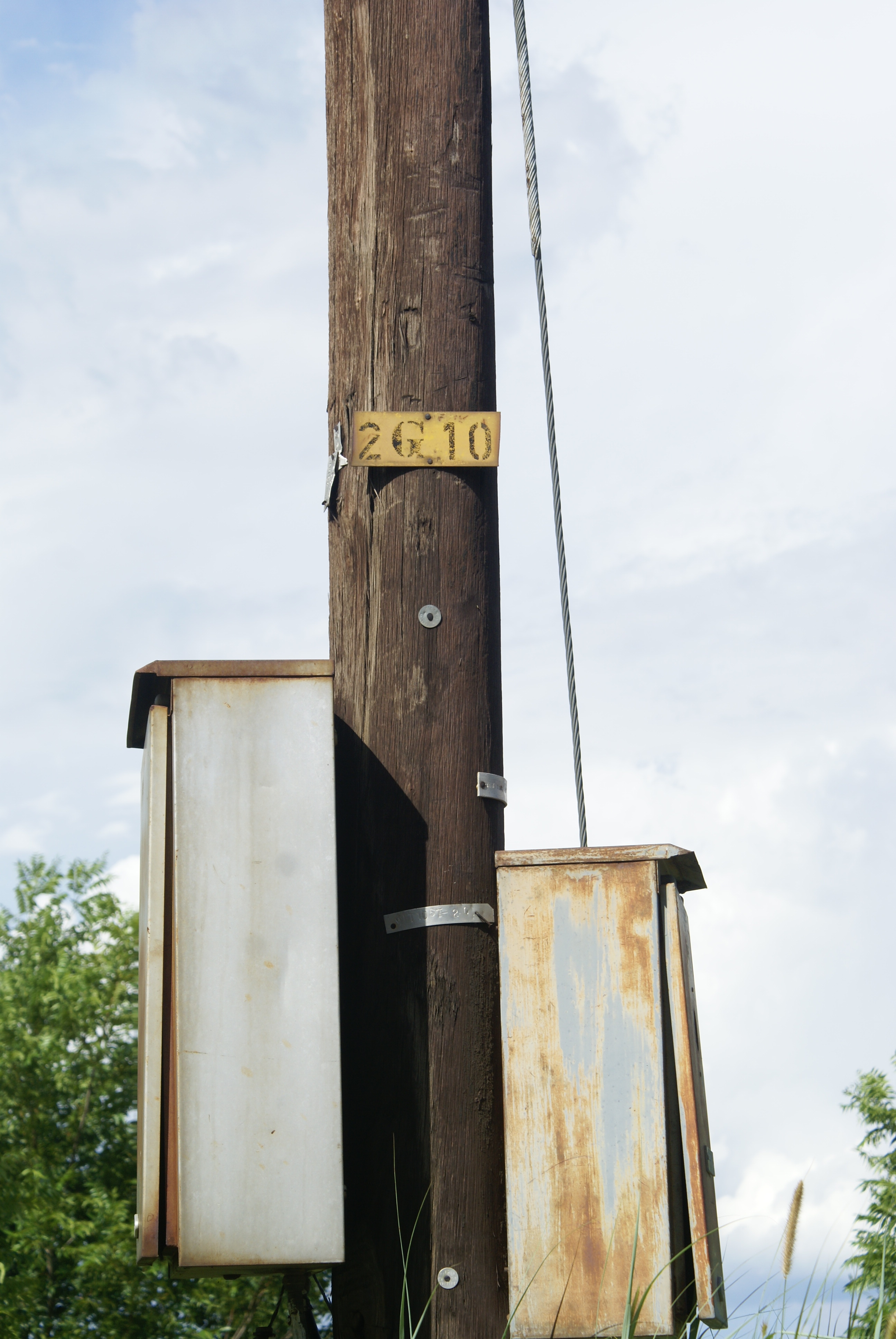
An identification plate marked “2 G 10”

The farmland is divided into individual blocks which each have an identifying letter, or letter group counting up from A from the south, starting at Jan-Kempdorp to M at the north near Magogong. The canals divide into all of the blocks and the streets.

There are usually 6 or more plots on each street. Each plot has a number counting up from one from the south side toward the north. The streets have are enumerated similarly from east to west. To reference a specific plot, the format would be [Plot number] [Block letter] [Street number]. e.g. 7 F 16. This then means "The 7th plot on the 16th street of the F block, or street F 16".

== See also ==
- Hartswater
- Windsorton
