= Warrenton, South Africa =

Warrenton
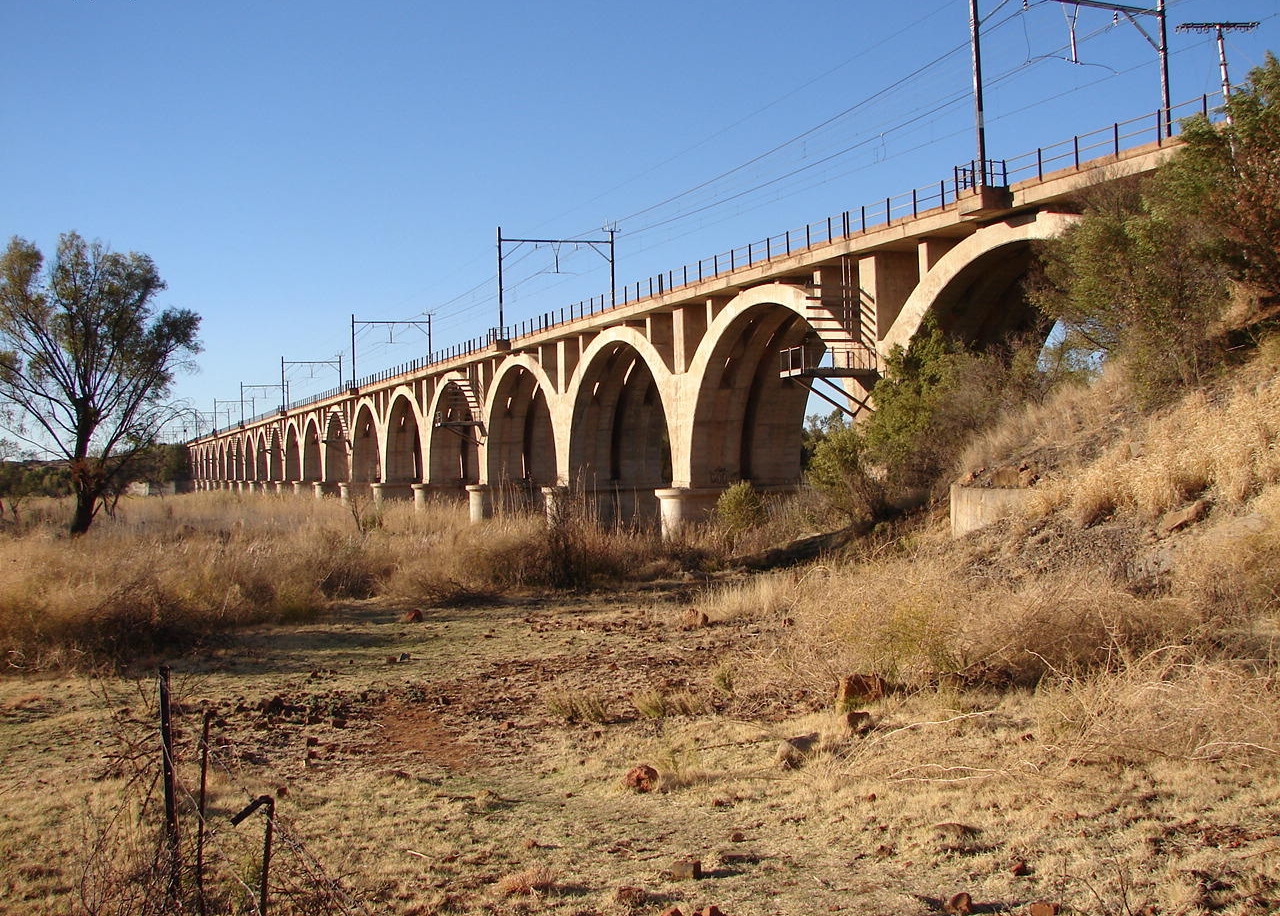
- Railway bridge across the Vaal River at Warrenton

- Location within Northern Cape Location within South Africa
- Coordinates: 28°06′41″S 24°50′59″E
- Country: South Africa
- Province: Northern Cape
- District: Frances Baard
- Municipality: Magareng
- Established: 1880

Area
  - Total: 31.7 km^{2} (12.2 sq mi)
- Elevation: 1,180 m (3,870 ft)

Population (2011)
  - Total: 22,588
  - Density: 713/km^{2} (1,850/sq mi)

Racial makeup (2011)
  - Black African: 79.6%
  - Coloured: 14.2%
  - Indian/Asian: 0.7%
  - White: 5.1%
  - Other: 0.3%

First languages (2011)
  - Tswana: 66.7%
  - Afrikaans: 21.7%
  - Xhosa: 3.8%
  - Sotho: 2.0%
  - Other: 5.8%
- Time zone: UTC+2 (SAST)
- Postal code (street): 8530
- PO box: 8530
- Area code: 053

Warrenton is an agricultural town of approximately 22,588 people in the Northern Cape province of South Africa, situated 70 kilometres (40 mi) north of Kimberley on the Vaal River.

== History ==
In 1880, a syndicate bought the western portion of the farm Grasbult to irrigate the fertile land and produce vegetables for the diamond fields. The town which grew here was named after Sir Charles Warren. Diamonds were discovered here in 1888 and mining continued to 1926.

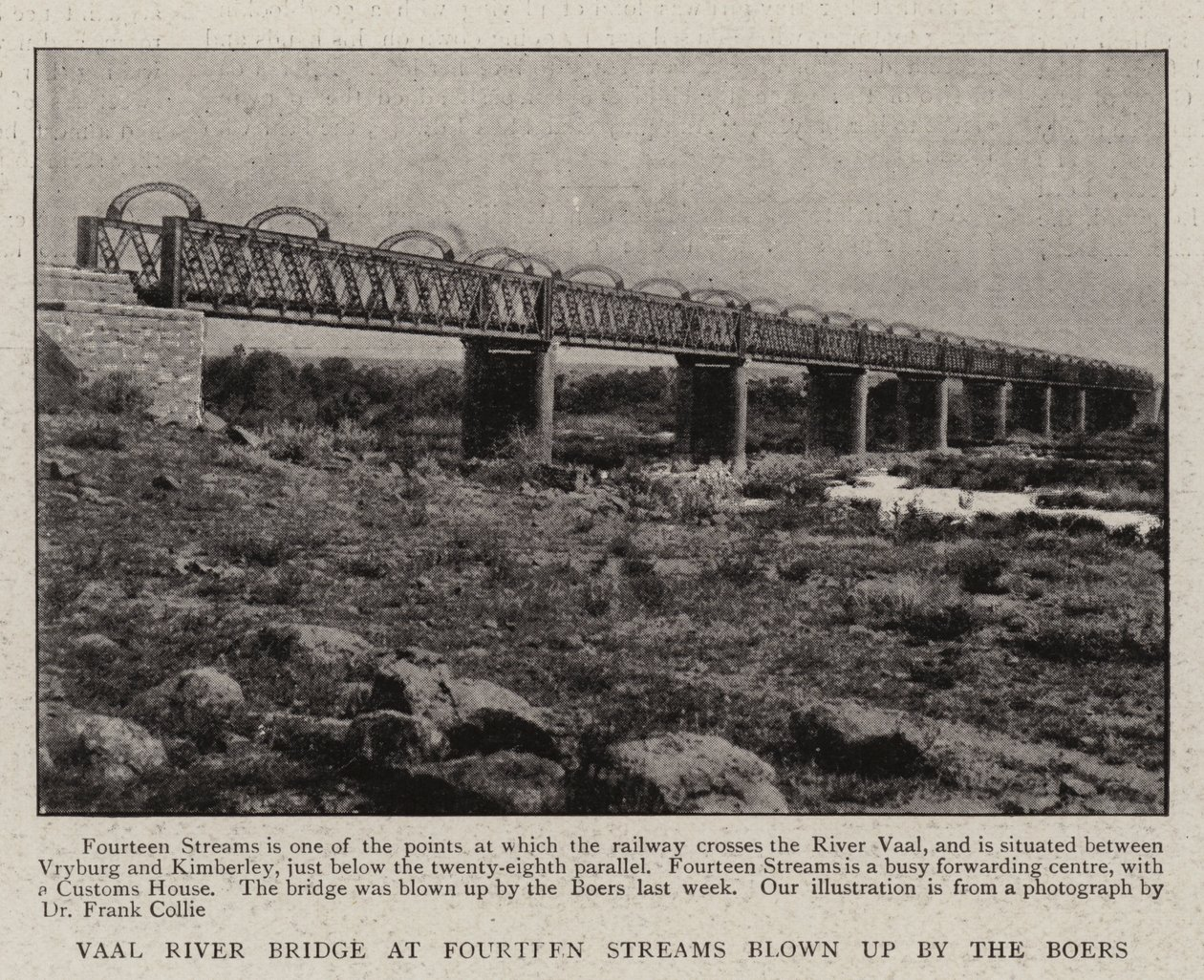
Newspaper cutting "Vaal River Bridge at Fourteen Streams blown up by the Boers", 1899.

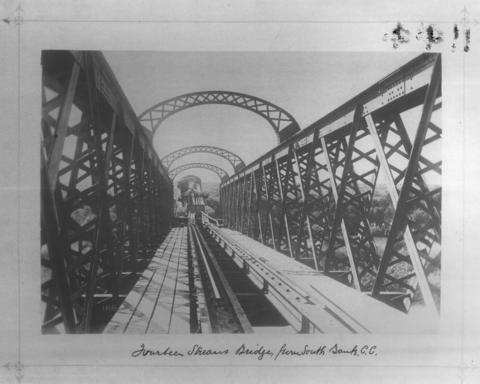
Damaged railway bridge in the Second Boer War at Veertien Strome (Fourteen Streams) near Warrenton, around 1900.

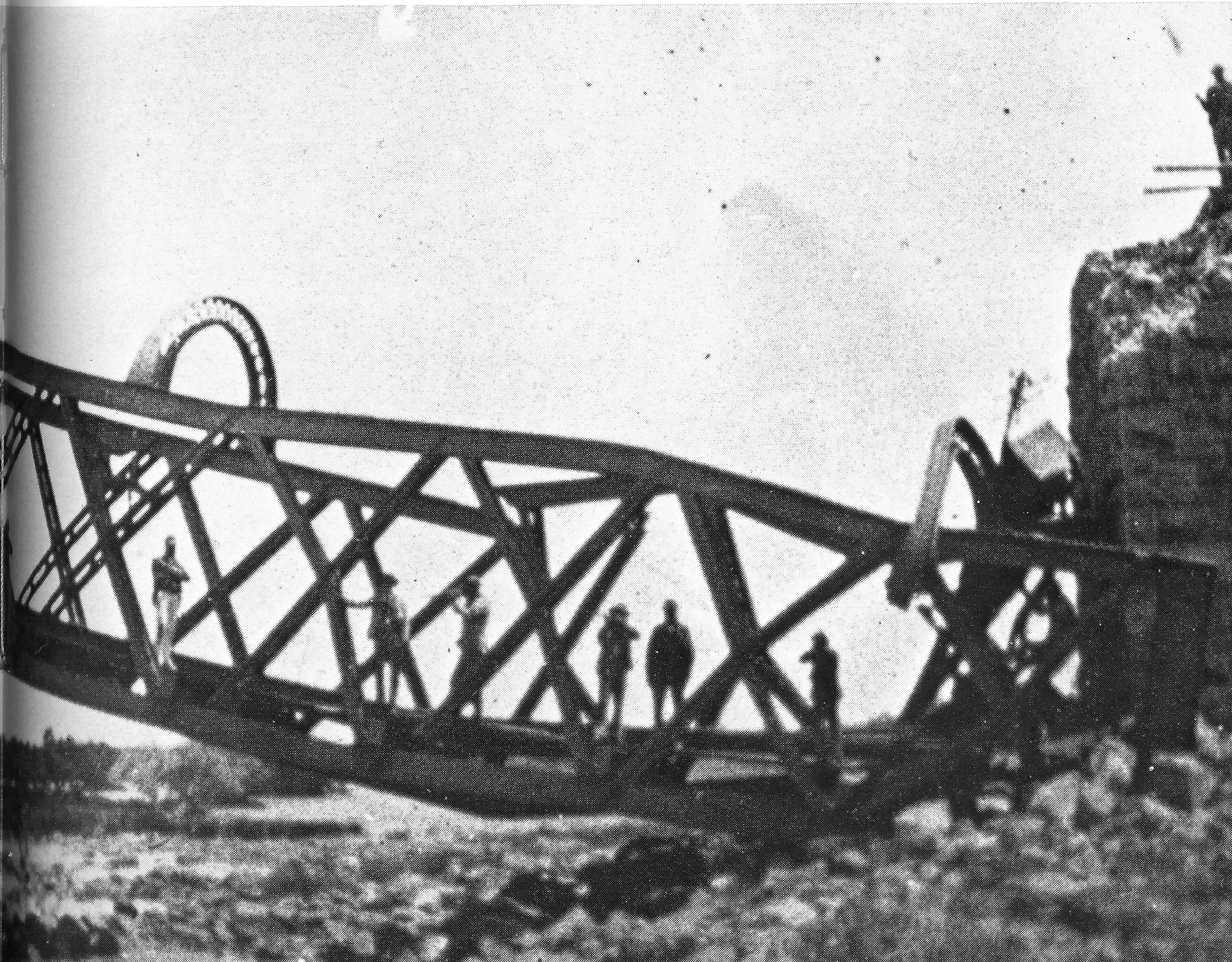
Railway bridge at Veertien Strome, destroyed by the Boer military, Boer War 1899-1902.

== Geography ==
Warrenton is situated in the north-eastern part of the Northern Cape province, on the south bank of the Vaal River, approximately 70 kilometres (40 mi) north of Kimberley, the provincial capital.

The town lies just downstream of the Vaalharts Dam, which supplies water to the Vaalharts Irrigation Scheme.

The N12 national route, the main route from Kimberley to Gauteng, passes through Warrenton, and the N18 national route to Mahikeng and Botswana stars there.

The main Cape Town–Kimberley–Johannesburg railway line also passes through the town, and the line to Mahikeng and Botswana branches off at Fourteen Streams, on the north bank of the Vaal opposite Warrenton.

== Demographics ==
In the 2011 Census the population of Warrenton, including the township of Ikhutseng, was recorded as 22,588 people living in 5,615 households. 80% of the residents described themselves as "Black African", 14% as "Coloured", 5% as "White", and 1% as "Indian or Asian". 67% of the residents of the town speak Setswana as their first language, while 22% speak Afrikaans, 4% speak Xhosa and 2% speak Sotho.

== Government ==
Warrenton is the only town in the Magareng Local Municipality, which covers an area of 1,542 square kilometres (595 sq mi) between the Harts River and the Free State border. The municipal council is controlled by an African National Congress majority; the mayor is Neo Mase.
