= Frances Baard District Municipality =

Frances Baard Diamantveld
- District municipality
- Seal

- Location of Frances Baard District Municipality within Northern Cape
- Coordinates: 28°30′S 24°30′E
- Country: South Africa
- Province: Northern Cape
- Seat: Kimberley
- Local municipalities: List: Sol Plaatje; Dikgatlong; Magareng; Phokwane

Government
  - Type: Municipal council
  - Executive Mayor: Unondumisa Buda
  - Speaker: Keamogetse Mothibi
  - Municipal Manager: Mamikie Bogatsu

Area
  - Total: 13,518.19 km^{2} (5,219.40 sq mi)

Population (2022)
  - Total: 434 342
  - Density: 0.0321/km^{2} (0.0832/sq mi)

Racial makeup (2022)
  - Black African: 67.1%
  - Coloured: 23.4%
  - Indian/Asian: 1.0%
  - White: 8.3%

First languages (2011)
  - Tswana: 43.3%
  - Afrikaans: 38.6%
  - English: 6.2%
  - Xhosa: 4.9%
  - Other: 7%
- Time zone: UTC+2 (SAST)
- Municipal code: DC9
- Website: https://francesbaard.gov.za/

The Frances Baard District Municipality (Tswana: Mmasepala wa Sedika wa Frances Baard; Afrikaans: Frances Baard-distriksmunisipaliteit), previously the Diamantveld District Municipality, is one of the 5 districts of the Northern Cape province of South Africa. The seat of the municipality is Kimberley. As of 2022, the majority of its 434,342 residents speak Setswana. The district code is DC9.

Previously known as the Diamantveld District Municipality, it was renamed in honour of Frances Baard in June 2001. On 9 August 2009, a statue of Frances Baard was unveiled by Northern Cape Premier Hazel Jenkins.

== Geography ==
=== Neighbours ===
Frances Baard is surrounded by:

- Dr Ruth Segomotsi Mompati (DC39) in the north
- John Taolo Gaetsewe (DC45) in the north west
- Lejweleputswa (DC18) in the east
- Pixley ka Seme (DC7) in the south
- Xhariep (DC16) in the south-west
- ZF Mgcawu (DC8) in the west

=== Local municipalities ===
The district contains the following local municipalities:

Local municipality	Population (2022)	%
Sol Plaatje	270 078	62.18%
Phokwane	80 481	18.53%
Dikgatlong	56 967	13.12%
Magareng	26 816	6.17%

== Demographics ==
The following statistics are from the 2022 census.

=== Gender ===
Gender	Population	%
Female	226 239	52.09%
Male	208 104	47.91%

=== Ethnic group ===
Ethnic group	Population	%
Black African	291 162	67.1%
Coloured	101 815	23.4%
White	36 116	8.3%
Indian/Asian	4 510	1.0%
Other	604	0.1%

=== Age ===
Age	Population	%
0 - 4	41 323	9.51%
5 - 14	78 255	18.02%
15 - 34	145 174	33.42%
35 - 59	125 225	28.83%
60+	44 315	10.2%

== Politics ==
=== Election results ===
Election results for Frances Baard in the South African general election, 2004.

- Population 18 and over: 206 209 [63.49% of total population]
- Total votes: 129 954 [40.01% of total population]
- Voting % estimate: 63.02% votes as a % of population 18 and over

Party	Votes	%
African National Congress	98 219	75.58%
Democratic Alliance	14 164	10.90%
Independent Democrats	5 086	3.91%
New National Party	4 098	3.15%
African Christian Democratic Party	2 211	1.70%
Azanian People's Organisation	1 498	1.15%
Freedom Front Plus	1 259	0.97%
United Christian Democratic Party	1 077	0.83%
Pan African Congress	842	0.65%
Inkhata Freedom Party	394	0.30%
United Democratic Movement	347	0.27%
NA	109	0.08%
EMSA	100	0.08%
PJC	89	0.07%
SOPA	89	0.07%
CDP	80	0.06%
NLP	76	0.06%
UF	67	0.05%
KISS	57	0.04%
TOP	57	0.04%
Minority Front	35	0.03%
Total	129 954	100.00%
