= Northern Cape =

Coordinates: 30°S 22°E

Northern Cape: Noord-Kaap (Afrikaans); Kapa Bokone (Tswana); eMntla-Kapa (Xhosa); Nama!hub (Khoekhoe)
- Province
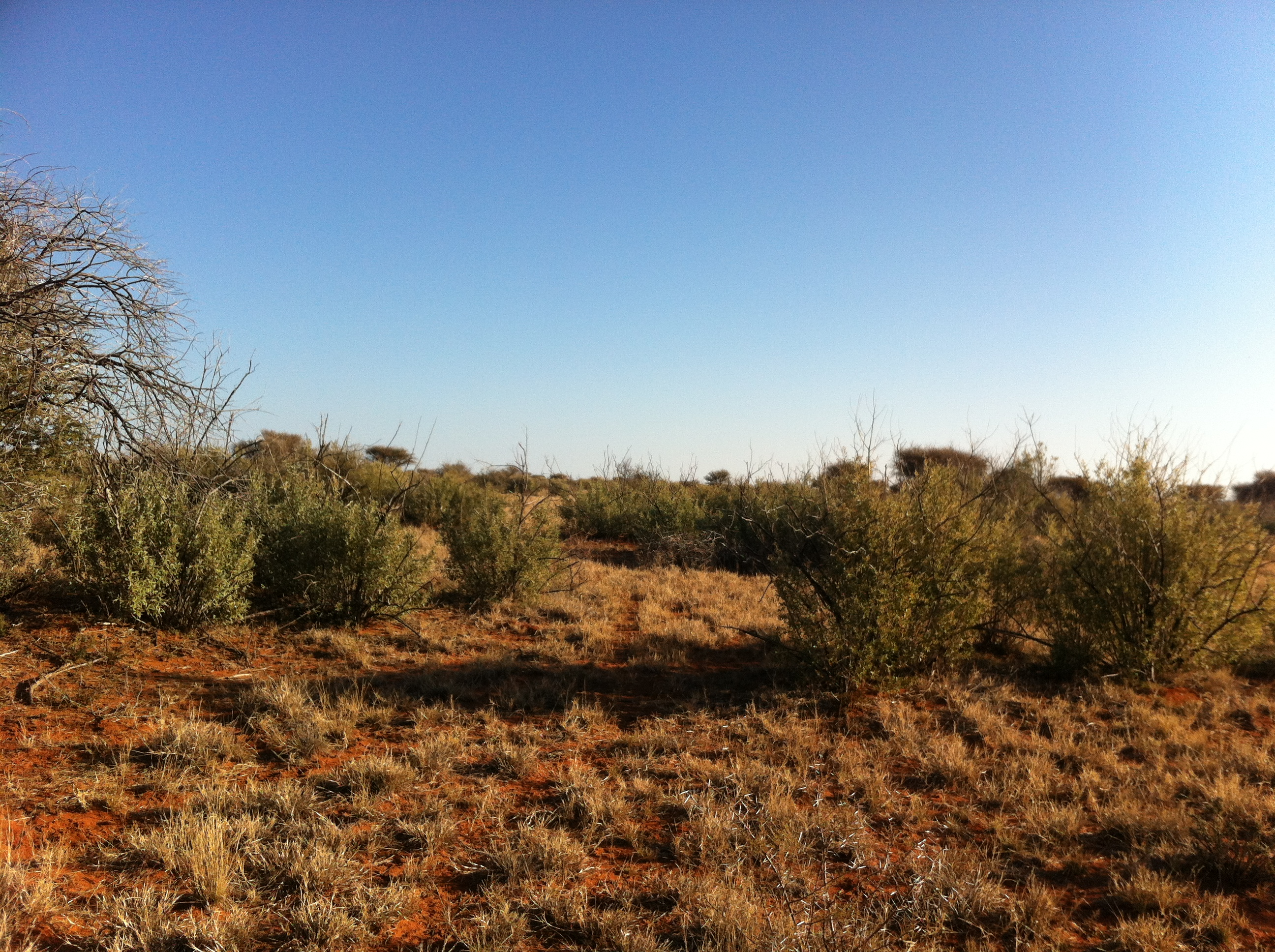
- Diamondfields

- Coat of arms
- Motto: Sa ǁa ǃaĩsi 'uĩsi (Strive for a better life)
- Location of the Northern Cape in South Africa
- Country: South Africa
- Established: 27 April 1994
- Capital and largest city: Kimberley
- Districts: List: Namakwa; Pixley ka Seme; ZF Mgcawu; Frances Baard; John Taolo Gaetsewe

Government
  - Type: Parliamentary system
  - Premier: Zamani Saul (ANC)
  - Legislature: Northern Cape Provincial Legislature

Area
  - Total: 372,889 km^{2} (143,973 sq mi)
  - Rank: 1st in South Africa
- Highest elevation: 2,156 m (7,073 ft)
- Lowest elevation: 0 m (0 ft)

Population (2022)
  - Total: 1,355,629
  - Rank: 9th in South Africa
  - Density: 3.63548/km^{2} (9.41584/sq mi)
  - Rank: 9th in South Africa

Population groups (2022)
  - Black: 50.1%
  - Coloured: 41.6%
  - White: 7.3%
  - Indian or Asian: 0.8%

Languages (2022)
  - Afrikaans: 54.6%
  - Tswana: 35.7%
  - Xhosa: 4.5%
  - English: 2.4%
- Time zone: UTC+2 (SAST)
- ISO 3166 code: ZA-NC
- HDI (2021): 0.701 high · 6th of 9
- GDP: US$9.1 billion
- Website: www.northern-cape.gov.za

Northern Cape
- Zulu: iNyakatho Kapa
- Xhosa: eMntla-Kapa
- Afrikaans: Noord-Kaap
- Sepedi: Kapa Leboa
- Swazi: eNyakatfo-Kapa
- Sesotho: Kapa Leboya
- Setswana: Kapa Bokone
- Xitsonga: Kapa N'walungu
- Venda: Kapa Devhula
- Southern Ndebele: eTlhagwini Kapa
- Khoekhoe: Nama!hub

The Northern Cape (Afrikaans: Noord-Kaap [ˈnuərtkɑːp]; Tswana: Kapa Bokone; Xhosa: eMntla-Kapa; Khoekhoe: Nama!hub) is one of the 9 provinces in South Africa.

The Northern Cape is the largest province accounting for 30.5% of the country's overall land area while being the most sparsely populated province in South Africa. It was created in 1994 when the Cape Province was split up. Its capital is Kimberley. It includes the Kalahari Gemsbok National Park, part of the Kgalagadi Transfrontier Park and an international park shared with Botswana. It also includes the Augrabies Falls and the diamond mining regions in Kimberley and Alexander Bay.

The Namaqualand region in the west is famous for its Namaqualand daisies. The southern towns of De Aar and Colesberg found within the Great Karoo are major transport nodes between Johannesburg, Cape Town and Gqeberha. Kuruman can be found in the north-east and is known as a mission station. It is also well known for its artesian spring and Eye of Kuruman. The Orange River flows through the province, forming the borders with the Free State in the southeast and with Namibia to the northwest. The river is also used to irrigate the many vineyards in the arid region near Upington.

Native speakers of Afrikaans comprise a higher percentage of the population in the Northern Cape than in any other province. The Northern Cape's four official languages are Afrikaans, Tswana, Xhosa, and English. Minorities speak the other official languages of South Africa and a few people speak indigenous languages such as Nama and Khwe.

The provincial motto, Sa ǁa ǃaĩsi 'uĩsi ("We go to a better life"), is in the Nǀu language of the Nǁnǂe (ǂKhomani) people. It was given in 1997 by one of the language's last speakers, Ms. Elsie Vaalbooi of Rietfontein, who has since died. It was South Africa's first officially registered motto in a Khoisan language. Subsequently, South Africa's national motto, ǃKe e ǀxarra ǁke, was derived from the extinct ǀXam language.

== History ==
The Northern Cape was one of three provinces made out of the Cape Province in 1994, the others being Western Cape to the south and Eastern Cape to the southeast. Politically, it had been dominated since 1994 by the African National Congress (ANC). Ethnic issues are important in the politics of the Northern Cape. For example, it is the site of the Orania settlement, whose leaders have called for a Volkstaat for the Afrikaner people in the province.

The Northern Cape is also the home of over 1,000 San who emigrated from Namibia following the independence of the country; they had served as trackers and scouts for the South African Defence Force during the South African Border War, and feared reprisals from their former foes. They were awarded a settlement in Platfontein in 1999 by the Mandela government.

The precolonial history of the Northern Cape is reflected in a rich, mainly Stone Age, archaeological heritage. Cave sites include Wonderwerk Cave near Kuruman, which has a uniquely long sequence stretching from the turn of the twentieth century at the surface to more than 1 million (and possibly nearly 2 million) years in its basal layer (where stone tools, occurring in very low density, may be Oldowan). Many sites across the province, mostly in open air locales or in sediments alongside rivers or pans, document Earlier, Middle and Later Stone Age habitation. From Later Stone Age times, mainly, there is a wealth of rock art sites – most of which are in the form of rock engravings such as at Wildebeest Kuil and many sites in the area known as ǀXam -ka !kau, in the Karoo. They occur on hilltops, slopes, rock outcrops and occasionally (as in the case of Driekops Eiland near Kimberley), in a river bed. In the north eastern part of the province there are sites attributable to the Iron Age such as Dithakong. Environmental factors have meant that the spread of Iron Age farming westwards (from the 17th century – but dating from the early first millennium AD in the eastern part of South Africa) was constrained mainly to the area east of the Langeberg Mountains, but with evidence of influence as far as the Upington area in the eighteenth century. From that period the archaeological record also reflects the development of a complex colonial frontier when precolonial social formations were considerably disrupted and there is an increasing 'fabric heavy' imprint of built structures, ash-heaps, and so on. The copper mines of Namaqualand and the diamond rush to the Kimberley area resulted in industrial archaeological landscapes in those areas which herald the modern era in South African history.

== Geography ==
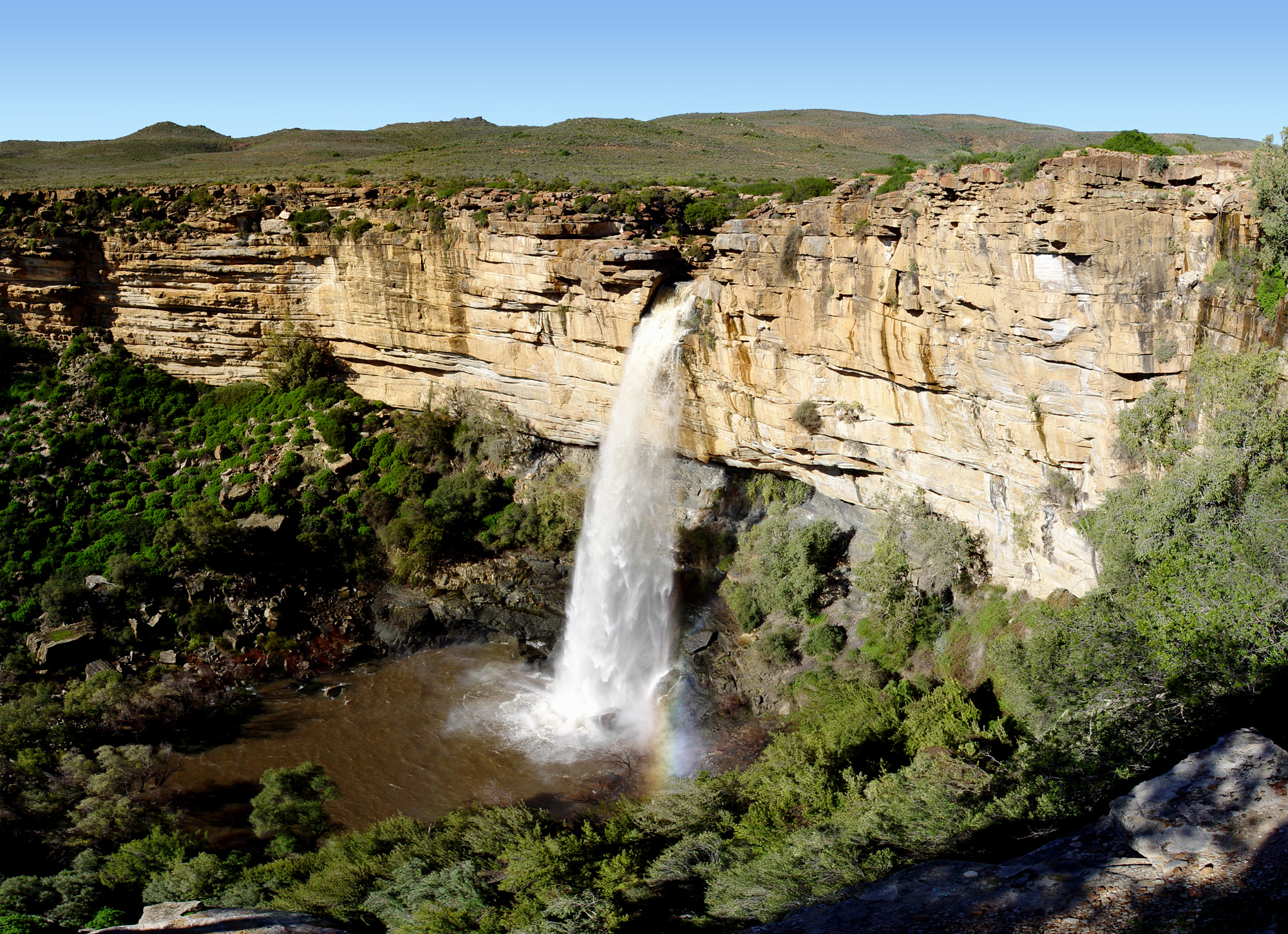
A waterfall situated a few kilometres north of Nieuwoudtville on the road to Loeriesfontein, in the Northern Cape (Namaqualand region).

The Northern Cape is South Africa's largest province, and distances between towns are enormous due to its sparse population. Its size is just shy of the size of the American state of Montana and slightly larger than that of Germany. The province is dominated by the Karoo Basin and consists mostly of sedimentary rocks and some dolerite intrusions. The south and south-east of the province is high-lying, 1,200–1,900 metres (3,900–6,200 ft), in the Roggeveld and Nuweveld districts. The west coast is dominated by the Namaqualand region, famous for its spring flowers. This area is hilly to mountainous and consists of granites and metamorphic rocks. The central areas are generally flat with interspersed salt pans. Kimberlite intrusions punctuate the Karoo rocks, giving the province its most precious natural resource, diamonds. The north is primarily Kalahari Desert, characterised by parallel red sand dunes and acacia tree dry savanna.

Northern Cape has a shoreline in the west on the South Atlantic Ocean. It borders the following areas of Namibia and Botswana:

- ǁKaras Region, Namibia – Northwest
- Hardap Region, Namibia – Far northwest
- Kgalagadi District, Botswana – North

Domestically, it borders the following provinces:

- North West – Northeast
- Free State – East
- Eastern Cape – Southeast
- Western Cape – South and southwest

=== Rivers ===
The major river system is the Orange (or Gariep) River Basin, draining the interior of South Africa westwards into the Atlantic Ocean. (The political philosopher Neville Alexander has used the idea of the 'Garieb' as a metaphor for nationhood in South Africa, a flowing together, in preference to the rainbow metaphor where the diverse colours remain distinct). The principal tributary of the Orange is the Vaal River, which flows through part of the Northern Cape from the vicinity of Warrenton. The Vaal, in turn, has tributaries within the province: the Harts River and the Riet River, which has its own major tributary, the Modder River.

Above the Orange-Vaal confluence, the Seekoei River drains part of the northeastern Karoo into the Orange River above the Vanderkloof Dam. Next downstream from the Orange-Vaal confluence is the Brak River, which flows nonperennially from the south and is in turn fed by the Ongers River, rising in the vicinities of Hanover and Richmond respectively. Along the Orange River near the town of Kakamas, the Hartebeest River drains the central Karoo. Above Kenhardt the Hartebeest is known as the Sak River, which has its source on the northern side of the escarpment, southeast of Williston. Further downstream from Kakamas, below the Augrabies Falls, and seldom actually flowing into the Orange River, is the Molopo River, which comes down from the Kalahari in the north. With its tributary, the Nossob River, it defines part of the international boundary between South Africa and Botswana. Further tributaries of the Molopo River include the Kuruman River, fed by the Moshaweng River and Kgokgole River, and the Matlhwaring River. Flowing west into the Atlantic, in Namaqualand, is the Buffels River and, further south, the Groen River.

=== Climate ===
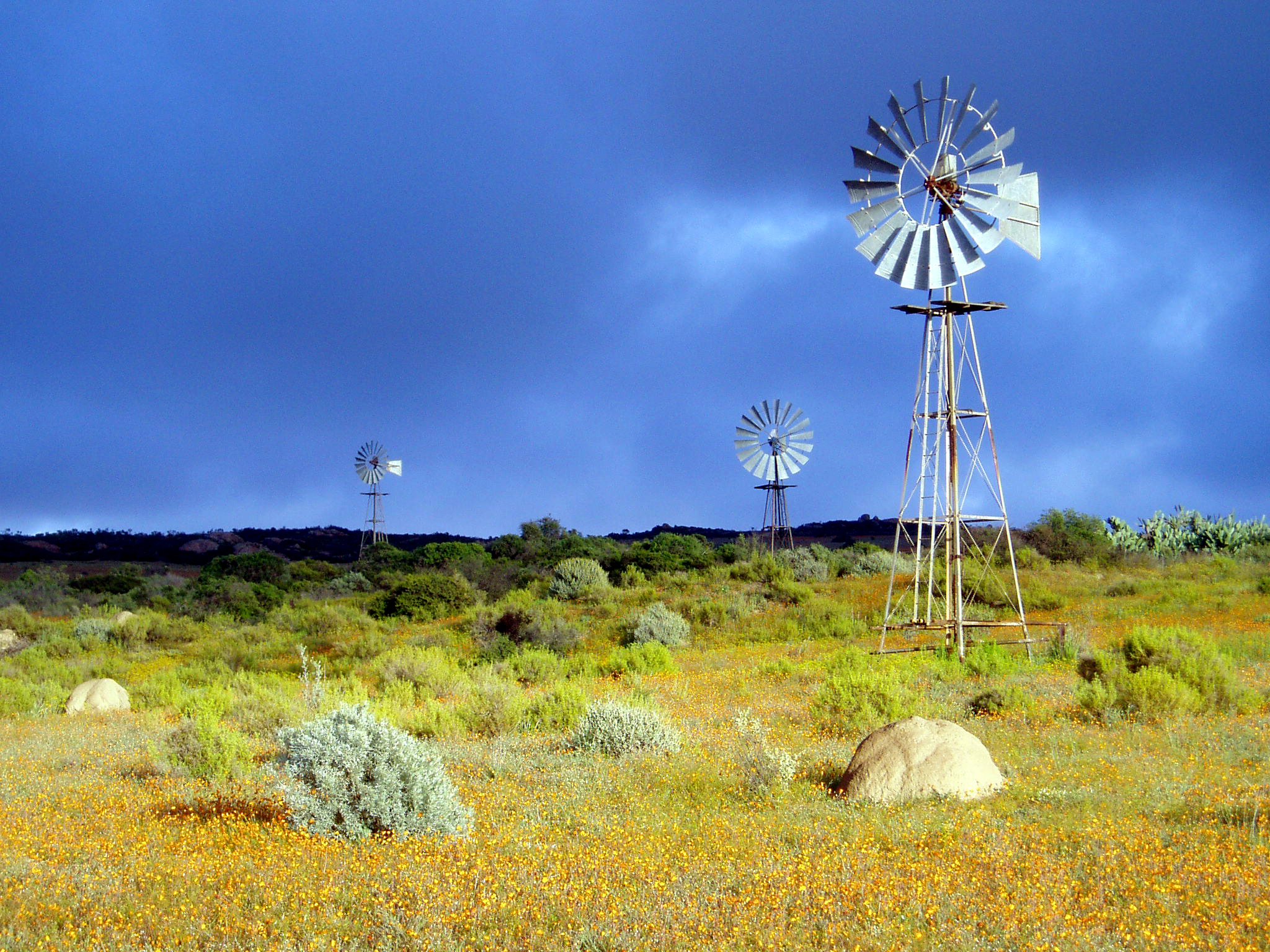
Windmills in Namaqualand, Northern Cape

Mostly arid to semiarid, few areas in the province receive more than 400 mm (16 in) of rainfall per annum and the average annual rainfall over the province is 202 mm (8.0 in). Rainfall generally increases from west to east from a minimum average of 20 mm (0.79 in) to a maximum of 540 mm (21 in) per year. The west experiences most rainfall in winter, while the east receives most of its moisture from late summer thunderstorms. Many areas experience extreme heat, with the hottest temperatures in South Africa measured along the Namibian border. Summers maximums are generally 30 °C (86 °F) or higher, sometimes higher than 40 °C (104 °F). Winters are usually frosty and clear, with southern areas sometimes becoming bitterly cold, such as Sutherland, which often receives snow and temperatures occasionally drop below the −10 °C (14 °F) mark.

- Kimberley averages: January maximum: 33 °C (91 °F) (min: 18 °C (64 °F)), June maximum: 18 °C (64 °F) (min: 3 °C (37 °F)), annual precipitation: 414 mm (16.3 in)
- Springbok averages: January maximum: 30 °C (86 °F) (min: 15 °C (59 °F)), July maximum: 17 °C (63 °F) (min: 7 °C (45 °F)), annual precipitation: 195 mm (7.7 in)
- Sutherland averages: January maximum: 27 °C (81 °F) (min: 9 °C (48 °F)), July maximum: 13 °C (55 °F) (min: −3 °C (27 °F)), annual precipitation: 237 mm (9.3 in)

=== National Parks ===
- MokalaNational Park
- Augrabies Falls National Park
- Tankwa Karoo National Park
- Namaqua National Park

== Demographics ==
Population density in the Northern Cape: <1 /km^{2}; 1–3 /km^{2}; 3–10 /km^{2}; 10–30 /km^{2}; 30–100 /km^{2}; 100–300 /km^{2}; 300–1000 /km^{2}; 1000–3000 /km^{2}; >3000 /km^{2}

Dominant home languages in the Northern Cape: Afrikaans; English; Xhosa; Tswana; No language dominant

As of the 2022 census, the Northern Cape had a population of 1,355,629, an increase of 18.3% from the prior census in 2011. It is least populous and by a considerable margin the least densely populated of South Africa's nine provinces. The median age is 27, an increase of 2 years from 2011.

=== Race/Ethnicity ===
In the 2022 census, 50.1% of the population described themselves as Black African, 41.6% as Coloured, 7.3% as White and 0.8% as Indian/Asian. Coloureds form a higher proportion of the population in the Northern Cape than in any other province except for the Western Cape.

Historic Breakdown of Population by Group
| Population Group | 1996 | 2001 | 2011 | 2022 |
|---|---|---|---|---|
| Black African | 44.9% | 46.5% | 50.4% | 50.1% |
| Coloured | 43.7% | 42.9% | 40.3% | 41.6% |
| White | 11.2% | 10.3% | 7.1% | 7.3% |
| Indian/Asian | 0.2% | 0.2% | 0.7% | 0.8% |
| Other | n/a | n/a | 1.6% | 0.2% |

=== Languages ===
In the 2022 census, 54.6% of the population reported their first language as Afrikaans, 35.7% as Setswana, 4.5% as Xhosa, and 2.4% as English. The Northern Cape is the only province in which native Afrikaans-speakers form a majority of the population. It is also the province with the second-highest proportion of Setswana speakers, after North West province.

=== Religion ===
The population of the Northern Cape is overwhelmingly Christian. As of the 2022 census, 97.8% of the population described themselves as Christians, the highest proportion among South Africa's provinces. Among other religions, 0.8% of the population described themselves as Muslim, and 0.7% of the population stated that they practiced Traditional African religions. Only 0.3% of the population described themselves as being atheist, agnostic, or having no religious affiliation.

== Government and politics ==
=== Government ===
The Northern Cape provincial government is based in Kimberley, the provincial capital. The Northern Cape Division of the High Court of South Africa also sits in Kimberley.

Like South Africa's other provinces, the Northern Cape has a parliamentary system of government, with the provincial premier elected by the Northern Cape Provincial Legislature. The premier then selects the members of the provincial Executive Council (cabinet). The current premier is Zamani Saul of the African National Congress (ANC), who has held the position since 2019.

The provincial legislature is elected every five years by a system of party-list proportional representation. In the most recent provincial election, held in 2024, the ANC won a plurality of the vote but failed to win an overall majority of seats. After the election, the ANC declined to form a formal coalition, but the ANC's Zamani Saul was reelected as premier with support from the Patriotic Alliance and Freedom Front Plus. The Democratic Alliance (DA) is the second largest party in the province and forms the official opposition.

The results of the most recent provincial election in 2024 are as follows:

| Party | Votes | % | Seats |
|---|---|---|---|
| African National Congress | 195,267 | 49.34 | 15 |
| Democratic Alliance | 83,848 | 21.19 | 7 |
| Economic Freedom Fighters | 52,433 | 13.25 | 4 |
| Patriotic Alliance | 34,180 | 8.64 | 3 |
| Freedom Front Plus | 7,239 | 1.83 | 1 |
| Northern Cape Communities Movement | 6,547 | 1.65 | – |
| uMkhonto weSizwe | 3,111 | 0.79 | – |
| ActionSA | 2,015 | 0.51 | – |
| Good | 1,849 | 0.47 | – |
| #Hope4SA | 1,745 | 0.44 | – |
| African Christian Democratic Party | 1,498 | 0.38 | – |
| Congress of the People | 1,007 | 0.25 | – |
| Build One South Africa | 995 | 0.25 | – |
| Pan Africanist Congress of Azania | 701 | 0.18 | – |
| Rise Mzansi | 627 | 0.16 | – |
| Africa Restoration Alliance | 458 | 0.12 | – |
| African Congress for Transformation | 453 | 0.11 | – |
| Arise South Africa | 418 | 0.11 | – |
| African Transformation Movement | 412 | 0.10 | – |
| Inkatha Freedom Party | 303 | 0.08 | – |
| People's Movement for Change | 188 | 0.05 | – |
| South African Royal Kingdoms Association | 177 | 0.04 | – |
| All Citizens Party | 173 | 0.04 | – |
| South African Youth Power Party | 138 | 0.03 | – |
| Total | 395,782 | 100.00 | 30 |
Source: Electoral Commission of South Africa

=== Political History ===
The ANC consistently has been the largest party in the Northern Cape since the end of Apartheid, although its position has been less dominant than it traditionally has been in most other provinces. In the first democratic provincial elections in 1994, the ANC emerged as the largest party but failed to win an overall majority of seats. In order to form a majority in the provincial legislature, the ANC reached an agreement with the Democratic Party (DP), which voted for the ANC's Manne Dipico as premier in exchange for the election of the DP's sole MLP, Ethne Papenfus, as speaker of the legislature. The National Party formed the official opposition.

In the 1999 provincial election, the ANC substantially increased its vote share and won an overall majority in the provincial legislature. Thereafter the ANC would continue to maintain a majority in the legislature until 2024.

After the 2004 election, the ANC's Dipuo Peters replaced Dipico as Premier, and the Democratic Alliance (DA) replaced the New National Party as the official opposition. Following the 2009 election, which was again won the by ANC, the ANC's Hazel Jenkins became the new Premier, while the Congress of the People (COPE), a new splinter party from the ANC, had a strong showing and replaced the DA as the official opposition. Jenkins was later replaced as Premier by Sylvia Lucas in 2013.

The 2014 election saw the ANC returned to power once again with an increased mandate, while DA once again became the official opposition, after the collapse of COPE. The newly formed Economic Freedom Fighters (EFF) also entered the legislature for the first time. Sylvia Lucas was re-elected to her first full term as premier.

In the 2019 election, the Northern Cape was considered competitive, with the DA hoping to win the province. In the end, the ANC returned as the majority party, albeit with a reduced majority. The DA was once again the official opposition with an increased seat total. The EFF made gains, while the Freedom Front Plus (FF+) won a seat in the legislature for the first time since 2004. Zamani Saul replaced Lucas as premier after the election.

== Municipalities ==
Northern Cape districts and local municipalities

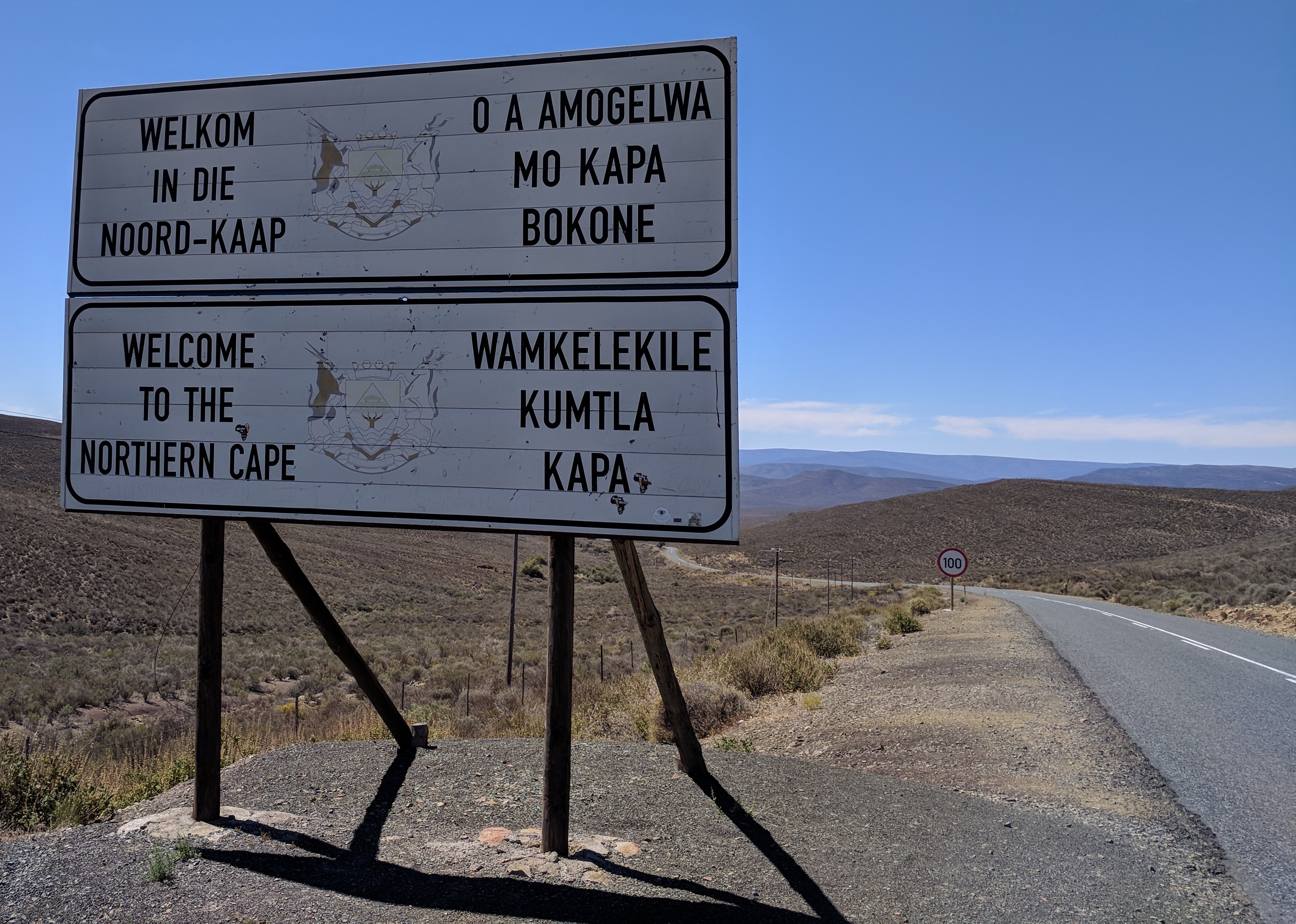
Sign along R354 welcoming motorists into the Northern Cape from the Western Cape. The sign is in Afrikaans (top left), English (bottom left), Tswana (top right), and Xhosa (bottom right)

The Northern Cape Province is divided into five district municipalities. The district municipalities are in turn divided into 27 local municipalities:

=== District municipalities ===
- Frances Baard District
  - Sol Plaatje
  - Dikgatlong
  - Magareng
  - Phokwane
- John Taolo Gaetsewe District
  - Ga-Segonyana
  - Gamagara
  - Joe Morolong
- Namakwa District
  - Richtersveld
  - Nama Khoi
  - Kamiesberg
  - Hantam
  - Karoo Hoogland
  - Khâi-Ma
- Pixley ka Seme District
  - Ubuntu
  - Umsobomvu
  - Emthanjeni
  - Kareeberg
  - Renosterberg
  - Thembelihle
  - Siyathemba
  - Siyancuma
- ZF Mgcawu District (formerly Siyanda)
  - Kai ǃGarib
  - Dawid Kruiper
  - ǃKheis
  - Tsantsabane
  - Kgatelopele

== Cities and towns ==
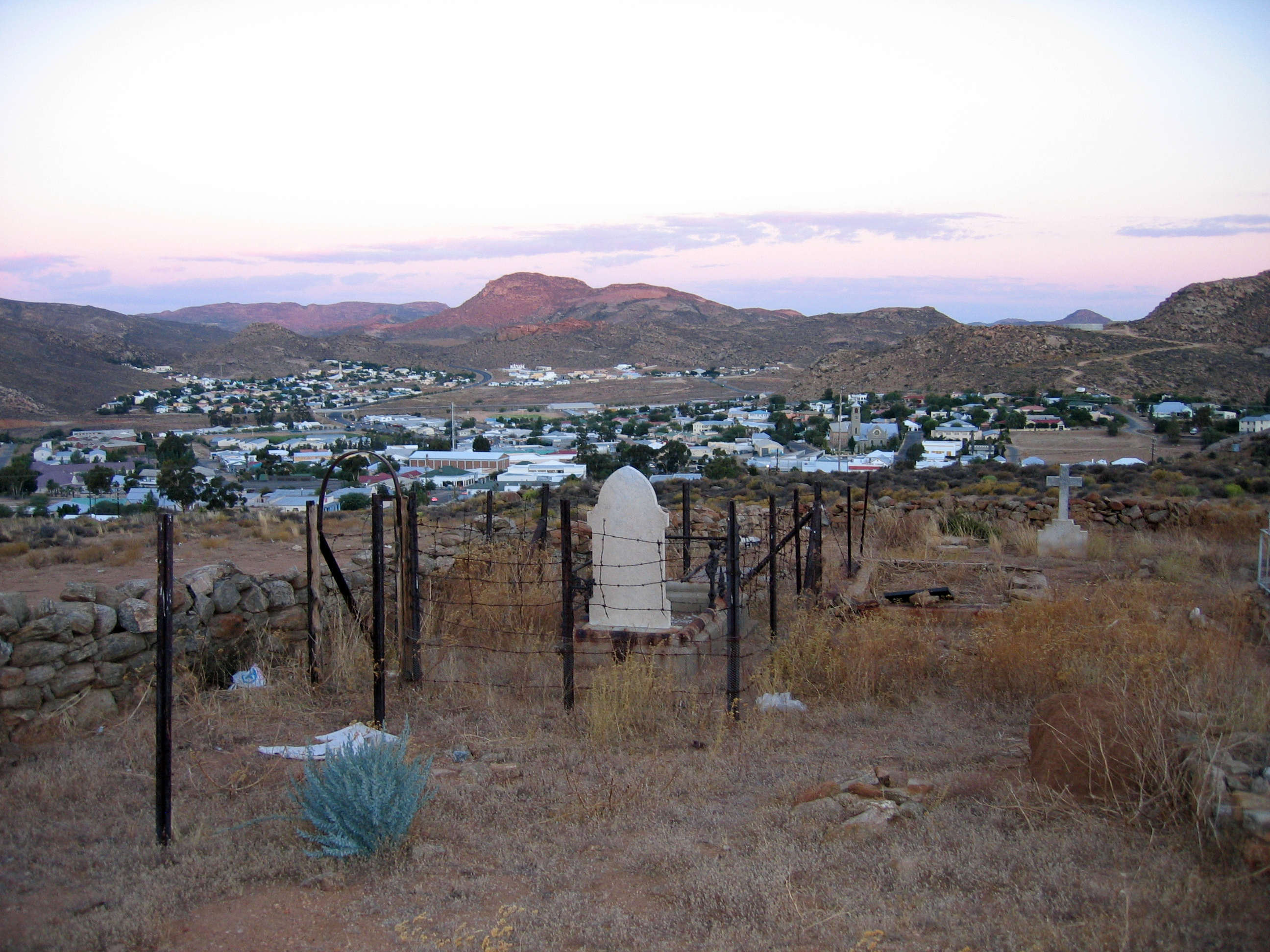
Springbok viewed from the old cemetery

Population 50,000+

- Kimberley
- Upington

Population 10,000+

- Douglas
- Barkly West
- Colesberg
- De Aar
- Jan Kempdorp
- Kathu
- Kuruman
- Postmasburg
- Prieska
- Springbok
- Victoria West
- Warrenton

Population < 10,000

- Orania
- Carnarvon
- Garies
- Griekwastad
- Groblershoop
- Hartswater
- Keimoes
- Kakamas
- Pofadder
- Port Nolloth
- Strydenburg
- Sutherland
- Vanderkloof

== Economy ==
As reported by the Northern Cape Provincial Government, unemployment still remains a big issue in the province. Unemployment was reported to be at 24.9% during Q4, 2013. Unemployment also declined from 119,000 in Q4, 2012 to 109,000 in Q4, 2013.

The Northern Cape is also home to the Square Kilometer Array (SKA), which is located 75 km North-West of Carnarvon.

The economy of the Northern Cape relies heavily on two sectors, mining and agriculture, which employ 57% (Tertiary Sector) of all employees in the province.

Most famous for the diamond mines around Kimberley, it also has mining activities for Manganese and iron ore.

The Northern Cape also has a substantial agricultural area around the Orange River, including most of South Africa's sultana vineyards. Some Wine of Origin areas have been demarcated. The Orange River also attracts visitors who enjoy rafting tours around Vioolsdrif. Extensive sheep raising is the basis of the economy in the southern Karoo areas of the province.

== See also ==
- Northern Cape Provincial Legislature
- Griqualand West
- List of speakers of the Northern Cape Provincial Legislature
