= Executive Council of Limpopo =

Provincial government in South Africa

The Executive Council of Limpopo is the cabinet of the executive branch of the provincial government in the South African province of Limpopo. The Members of the Executive Council (MECs) are appointed from among the members of the Limpopo Provincial Legislature by the Premier of Limpopo, an office held since June 2023 by Phophi Ramathuba.

== Mathale premiership: 2009–2013 ==
Cassel Mathale was elected to his first full term as Premier in the 2009 general election and on 6 May 2009 announced his new Executive Council, in which seven of ten MECs were new to the provincial cabinet. In August 2009, Public Works MEC Pandelani Ramagoma died and was replaced by George Phadagi. However, Phadagi and others were moved to new portfolios on 28 January 2011, when a cabinet reshuffle was announced. A subsequent reshuffle was announced on 13 March 2012 and saw four ministers exit the Executive Council: Phadagi, Dikeledi Magadzi, and Joyce Mashamba were fired, while Soviet Lekganyane resigned pursuant to his election as Provincial Secretary of the Limpopo ANC.

Limpopo Executive Council 2009–2013
Post	Member	Term		Party
Premier of Limpopo	Cassel Mathale	2009	2013	ANC
MEC for Treasury	David Masondo	2011	2013	ANC
MEC for Treasury	Saad Cachalia	2009	2011	ANC
MEC for Health and Social Development	Norman Mabasa	2012	2013	ANC
MEC for Health and Social Development	Dikeledi Magadzi	2011	2012	ANC
MEC for Health and Social Development	Miriam Segabutla	2009	2011	ANC
MEC for Education	Dickson Masemola	2009	2013	ANC
MEC for Economic Development, Environmental Affairs and Tourism	Pinky Kekana	2012	2013	ANC
MEC for Economic Development, Environmental Affairs and Tourism	Pitsi Moloto	2009	2012	ANC
MEC for Agriculture	Jacob Marule	2012	2013	ANC
MEC for Agriculture	Dipuo Letsatsi-Duba	2009	2012	ANC
MEC for Safety and Security	Florence Dzombere	2012	2013	ANC
MEC for Safety and Security	George Phadagi	2011	2012	ANC
MEC for Safety and Security	Dikeledi Magadzi	2009	2011	ANC
MEC for Public Works	Thabitha Mohlala	2011	2013	ANC
MEC for Public Works	George Phadagi	2009	2011	ANC
MEC for Public Works	Pandelani Ramagoma	2009	2009	ANC
MEC for Roads and Transport	Pitsi Moloto	2012	2013	ANC
MEC for Roads and Transport	Pinky Kekana	2009	2012	ANC
MEC for Cooperative Governance, Human Settlements and Traditional Affairs	Clifford Motsepe	2012	2013	ANC
MEC for Local Government and Housing	Soviet Lekganyane	2009	2012	ANC
MEC for Sports, Arts and Culture	Dipuo Letsatsi-Duba	2012	2013	ANC
MEC for Sports, Arts and Culture	Joyce Mashamba	2009	2012	ANC

== Mathabatha premiership ==
=== First term: 2013–2014 ===
Stan Mathabatha was elected Premier in July 2013 after the ANC asked Mathale resign. On 19 July 2013, he announced the composition of his first Executive Council, firing eight of Mathale's ten MECs; only Dickson Masemola and Dipuo Letsatsi-Duba retained their spots in the cabinet, although they were moved to new portfolios.

Limpopo Executive Council 2013–2014
Post	Member	Term		Party
Premier of Limpopo	Stan Mathabatha	2013	2014	ANC
MEC for Treasury	Rudolph Phala	2013	2014	ANC
MEC for Health	Dipuo Letsatsi-Duba	2013	2014	ANC
MEC for Education	Dikeledi Magadzi	2013	2014	ANC
MEC for Economic Development	Seaparo Sekoati	2013	2014	ANC
MEC for Agriculture	Rosina Semenya	2013	2014	ANC
MEC for Human Settlements	Ishmael Kgetjepe	2013	2014	ANC
MEC for Roads and Transport	Lehlogonolo Masoga	2013	2014	ANC
MEC for Public Works	Dickson Masemola	2013	2014	ANC
MEC for Safety and Security	Joyce Mashamba	2013	2014	ANC
MEC for Sports, Arts and Culture	Mirriam Ramadwa	2013	2014	ANC

=== Second term: 2014–2019 ===
In the 2014 general election, Mathabatha was elected to a full term as Premier and announced his new Executive Council, which disbanded the former roads and transport portfolio, merging roads with safety and liaison and roads with public works. On 27 May 2015, he announced a reshuffle affecting only three portfolios (education, health, and treasury); a vacancy had arisen after the death of Education MEC Thembisile Nwedamutswu in January 2015, and Rudolph Phala was the only MEC to be fired. Another three-portfolio reshuffle was announced on 15 September 2016, two months after the death of Agriculture MEC Joy Matshoge.

Mathabatha effected a more comprehensive reshuffle in October 2017 ahead of the ANC's 54th National Conference; his critics, including in the provincial ANC Youth League, labelled the reshuffle a purge of supporters of national President Jacob Zuma because it entailed demotions for Zuma loyalists, such as Mapula Mokaba-Phukwana and Makoma Makhurupetje. Finally, in July 2018, Mathabatha made two appointments to fill vacancies created by the death of Agriculture MEC Joyce Mashamba and the resignation of Sports, Arts and Culture MEC Onicca Moloi.

Limpopo Executive Council 2014–2019
Post	Member	Term		Party
Premier of Limpopo	Stan Mathabatha	2014	2019	ANC
MEC for Treasury	Rob Tooley	2015	2019	ANC
MEC for Treasury	Rudolph Phala	2014	2015	ANC
MEC for Health	Phophi Ramathuba	2015	2019	ANC
MEC for Health	Ishmael Kgetjepe	2014	2015	ANC
MEC for Education	Ishmael Kgetjepe	2015	2019	ANC
MEC for Education	Thembisile Nwedamutswu	2014	2015	ANC
MEC for Economic Development	Seaparo Sekoati	2014	2019	ANC
MEC for Agriculture and Rural Development	Basikopo Makamu	2018	2019	ANC
MEC for Agriculture and Rural Development	Joyce Mashamba	2017	2018	ANC
MEC for Agriculture and Rural Development	Mapula Mokaba-Phukwana	2016	2017	ANC
MEC for Agriculture and Rural Development	Joy Matshoge	2014	2016	ANC
MEC for Public Works, Roads and Infrastructure	Nandi Ndalane	2017	2019	ANC
MEC for Public Works, Roads and Infrastructure	Jerry Ndou	2014	2017	ANC
MEC for Transport, Safety and Liaison	Makoma Makhurupetje	2017	2019	ANC
MEC for Transport, Safety and Liaison	Nandi Ndalane	2016	2017	ANC
MEC for Transport, Safety and Liaison	Mapula Mokaba-Phukwana	2014	2016	ANC
MEC for Co-operative Governance, Human Settlements and Traditional Affairs	Jerry Ndou	2017	2019	ANC
MEC for Co-operative Governance, Human Settlements and Traditional Affairs	Makoma Makhurupetje	2014	2017	ANC
MEC for Social Development and Welfare	Mapula Mokaba-Phukwana	2017	2019	ANC
MEC for Social Development and Welfare	Joyce Mashamba	2014	2017	ANC
MEC for Sports, Arts and Culture	Thandi Moraka	2018	2019	ANC
MEC for Sports, Arts and Culture	Onicca Moloi	2016	2018	ANC
MEC for Sports, Arts and Culture	Nandi Ndalane	2014	2016	ANC

=== Third term: 2019–2024 ===
On 22 May 2019, shortly after he was re-elected in the 2019 general election, Premier Mathabatha announced his new Executive Council, with wide-ranging changes from the cabinet installed in his previous term. On 23 March 2020, he announced his first second-term reshuffle, a minor reshuffle affecting two departments in which one MEC, Monicca Mochadi, was fired.

In June 2022, Mathabatha was re-elected to a third term as ANC Provincial Chairperson in a hotly contested party elective conference. Although he said after the conference that internal party competition would not lead him to reshuffle his executive, he announced a reshuffle at the end of the same month. In the reshuffle, Public Works MEC Dickson Masemola swapped portfolios with Social Development MEC Nkakareng Rakgoale, while Education MEC Polly Boshielo swapped portfolios with Community Safety MEC Mavhungu Lerule-Ramakhanya. This was perceived as a demotion for Masemola and Boshielo and was linked to the ANC elective conference, at which Masemola had run against Mathabatha. Then, in October 2022, Mathabatha announced a wider-ranging reshuffle, affecting five departments, in which he fired Masemola and Boshielo outright; he also sacked the MEC for Sports, Arts and Culture, Thandi Moraka, who, like Masemola and Boshielo, had failed to gain re-election to the ANC Provincial Executive Committee at the party conference in June.

Limpopo Executive Council 2019–2022
Post	Member	Term		Party
Premier of Limpopo	Stan Mathabatha	2019	2024	ANC
MEC for Treasury	Seaparo Sekoati	2019	2024	ANC
MEC for Health	Phophi Ramathuba	2019	2024	ANC
MEC for Education	Mavhungu Lerule-Ramakhanya	2022	2024	ANC
MEC for Education	Polly Boshielo	2019	2022	ANC
MEC for Economic Development, Environment and Tourism	Rodgers Monama	2022	2024	ANC
MEC for Economic Development, Environment and Tourism	Thabo Mokone	2019	2022	ANC
MEC for Transport and Community Safety	Florence Radzilani	2022	2024	ANC
MEC for Transport and Community Safety	Polly Boshielo	2022	2022	ANC
MEC for Transport and Community Safety	Mavhungu Lerule-Ramakhanya	2020	2022	ANC
MEC for Transport and Community Safety	Dickson Masemola	2019	2020	ANC
MEC for Public Works, Roads and Infrastructure	Nkakareng Rakgoale	2022	2024	ANC
MEC for Public Works, Roads and Infrastructure	Dickson Masemola	2020	2022	ANC
MEC for Public Works, Roads and Infrastructure	Monicca Mochadi	2019	2020	ANC
MEC for Agriculture and Rural Development	Thabo Mokone	2022	2024	ANC
MEC for Agriculture and Rural Development	Nandi Ndalane	2019	2022	ANC
MEC for Cooperative Governance, Human Settlements and Traditional Affairs	Basikopo Makamu	2019	2024	ANC
MEC for Sports, Arts and Culture	Nakedi Sibanda-Kekana	2022	2024	ANC
MEC for Sports, Arts and Culture	Thandi Moraka	2019	2022	ANC
MEC for Social Development	Nandi Ndalane	2022	2024	ANC
MEC for Social Development	Dickson Masemola	2022	2022	ANC
MEC for Social Development	Nkakareng Rakgoale	2019	2022	ANC

== Ramathuba premiership: 2024–present ==
Following the 2024 general election, the MEC for Health, Phophi Ramathuba, was elected to succeed Mathabatha as Premier of Limpopo. She named her executive council on 18 June 2024 and the new MECs were sworn in two days later on 20 June.

Limpopo Executive Council 2024–present
Post	Member	Term		Party
Premier of Limpopo	Phophi Ramathuba	2024	Incumbent	ANC
MEC for Agriculture and Rural Development	Nakedi Sibanda-Kekana	2024	Incumbent	ANC
MEC for Economic Development, Environment and Tourism	Tshitereke Matibe	2024	Incumbent	ANC
MEC for Education	Mavhungu Lerule-Ramakhanya	2024	Incumbent	ANC
MEC for Health	Dieketseng Masesi Mashego	2024	Incumbent	ANC
MEC for Co-operative Governance, Human Settlements and Traditional Affairs	Basikopo Makamu	2024	Incumbent	ANC
MEC for Public Works, Roads and Infrastructure	Sebataolo Rachoene	2024	Incumbent	ANC
MEC for Sport, Arts & Culture	Jerry Maseko	2024	Incumbent	ANC
MEC for Transport and Community Safety	Violet Mathye	2024	Incumbent	ANC
MEC for Social Development	Florence Radzilani	2024	Incumbent	ANC
MEC for Provincial Treasury	Kgabo Mahoai	2024	Incumbent	ANC

== See also ==
- Template: Limpopo Executive Council
- Government of South Africa
- Constitution of South Africa
