= Pandelani Ramagoma =

South African politician and civil servant (1957–2009)

Member of the Limpopo Executive Council for Public Works
- In office 6 May 2009 – 10 August 2009
- Premier: Cassel Mathale
- Preceded by: Machwene Semenya
- Succeeded by: George Phadagi

Personal details
- Born: June 1957 Vondwe, Thohoyandou; Northern Transvaal; Union of South Africa
- Died: 10 August 2009 (aged 52)
- Party: African National Congress
- Other political affiliations: South African Communist Party
- Education: University of South Africa; University of the North
- Nickname: Sparks

Pandelani "Sparks" Ramagoma (June 1957 – 10 August 2009) was a South African politician and civil servant who served as Limpopo's Member of the Executive Council (MEC) for Public Works for three months until his death in a car accident in 2009. A former anti-apartheid activist, Ramagoma was a member of the African National Congress (ANC) and served on the party's Provincial Executive Committee. At the time of his death, he was also the Provincial Chairperson of the Limpopo branch of the South African Communist Party.

== Early life and education ==
Ramagoma was born in June 1957 in Vondwe, a village outside Thohoyandou in the former Transvaal, and came from a Venda-speaking family. He entered politics through the anti-apartheid movement in the region and was a regional organiser for the ANC-allied Congress of South African Trade Unions in the Northern Transvaal. He held a Bachelor of Arts in international politics and development from the University of South Africa and a Master's in development from the University of the North.

== Career in government ==
From 2000 to 2005, Ramagoma was the head of the Department of Local Government and Housing in the Limpopo Provincial Government. In 2005, he was appointed as senior general manager for policy coordination in the office of the Premier of Limpopo, an office then held by Sello Moloto. He was also the Limpopo government's provincial coordinator for the 2010 Soccer World Cup.

In the 2009 general election, Ramagoma was elected to an ANC seat in the Limpopo Provincial Legislature. After the election, on 6 May 2009, he was appointed to the Limpopo Executive Council by newly elected Premier Cassel Mathale, who named him as Member of the Executive Council (MEC) for Public Works. At the time of his death, Ramagoma was additionally serving as a member of the Provincial Executive Committee of the ANC's Limpopo branch and as the Provincial Chairperson of the South African Communist Party (SACP) in Limpopo.

== Personal life ==
Ramagoma died in a car accident on the morning on 10 August 2009. He was travelling on the N1 between Makhado and Polokwane, on his way to a government event, when his driver lost control of the vehicle and crashed into a barrier; both died on the scene. Premier Mathale, ANC Secretary-General Gwede Mantashe, and SACP General-Secretary Blade Nzimande were among those who made speeches at his funeral, which was held in Vondwe.

He was married to Mashudu Sophie Rambuda, with whom he had five children.
