= Norman Mabasa =

South African politician

Member of the Limpopo Executive Council for Health and Social Development
- In office 13 March 2012 – 19 July 2013
- Premier: Cassel Mathale
- Preceded by: Dikeledi Magadzi
- Succeeded by: Dipuo Letsatsi-Duba

Personal details
- Citizenship: South Africa
- Party: African National Congress

Norman Mabasa was a South African medical doctor and politician who served as Limpopo's Member of the Executive Council (MEC) for Health and Social Development from March 2012 until July 2013. During that time, he represented the African National Congress in the Limpopo Provincial Legislature. Mabasa was the chairperson of the South African Medical Association before his appointment as MEC and he remains a general practitioner by profession.

== Career ==
Mabasa is a medical doctor and worked as a general practitioner. In 1999, he joined the board of the South African Medical Association (SAMA), a non-statutory professional association. He served a term as president of SAMA and was elected its chairperson in October 2009.

On 14 March 2012, Cassel Mathale, then the Premier of Limpopo, announced that Mabasa would join the Free State Executive Council as MEC for Health and Social Development, replacing Dikeledi Magadzi. He resigned from SAMA in order to take up the position and was sworn in to the Free State Provincial Legislature, representing the African National Congress. However, Mabasa remained in office as MEC for less than two years: in July 2013, Mathale was replaced by Premier Stan Mathabatha, who fired eight of Mathale's ten MECs, including Mabasa.

Mabasa served the remainder of the legislative term as an ordinary Member of the Provincial Legislature but did not seek re-election in the 2014 general election. As of 2021, he had returned to his practice as a general practitioner in Kagiso in Krugersdorp, Gauteng while also serving as chairperson of the Unity of Forum of Family Practitioners, a lobby group.
