= Joy Matshoge =

South African politician

Member of the Limpopo Executive Council for Agriculture and Rural Development
- Premier: Stan Mathabatha
- Preceded by: Rosina Semenya (for Agriculture)
- Succeeded by: Mapula Mokaba-Phukwana

Personal details
- Born: 1959 or 1960
- Died: 25 June 2016 (aged 56) Limpopo, South Africa
- Citizenship: South Africa
- Party: African National Congress

Bertha Amanda Joyce Matshoge (1959/1960 – 25 June 2016), commonly known as Joy Matshoge, was a South African politician who served as Limpopo's Member of the Executive Council (MEC) for Agriculture and Rural Development from May 2014 until her death in June 2016. Before that, from 2013 to 2014, she was the Deputy Speaker of the Limpopo Provincial Legislature, where she had represented the African National Congress (ANC) since 2008. At the time of her death, she was also the Provincial Chairperson of the ANC Women's League in Limpopo, a position to which she had been elected in September 2015.

== Political career ==
Matshoge was formerly a nurse and later worked as a manager in the social services division at Modimolle Local Municipality and Waterberg District Municipality. She was first sworn in as a Member of the Limpopo Provincial Legislature in 2008. She was re-elected to her seat in the 2009 general election and in July 2013 she succeeded Joyce Mashamba as Deputy Speaker in the provincial legislature, deputising Elias Nong.

The following year, in the 2014 general election, she was re-elected to her legislative seat, ranked 18th on the ANC's provincial party list. She was also appointed to the Limpopo Executive Council by Premier Stan Mathabatha, who named her as MEC for Agriculture and Rural Development. While she was in office, the opposition Democratic Alliance lodged a formal complaint against her with the Public Protector, Thuli Madonsela, alleging that she had benefitted unduly from a government project devised to award cattle to poor farmers. Specifically, it was alleged that Matshoge had awarded herself 51 Nguni cattle, worth about R1-million, between November 2013 and July 2014. As of November 2015, the Public Protector's investigation was ongoing.

Also during her tenure as an MEC, in September 2015, Matshoge was elected unopposed as Provincial Chairperson of the Limpopo branch of the ANC Women's League; she succeeded Maite Marutha, who declined a nomination to stand for re-election. She remained in that office at the time of her death in 2016.

== Personal life and death ==
Matshoge was married to Chesane and had two sons, Fandi and Karabo, and one daughter, Gontse. She died in a car accident on 25 June 2016 at the age of 56. She had been travelling alone on the N1 between Mookgophong and Mokopane when her vehicle overturned. President Jacob Zuma granted her a provincial official funeral, and Pinky Kekana, then the Deputy Minister of Communications, spoke at a memorial lecture held in her honour in August 2018. In September 2016, Mapula Mokaba-Phukwana was appointed to succeed her as MEC for Agriculture and Rural Development.
