= Thandi Moraka =

South African politician (born 1983)

The Honourable Thandi Moraka MP

Deputy Minister of International Relations and Cooperation
- Incumbent
- Assumed office 3 July 2024 Serving with Alvin Botes
- President: Cyril Ramaphosa
- Minister: Ronald Lamola
- Preceded by: Candith Mashego-Dlamini

Member of the National Assembly
- Incumbent
- Assumed office 14 June 2024

Member of the Limpopo Executive Council for Sports, Arts and Culture
- In office July 2018 – October 2022
- Premier: Stan Mathabatha
- Preceded by: Onicca Moloi
- Succeeded by: Nakedi Sibanda-Kekana

Deputy Secretary-General of the African National Congress Youth League
- In office September 2015 – July 2019
- President: Collen Maine
- Secretary-General: Njabulo Nzuza
- Preceded by: Kenetswe Mosenogi
- Succeeded by: Tsakani Shiviti

Personal details
- Born: 15 October 1983 (age 43)
- Party: African National Congress

Anna Tandi Moraka (born 15 October 1983), commonly known as Thandi Moraka, is a South African politician from Limpopo. A member of the African National Congress (ANC), she has been the Deputy Minister of International Relations and Cooperation since July 2024. She joined the National Assembly of South Africa in the 2024 general election.

Between 2009 and 2024, Moraka was a Member of the Limpopo Provincial Legislature. During that time she was Member of the Executive Council (MEC) for Sports, Arts and Culture in the Limpopo provincial government between July 2018 and October 2022. In December 2022 she was elected to a five-year term on the ANC's National Executive Committee. She formerly served as Deputy Secretary-General of the ANC Youth League from 2015 to 2019 and as a member of the Limpopo ANC's Provincial Executive Committee from 2018 to 2022.

== Early life and career ==
Moraka was born on 15 October 1983. She rose to prominence as an activist in the African National Congress (ANC) and ANC Youth League (ANCYL). Her local ANC branch is in Modimolle in the Waterberg region of South Africa's Limpopo province.

== Provincial legislature: 2009–2024 ==
In the April 2009 general election, Moraka was elected to represent the ANC in the Limpopo Provincial Legislature, ranked 34th on the ANC's party list in the province. She served three terms in her seat, gaining re-election in the 2014 general election, ranked 13th on the ANC's provincial party list, and in the 2019 general election, ranked 26th on the party list.

=== ANCYL Makhado conference: 2010 ===
During her early legislative career, Moraka was also Deputy Provincial Secretary of the ANCYL's Limpopo branch, then under the leadership of ANCYL Provincial Chairperson Lehlogonolo Masoga. At the provincial ANCYL's elective conference in Makhado in April 2010, Moraka and other incumbent leaders were voted out of their positions and replaced by allies of national ANCYL president Julius Malema, amid procedural disruptions and police intervention. The Star labelled her a member of the "Makhado brigade", a group led by Masoga which "openly defied" Malema at the conference.

==== Arrest ====
On 10 April 2010, as Moraka drove home from the chaotic Makhado conference, she was arrested by an off-duty traffic officer on the N1 near Botlokwa and detained briefly at Mphephu police station. The ANCYL alleged that she had stolen important league documents which accredited the delegates to the conference and without which the conference could not proceed. Her arrest was viewed as retaliation by the pro-Malema faction of the ANCYL.

The national leadership of the ANCYL laid a criminal charge of theft against Moraka, pertaining to the documents allegedly taken by her, and released a statement providing the following account of the incident:

Despite the calls made by the President of the ANCYL for delegates to return to the conference some persisted in their actions without regard for the majority of delegates. The former Deputy Secretary of the ANCYL Cde Thandi Moraka stole the conference credentials and attempted to flee from Makhado en route to Polokwane. She was then located by the police and found in possession of the conference credentials, an ID document and accreditation tags of delegates determined to collapse [render inquorate] the Provincial Conference of the ANCYL. A criminal case of theft was opened against her.

On 19 July 2010, Moraka appeared in the Dzanani Magistrate's Court and the theft case was struck off the court roll. Moraka welcomed the decision, saying that the matter was an internal political dispute unsuitable for litigation.

==== Public Protector's report ====
After her arrest, Moraka laid a complaint with the Public Protector, Thuli Madonsela; she alleged that her arrest had been ordered by Pinky Kekana, who was then the Member of the Executive Council (MEC) for Roads and Transport in the Limpopo provincial government and who was viewed as an ally of Malema. Kekana dismissed this allegation as "malicious".

The report of Madonsela's investigation, entitled "State Power – Political Games", was released in late September 2012 and concluded that Moraka's arrest had been unlawful. According to Madonsela, the arrest had indeed been ordered by Kekana, an improper directive which amounted to an abuse of power and to maladministration in that Kekana "employed state resources to settle a political score" in respect of private party-political rivalries. Madonsela also pointed out that the arrest had been unnecessary because Moraka had voluntarily cooperated with the officer who pulled her over and because no criminal charge had been laid against her at that time. By way of remedial action, Madonsela instructed Kekana to apologise to Moraka and also instructed the Premier of Limpopo to "take disciplinary action" against Kekana.

=== ANCYL Provincial Deputy Chairperson: 2015 ===
On 4 May 2015, at a provincial league elective conference near Tzaneen, Moraka returned to the provincial leadership of the Limpopo ANCYL. She was elected as the Deputy Provincial Chairperson, serving under Provincial Chairperson Vincent Shoba.

=== ANCYL Deputy Secretary: 2015–2019 ===
Later in 2015, on 4 September, the national ANCYL held its 25th national elective conference in Gauteng's Midrand and Moraka was elected unopposed to the more senior position of national ANCYL Deputy Secretary-General. She deputised ANCYL secretary-general Njabulo Nzuza. She and the other officials remained in office until late July 2019, when the national ANC leadership disbanded the ANCYL leadership corps.

According to the Mail & Guardian, during this period Moraka had an increasingly tense relationship with ANCYL president Collen Maine. In April 2018, speaking at an ANC Women's League memorial service for Winnie Madikizela-Mandela, Moraka said that Maine was "a sellout of note" and called for his resignation. Her remarks followed Maine's public confession that he had met with the controversial Gupta family; according to Moraka, this revelation showed that, during the presidency of Jacob Zuma, Maine had been hypocritical in benefitting from state capture while publicly denying that it existed.

=== Limpopo Executive Council: 2018–2022 ===
In June 2018, at a provincial elective conference of the mainstream ANC, Moraka was elected to an ordinary seat of the Provincial Executive Committee of the ANC in Limpopo. She was also elected to its Provincial Working Committee. Shortly afterwards, in late July 2018, Moraka was appointed to the Limpopo Executive Council by the Premier of Limpopo, Stan Mathabatha. She became MEC for Sports, Arts and Culture, succeeding Onicca Moloi. The ANCYL welcomed her appointment. She was retained in the position after the 2019 general election.

In September 2021, News24 published an exposé alleging that Moraka had received R600,000 in kickbacks from a slush fund funded by Eskom contractors. She apparently received the money between 2016 and 2017 at the instruction of senior Eskom official France Hlakudi, who was accused of corruption in relation to the contract to build Kusile Power Station. Moraka said the payments were a loan from a friend. The opposition Democratic Alliance called for Moraka to be investigated for corruption, and Premier Mathabatha commissioned an internal investigation. Meanwhile Moraka brought an urgent defamation suit against News24 in the Limpopo High Court, which was struck off the court roll on the grounds of lack of urgency.

In May 2022, as the next ANC provincial elective conference approached, Moraka confirmed that she had been asked to stand for election as Deputy Provincial Chairperson of the Limpopo ANC, and intended to do so, running against the incumbent, Florence Radzilani. However, when the elective conference was held in June 2022, Moraka's bid to unseat Radzilani failed. She also failed to gain re-election to the Provincial Executive Committee.

In early October 2022, Mathabatha fired Moraka from the Limpopo Executive Council, replacing her with Nakedi Sibanda-Kekana. The reshuffle was viewed as connected to the recent ANC elective conference: the other two MECs fired in the reshuffle, Polly Boshielo and Dickson Masemola, had, like Moraka, failed to gain re-election to the Provincial Executive Committee. Although she left the Executive Council, Moraka remained an ordinary Member of the Provincial Legislature.

=== ANC National Executive Committee: 2022–2024 ===
When the national ANC held its 55th National Conference in December 2022, Moraka was elected to a five-year term on the party's National Executive Committee; by number of votes received, she was ranked last of the 80 candidates elected, receiving 946 votes across the 4,029 ballots cast in total. City Press said that she was viewed as an ally of Cyril Ramaphosa, the incumbent ANC president and President of South Africa. At the National Executive Committee's first meeting in February 2023, Moraka was elected as chairperson of the subcommittee on arts and culture, deputised by Donald Selamolela.

== National executive: 2024–present ==
In the next general election in May 2024, Moraka was elected to an ANC seat in the National Assembly, the lower house of the South African Parliament. She was ranked 26th on the ANC's national party list. Announcing his third cabinet on 30 June 2024, President Ramaphosa appointed her to replace Candith Mashego-Dlamini as Deputy Minister of International Relations and Cooperation. In that capacity she deputised Minister Ronald Lamola and served alongside Deputy Minister Alvin Botes.
