= Rob Tooley =

South African politician

Member of the Limpopo Executive Council for Treasury
- In office 27 May 2015 – 7 May 2019
- Premier: Stan Mathabatha
- Preceded by: Rudolph Phala
- Succeeded by: Seaparo Sekoati

Member of the Limpopo Provincial Legislature
- In office 21 May 2014 – 7 May 2019
- In office April 1994 – February 2007

Personal details
- Born: 18 June 1960 (age 65) Tzaneen, Transvaal; South Africa
- Party: African National Congress
- Education: Pretoria Boys High School
- Alma mater: Stellenbosch University

Robert William Noel Tooley (born 18 June 1960) is a South African politician and civil servant who served as Limpopo's Member of the Executive Council (MEC) for Treasury from 2015 to 2019 under Premier Stan Mathabatha. He represented the African National Congress (ANC) in the Limpopo Provincial Legislature from 1994 to 2007 and later from 2014 to 2019.

== Early life and career ==
Tooley was born on 18 June 1960 in Tzaneen in present-day Limpopo province, then part of the Transvaal. He matriculated at Pretoria Boys High School in 1978 and graduated with a degree in agriculture from Stellenbosch University in 1983. According to Tooley, he joined the ANC in the same year, at the height of apartheid. After several months working in Europe as a farm labourer, he returned to South Africa in mid-1984 and established a subtropical fruit farm.

== Political career ==
In 1994, following South Africa's first democratic elections, Tooley left farming to begin his first stint in the Limpopo Provincial Legislature, which lasted from 1994 to 2007. During that time he served on the legislature's Standing Committee on Public Accounts (Scopa) from 1995 to 2004 and its Portfolio Committee on Finance from 2004 to 2007.

He left the provincial legislature in February 2007 when he was appointed head of department in the Limpopo Treasury, then under MEC Saad Cachalia. In April 2010, he moved to the Limpopo Tourism Agency, where he was chief executive officer until 2012.

Pursuant to the 2014 general election, Tooley returned to the Limpopo Provincial Legislature, ranked 37th on the ANC's provincial party list, and in June 2014 he was appointed to chair Scopa. On 27 May 2015, he was appointed to the Limpopo Executive Council by Stan Mathabatha, the incumbent Premier of Limpopo, who named him MEC for Treasury in a cabinet reshuffle. The opposition Democratic Alliance and Economic Freedom Fighters both welcomed his appointment.

Tooley remained in the Treasury until 2019 and he was additionally appointed acting MEC for Sports, Arts and Culture, after the incumbent, Onicca Moloi, resigned in 2018. Also in 2018, he entered into a public spat with David Masondo, who had been Treasury MEC between 2011 and 2013, when he allegedly publicly that Masondo and Julius Malema had contributed to the financial mismanagement of the province. Masondo accused Tooley of "lying", pointed out that Tooley had been a public servant in the Treasury only shortly before Masondo was appointed MEC, and suggested that Tooley was attempting to divert attention from ongoing maladministration in his department.

Ahead of the 2019 general election, the Citizen reported that Tooley was one of three individuals whom the party had nominated to stand as the ANC's candidate for Premier of Limpopo; also on the list were Mathabatha and Nandi Ndalane. However, Tooley was only listed 41st on the ANC's party list in the election and he did not secure re-election to his seat in the legislature. In July 2019, he was instead appointed as chairperson of the Musina-Makhado Special Economic Zone. In this role he worked alongside Lehlogonolo Masoga, another former MEC, who was appointed chief executive officer of the zone the following month.

== Personal life ==
Tooley has three children.
