= Miriam Segabutla =

South African politician

Member of the Limpopo Executive Council for Health and Social Development
- In office 6 May 2009 – 28 January 2011
- Premier: Cassel Mathale
- Preceded by: Seaparo Sekoati
- Succeeded by: Dikeledi Magadzi

Personal details
- Born: 1960 or 1961 (age 65–66)
- Citizenship: South Africa
- Party: African National Congress

Miriam Reshoketsoe Keneiloe Segabutla (born 1960 or 1961) is a South African politician who served as Limpopo's Member of the Executive Council (MEC) for Health and Social Development from May 2009 to January 2011 during the premiership of Cassel Mathale. In 2013, she was charged with fraud and corruption in connection with contracts that her department had tendered during her time as MEC. She is a member of the African National Congress (ANC) and served on the party's National Executive Committee from 2012 to 2017.

== Career in government ==
In the 2009 general election, Segabutla was ranked 24th on the ANC's provincial party list and secured election to a seat in the Limpopo Provincial Legislature. After the election, on 6 May 2009, newly elected Premier Cassel Mathale announced that she would join the Limpopo Executive Council as MEC for Health and Social Development, replacing Seaparo Sekoati. She served in that office until 28 January 2011, when she was removed in a cabinet reshuffle and replaced by Dikeledi Magadzi.

Later in 2011, President Jacob Zuma appointed Segabutla as South Africa's Ambassador to Cuba. She resigned from the Limpopo Provincial Legislature and embarked upon a diplomatic training course in Pretoria. The following year, at the ANC's 53rd National Conference in Mangaung in December 2012, Segabutla was elected to a five-year term as a member of the ANC's National Executive Committee; by number of votes received, she ranked 73rd of the 80 ordinary members elected. She later worked as a chief director in the national Department of International Relations and Cooperation.

== Fraud charges ==
In June 2010, while still serving as MEC, Segabutla was the subject of a formal complaint lodged with the Public Protector relating to alleged procurement irregularities. The incumbent Public Protector, Thuli Madonsela, initiated an investigation, which continued after Segabutla was fired from the Executive Council. Madonsela's report, published in February 2013 and titled Befuddled Interest, concluded that Segabutla had made herself vulnerable to a conflict of interest and therefore had "acted in a manner that is inconsistent with the position that she occupied, and that was not in the best interests of the department".

On 26 March 2013, Segabutla was arrested by the Hawks and charged with fraud in the Polokwane Magistrate's Court. Her co-accused were two businessmen, Pieter Erasmus and Jonny Lucas, whose companies had signed the 2010 contracts with Segabutla's department. The contracts were worth a combined R16 million and had been awarded without a competitive tender process. In addition, according to City Press, there was evidence that the companies had provided Segabutla and her family with kickbacks worth at least R154,000 between 2009 and 2010.

She was released on R25,000 bail, but the ANC – through spokesman Jackson Mthembu – urged Segabutla to refrain from participating in party leadership activities until her name had been cleared. In 2017, the trial remained ongoing and Eyewitness News reported that Segabutla's attorney, Gert van der Merwe, had turned state's witness. In a leaked affidavit, van der Merwe apparently described how he had helped to channel funds from Lucas to Segabutla.

== Personal life ==
Segabutla was married to Phillip Segabutla, a public servant in the provincial government, with whom she has a daughter named Precious. She filed for divorce in 2010.
