= Dickson Masemola =

South African politician (born 1968)

Dickson Masemola MP

Delegate to the National Council of Provinces
- Incumbent
- Assumed office 6 October 2022

Member of the Limpopo Provincial Legislature
- In office March 2009 – 6 October 2022
- Premier: Cassel Mathale; Stan Mathabatha

Member of the Limpopo Executive Council for Social Development
- In office June 2022 – 6 October 2022
- Premier: Stan Mathabatha
- Preceded by: Nkakareng Rakgoale
- Succeeded by: Nandi Ndalane

Member of the Limpopo Executive Council for Public Works, Roads and Infrastructure
- In office March 2020 – June 2022
- Premier: Stan Mathabatha
- Succeeded by: Nkakareng Rakgoale

Member of the Limpopo Executive Council for Transport
- In office 27 May 2019 – March 2020
- Premier: Stan Mathabatha
- Succeeded by: Mavhungu Lerule-Ramakhanya

Member of the Limpopo Executive Council for Public Works
- In office July 2013 – May 2014
- Premier: Stan Mathabatha
- Preceded by: Thabitha Mohlala

Member of the Limpopo Executive Council for Education
- In office May 2009 – July 2013
- Premier: Cassel Mathale
- Succeeded by: Dikeledi Magadzi

Deputy Provincial Chairperson of the Limpopo African National Congress
- In office July 2008 – March 2013
- Preceded by: Joyce Mashamba
- Succeeded by: Jerry Ndou

Personal details
- Born: 11 January 1968 (age 58) Ga-Marishane, Sekhukhune; Limpopo, South Africa
- Party: African National Congress
- Education: University of Limpopo (PhD)

Namane Dickson Masemola (born 11 January 1968) is a South African politician who currently serves as Deputy Minister for the Department of Cooperative Governance and Traditional Affairs in the Government of National Unity (GNU) since June 2024. He has previously served as a Delegate to the National Council of Provinces since October 2022. Between 2009 and 2022, he was a Member of the Provincial Legislature in the Limpopo provincial government, representing the African National Congress (ANC), and held a variety of positions in the Limpopo Executive Council.

Masemola began his political career as Executive Mayor of his hometown, Sekhukhune District Municipality, from 2001 to 2009. From 2008 to 2013 he served under Cassel Mathale as Deputy Provincial Chairperson of the ANC in Limpopo. Simultaneously, he served in Mathale's government as Member of the Executive Council (MEC) for Education. Under Mathale's successor, incumbent Premier Stan Mathabatha, Masemola was MEC for Public Works (2013–2014); MEC for Transport (2019–2020); MEC for Public Works, Roads and Infrastructure (2020–2022); and MEC for Social Development (2022).

In June 2022, Masemola campaigned unsuccessfully to depose Mathabatha as ANC Provincial Chairperson. Several months later, he was transferred to his current seat in the national Parliament.

== Early life and education ==
Masemola was born in 1967 or 1968 in Ga-Marishane in the Sekhukhune region of what is now South Africa's Limpopo province. In his youth he was active in anti-apartheid student politics, including through the South African Students Congress and local organisations affiliated to the South African Youth Congress. He later joined the African National Congress (ANC) and volunteered in the party's election campaign during South Africa's first democratic elections in 1994.

In 2021, Masemola received a doctorate in administration from the University of Limpopo. His thesis was about "the impact of leadership on socio-economic development of municipalities" in South Africa.

== Career ==
Masemola entered local government in 1999 and served as the Executive Mayor of Sekhukhune District Municipality from 2001 to 2009. According to the Independent Online, the municipality received poor audit outcomes during Masemola's tenure, including six consecutive disclaimers from 2004 to 2009.

While mayor, Masemola rose through the ranks of the local ANC and ultimately became the Regional Chairperson of the party's Sekhukhune regional branch. At a provincial elective conference in July 2008, held at the University of Venda, Masemola was elected Deputy Provincial Chairperson of the ANC in Limpopo, beating Motalane Monakedi by 238 votes. In this capacity he deputised Cassel Mathale.

=== Mathale premiership: 2009–2013 ===
In March 2009, Masemola resigned as mayor and was sworn into the Limpopo provincial legislature, filling a casual vacancy that arose after Sello Moloto, the incumbent Premier of Limpopo, defected from the ANC and was replaced by Mathale. Masemola subsequently served as acting Member of the Executive Council (MEC) for Roads and Transport in the Limpopo provincial government.

In the April 2009 general election, Masemola was reelected to the provincial legislature and Mathale appointed him MEC for Education. He served in that office until 2013 and presided over substantial controversy in the provincial Department of Education. In December 2011, the department was one of five in Limpopo that was placed under administration by the national government. In 2012, the Mail & Guardian alleged that he had improperly influenced the department's procurement processes, leading the opposition Democratic Alliance (DA) to lay a complaint against him with the Public Protector, and in the same year he was blamed for the so-called Limpopo textbook crisis, which left thousands of Limpopo schoolchildren without school books and which the Mail & Guardian described as "arguably the largest, longest and most acutely embarrassing education debacle since 1994".

While Education MEC, Masemola was reelected ANC Deputy Provincial Chairperson in December 2011 on a slate aligned to Mathale, who was also re-elected. However, in subsequent months, he fell out with Mathale and with Mathale's close ally Julius Malema: Masemola remained a staunch and vocal ally of President Jacob Zuma, while Mathale, Malema, and the rest of the ANC Limpopo Provincial Executive Committee had turned against Zuma and publicly called for him to be removed as ANC President at the ANC's upcoming national elective conference. In March 2013, shortly after Zuma won re-election, the ANC National Executive Committee under Zuma announced that it had disbanded the entire Limpopo Provincial Executive Committee "for displaying totally un-ANC behaviour and institutionalised factional conduct". This decision prematurely ended Masemola's term as ANC Deputy Provincial Chairperson. However, it was fairly widely anticipated that Zuma would fire Mathale as Premier and appoint Masemola to replace him.

=== Mathabatha premiership: 2013–2022 ===
In July 2013, the ANC asked Mathale to resign as expected, but Mathale was replaced as Premier not by Masemola but by Stan Mathabatha, who had been living abroad as an ambassador. The same week, Mathabatha announced a major reshuffle of the Limpopo Executive Council. Masemola was one of only two of Mathale's MECs who was not fired, but he was transferred from the Education portfolio to the Public Works portfolio. As the Limpopo ANC prepared to elect a new provincial party leadership, Masemola launched an abortive challenge to Mathabatha's bid to be elected ANC Provincial Chairperson; he withdrew his candidacy at the elective conference, held in February 2014, and Mathabatha secured the post.

In the 2014 general election, Masemola was reelected to a second full term in the Limpopo provincial legislature, having been ranked ninth on the ANC's provincial party list. However, Mathabatha did not reappoint him to the Executive Council, reportedly because he was displeased that Masemola had challenged him in the ANC's internal elections the previous year. Instead, Masemola spent the parliamentary term as an ordinary Member of the Provincial Legislature, serving on the legislature's committees on public administration, agriculture and rural development, and social development. At the Limpopo ANC's next elective conference in June 2018, Mathabatha was re-elected unopposed as Provincial Chairperson, but Masemola was elected as an ordinary member of the Provincial Executive Committee.

In the 2019 general election, Masemola was ranked fifth on the ANC's provincial party list and was reelected to the provincial legislature. Mathabatha appointed him MEC for Transport. Jacques Smalle, the provincial leader of the opposition DA, said that Masemola's appointment "had me scratching my head". In a subsequent reshuffle in March 2020, he became MEC for Public Works, Roads and Infrastructure. At that time Masemola was also the chairperson of the board at MINTEK, a mining research company.

Masemola was viewed as a likely candidate in the race to succeed Mathabatha, who said in 2021 that he would not seek re-election as ANC Provincial Chairperson. However, at the Limpopo ANC's next elective conference in March 2022, Mathabatha did run for a third term and Masemola, despite initially standing only for election as Deputy Provincial Chairperson, ran against him on the ballot. Masemola's campaign emphasised what the Daily Maverick called a "strong anti-corruption stance" and he, like Mathabatha, endorsed incumbent ANC President Cyril Ramaphosa. Masemola's candidacy was supported by the ANC's Norman Mashabane region (in Mopani), the largest in Limpopo, and by Soviet Lekganyane, the outgoing ANC Provincial Secretary. His proposed slate would have seen Pule Shayi elected as his deputy and Lekganyane re-elected as Provincial Secretary. However, at the provincial conference, Mathabatha's slate won a clean sweep of the top positions, and Mathabatha himself won re-election in a landslide, earning 781 votes against Masemola's 389.

After the conference, Mathabatha dismissed rumours of an imminent Executive Council reshuffle, saying, "It is not the first time that comrade Dickson contests me. It is not the first time and we remain friends, that has nothing to do with our deployment in government". However, in June, Mathabatha moved Masemola to the Social Development portfolio, which was viewed as a demotion. Then, on 6 October, Mathabatha fired Masemola from the Executive Council; the ANC announced that Masemola would be "re-deployed" to the national Parliament, where he was sworn in as a Member of the National Council of Provinces. Ahead of the ANC's 55th National Conference in December 2022, Masemola was nominated to stand for election to the ANC's 80-member National Executive Committee; he was nominated by 248 local party branches and was therefore the 98th most popular candidate.
