= Dipuo Letsatsi-Duba =

South African politician (born 1965)

Member of the National Assembly
- In office 21 May 2014 – 5 June 2019

Minister of State Security
- In office 26 February 2018 – 29 May 2019
- President: Cyril Ramaphosa
- Deputy: Ellen Molekane
- Preceded by: Bongani Bongo
- Succeeded by: Ayanda Dlodlo

Deputy Minister of Public Service and Administration
- In office 31 March 2017 – 26 February 2018
- President: Jacob Zuma
- Minister: Faith Muthambi
- Preceded by: Gratitude Magwanishe
- Succeeded by: Chana Pilane-Majake

Chairperson of the Portfolio Committee on Public Enterprises
- In office 25 June 2014 – 31 March 2017
- Speaker: Baleka Mbete
- Preceded by: Peter Maluleka
- Succeeded by: Lungi Gcabashe

Member of the Limpopo Provincial Legislature
- In office 6 May 2009 – 6 May 2014

Personal details
- Born: Dipuo Bertha Letsatsi; 25 September 1965 (age 61) Katlehong, Transvaal; South Africa
- Party: African National Congress
- Spouse: Mose Jacob Duba (died 2008)

Dipuo Bertha Letsatsi-Duba (born 25 September 1965) is a South African politician who is currently serving as South African Ambassador to Turkey. She served as Minister of State Security in the first cabinet of President Cyril Ramaphosa from February 2018 to May 2019. Before that, she was Deputy Minister of Public Service and Administration from March 2017 to February 2018.

A member of the African National Congress (ANC), Letsatsi-Duba previously served in the Limpopo Provincial Legislature from 2009 to 2014, holding three different portfolios in the Limpopo Executive Council under Premiers Cassel Mathale and Stan Mathabatha. After that, from 2014 to 2019, she served in the National Assembly, where she was chairperson of Parliament's Portfolio Committee on Public Enterprises until President Jacob Zuma appointed her as a deputy minister in 2017. She resigned from the National Assembly in early June 2019 after failing to gain an appointment to Ramaphosa's second-term cabinet.

Born in Gauteng, Letsatsi-Duba entered politics during apartheid as a recruit of Umkhonto we Sizwe in exile. She has been a member of the ANC National Executive Committee since December 2012.

== Early life and career ==
Letsatsi-Duba was born on 25 September 1965 in Katlehong, a township east of Johannesburg in the former Transvaal Province. In 1982, aged 18, she went into exile with the outlawed African National Congress (ANC), joining the party's military wing, Umkhonto we Sizwe. She completed her secondary education at Luanshya Girls High School in Luanshya, Zambia, and she later completed two postgraduate diplomas, one in Cuba in 1987 and another in Zimbabwe in 1992. Her work for the exiled ANC included service in the party's intelligence structures.

In 1992, during the negotiations to end apartheid, Letsatsi-Duba returned to South Africa. From then until 1994, she was a media liaison officer in the ANC's headquarters at Shell House. She was also editor-in-chief of Voice of Women, the official journal of the ANC Women's League. She later moved to Limpopo, where she entered business. However, she remained active in the ANC: she was elected to the party's Provincial Executive Committee in Limpopo in 2007, and in July 2008, she was elected as Provincial Treasurer, serving under Provincial Chairperson Cassel Mathale. She remained in the treasury until December 2011, when she was succeeded by Pinky Kekana.

== Provincial government: 2009–2014 ==
While serving as ANC Provincial Treasurer, Letsatsi-Duba stood as an ANC candidate in the 2009 general election and was elected to a seat in the Limpopo Provincial Legislature. In addition, Cassel Mathale, in his capacity as Premier of Limpopo, appointed her to the Limpopo Executive Council as Member of the Executive Council (MEC) for Agriculture. Mathale subsequently moved her to become MEC for Sports, Arts and Culture in March 2012. While serving in the latter position, Letsatsi-Duba attended the ANC's 53rd National Conference in December 2012 and won election to a five-year term as a member of the ANC National Executive Committee.

When Stan Mathabatha succeeded Mathale as Premier in July 2013, Letsatsi-Duba was one of only two of Mathale's ministers whom Mathabatha retained, the other being Dickson Masemola. Mathabatha appointed her as MEC for Health, a position which she retained until the 2014 general election.

== National government: 2014–2019 ==
=== Portfolio Committee on Public Enterprises: 2014–2017 ===
In the 2014 election, Letsatsi-Duba was elected to an ANC seat in the National Assembly, the lower house of the South African Parliament. In the aftermath of the election, the ANC announced that it would nominate her to chair Parliament's Portfolio Committee on Public Enterprises.

Letsatsi-Duba's tenure in the committee coincided with revelations about alleged state capture, especially affecting state-owned entities. Later, in February 2021, she was summoned to appear before the Zondo Commission to testify about the committee's apparent failures of oversight. She was asked in particular about her refusal to launch – as suggested by opposition politician Natasha Mazzone – a committee inquiry into the Gupta family's contracts with state-owned entities.

=== Deputy Minister of Public Service and Administration: 2017–2018 ===
Just after midnight on 31 March 2017, President Jacob Zuma announced a cabinet reshuffle which saw Letsatsi-Duba named as Deputy Minister of Public Service and Administration. She deputised newly appointed Minister Faith Muthambi. In December 2017, at the ANC's 54th National Conference, she was re-elected to the ANC National Executive Committee.

=== Minister of State Security: 2018–2019 ===
On 26 February 2018, Letsatsi-Duba was promoted to replace Bongani Bongo as Minister of State Security. She was appointed to the position by Cyril Ramaphosa, who had recently succeeded Zuma as President. According to the Mail & Guardian, though previously regarded as a political supporter of Zuma, Letsatsi-Duba had supported Ramaphosa's successful bid to be elected ANC president at the party's 54th National Conference.

After taking office, Letsatsi-Duba said that her major priority would be a "clean-up" of the State Security Agency, including a skills audit and investigations into alleged financial mismanagement. In addition, in June, Ramaphosa appointed a high-level review panel, chaired by Sydney Mufamadi, to assess the agency's mandate, capacity, and integrity. The review found that the agency had been subject to extensive dysfunction and political abuse.

==== Spying allegations ====
In May 2019, the Sunday Independent published a front-page exposé that alleged that Letsatsi-Duba had lived a "double life" as a spy for the State Security Agency. According to anonymous sources of journalists Piet Rampedi and Mzilikazi wa Afrika, Letsatsi-Duba had been an asset of the agency between 2005 and March 2017, when former State Security Minister David Mahlobo allegedly terminated her contract. In this account, she had earned millions of rands for spying on other ANC politicians; among other things, she had "infiltrated" the ANC's 2007 national conference. In conducting these activities, she had apparently relied on her directorships in several companies, notably a Polokwane-based security company called Motse Pele, which the report claimed was a front company. The article also claimed that Letsatsi-Duba had fired Arthur Fraser as head of the State Security Agency partly because he had refused to pay her money that she claimed the agency owed her. In response, Letsatsi-Duba's ministry released a terse statement stating "categorically... that Minister Letsatsi-Duba has never been a source or agent of the SSA."

==== Succession ====
Pursuant to the May 2019 general election, Letsatsi-Duba was re-elected to the National Assembly but was excluded from Ramaphosa's second-term cabinet. Ayanda Dlodlo replaced her as Minister of State Security. Several days after the cabinet announcement, on 5 June 2019, Letsatsi-Duba resigned from her parliamentary seat.

== Ambassador to Turkey: 2021–present ==
Letsatsi-Duba subsequently underwent diplomatic training as Ramaphosa's Ambassador-Designate to Turkey. In March 2020, the Sunday Times reported that her deployment was delayed because she had been denied the requisite security clearance due to undisclosed commercial and financial interests. However, she presented her credentials in Ankara, Turkey on 5 November 2021.

During her time in Ankara, at the ANC's 55th National Conference in December 2022, Letsatsi-Duba was re-elected to another five-year term as a member of the ANC National Executive Committee.

== Personal life ==
She was married to Mose Jacob Duba, a businessman from Polokwane who formerly served as a minister in the government of the Lebowa bantustan. He died of cancer in Johannesburg in August 2008.
