= Politics of Limpopo =

As a province of South Africa, Limpopo province is governed through a parliamentary system of government.

== Executive ==
The current Premier of Limpopo Province is Phophi Ramathuba who assumed office on 14 June 2024. This is the current Executive Council, as of 2019.

Portfolio	MEC
Premier	Phophi Ramathuba
Agriculture and Rural Development	Nakedi Sibanda-Kekana
Cooperative Governance, Human Settlements and Traditional Affairs	Basikopo Makamu
Economic Development, Environment and Tourism	Tshitereke Matibe
Education	Mavhungu Lerule-Ramakhanya
Health	Dieketseng Masesi Mashego
Social Development	Florence Radzilani
Provincial Treasury	Kgabo Mahoai
Public Works, Roads and Infrastructure	Sebataolo Rachoene
Transport and Community Safety	Violet Mathye
Sport, Arts and Culture	Jerry Maseko

== Legislative ==
The legislative functions of the provincial government are carried out by the Limpopo Legislature, which elects the leader of the largest party or coalition in the legislature as the premier of the province.
