= Monicca Mochadi =

South African politician

Monicca Mochadi MPL

Member of the Limpopo Provincial Legislature
- Incumbent
- Assumed office 22 May 2019

Member of the Limpopo Executive Council for Public Works, Roads and Transport
- In office 22 May 2019 – 23 March 2020
- Premier: Stan Mathabatha
- Preceded by: Nandi Ndalane
- Succeeded by: Dickson Masemola

Personal details
- Citizenship: South Africa
- Party: African National Congress

Sekutu Monicca Mochadi is a South African politician who has represented the African National Congress (ANC) in the Limpopo Provincial Legislature since 2019. She was Limpopo's Member of the Executive Council (MEC) for Public Works, Roads and Infrastructure from May 2019 to March 2020.

In June 2018, Mochadi was elected to a four-year term as a member of the Provincial Executive Committee of the ANC's Limpopo branch. The following year, she was ranked 22nd on the ANC's provincial party list in the 2019 general election and was elected to a seat in the Limpopo Provincial Legislature. She was also appointed to the Limpopo Executive Council by Stan Mathabatha, then the Premier of Limpopo, who named her MEC for Public Works, Roads and Infrastructure. In this capacity Mochadi "declared a war against potholes", launching Operation Thiba Potholes as part of a campaign to improve road infrastructure in the province.

Mochadi was fired from the Executive Council on 23 March 2020, during Mathabatha's first cabinet reshuffle of the legislative term. She remained an ordinary Member of the Provincial Legislature. However, at the next party elective conference in June 2022, she failed to gain re-election to the ANC Provincial Executive Committee.
