= Pule Shayi =

South African politician

Mayor of Mopani
- Incumbent
- Assumed office 7 June 2019
- Preceded by: Nkakareng Rakgoale

Mayor of Ba-Phalaborwa
- In office 16 August 2016 – 7 June 2019
- Succeeded by: Merriam Malatji

Personal details
- Born: 30 June 1972 (age 54) Mashishimale, Phalaborwa; Northern Transvaal, South Africa
- Party: African National Congress
- Other political affiliations: South African Communist Party
- Education: University of South Africa; Regenesys Business School

Pule Josiah Shayi (born 30 June 1972) is a South African politician who has served as the mayor of Mopani District Municipality since 2019. Before that, he was Mayor of Ba-Phalaborwa Local Municipality from 2016 to 2019. He is best known as the Regional Chairperson of the African National Congress (ANC) in the Mopani region, an office he has held since 2017.

== Early life and education ==
Shayi was born on 30 June 1972 in Mashishimale near Phalaborwa in the former Northern Transvaal. He has teaching diploma and a Bachelor of Arts in media studies from the University of South Africa. In November 2022, he completed a Master of Business Administration at Regenesys Business School. In addition, in 2015 he visited Beijing to pursue a political development programme at the Party School of the Chinese Communist Party.

== Early career ==
While earning a teaching diploma at Mapulaneng College of Education, Shayi became active in the South African Students Congress, an anti-apartheid political organisation. After graduation, he became an active member of the ANC and ANC Youth League and rose through the local and regional ranks of both. He was also a member of the South African National Civic Organisation and the South African Democratic Teachers' Union.

After the end of apartheid, Shayi worked in public administration, including in several government departments and in local government; he therefore also joined the South African Municipal Workers' Union. In the 2014 general election, he stood as a candidate for election to an ANC seat in the Limpopo Provincial Legislature; however, he was ranked 40th on the ANC's provincial party list and narrowly missed out on winning a seat.

== Mayor of Ba-Phalaborwa: 2016–2019 ==
Pursuant to the 2016 local elections, Shayi was elected Mayor of Ba-Phalaborwa Local Municipality; he was sworn in on 16 August. Just over a year into his tenure, at a regional party elective conference held in Tzaneen in September 2017, Shayi was elected Regional Chairperson of the ANC's Mopani regional branch, the largest in Limpopo. He defeated the incumbent, Seaparo Sekoati, to win the position, receiving 155 votes against Sekoati's 131. Violet Mathye was elected as his deputy and Basikopo Makamu was elected as regional secretary.

At that time, Shayi was presumed to support Nkosazana Dlamini-Zuma's campaign to win election as ANC president at the party's 54th National Conference, scheduled for December 2017 – indeed, the Sowetan reported that two Dlamini-Zuma lieutenants, Makoma Makhurupetje and Nkakareng Rakgoale, had been instrumental in engineering Shayi's victory. The outcome was therefore viewed as a serious blow to Deputy President Cyril Ramaphosa, who was running against Dlamini-Zuma for the party presidency.

== Mayor of Mopani: 2019–present ==
On 7 June 2019, Shayi was sworn in as Executive Mayor of Mopani District Municipality. His election followed a hotly contested battle among regional ANC leaders to succeed Nkakareng Rakgoale in the mayoral office after Rakgoale was appointed to the Limpopo Executive Council. Shayi was succeeded as Ba-Phalaborwa mayor by Merriam Malatji.

In June 2021, he was re-elected unopposed as regional chairperson of the ANC's Mopani branch (recently renamed after Norman Mashabane). By then, he was viewed as having changed allegiances in favour of Ramaphosa. During that year's local elections, Shayi was ranked first on the ANC's list of candidates in Mopani and he gained re-election to a full term in the mayoral office. In addition, in March 2022 he was elected to the 12-member National Executive Committee of the South African Local Government Association. He is also a member and regional leader of the South African Communist Party.

=== ANC leadership campaign ===
In early 2022, the ANC's Norman Mashabane region announced that it would back its chairperson, Shayi, for election as ANC Provincial Chairperson in Limpopo at the next provincial party elective conference in June 2022. Shayi ultimately did not stand for the chairmanship but instead became the running mate of Dickson Masemola, who sought to challenge the incumbent, Stan Mathabatha, for the chair on a slate which also included Soviet Lekganyane.

When the provincial elective conference opened in Polokwane in June 2022, Shayi was duly nominated to stand for the Deputy Provincial Chairperson position; he ran against the Mathabatha-allied candidate and incumbent, Florence Radzilani. However, when voting closed, Mathabatha and his slate of candidates won a clean sweep of the top leadership positions.
