= Rudolph Phala =

South African politician

Rudolph Phala MPL

Member of the Limpopo Provincial Legislature
- Incumbent
- Assumed office 2004

Member of the Limpopo Executive Council for Treasury
- In office 19 July 2013 – 27 May 2015
- Premier: Stan Mathabatha
- Preceded by: David Masondo
- Succeeded by: Rob Tooley

Speaker of the Limpopo Provincial Legislature
- In office May 2009 – July 2013
- Premier: Cassel Mathale
- Deputy: Mirriam Ramadwa
- Preceded by: Tshenuwani Farisani
- Succeeded by: Kwena Elias Nong

Personal details
- Born: Kgolane Alfred Phala
- Citizenship: South Africa
- Party: African National Congress
- Other political affiliations: South African Communist Party

Kgolane Alfred "Rudolph" Phala is a South African politician who has represented the African National Congress (ANC) in the Limpopo Provincial Legislature since 2004. During that time, he served as Limpopo's Member of the Executive Council (MEC) for Treasury from 2013 to 2015 and as Speaker of the Limpopo Provincial Legislature from 2009 to 2013.

== Life and career ==
Phala trained and practiced as a lawyer. During the 1980s, he was active in the anti-apartheid student movement, and he was appointed as the ANC's political education officer in the Limpopo region after the organisation was unbanned in 1990. He was also a longstanding member of the South African Communist Party. He joined the Limpopo Provincial Legislature in 2004 and chaired the legislature's Standing Committee on Public Accounts. In May 2009, shortly after his re-election to the legislature in the 2009 general election, Phala was elected to succeed Tshenuwani Farisani as Speaker of the Limpopo Provincial Legislature.

He served as Speaker until 19 July 2013, when Stan Mathabatha, the newly elected Premier of Limpopo, appointed him to the Limpopo Executive Council as MEC for Treasury. Mathabatha retained him in that position after the 2014 general election, in which Phala was re-elected to his legislative seat ranked sixth on the ANC's provincial party list. However, Mathabatha fired him on 27 May 2015. The opposition Economic Freedom Fighters claimed that Phala was removed for defying Mathabatha's instructions to award state contracts improperly. Phala remained an ordinary Member of the Provincial Legislature and he was re-elected to his seat in the 2019 general election, ranked 33rd on the ANC's party list. He was elected to the Provincial Executive Committee of the Limpopo ANC in 2018 but was not re-elected in 2022.

== Personal life ==
As of 2014, Phala was married and had four children.
