= Catherine Mabuza =

South African Politician

The Honourable Catherine Mabuza

2nd Premier of Limpopo
- In office 22 April 2004 – 26 April 2004
- Preceded by: Ngoako Ramathlodi
- Succeeded by: Sello Moloto

Personal details
- Party: African National Congress

Manana Catherine Mabuza is a South African politician and a member of the African National Congress. She was the acting Premier of Limpopo.
