= Mapula Mokaba-Phukwana =

South African politician

Mapula Mokaba-Phukwana MPL

Member of the Limpopo Provincial Legislature
- Incumbent
- Assumed office 21 May 2014

Member of the Limpopo Executive Council for Social Development
- In office October 2017 – May 2019
- Premier: Stan Mathabatha
- Preceded by: Joyce Mashamba
- Succeeded by: Nkakareng Rakgoale

Member of the Limpopo Executive Council for Agriculture and Rural Development
- In office September 2016 – October 2017
- Premier: Stan Mathabatha
- Preceded by: Joy Matshoge
- Succeeded by: Joyce Mashamba

Member of the Limpopo Executive Council for Transport, Safety and Liaison
- In office May 2014 – September 2016
- Premier: Stan Mathabatha
- Preceded by: Lehlogonolo Masoga (for Roads and Transport); Joyce Mashamba (for Safety and Security)
- Succeeded by: Nandi Ndalane

Personal details
- Born: Mapula Annah Mokaba
- Citizenship: South Africa
- Party: African National Congress
- Spouse: Zwelakhe Phukwana
- Relations: Peter Mokaba (brother)

Mapula Annah Mokaba-Phukwana (née Mokaba) is a South African politician who has represented the African National Congress (ANC) in the Limpopo Provincial Legislature since 2014. She formerly served as a Member of the Executive Council (MEC) in Limpopo from 2014 to 2019, during the first full term of Premier Stan Mathabatha. She was MEC for Social Development from 2017 to 2019, MEC for Agriculture and Rural Development from 2016 to 2017, and MEC for Transport, Safety and Liaison from 2014 to 2016. She was also elected to four-year terms on the Limpopo ANC's Provincial Executive Committee in 2018 and 2022.

== Career in provincial government ==
In the 2014 general election, Mokaba-Phukwana was elected to the Limpopo Provincial Legislature, ranked 16th on the ANC's provincial party list. She was appointed to the Limpopo Executive Council by Premier Mathabatha, who made her MEC for Transport, Safety and Liaison. While she was in this portfolio, in 2015, the opposition Economic Freedom Fighters lodged a formal complaint against her with the Public Protector, Thuli Madonsela, alleging that she had been involved in procurement irregularities. The Public Protector published the report of her investigation in March 2017 and found that Mokaba-Phukwana had exceeded her legal powers by personally awarding a state forensics contract in 2014. She dismissed Mokaba-Phukwana's argument that she had been obliged to award the contract because many senior department officials – who did have the legal authority to award contracts – were implicated in corruption, and she concluded that Mokaba-Phukwana's action "amounts to abuse of public authority".

By the time of the report's publication, Mokaba-Phukwana had become MEC for Agriculture and Rural Development, a position to which she was appointed in a September 2016 reshuffle by Mathabatha. She held that office until October 2017, when, in a further reshuffle, Mathabatha moved her to the Social Development portfolio. The move was viewed as a demotion and City Press suggested that it was linked to Mokaba-Phukwana's support for incumbent ANC President Jacob Zuma against Mathabatha's ally Cyril Ramaphosa.

At a party elective conference in June 2018, Mokaba-Phukwana was elected to a four-year term on the Provincial Executive Committee of the ANC's Limpopo branch. She was also re-elected to her legislative seat in the 2019 general election, ranked 16th on the ANC's party list. However, in the aftermath of the election, Mathabatha dropped Mokaba-Phukwana from his second-term Executive Council. She remained an ordinary Member of the Provincial Legislature and was re-elected to the ANC Provincial Executive Committee in June 2022.

== Personal life ==
Mokaba-Phukwana is the sister of ANC stalwart Peter Mokaba, who died in 2002; their mother, Priscilla, died in 2013. She is married to Zwelakhe Phukwana, a public servant.
