= Onicca Moloi =

South African politician (born 1979/1980)

Member of the Limpopo Provincial Legislature
- In office 21 May 2014 – 7 May 2019

Member of the Limpopo Executive Council for Sports, Arts and Culture
- In office 15 September 2016 – 3 July 2018
- Premier: Stan Mathabatha
- Preceded by: Nandi Ndalane
- Succeeded by: Thandi Moraka

Personal details
- Born: 1979 or 1980 (age 46–47)
- Party: African National Congress

Mmaneo Onicca Moloi (born 1979/1980) is a South African politician and businesswoman who represented the African National Congress (ANC) in the Limpopo Provincial Legislature from 2014 to 2019. She was also Limpopo's Member of the Executive Council (MEC) for Sports, Arts and Culture from September 2016 until July 2018, when she made a forthright Facebook post and resigned. A trained chef, she rose to political prominence through the Limpopo branch of the ANC Youth League.

== Education and early career ==
Moloi was born in 1979 or 1980 and has an undergraduate degree in political science. She became politically active as a member of the South African Students Congress (SASCO) and was Provincial Treasurer of SASCO's Limpopo branch from 2001 to 2002. She was first elected to the Provincial Executive Committee of the ANCYL in Limpopo in 2003. In the same year, she began work as a researcher in the Office of the ANC Chief Whip in the Limpopo Provincial Legislature. She also worked as a professional chef.

== Career in provincial government ==
In the 2014 general election, she was elected to the provincial legislature, ranked 19th on the ANC's provincial party list. She was viewed as a possible candidate for election as Provincial Chairperson of the ANCYL in Limpopo, but she ultimately did not seek election to that position. On 15 September 2016, Stan Mathabatha, then the Premier of Limpopo, announced a reshuffle of the Limpopo Executive Council in which Moloi was appointed MEC for Sports, Arts and Culture. According to Moloi, she was Limpopo's youngest MEC at that time. During her tenure in the office, Moloi clashed with fellow ANCYL activist Che Selane, who accused Moloi of allowing her department to award a state contract to a company owned by her husband; Moloi said that the allegation was defamatory and threatened to sue Selane.

At a party elective conference in June 2018, Moloi campaigned to succeed Basikopo Makamu as Deputy Provincial Secretary of the Limpopo ANC. However, she was defeated by Makamu and, at the same conference, failed to gain election to the ANC's Provincial Executive Committee; the Zoutpansberger reported that Moloi, after losing the Deputy Provincial Secretary contest, had declined her nomination to run for election to the committee. Shortly after the elective conference, on 2 July 2018, Moloi made a controversial post on Facebook, addressed to the "Masana bishops" in what eNCA reported was an allusion to a lodge frequented by provincial party leaders. The post read:

Dear Masana bishops... Don't worry, we will send our resignation letters and hand over your so-called 'blue lights' [VIP protection motorcade] by Friday to make your job easy. We didn't join the ANC for blue lights... yours Onicca Moloi.

In a subsequent comment, Moloi wrote:

He he he... Thina [us/we] we know our sins. We refused to be summoned to late meetings. We refused to be told what to write on Facebook, who to greet, which party to go to and what should be our views on the regional politics of Peter Mokaba [party branch in Capricorn District].

ANC Provincial Secretary Soviet Lekganyane condemned the posts, saying they amounted to Moloi "throwing a gobble of mucus at the ANC". Her posts were construed as an informal resignation, and the following day Premier Mathabatha confirmed that he had accepted Moloi's resignation, effective immediately. Later in July, Thandi Moraka replaced her as MEC. Moloi said that she would remain an ordinary Member of the Provincial Legislature and a member of the ANC but wished to focus on her postgraduate education and her career as a chef. She vacated her legislative seat in the 2019 general election, when she stood for election to the national Parliament. However, she was ranked 184th on the ANC's party list and did not secure election to a seat. As of 2021, she was working as a chef and nutritionist.

== Personal life ==
Moloi has three children, two sons and one daughter. She had her first child at age 17. In 2007, she married Kabelo Moloi.
