= Basikopo Makamu =

South African politician (born 1973)

Basikopo Makamu MPL

Member of the Limpopo Executive Council for Cooperative Governance, Human Settlements and Traditional Affairs
- Incumbent
- Assumed office May 2019
- Premier: Phophi Ramathuba; Stan Mathabatha
- Preceded by: Jerry Ndou

Member of the Limpopo Executive Council for Agriculture and Rural Development
- In office May 2019 – 26 July 2018
- Premier: Stan Mathabatha
- Preceded by: Joyce Mashamba
- Succeeded by: Nandi Ndalane

Deputy Provincial Secretary of the African National Congress in Limpopo
- Incumbent
- Assumed office June 2018
- Chairperson: Stan Mathabatha
- Secretary: Soviet Lekganyane; Reuben Madadzhe
- Preceded by: Makoma Makhurupetje

Personal details
- Born: 2 November 1973 (age 52) Giyani, Transvaal; South Africa
- Party: African National Congress

Rodgers Basikopo Makamu (born 2 November 1973) is a South African politician who is currently serving as Member of the Executive Council (MEC) for Cooperative Governance, Human Settlements and Traditional Affairs in the Limpopo provincial government. He was formerly MEC for Agriculture and Rural Development between 2018 and 2019. A teacher by training and a member of the African National Congress (ANC), Makamu was elected to a second term as Deputy Provincial Secretary of the ANC's Limpopo branch in June 2022.

== Early life and career ==
Makamu was born in Giyani in Mopani in present-day Limpopo and matriculated at Matsambu High School in Mopani in 1994, the year that apartheid ended. He trained as an accounting teacher but later resigned from the education sector to work in local government, becoming an accountant and then a manager at the Greater Giyani Local Municipality. He was also a member of the African National Congress (ANC), initially through the party's Youth League. He resigned from his municipal job when he was elected to the full-time party position of Regional Secretary of the ANC's branch in Mopani. He was Regional Secretary under Regional Chairperson Seaparo Sekwati and then, after his re-election in September 2017, under Sekwati's successor, Pule Shayi.

== Career in provincial government ==
In June 2018, Makamu vacated the regional party office when he was elected to a more senior position as Deputy Provincial Secretary of the ANC's Limpopo branch. He won in a vote against Onicca Moloi. As deputy secretary, he worked under ANC Provincial Chairperson Stan Mathabatha and ANC Provincial Secretary Soviet Lekganyane. Shortly after his election to the party office, on 26 July 2018, he joined the Limpopo Executive Council: Mathabatha, in his capacity as Premier of Limpopo, appointed Makamu to succeed the late Joyce Mashamba as Member of the Executive Council (MEC) for Agriculture and Rural Development.

In the 2019 general election, Makamu was elected to his first full term as a Member of the Limpopo Provincial Legislature, ranked second on the ANC's party list. He was appointed MEC for Cooperative Governance, Human Settlements and Traditional Affairs in Mathabatha's newly constituted Executive Council. He was also re-elected to his position as ANC Deputy Provincial Secretary at the party's next provincial elective conference in Polokwane in June 2022; he ran on a slate aligned to Mathabatha, who won re-election as ANC Provincial Chairperson at the same conference, and thereafter he deputised Reuben Madadzhe, who succeeded Soviet Lekganyane as Provincial Secretary.

Following the 2024 general election, Makamu remained as the MEC for Cooperative Governance, Human Settlements and Traditional Affairs in the executive council led by the newly elected premier Phophi Ramathuba.
