= Thabitha Mohlala =

South African politician

Member of the Limpopo Executive Council for Public Works
- In office 28 January 2011 – 19 July 2013
- Premier: Cassel Mathale
- Preceded by: George Phadagi
- Succeeded by: Dickson Masemola

Personal details
- Citizenship: South Africa
- Party: African National Congress

Thabitha Mohlala is a South African politician and public servant who represented the African National Congress (ANC) in the Limpopo Provincial Legislature until 2014. She served as Limpopo's Member of the Executive Council (MEC) for Public Works under Premier Cassel Mathale from January 2011 until July 2013.

== Political career ==
Mohlala was not initially elected to the Limpopo Provincial Legislature in the 2009 general election but was sworn in during the legislative term. On 28 January 2011, Premier Cassel Mathale announced that she would join the Limpopo Executive Council as MEC for Public Works; she succeeded George Phadagi in that office. She remained in the public works portfolio only until July 2013, when Mathale was succeeded as Premier by Stan Mathabatha. When Mathabatha announced his Executive Council on 19 July, he fired eight of Mathale's ten MECs, Mohlala among them.

She served the remainder of the legislative term as an ordinary Member of the Provincial Legislature, but in the 2014 general election she was ranked 47th on the ANC's provincial party list and did not secure re-election to her seat. She stood again in the next general election in 2019, on that occasion seeking election to the National Assembly, but she was again ranked too low on the party list to gain a seat.

== Personal life ==
Mohlala married businessman Shadi Mabasa in August 2012.
