= Pitsi Moloto =

South African politician

Member of the Limpopo Executive Council for Roads and Transport
- In office 13 March 2012 – 19 July 2013
- Premier: Cassel Mathale
- Preceded by: Pinky Kekana
- Succeeded by: Lehlogonolo Masoga

Member of the Limpopo Executive Council for Economic Development, Environmental Affairs and Tourism
- In office 6 May 2009 – 13 March 2012
- Premier: Cassel Mathale
- Preceded by: Collins Chabane
- Succeeded by: Pinky Kekana

Personal details
- Citizenship: South Africa
- Party: African National Congress

Pitsi Paul Moloto is a South African politician and businessman who served in the Limpopo Executive Council from May 2009 to July 2013. Under Premier Cassel Mathale, he served as Limpopo's Member of the Executive Council (MEC) for Economic Development, Environmental Affairs, and Tourism from 2009 to 2012 and as MEC for Roads and Transport from 2012 to 2013. He represented the African National Congress in the Limpopo Provincial Legislature but did not seek re-election in the 2014 general election.

== Political career ==
Moloto was elected to the Limpopo Provincial Legislature in the 2009 general election, ranked 13th on the ANC's provincial party list. After the election, on 6 May 2009, newly elected Premier Cassel Mathale announced that Moloto would join his Executive Council as MEC for Economic Development, Environmental Affairs, and Tourism. He succeeded Collins Chabane, who had been sworn into the National Assembly.

Moloto remained in that position until 13 March 2012, when Mathale announced a cabinet reshuffle in which Moloto swapped positions with Pinky Kekana, becoming MEC for Roads and Transport. The opposition Democratic Alliance said that it was not confident that Moloto possessed the "political gravitas" to turn the department's performance around. Moloto held the Roads and Transport portfolio for less than two years: in July 2013, Mathale was replaced by Premier Stan Mathabatha, who fired Moloto and seven other MECs. Moloto served the remainder of the legislative term as an ordinary Member of the Provincial Legislature but did not seek re-election in the 2014 general election.
