= David Mahlobo =

South African politician (born 1972)

The Honourable David Mahlobo MP
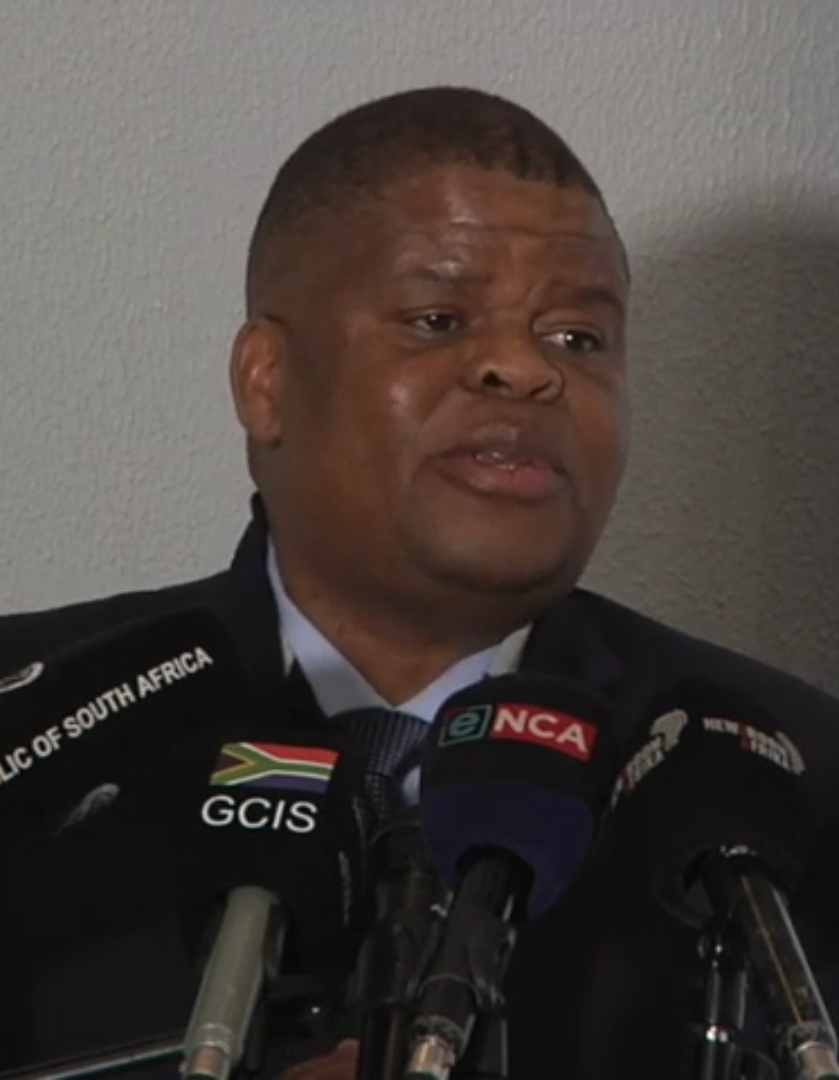
- Mahlobo in 2024

Deputy Minister of Water and Sanitation
- Incumbent
- Assumed office 5 August 2021 Serving with Dikeledi Magadzi (2021–2024) and Sello Seitlholo (since 2024)
- President: Cyril Ramaphosa
- Minister: Senzo Mchunu; Pemmy Majodina
- Preceded by: Himself

Deputy Minister of Human Settlements, Water and Sanitation
- In office 29 May 2019 – 5 August 2021 Serving with Pam Tshwete
- President: Cyril Ramaphosa
- Minister: Lindiwe Sisulu
- Preceded by: Pam Tshwete (for Water and Sanitation)
- Succeeded by: Himself (for Water and Sanitation)

Minister of Energy
- In office 17 October 2017 – 26 February 2018
- President: Jacob Zuma
- Deputy: Thembi Majola
- Preceded by: Mmamoloko Kubayi
- Succeeded by: Jeff Radebe

Minister of State Security
- In office 25 May 2014 – 17 October 2017
- President: Jacob Zuma
- Deputy: Ellen Molekane
- Preceded by: Siyabonga Cwele
- Succeeded by: Bongani Bongo

Member of the National Assembly
- Incumbent
- Assumed office 21 May 2014

Personal details
- Born: Mbangiseni David Mahlobo; 14 January 1972 (age 54) Piet Retief, Transvaal, South Africa
- Party: African National Congress
- Parent: Mandlenkosi Mahlobo (father)
- Education: University of Zululand

Mbangiseni David Mahlobo (born 14 January 1972) is a South African politician who has served as the Deputy Minister of Water and Sanitation since August 2021. He has been responsible for the water and sanitation portfolio since May 2019, initially as Deputy Minister of Human Settlements, Water and Sanitation. A member of the National Assembly since May 2014, he was formerly the Minister of State Security from May 2014 to October 2017 and the Minister of Energy from October 2017 to February 2018.

Although he was born in Mpumalanga, Mahlobo was primarily educated in KwaZulu-Natal, where he rose to political prominence as a student activist in the early post-apartheid period. Between 2000 and 2014, he worked in the civil service; a scientist by training, he began his career in the water quality unit of the Mpumalanga provincial government before a stint in the national Department of Water Affairs and Forestry and a stint, between 2009 and 2014, as head of department of the Mpumalanga Department of Cooperative Governance and Traditional Affairs. In the latter capacity, he became reputed as an ally of Mpumalanga Premier David Mabuza, whom some credited for subsequent Mahlobo's political rise.

After his election to the ANC National Executive Committee in December 2012, Mahlobo was appointed to President Jacob Zuma's second cabinet. Infamous for his personal intimacy with Zuma, Mahlobo was a controversial member of the cabinet; the Zondo Commission later implicated him in the capture of the State Security Agency as State Security Minister, and he was known as Energy Minister for his support for the proposed Russian nuclear deal.

After Zuma was deposed in February 2018, Mahlobo was sacked from the cabinet by newly elected President Cyril Ramaphosa, but he returned to the national executive as a deputy minister after the 2019 general election. He was re-elected to his third consecutive term in the ANC National Executive Committee in December 2022, and he was elected to a five-year term in the ANC National Working Committee in January 2023.

== Early life and career ==
Mahlobo was born on 14 January 1972 on Bergplaas farm in KwaNdalaza near Piet Retief in the former Eastern Transvaal, now part of Mpumalanga Province. His father is Chief Mandlenkosi Mahlobo, a KwaNdwalaza traditional leader with land in the region straddling the Mpumalanga–KwaZulu-Natal border, who was subject to persecution and forced removal by the apartheid government. Between 1981 and 1983, Mahlobo and his siblings left their schooling and parents to live with relatives in exile in Swaziland. Upon his return to South Africa, he attended Bambanani High School in Belgrade, KwaZulu-Natal, matriculating in 1991.

Mahlobo went on to the University of Zululand, where he completed a Bachelor of Science in microbiology and biochemistry in 1998 and an Honours in biochemistry in 1999. Active in student politics since high school, he served two terms as secretary of the university's students' representative council, in which capacity he was particularly involved in establishing the university's branch of the National Education, Health and Allied Workers' Union. He was provincial chairperson of the KwaZulu-Natal branch of the South African Union of Student Representative Councils and the deputy provincial chairperson of the KwaZulu-Natal branch of the South African Students Congress.

At the same time, he was active in the African National Congress (ANC) and ANC Youth League; according to his official profile, he organised for the ANC in his rural hometown region, around Piet Retief and Pongola, and on the North Coast of KwaZulu-Natal. He also taught physical science and biology to high school students at his own high school, Bambanani, and later at the Lalela Finishing School in Pongola.

== Civil service: 2000–2014 ==
In 2000, Mahlobo joined the civil service as a water scientist in the water quality division of the Mpumalanga Government's Department of Water and Forestry, focusing on the Olifants River catchment area. From 2002 to 2006, he worked in the transformation unit of the national Department of Water Affairs and Forestry, first as an assistant director in the unit, then as deputy director and director. Thereafter, between 2009 and 2014, he returned to the Mpumalanga Government as Head of Department in the Department of Cooperative Governance and Traditional Affairs. In this capacity, he became known for acting as a "fixer" for the Premier of Mpumalanga, David Mabuza. Critics pointed to the fact that Mahlobo had an official security detail as evidence of his involvement in political intrigue. Opposition politician Collen Sedibe, who worked in Mahlobo's department, later alleged that he had used his position to organize patronage for Mabuza among the province's municipal managers.

During his time as a Head of Department, Mahlobo rose in the ranks of the ANC. He was elected as deputy chairperson of the party's local branch in Nelsville, Mbombela in 2010 and as deputy chairperson of its regional branch in Ehlanzeni in 2012. Shortly thereafter, at the ANC's 53rd National Conference in Mangaung in December 2012, he was elected to a five-year term as a member of the ANC's National Executive Committee. By number of votes received, he was ranked 67th of the 80 ordinary members elected to the committee. Observers attributed his sudden political ascent to his closeness to Mabuza or to his longstanding relationship with President Jacob Zuma, whom he had met as a student activist in KwaZulu-Natal. He was an active member of the National Executive Committee in the two years after his election; his responsibilities included liaising with the task team that led the ANC Youth League in the aftermath of Julius Malema's expulsion. He also participated in an ANC political education tour in China.

== National government: 2014–present ==
=== Minister of State Security ===
Ahead of the May 2014 general election, Mahlobo left the civil service to stand as a candidate for election to the South African Parliament, ranked 67th on the ANC's national party list. He was elected to a seat in the National Assembly and appointed as Minister of State Security in Zuma's cabinet. Observers again expressed surprise about his abrupt elevation. The Mail & Guardian argued that Mahlobo was "an easy target for manipulation" because of his "youth and ignorance of spycraft", as well as his "lack of a serious constituency in the ANC". Yet Mahlobo quickly became renowned for his intimate relationship with Zuma. In March 2015, he was co-opted onto the National Working Committee, the ANC's 20-member governing organ; he and Sisi Ntombela were selected to replace Collins Chabane and Sisi Mabe, who had died. And by September 2017, Ferial Haffajee reported that Mahlobo had become so close to Zuma – even accompanying him on international trips – as to be "his confidante and right-hand man" and even his "de facto prime minister".

During his three years in the state security portfolio, Mahlobo fired several senior officials from the State Security Agency (SSA). A high-level review panel, commissioned in 2018 after Mahlobo's departure from the portfolio, found that under Mahlobo the SSA had been a site of rentseeking. Indeed, in subsequent years, the Zondo Commission heard evidence that Mahlobo had personally been involved in a plot to funnel cash to Zuma and his associates through the SSA. Although Mahlobo denied these allegations, the Zondo Commission's final report concluded that Mahlobo "did indeed involve himself in operational matters at the SSA, and further that large amounts of cash were delivered to him on several occasions"; it recommended that Mahlobo should be subject to criminal investigation.

=== Minister of Energy ===
In a cabinet reshuffle on 17 October 2017, President Zuma appointed Mahlobo to replace Mmamoloko Kubayi as Minister of Energy. The appointment was widely regarded as linked to Zuma's efforts to push through a proposed nuclear procurement deal with Russia. Describing Mahlobo as "a hyper-Zuma loyalist", Steven Friedman told Al Jazeera that, "It seems he has been moved into this position to push through the nuclear deal." Jay Naidoo made similar allegations in the Daily Maverick in December.

In December 2017, the ANC's 54th National Conference re-elected Mahlobo to the ANC National Executive Committee; by number of votes received, he was ranked 44th of the 80 ordinary members elected. However, he was not re-elected to the party's National Working Committee. Moreover, the conference elected Cyril Ramaphosa to replace Zuma as party president, and in February 2018 Ramaphosa assumed the South African presidency. Announcing his new cabinet on 26 February, Ramaphosa sacked Mahlobo, appointing Jeff Radebe to replace him as Minister of Energy; the move was part of a broader displacement of Zuma's political allies. Mahlobo remained an ordinary Member of Parliament, serving in the Portfolio Committee on Trade, Industry and Competition.

=== Deputy Minister of Water and Sanitation ===
Mahlobo was elected to a third term in the National Assembly in the May 2019 general election, now ranked 28th on the ANC's party list. Appointing his second cabinet, Ramaphosa returned Mahlobo to the executive as one of two deputy ministers under the Minister of Human Settlements, Water and Sanitation, Lindiwe Sisulu; Mahlobo was given responsibility for water and sanitation, while Pam Tshwete was responsible for human settlements. In a reshuffle announced on 5 August 2021, Ramaphosa formally bifurcated the ministry and Mahlobo was named Deputy Minister of Water and Sanitation; Senzo Mchunu was appointed as minister and Dikeledi Magadzi was appointed as second deputy minister in the same portfolio.

While serving in this office, at the ANC's 55th National Conference in December 2022, Mahlobo was elected to a third consecutive term in the ANC National Executive Committee. By number of votes received, he was ranked 23rd among the 80 candidates elected. At the new committee's first meeting in February 2023, he was appointed as the committee's chief representative in Limpopo. He was also reappointed to the National Working Committee; he was the seventh-most popular candidate, receiving the support of 53 of the National Executive's 80 members.

After the May 2024 general election, Ramaphosa announced his third cabinet, retaining Mahlobo as Deputy Minister of Water and Sanitation; Pemmy Majodina was appointed to succeed Mchunu as minister and Sello Seitlholo became second deputy minister.

== Rhino smuggling allegations ==
In November 2016, the Hawks said that they were investigating Mahlobo for alleged connections to a Chinese syndicate involved in rhino poaching. The allegations originated in an Al Jazeera investigation, published in the 2016 documentary The Poachers Pipeline; in an interview for the documentary, a self-confessed rhino horn smuggler named Guan Jiang Guang claimed that he was close to Mahlobo and did business with his wife. Mahlobo denied the allegations, saying that he frequently visited a massage parlor in Mbombela owned by Guan but had no knowledge of Guan's illicit activities.

== Personal life ==
Mahlobo was a longstanding member of the council of his alma mater, the University of Zululand. His wife, Nompumelelo, formerly worked as a civil servant in the Mbombela Local Municipality.
