= Sello Moloto =

Premier of Limpopo from 2004 to 2009

2nd Premier of Limpopo
- In office 26 April 2004 – 2 March 2009
- President: Thabo Mbeki
- Preceded by: Ngoako Ramathlodi
- Succeeded by: Cassel Mathale

Provincial Chairperson of the African National Congress in Limpopo
- In office June 2005 – July 2008
- Deputy: Joyce Mashamba
- Preceded by: Ngoako Ramatlhodi
- Succeeded by: Cassel Mathale

Member of the Limpopo Executive Council for Health and Welfare
- In office June 1999 – April 2004
- Premier: Ngoako Ramatlhodi
- Succeeded by: Seaparo Sekoati
Legislative seats 1994–2011
Member of the Limpopo Provincial Legislature
In office May 2009 – April 2011
In office June 1999 – March 2009
Member of the Senate
In office 1994–1996
Constituency	Northern Transvaal

Personal details
- Born: Phaswana Cleopus Sello Moloto; 27 August 1964 (age 62) Claremont, Transvaal; South Africa
- Party: Congress of the People (2009–2011); African National Congress (until 2009)
- Other political affiliations: South African Communist Party
- Spouse: Ramokone Moloto (died 2009)
- Education: University of the North

Phaswana Cleopus Sello Moloto (born 27 August 1964) is a South African politician and diplomat from Limpopo. He was the second Premier of Limpopo from April 2004 until March 2009. He resigned after defecting from the African National Congress (ANC) to the Congress of the People (COPE).

A pharmacist by training, Moloto entered politics through the anti-apartheid movement. After a brief stint representing the ANC in the Senate from 1994 to 1996, he joined Premier Ngoako Ramatlhodi's Executive Council as Member of the Executive Council for Health and Welfare from 1999 to 2004. During this period, he was also the Provincial Chairperson of the South African Communist Party from 2001 to 2004. He succeeded Moloto as Premier after the 2004 general election.

However, during the latter half of his term, Moloto faced sustained political pressure from Cassel Mathale, Julius Malema, and other provincial politicians who supported Jacob Zuma's bid to succeed Thabo Mbeki as ANC President. Moloto served only one term as ANC Provincial Chairperson, from 2005 to 2008, before Mathale unseated him from that office. His resignation from the premiership and from the ANC was announced on 3 March 2009.

Moloto subsequently served as COPE's candidate for Premier of Limpopo during the 2009 general election. Though not elected as Premier, he returned to the Limpopo Provincial Legislature on the opposition benches as Leader of the Opposition. In April 2011, he resigned again, leaving COPE in order to accept appointment as an ambassador.

== Early life and education ==
Sello was born on 27 August 1964 in Claremont, a village near Bakenberg in the former Northern Transvaal. He came from a poor rural family and started primary school late, but he matriculated at Bakenberg High School (now Lephadimisha Secondary) and entered the University of the North in 1985. He graduated with a Bachelor's degree in pharmacy.

== Early political career ==
Moloto became politically active at university and in 1989 he served as president of the local branch of the South African National Student Congress. During the same period, he was active in underground cells of the South African Communist Party, which at the time was banned by the apartheid government.

In the early 1990s, Moloto worked as a pharmacist in the rural Northern Transvaal, first at Groothoek Hospital in Lepelle-Nkumpi and then, from 1992, at Mokopane Hospital in Mahwelereng. At the same time, the SACP had been unbanned in 1990 to facilitate negotiations to end apartheid, and Moloto helped rebuild the party's legal structures in the region. He also joined the African National Congress (ANC) and became chairman of a regional ANC branch in Waterberg.

== Career in government ==
=== Senate: 1994–1996 ===
In South Africa's first post-apartheid elections in 1994, Moloto was elected to an ANC seat in the Senate of South Africa, where he represented Limpopo Province (then still called the Northern Transvaal). He served in his seat until 1996, when the ANC transferred him back to Limpopo to serve as chief executive officer of the conservative Bushveld District Council, until then a predominantly white administration.

=== Executive Council: 1999–2004 ===
In the 1999 general election, Moloto was elected to a seat in the Limpopo Provincial Legislature. He was also appointed to the Executive Council of Premier Ngoako Ramatlhodi, who named him as Limpopo's Member of the Executive Council for Health and Welfare. According to the Mail & Guardian, Ramatlhodi was his political mentor.

During the legislative term, Moloto rose through the ranks of the Tripartite Alliance in the province. In 2001, he was elected as the SACP's Provincial Chairperson in Limpopo, a position which he held until 2004. The following year, he was elected as Deputy Provincial Secretary of the ANC, deputising Cassel Mathale and serving under Provincial Chairperson Ramatlhodi. Later that year, ahead of the ANC's 51st National Conference, he was nominated to stand for election to the ANC National Executive Committee, though he was not ultimately elected.

=== Premier of Limpopo: 2004–2009 ===
In the next general election in 2004, Moloto was re-elected to the Limpopo Provincial Legislature. Although Ramatlhodi's term as Premier of Limpopo had expired, and although Moloto was ranked first on the ANC's party list in the election, he was not viewed as the frontrunner to succeed Ramatlhodi – Joyce Mabudafhasi was viewed as the likely candidate, or perhaps John Nkadimeng. However, on 21 April, the ANC announced that it would nominate Moloto to serve as Premier. He was sworn in on 26 April. His administration emphasised continuity: he retained eight of ten of Ramatlhodi's provincial ministers and a similar economic policy.

==== Election as ANC chairperson ====
In June 2005, the Limpopo ANC's fifth elective congress was held in Turfloop at Moloto's alma mater, by then renamed the University of Limpopo. Moloto did not stand for re-election as Deputy Provincial Secretary but instead won election unopposed as Provincial Chairperson. Joyce Mashamba was elected as his deputy, and Cassel Mathale was retained as Provincial Secretary.

==== Mounting opposition ====
By the middle of his term as Premier, Moloto was increasingly politically embattled, particularly as a perceived ally of President Thabo Mbeki. Several influential political groupings in the Limpopo ANC were becoming vocal supporters of Mbeki's rival, ANC Deputy President Jacob Zuma. Reports suggested that Moloto's influence in the ANC did not match his influence in government. In December 2006, the provincial ANC Youth League lambasted Moloto for having said that Zuma's criminal charges were personal problems and did not call for the support of ANC structures. The league accused Moloto of having an anti-Zuma "political agenda". In October 2007, when Moloto took the podium at Norman Mashabane's funeral, he was heckled, reportedly by a group of ANC Youth League members. The heckling continued until Zuma himself intervened, and the ANC later issued a statement condemning the hecklers' "despicable conduct".

The situation worsened after the ANC's 52nd National Conference, held in Polokwane in December 2007. Under Moloto's leadership, Limpopo was one of four provincial branches that supported Mbeki's bid for a third term as ANC President. However, Zuma ousted Mbeki from the presidency, and Moloto himself failed to gain election to the National Executive Committee. The outcome of the conference was viewed as having rendered Moloto's political position – and premiership – highly precarious. In early 2008, he came under pressure – mostly from the Limpopo branch of the ANC Youth League – to resign from the premiership and ANC chairmanship. ANC Youth League Provincial Secretary Julius Malema said that if Moloto did not resign of his own accord, "we will get the branches to take him out". In response, Moloto said, "I’m doing my job. I will step down only if the people I am serving say my contribution is no longer needed." He dismissed the protests of the ANC Youth League, saying, "Ever since I was elected the youth league never wanted me. All they say has never meant anything to me".

Moloto's term as ANC Provincial Chairperson expired at the party's provincial conference in Thohoyandou in July 2008, and his bid for re-election was hotly contested. The run-up to the conference was marked by incidents of political violence, leading to several arrests. The week before the conference, the Mail & Guardian reported that Moloto appeared to be in the lead, having outperformed his challenger – outgoing Provincial Secretary Mathale, backed by the ANC Youth League – during the nominations stage. However, at the conference, Mathale beat Moloto comfortably, receiving 587 votes to Moloto's 357. Pro-Zuma candidates were also elected to the other top leadership positions.

After Moloto lost the ANC chairmanship, and amid sustained political pressure, he was frequently linked to the Congress of the People (COPE), an ANC breakaway party that had been formed after the Polokwane conference by Sam Shilowa, Mosiuoa Lekota, and other pro-Mbeki ANC members.

==== Defection to COPE ====
On 3 March 2009, the ANC announced that Moloto had resigned from the premiership and provincial legislature. The party said that it "wishe[d] him good luck in his new endeavour". Newspapers immediately reported that Moloto had agreed to stand as COPE's candidate for Premier in the 2009 general election. COPE's elections chief, Mlungisi Hlongwane, said the same. However, Moloto refused to confirm the rumours, saying that his resignation was not effective until his successor was elected and that "If I confirm that, it will mean that COPE has a premier in South Africa. [Yet] COPE has never contested any elections".

Later on 3 March, the Limpopo Executive Council convened and appointed Mathale to replace Moloto as acting Premier. It was subsequently confirmed that Moloto had left the ANC to join COPE and that he would stand as the new party's Premier candidate in the upcoming elections.

=== Return to the Provincial Legislature: 2009–2011 ===
In the 2009 general election, COPE became the official opposition in the Limpopo Provincial Legislature, winning four seats, but it did not come close to unseating the ANC from the provincial government. It was initially reported that, with the premiership out of reach, Moloto would decline to serve in the provincial legislature and would instead be sent to COPE's caucus in the national Parliament; according to these reports, becoming an ordinary Member of the Provincial Legislature would be perceived as a demotion for a former premier. However, he was sworn in to the provincial legislature, where he served as Leader of the Opposition. During this period, he also served as Provincial Chairperson of COPE's Limpopo branch.

In April 2011, COPE announced that Moloto had resigned from the party and therefore from his legislative seat. It was rumoured that he had lost interest in the party due to the ongoing factional battles between its co-founders, Lekota and Shilowa. His COPE deputy, Solly Mkhatshwa, succeeded him as the party's acting Provincial Chairperson.

== Diplomatic career ==
Although COPE initially suggested that Moloto was leaving the party to rejoin the ANC, he did not do so. Instead, announcing his resignation from COPE, he also announced his exit from frontline politics and his decision to accept appointment as South African High Commissioner to Mozambique. City Press reported that he had been offered the post in a deal brokered by ANC Deputy President Kgalema Motlanthe after over a year of secret talks.

Moloto presented his credentials as ambassador in Maputo in September 2011. He later served as Ambassador to Finland, High Commissioner to Lesotho, and, most recently, Ambassador to Switzerland.

== Personal life ==
Moloto is Christian. He was married to Ramokone Moloto, who was a teacher by profession; they had three daughters. She was diagnosed with liver cancer in 2006 and died on 24 July 2009.
