= Seaparo Sekoati =

South African politician (born 1968)

Seaparo Sekoati MP

Member of the National Assembly of South Africa
- Incumbent
- Assumed office 14 June 2024

Member of the Limpopo Executive Council for Finance
- In office 22 May 2019 – 28 May 2024
- Premier: Stan Mathabatha
- Preceded by: Rob Tooley
- Succeeded by: Kgabo Mahoai

Member of the Limpopo Executive Council for Economic Development, Environment and Tourism
- In office July 2013 – May 2019
- Premier: Stan Mathabatha
- Preceded by: Pinky Kekana
- Succeeded by: Thabo Mokone

Member of the Limpopo Provincial Legislature
- In office 2004–2024

Personal details
- Born: 28 June 1967 (age 59) Sekhukhuneland, Northern Transvaal; South Africa
- Party: African National Congress
- Education: University of Limpopo

Seaparo Charles Sekoati (born 28 June 1967), sometimes misspelled Seaparo Sekwati, is a South African politician who has been a Member of the National Assembly of South Africa since 2024. He was a Member of the Limpopo Provincial Legislature from 2004 until 2024 and served in the Limpopo provincial government as the Member of the Executive Council (MEC) for Health and Social Development from 2004 to 2009 and, before serving as the MEC for Finance from 2019 until 2024, MEC for Economic Development, Environment and Tourism from 2013 to 2019. From 2013 to 2017, he was also Regional Chairperson of the Mopani branch of his political party, the African National Congress.

== Early life and education ==
Sekoati was born on 28 June 1967 in Sekhukhuneland and grew up in Mopani, now part of Limpopo province. He matriculated at Vuxeni High School in 1988. He later earned a Bachelor's degree in social science from the University of the North in 1993 and a Master's degree in development from the University of Limpopo in 2011; he also earned a tertiary diploma at the University of Zambia in 1996.

During apartheid, he was active in the South African Youth Congress, the South African Students Congress, the Congress of South African Students, and the United Democratic Front. After the African National Congress (ANC) was unbanned in 1990, he became involved in the ANC Youth League's new branch in Limpopo, ultimately becoming its Deputy Provincial Chairperson. Later, from 2003 to 2008, he was a member of the Provincial Executive Committee of the mainstream ANC's Limpopo branch.

== Career in government ==
=== Health MEC: 2004–2009 ===
Sekoati served on the Limpopo Executive Council from 2004 to 2009 during the tenure of Sello Moloto as Premier of Limpopo; he was Member of the Executive Council (MEC) for Health and Social Development. However, he was dropped from the Executive Council in 2009 by Cassel Mathale, who succeeded Moloto as Premier. Sekoati thus served the next few years, from 2009 to 2013, as an ordinary Member of the Limpopo Provincial Legislature.

=== Economic Development MEC: 2013–2019 ===
On 19 July 2013, Sekoati was reappointed to the Executive Council by Stan Mathabatha, who had recently succeeded Mathale as Premier after the ANC asked Mathale to resign. Mathabatha appointed Sekoati as MEC for Economic Development, Environment and Tourism. In the 2014 general election, Sekoati was ranked fifth on the ANC's party list and gained re-election to the provincial legislature, and Mathabatha reappointed him to his earlier portfolio. Sekoati ultimately served as MEC for Economic Development, Environment and Tourism until 2019, throughout Mathabatha's first full term as Premier.

=== ANC Regional Chairperson: 2013–2017 ===
In late November 2013, at a party regional elective conference in Phalaborwa that was later challenged in court, Sekoati was elected to succeed Joshua Matlou as Regional Chairperson of the ANC's Mopani branch. He beat David Maake, the outgoing Deputy Regional Chairperson, with 99 votes to Maake's 72. At the next regional elective conference in September 2017, held in Tzaneen, Sekoati ran for re-election but was defeated by Pule Shayi, who received 155 votes to his 131. With the national ANC's own elective conference upcoming, Sekoati and Shayi were viewed as supporting opposing contenders: while Shayi was viewed as an ally of Nkosazana Dlamini-Zuma, Sekoati was viewed as supporting Cyril Ramaphosa.

=== ANC Provincial Executive: 2018–2022 ===
In the months after he was ousted as Mopani Chairperson, Sekoati stood for election as Provincial Treasurer of the ANC's Limpopo branch. At the provincial elective conference in June 2018, he was beaten by Danny Msiza, who received 848 votes to his 688. However, delegates at the conference elected Sekoati to a four-year term as an ordinary member of the ANC Provincial Executive Committee. At the ANC's next provincial elective conference in 2022, Sekoati failed to gain re-election to the ANC Provincial Executive Committee.

=== Finance MEC: 2019–2024 ===
In the 2019 general election, Sekoati was re-elected to the provincial legislature, ranked 35th on the ANC's party list. Shortly after the election, Mathabatha announced his newly constituted Executive Council, in which Sekoati assumed the senior position of MEC for Finance, the political head of the Limpopo Treasury.

== Member of Parliament ==
Sekoati was elected to the National Assembly of South Africa in the 2024 general election.

== Personal life ==
Sekoati is married and has at least one child, an adult daughter.
