= Pinky Kekana =

South African politician (born 1966)

The Honourable Pinky Kekana MP
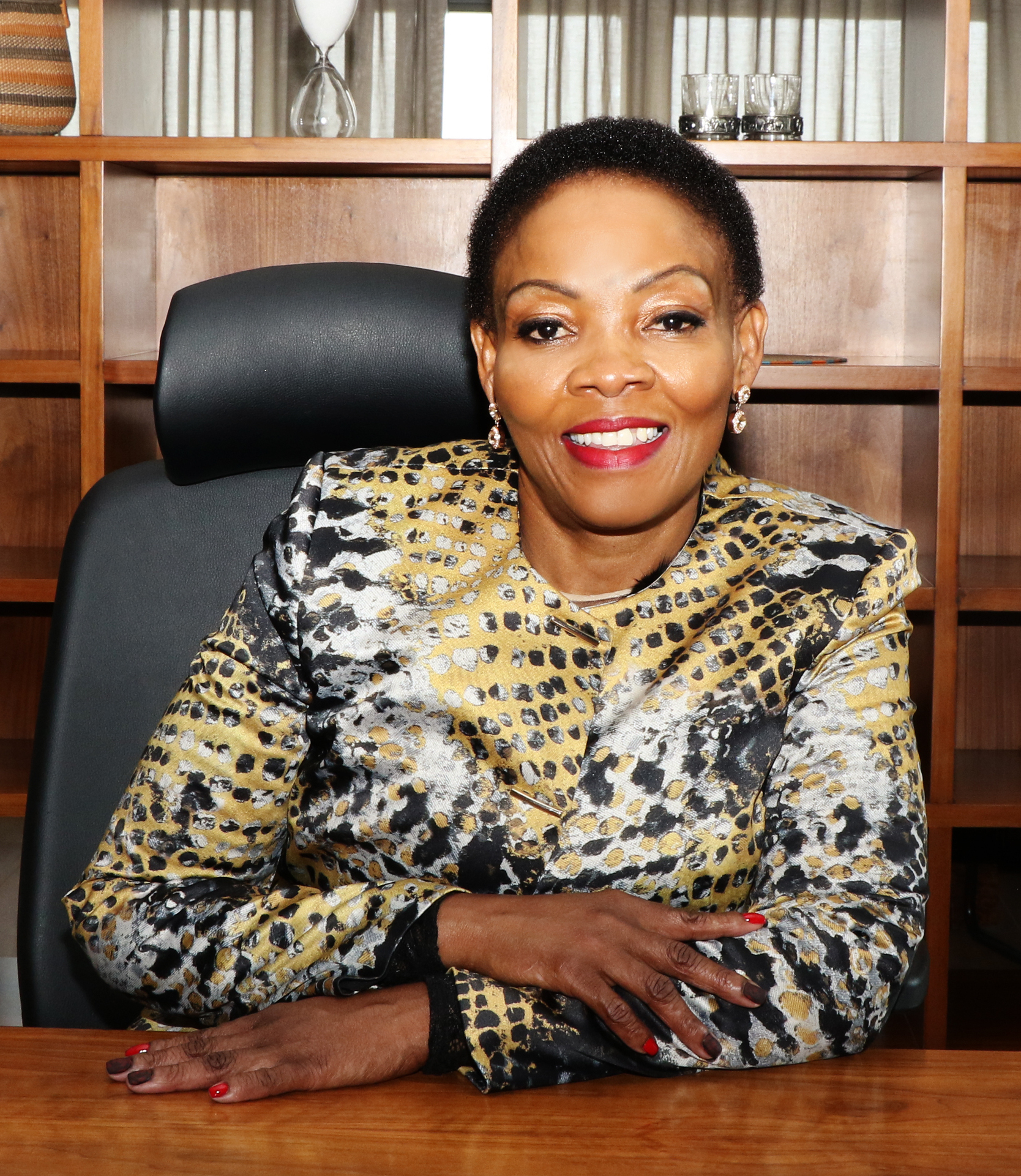
- Kekana in 2018

Deputy Minister of Public Service and Administration
- Incumbent
- Assumed office 3 July 2024
- Minister: Mzamo Buthelezi
- Preceded by: Chana Pilane-Majake

Deputy Minister in the Presidency for Planning, Monitoring and Evaluation
- In office 6 March 2023 – 19 June 2024
- President: Cyril Ramaphosa
- Minister: Maropene Ramokgopa
- Preceded by: Portfolio established
- Succeeded by: Seiso Mohai

Deputy Minister in the Presidency
- In office 5 August 2021 – 6 March 2023 Serving with Thembi Siweya
- President: Cyril Ramaphosa
- Minister: Mondli Gungubele
- Succeeded by: Kenneth Morolong; Nomasonto Motaung

Deputy Minister of Communications and Digital Technologies
- In office 27 February 2018 – 5 August 2021
- President: Cyril Ramaphosa
- Minister: Nomvula Mokonyane; Stella Ndabeni-Abrahams
- Succeeded by: Philly Mapulane

Member of the National Assembly
- Incumbent
- Assumed office 21 May 2014

Member of the Limpopo Executive Council for Economic Development, Environmental Affairs and Tourism
- In office March 2012 – July 2013
- Premier: Cassel Mathale
- Preceded by: Pitsi Moloto
- Succeeded by: Seaparo Sekoati

Member of the Limpopo Executive Council for Roads and Transport
- In office May 2009 – March 2012
- Premier: Cassel Mathale
- Succeeded by: Pitsi Moloto

Executive Mayor of Waterberg
- In office 2008–2009

Personal details
- Born: Pinky Sharon Kekana; 14 July 1966 (age 59) Bela-Bela, Transvaal; South Africa
- Children: Grant Kekana

Pinky Sharon Kekana (born 14 July 1966) is a South African politician from Limpopo who is currently the Deputy Minister of Public Service and Administration. A member of the African National Congress (ANC), she has served in the National Assembly of South Africa since May 2014 and in the national executive since February 2018.

A teacher by training, Kekana was a member of the Member of the Limpopo Provincial Legislature and served in the Limpopo Executive Council from 2009 to 2013 under Premier Cassel Mathale. She was elected to the National Assembly in the 2014 general election and was elected to the ANC National Executive Committee in 2017.

Thereafter, in February 2018, President Cyril Ramaphosa appointed her to the national executive. Before taking up her current position in July 2024, she was Deputy Minister of Communications from 2018 to 2021, Deputy Minister in the Presidency from 2021 to 2023, and Deputy Minister in the Presidency for Planning, Monitoring and Evaluation from 2023 to 2024. In December 2022, she was elected to a second five-year term in the ANC National Executive Committee.

== Early life and career ==
Born on 14 July 1966, Kekana was born and raised in Bela-Bela in present-day Limpopo province (then part of the Transvaal). After earning a Bachelor of Arts in education, she worked as a secondary school teacher in Bela-Bela.

== Provincial political career ==
Kekana was first elected to the Limpopo Provincial Legislature in 1999, representing the African National Congress (ANC). By 2008, she was the Executive Mayor of Limpopo's Waterberg District Municipality. In that year, at a party elective conference held in July, Kekana was elected as Deputy Provincial Secretary of the ANC's Limpopo branch, serving under Provincial Chairperson Cassel Mathale and Provincial Secretary Joe Maswanganyi.

=== MEC for Roads and Transport: 2009–2012 ===
Pursuant to the 2009 general election, Kekana returned to the provincial legislature, and she was additionally appointed to the Limpopo Executive Council by Mathale in his capacity as Premier of Limpopo. Mathale appointed her Member of the Executive Council (MEC) for Roads and Transport. Her department was placed under administration by the national government in 2011.

She was viewed as a political ally of Mathale and of ANC Youth League President Julius Malema. In 2012, the opposition Democratic Alliance called for her resignation after the Public Protector, Thuli Madonsela, said that Kekana had approved an improperly awarded state contract with a company linked to Malema. In a different report released the same year, Madonsela also said that Kekana had abused her position as MEC to "settle political scores" by ordering a traffic cop to arrest Thandi Moraka, a political opponent of Malema's. In December 2012, she concluded her term as ANC Deputy Provincial Secretary and was elected ANC Provincial Treasurer.

=== MEC for Economic Development: 2012–2013 ===
On 13 March 2012, when Premier Mathale announced a cabinet reshuffle in which Kekana swopped portfolios with Pitsi Moloto, becoming MEC for Economic Development, Environmental Affairs, and Tourism. In July 2013, the ANC asked Mathale to resign. His successor as Premier, Stan Mathabatha, announced a major reshuffle in which Kekana was one of eight MECs fired from the Executive Council; she was replaced by Charles Sekoati.

== National political career ==
The following year, in the 2014 general election, Kekana was elected to a five-year term in a seat in the National Assembly, the lower house of the national South African Parliament. She was ranked tenth on the ANC's provincial party list. In 2015, she was elected to the National Executive Committee of the ANC Women's League, and in December 2017, she was elected to the National Executive Committee of the mainstream ANC, ranked 47th of the 80 elected candidates by number of votes received.

On 27 February 2018, Kekana was appointed Deputy Minister of Communications by Cyril Ramaphosa, who had recently been elected as President of South Africa; Nomvula Mokonyane was appointed Minister of Communications in the same reshuffle. From November 2018, her portfolio was renamed Communications and Telecommunications, after Ramaphosa announced a merger of those respective ministries. In the 2019 general election, she was ranked 48th on the ANC's national party list and retained her legislative seat, as well as her position as Deputy Minister.

On 5 August 2021, Ramaphosa announced a mid-term reshuffle in which Kekana was appointed Deputy Minister in the Presidency, serving under Minister Mondli Gungubele. At the ANC's 55th National Conference in December 2022, she was re-elected to another five-year term on the party's National Executive Committee; by number of votes received, she was ranked 21st of the 80 candidates elected, receiving 1,518 votes across the 4,029 ballots cast in total.

In the aftermath of the 55th National Conference, on 6 March 2023, Ramaphosa announced a reshuffle in which Kekana was retained as a Deputy Minister in the Presidency but now was transferred to a specific portfolio: she became Deputy Minister in the Presidency for Planning, Monitoring and Evaluation, serving under Minister Maropene Ramokgopa.

In the next general election in May 2024, Kekana was re-elected to her parliamentary seat, ranked tenth on the ANC's national party list. Announcing his third cabinet on 30 June 2024, Ramaphosa appointed her as Deputy Minister of Public Service and Administration. In that capacity she deputises Mzamo Buthelezi of the opposition Inkatha Freedom Party, who was appointed to the portfolio under the new coalition government.

== Personal life ==
As of 2014, Kekana was married to Jerry Manyama, a civil servant; their son, Grant Kekana, is a professional football player.
