= Joyce Mashamba =

South African politician (1950–2018)

Member of the Limpopo Executive Council for Agriculture and Rural Development
- In office October 2017 – 20 June 2018
- Premier: Stan Mathabatha
- Preceded by: Mapula Mokaba-Phukwana
- Succeeded by: Basikopo Makamu

Member of the Limpopo Executive Council for Social Development
- In office 2014 – October 2017
- Premier: Stan Mathabatha
- Succeeded by: Mapula Mokaba-Phukwana

Member of the Limpopo Executive Council for Safety, Security and Liaison
- In office July 2013 – 2014
- Premier: Stan Mathabatha
- Preceded by: Florence Radzilani
- Succeeded by: Mapula Mokaba-Phukwana

Personal details
- Born: September 25, 1950 Mulamula, Malamulele; Transvaal, Union of South Africa
- Died: June 20, 2018 (aged 67)
- Party: African National Congress
- Other political affiliations: South African Communist Party
- Spouse: George Mashamba
- Education: University of South Africa
- Occupation: Politician; anti-apartheid activist

Happy Joyce Mashamba (25 September 1950 – 20 June 2018) was a South African politician and veteran of the African National Congress (ANC). At the time of her death, she was Member of the Executive Council (MEC) for Agriculture and Rural Development in the provincial government of Limpopo. She was also a member of the Central Committee of the South African Communist Party and a former member of the ANC National Executive Committee and the ANC Women's League National Executive Committee.

During apartheid, Mashamba was an anti-apartheid activist with her husband, George; she was imprisoned from 1977 to 1982 for running an underground ANC cell in Turfloop, Transvaal. In 1994 she was elected to the National Assembly and in 1999 she was elected to the Limpopo Provincial Legislature, where she spent the rest of her career. She served as MEC in six different portfolios under each of the first five Premiers of Limpopo and became the province's longest-serving MEC. She was also briefly Deputy Speaker of the Limpopo Provincial Legislature from 2012 to 2013.

== Early life and activism ==
Mashamba was born on 25 September 1950 in Mulamula, a small village in Malamulele in what was then the Northern Transvaal (now Limpopo province). She matriculated in 1975 and the following year became Assistant Librarian at the University of the North, where her husband, George, was a philosophy lecturer and Master's student. The university campus was at Mankweng, Transvaal (Turfloop), and during that period it was a central arena for student anti-apartheid politics, particularly in the Black Consciousness Movement. Mashamba was a founding member of the Mankweng Civic Association and served on its first executive committee.

In addition, according to Daphne Mashile-Nkosi, who knew Mashamba during apartheid, Mashamba was recruited into the African National Congress (ANC) underground in 1974. She was recruited during a meeting in Swaziland with the leaders of the ANC's Swaziland unit, including Jacob Zuma and Thabo Mbeki, who persuaded Mashamba and her husband to set up an underground ANC cell on the other side of the border in South Africa.

== Detention: 1976–1982 ==
In 1976 the Mashambas were arrested, along with S'bu Ndebele (then an ANC operative in Swaziland) and Percy Tshabalala, and were charged with "furthering the aims and objectives" of the ANC, which at the time was banned inside South Africa. Mashamba and the others pled not guilty in the Rand Supreme Court. During the trial, which lasted from October 1976 to February 1977, several state's witnesses testified that the Mashambas had attempted to recruit them into the ANC for political education and military training and had attempted to distribute ANC propaganda publications. Mashamba was also implicated in reconnaissance for the ANC: prosecutors alleged that she had gathered strategic information for the ANC about police stations and military camps in the Transvaal. Her husband later recalled that the state had presented evidence that, without his knowledge, Mashamba had occasionally driven ANC recruits into Swaziland; he said that when he asked her about it during the trial, she simply replied, "don't you know the [secrecy] rules of our organisation?".

In February 1977, Mashamba was convicted and sentenced to five years' imprisonment; her husband and Ndebele were sentenced to ten years on Robben Island. The Mashambas' three young children, all under the age of six, were raised by family while Mashamba served her sentence at Kroonstad Prison in the Free State. While in prison, Mashamba studied through the University of South Africa (Unisa), obtaining a Bachelor of Arts degree in 1982.

== Release: 1982–1994 ==
Upon her release in 1982, Mashamba lived in Newclare, Johannesburg in a house that became a de facto safe house for activists fleeing the Transvaal security police. From 1982 to 1985, she was a development officer at the South African Council of Churches (SACC), working especially at the Dependants' Conference, an organisation formed by the SACC to support political prisoners and their families. She was also the national organiser for the Federation of Transvaal Women from 1985. Having continued her underground political work, she was rearrested during the state of emergency of 1986, a year before her husband was released from prison.

The ANC was unbanned by the South African government in 1990 and began reestablishing its above-ground internal structures, including the ANC Women's League. Mashamba was active in the Northern Transvaal regional branch of the Women's League, and she was elected the branch's chairperson in 1991 and its deputy chairperson in 1992. In addition, Mashamba completed an Honours degree in philosophy at Unisa in 1990; a management certificate at Wits University in 1990; and a certificate in South African education research at Essex University, under Harold Wolpe, in 1991. Between 1992 and 1993, she did Master's coursework in development administration at the School for International Training in Brattleboro, Vermont. Over the same period, she held a series of jobs in higher education. She was housekeeper at one of the student residences at Wits from 1989 to 1990; a bursary consultant at World University Service from 1990 to 1991; and assistant registrar in the financial aid office of the University of the North from 1991 to 1994.

== Government career: 1994–2018 ==
When apartheid was abolished in 1994, Mashamba was elected to the National Assembly in South Africa's first democratic elections. She held the seat as an ANC representative until 1997, when she was appointed chief executive officer of the Northern Training Trust. In the next general election in 1999, she was elected as a Member of the Limpopo Provincial Legislature. In 2000, the inaugural Premier of Limpopo, Ngoako Ramatlhodi, appointed her to the provincial executive as Member of the Executive Council (MEC) for Sports, Arts and Culture. Over the next decades, she held several portfolios as MEC under five successive premiers. Her portfolios were Sports, Arts and Culture (2000–2001 and 2006–2012), Education (2001–2004), Finance (2004–2006), Safety, Security and Liaison (2013–2014), Social Development (2014–2017), and Agriculture and Rural Development (2017–2018).

During this period, she departed from the Executive Council only for one brief period: in a March 2012 reshuffle, Premier Cassel Mathale fired Mashamba as MEC for Sports, Arts and Culture, replacing her with Dipuo Letsatsi-Duba, and Mashamba was made Deputy Speaker of the Limpopo Provincial Legislature. In July 2013, Stan Mathabatha took office as premier and reappointed Mashamba to the Executive Council as MEC for Safety, Security and Liaison. In 2018, SABC News said that Mashamba was Limpopo's longest-serving MEC.

Mashamba also remained active in party-political offices. She was elected as a member of the National Executive Committee of the ANC Women's League in 1999 and was re-elected to her seat in 2003 and 2008. She also ascended through the ranks of the ANC itself. She was elected to the Provincial Executive Committee of the ANC in Limpopo for the first time in 1998, and she subsequently served two terms as Deputy Provincial Chairperson of the ANC in Limpopo from 2002 to 2008. Towards the end of her second term, in 2007, she was elected to the National Executive Committee of the ANC, ranked 63rd of the 80 candidates elected; she was re-elected to another five-year term in 2012, ranked 44th. Finally, although membership of the South African Communist Party (SACP) is typically secret, the SACP said in 2018 that Mashamba was a "long-standing" member; she was elected to the SACP Central Committee in 2007 and remained a member when she died, having been re-elected in 2012 and 2017.

== Death ==
Mashamba died on 20 June 2018 after a long illness. The memorial proceedings were four days long and included one service organised by the Tripartite Alliance and a special sitting of the Limpopo Provincial Legislature; she was given a provincial official funeral on 30 June, which was attended by former President Jacob Zuma. She was buried in her home village, Mulamula.

She was Limpopo MEC for Agriculture and Rural Development at the time of her death and was replaced by Basikopo Makamu in July 2018.

== Personal life ==
Mashamba was married to George Mashamba, who was arrested with her in 1976 and who also served in the Limpopo Provincial Legislature and on the SACP Central Committee. They married in September 1969 and at the time of her death had three sons, one daughter, and seven grandchildren.
