= Provincial governments of South Africa =

The nine provinces of South Africa are governed by provincial governments which form the second layer of government, between the national government and the municipalities. The provincial governments are established, and their structure defined, by Chapter Six of the Constitution of South Africa.

The provincial governments are structured according to a parliamentary system in which the executive is dependent on and accountable to the legislature. In each province the provincial legislature is directly elected by proportional representation, and the legislature in turn elects one of its members as Premier to head the executive. The Premier appoints an Executive Council (a cabinet), consisting of members of the legislature, to administer the various departments of the provincial administration.

The powers of the provincial governments are circumscribed by the national constitution, which limits them to certain listed "functional areas". In some areas the provincial governments' powers are concurrent with those of the national government, while in other areas the provincial governments have exclusive powers. The constitution prescribes a principle of "co-operative government" whereby the various layers of government must co-ordinate their actions and legislation; it also lays down a series of rules for resolving conflicts between national and provincial legislation.

== Legislature ==
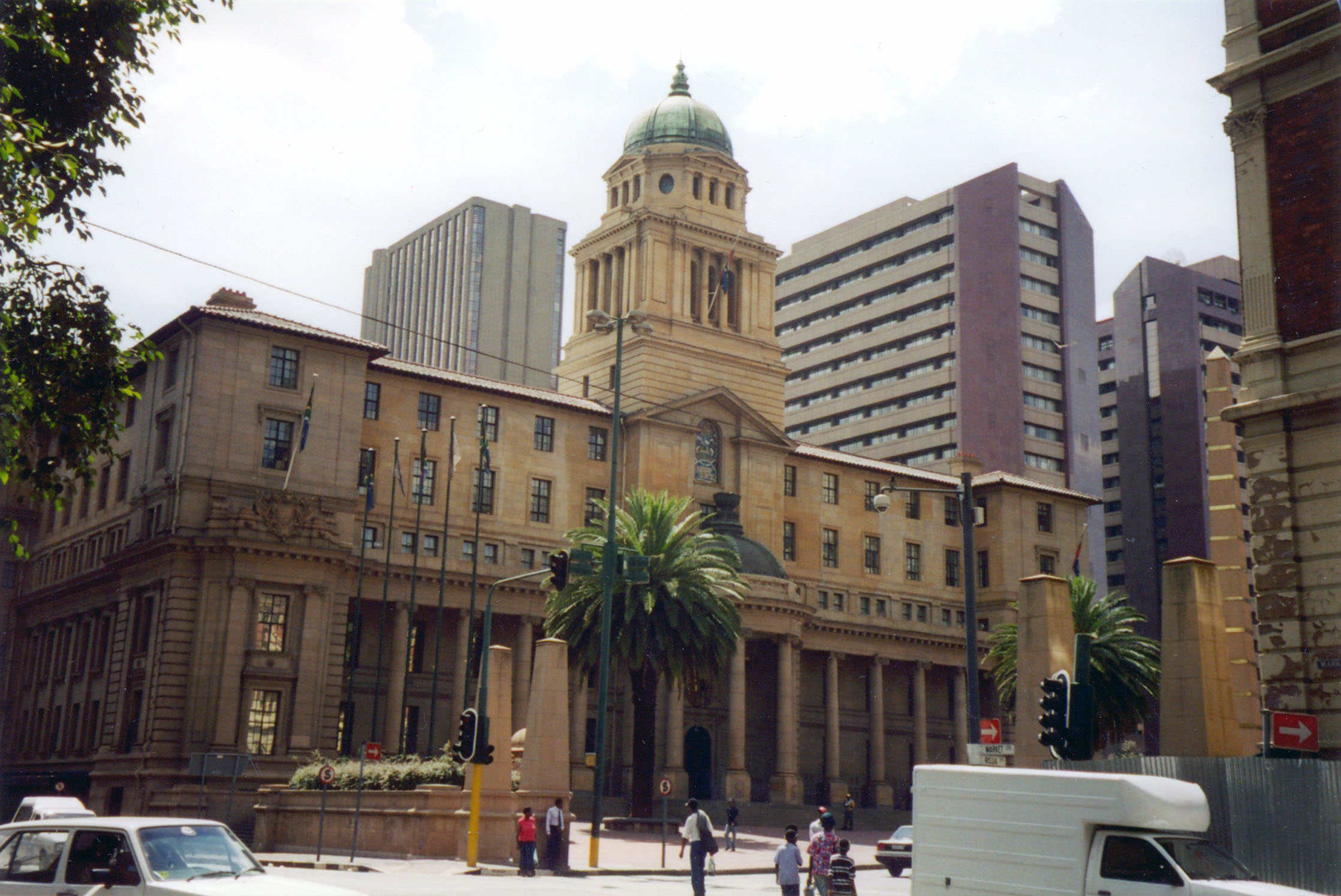
Johannesburg City Hall, now the seat of the Gauteng Provincial Legislature

Each province has a unicameral provincial legislature, varying in size from 30 to 80 members depending on the population of the province. The members of the provincial legislature are elected by party-list proportional representation for a usual term of five years, although under certain circumstances the legislature may be dissolved before its term expires. By convention, elections to the provincial legislatures are held on the same day as elections to the National Assembly; the most recent of such election was held on 28 May 2024. At that election, the African National Congress (ANC), won a majority in five of the provinces, while the Democratic Alliance (DA) won a majority in the Western Cape. The provinces of Gauteng, KwaZulu-Natal and the Northern Cape are governed through coalition governments.

Legislature	Seats																			
Legislature	ANC	DA	MK	EFF	IFP	PA	VF+	ActionSA	UDM	ACDP	ATM	ACT	RISE	BOSA	NFP	UAT	NCC	Al Jama-ah	GOOD	Total
Eastern Cape Provincial Legislature	45	11	1	8	0	2	1	0	3	0	1	0	0	0	0	0	0	0	0	72
Free State Legislature	16	7	1	4	0	0	1	0	0	0	0	1	0	0	0	0	0	0	0	30
Gauteng Provincial Legislature	28	22	8	11	1	2	2	3	0	1	0	0	1	1	0	0	0	0	0	80
KwaZulu-Natal Legislature	14	11	37	2	15	0	0	0	0	0	0	0	0	0	1	0	0	0	0	80
Limpopo Legislature	48	4	1	9	0	0	1	0	0	0	0	0	0	0	0	1	0	0	0	64
Mpumalanga Provincial Legislature	27	6	9	7	0	0	1	1	0	0	0	0	0	0	0	1	0	0	0	51
North West Provincial Legislature	23	5	1	7	0	0	1	1	0	0	0	0	0	0	0	1	0	0	0	38
Northern Cape Provincial Legislature	15	7	0	4	0	3	1	0	0	0	0	0	0	0	0	1	0	0	0	30
Western Cape Provincial Parliament	8	24	0	2	0	3	1	0	0	1	0	0	0	0	0	0	1	1	1	42
Totals	224	97	58	54	16	10	9	5	3	2	1	1	1	1	1	1	1	1	1	487

== Executive ==
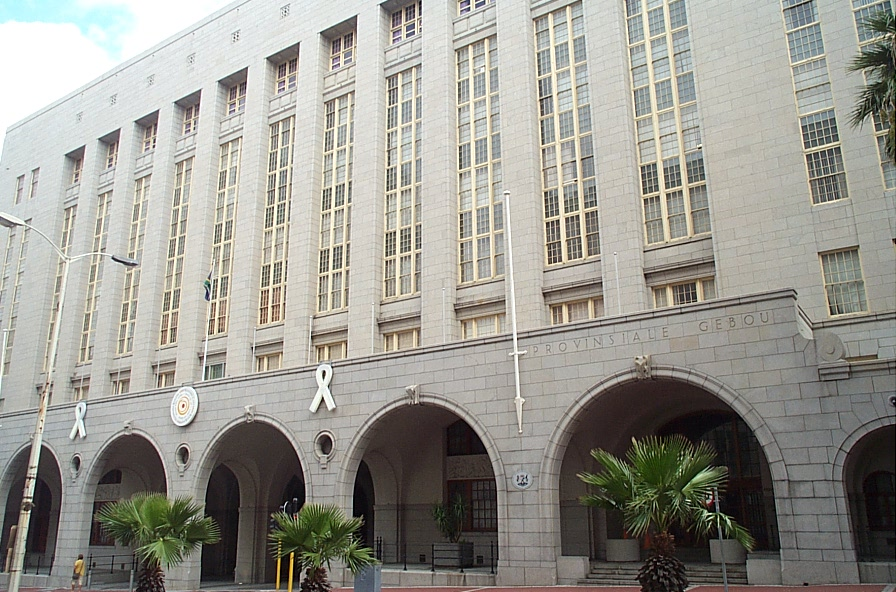
7 Wale Street, the seat of the Western Cape Government

The head of the provincial executive is the Premier, who is elected by the provincial legislature from among its members; frequently the Premier will be the provincial leader of the majority party.

The term of office of the Premier is the same as that of the legislature (normally five years) with a term limit of two terms.

The legislature can force the resignation of the Premier by a motion of no confidence. If the Premiership is vacant and the legislature fails to elect a new Premier within 30 days, the legislature is dissolved and an election is called.

As of June 2024, the nine Premiers are:

- Premier of the Eastern Cape: Oscar Mabuyane (ANC)
- Premier of the Free State: Maqueen Letsoha-Mathae (ANC)
- Premier of Gauteng: Panyaza Lesufi (ANC)
- Premier of KwaZulu-Natal: Thami Ntuli (IFP)
- Premier of Limpopo: Phophi Ramathuba (ANC)
- Premier of Mpumalanga: Mandla Ndlovu (ANC)
- Premier of North West: Lazzy Mokgosi (ANC)
- Premier of the Northern Cape: Zamani Saul (ANC)
- Premier of the Western Cape: Alan Winde (DA)

The Premier appoints an Executive Council (a cabinet) of five to ten members of the provincial legislature. The Members of the Executive Council (or MECs) are responsible for the various departments of the provincial administration.

Because the responsibilities of the provincial governments are limited to those listed in the Constitution, the portfolios are quite similar across the provinces. Common MEC portfolios and Departmental responsibilities include:

- Agriculture
- Arts & Culture
- Economic Development
- Education
- Environmental Affairs
- Finance
- Health
- Human Settlements
- Local Government
- Police (or Public Safety)
- Public Works
- Roads & Transport
- Social Development
- Sport and Recreation (or Cultural Affairs & Sport)
- Tourism

Several of these areas may be combined into one department, and the portfolio of one MEC.

== Judiciary ==
South Africa has a single national court system, and the administration of justice is the responsibility of the national government. In each province there is a division of the High Court of South Africa, but the boundaries of jurisdiction of the divisions do not always correspond exactly to the provincial boundaries.

The provincial executive does play a role in the selection of High Court judges, as the Premier of a province is ex officio a member of the Judicial Service Commission when it deals with matters relating to a High Court division that sits in that province.

== Provincial constitutions ==
A provincial legislature can, by a two-thirds majority vote, adopt a constitution for the province; it is not necessary to do so, as the national constitution provides a complete structure for provincial government. A provincial constitution must be consistent with the national constitution except that it can provide for different structures and procedures for the executive and the legislature.

The only province that has adopted a constitution is the Western Cape; in doing so it chose to rename its legislature the Provincial Parliament. It also calls its Executive Council the Provincial Cabinet, and the MECs are called Provincial Ministers.

== See also ==
- Government of the Eastern Cape
- Government of Gauteng
- Government of KwaZulu-Natal
- Government of the Northern Cape
- Government of the Western Cape
