= Norman Mashabane =

South African politician (1956–2007)

Personal details
- Born: 1956 Phalaborwa, Limpopo, South Africa
- Died: 2007 (aged 50–51)
- Party: African National Congress
- Spouse: Maite Nkoana-Mashabane

Norman Mashabane (26 June 1956 in Phalaborwa – 10 October 2007) was a former South African ambassador to Indonesia. He was a member of the African National Congress. He was recalled from Indonesia after sexual harassment charges were laid against him; he was subsequently cleared by a foreign affairs inquiry.

For a short time thereafter he was an adviser to then Limpopo premier Sello Moloto, and a member of the Limpopo provincial legislature. He was later found guilty of sexual harassment charges in the Pretoria High Court, and quit his post as political adviser. He was killed in a car accident outside the provincial capital Polokwane in 2007.
