= Nandi Ndalane =

South African politician

Nandi Ndalane MP

Member of the National Assembly of South Africa
- Incumbent
- Assumed office 14 June 2024

Member of the Limpopo Executive Council for Social Development
- Incumbent
- Assumed office 6 October 2022
- Premier: Stan Mathabatha
- Preceded by: Dickson Masemola

Member of the Limpopo Executive Council for Agriculture and Rural Development
- In office 22 May 2019 – 6 October 2022
- Premier: Stan Mathabatha
- Preceded by: Basikopo Makamu
- Succeeded by: Thabo Mokone

Member of the Limpopo Executive Council for Public Works, Roads and Infrastructure
- In office October 2017 – May 2019
- Premier: Stan Mathabatha
- Preceded by: Jerry Ndou
- Succeeded by: Monicca Mochadi

Personal details
- Born: June 1963 (age 63) Elim, Vhembe; Northern Transvaal, South Africa
- Party: African National Congress

Nandi Annah Ndalane (born 1963) is a South African politician who has been a Member of the National Assembly of South Africa since 2024. She served in the Limpopo Executive Council from 2014 and in the Limpopo Provincial Legislature from 1999 until 2024.

Ndalane was Member of the Executive Council (MEC) for Sports, Arts and Culture from 2014 to 2016; MEC for Transport, Safety and Security from 2016 to 2017; MEC for Public Works, Roads and Infrastructure from 2017 to 2019; MEC for Agriculture and Rural Development from 2019 to 2022; and MEC for Social Development from 2022 until 2024. She is a member of the African National Congress (ANC) and was formerly a local leader of the ANC in her home region of Vhembe; she also served a term as a member of the Limpopo ANC's Provincial Executive Committee from 2018 to 2022.

== Early life and career ==
Ndalane was born in June 1963 in Elim in Vhembe in present-day Limpopo province. In the final years of apartheid, she worked in community development at a local non-governmental organisation called Akanani. During the first post-apartheid elections in 1994, she served as a party agent on the winning campaign of the African National Congress (ANC), and she was subsequently elected as a local councillor in the Vuwani–Hlanganani Transitional Local Council.

== Career in provincial government ==
Ndalane was first elected as a Member of the Limpopo Provincial Legislature in the 1999 general election. While serving in the legislature, she rose through the ranks of the local ANC, becoming Deputy Regional Chairperson and later, from 2007, Regional Treasurer of the ANC's branch in Vhembe. In the fourth session of the Limpopo Provincial Legislature – following the 2009 general election, in which Ndalane was re-elected to her seat ranked 18th on the ANC's party list – she chaired the legislature's committee on sports, arts and culture.

In the 2014 general election, Ndalane was re-elected, on that occasion ranked 39th on the ANC's party list. She was also appointed to the Limpopo Executive Council by Stan Mathabatha, who had been elected to his first full term as Premier of Limpopo; she became Member of the Executive Council (MEC) for Sports, Arts and Culture. She held that position until a cabinet reshuffle on 15 September 2016, when she was moved to the Transport, Safety and Security portfolio. In October 2017, she was moved again, to the Public Works, Roads and Infrastructure portfolio, which was viewed as more senior. While in that office, at the ANC's provincial elective conference in June 2018, Ndalane was elected as an ordinary member of the Provincial Executive Committee of the Limpopo ANC.

In the 2019 general election, Ndalane was ranked 15th on the ANC's party list and was re-elected to the provincial legislature. She was also reappointed to Mathabatha's Executive Council, where she took up the post of MEC for Agriculture and Rural Development. At the ANC's next provincial elective conference in June 2022, she became one of several MECs who failed to gain re-election to the ANC Provincial Executive Committee, a development which was seen as rendering her politically vulnerable. In October 2022, Mathabatha transferred her to the Social Development portfolio.

Ndalane was elected to the National Assembly of South Africa in the 2024 general election.
