= Machwene Semenya =

South African politician

Member of the National Assembly of South Africa
- In office 21 May 2014 – 28 May 2024
- Constituency: National List

Personal details
- Born: Machwene Rosina Semenya; 16 November 1969 (age 56)
- Party: African National Congress
- Profession: Politician

Machwene Rosina Semenya (born 16 November 1969) is a South African politician who served as the Chairperson of the Portfolio Committee on Human Settlements from 2021 until 2024. A member of the African National Congress, she had previously served as the Chairperson of the Portfolio Committee on Agriculture, Forestry and Fisheries from 2014 to 2019 and as the Chairperson of the Portfolio Committee on Human Settlements, Water and Sanitation from 2019 to 2021. Semenya was a member of parliament from 2014 until 2024.

== Political career ==
A member of the African National Congress, Semenya had previously served as a Member of the Executive Council (MEC) in the Limpopo provincial government. In July 2013, she was appointed by premier Stanley Mathabatha as the MEC for Agriculture.

Semenya was elected to the National Assembly of South Africa in the 2014 general election from the ANC's national list. She was then elected to chair the Portfolio Committee on Agriculture, Forestry and Fisheries.

She was re-elected to the National Assembly in 2019. She was elected to serve as chairperson of the Portfolio Committee on Human Settlements, Water and Sanitation.

Following a cabinet reshuffle in August 2021, in which the Human Settlements, Water and Sanitation ministry was split into two new ministries, Semenya was announced as the chairperson of the newly re-established Portfolio Committee on Human Settlements.

In May 2022, Semenya said that there was "overwhelming support" for the Housing Consumer Protection Bill, which aims to protect consumers from poorly built houses, in two public hearings held in Gauteng.

Machwene stood for reelection at 143rd on the ANC's national list in the 2024 general election which was too low to secure reelection and left parliament.
