= George Phadagi =

South African politician

George Muthundinne Phadagi

Member of the African National Congress

Mayor of Thohoyandou
- In office 1994–1999

Member of the National Parliament
- In office 2002–2008

Member of the Executive Council (MEC) for Public Works
- In office 2010–2011

Member of the Executive Council (MEC) for Safety, Security and Liaison
- In office 2010–2011

Personal details
- Born: 26 June 1952 Tswinga village, South Africa
- Died: 13 May 2012 (aged 59)
- Party: African National Congress
- Spouse(s): Thinamaano; Violet Masindi
- Children: Siza, Thivhusi, Muthelo, Aiho, Andza
- Education: Venda College of Education
- Occupation: Politician, Teacher

George Muthundinne Phadagi (26 June 1952 – 13 May 2012), was a member of the African National Congress (ANC), former Member of Parliament, South African struggle stalwart, politician, mayor, and former MEC. He served as the first mayor of Thohoyandou from 1994 to 1999, then member of the National Parliament from 2002 to 2008 and towards the end of his life was MEC of Public Works and MEC of Safety Security and Liaison in 2010 to 2011 and was political consultant to then Premier of Limpopo Cassel Mathale when he died in 2012.

== Biography ==
Phadagi was born in Tswinga village in 1952 as the third born son of Muthelo and Nyamukamadi Phadagi.Phadagi's political journey started in the 1970s while he was still a student. George Phadagi started school in Tswinga Primary School and went to Lwamondo Secondary School to do Standard 6 to Standard 8. He then went to Mphaphuli Secondary School, where he did Standard 9 and Standard 10, and that is where he started to be involved in politics. He was the organiser of the South African Student Movement while at this school.

== Teaching career ==
Phadagi went to train as a teacher at the Venda College of Education and completed his diploma in 1977. He organised a bus that transported ANC members to the funeral of the late Comrade Steve Biko in 1977. He was one of the leaders of the historical Venda March that took place in 1977. He worked as a teacher at Holy Trinity School in Atteridgeville, where he also continued to be involved in politics. While working at Saulsridge he was selected by members of the party to go and study politics. He later trained as Umkhonto we Sizwe cadre together with other members of the party. He was forced to join Tuata, a teacher union which worked cooperatively with the government at that time but was later expelled from the school because he defaulted on monthly contributions for the union. He also worked as a teacher at Wallmansthal High School. He was arrested for his involvement in politics and was represented by Mr Dikgang Moseneke, who was a well-known attorney at that time. After his release from prison he went back to Venda to continue with his work as a teacher. He taught in Mphaphuli Secondary School, Muvhavha Secondary School, Murangoni Primary School and Guyuni Primary School. The reason behind his deployment to primary schools was to protect the high school students because he was going to influence them to join politics. He quit teaching and joined Metropolitan Insurance Company, where he continued to be active in politics.

== Political career ==
George also held various political leadership roles within the ANC, including as chairperson of the Far North Region of the ANC, coordinator of the Northern Transvaal Co-ordinating Committee for the United Democratic Front (South Africa), Provincial Executive Committee member of the Northern Transvaal Region and as coordinator of the 1994 national elections as leader of the Sub-Regional Election Committee. He was appointed as the chairperson of ANC's Far North branch. In 1995 he was appointed as the mayor of Greater Thohoyandou during the Transitional Local Councils. He also served as a councillor in Thulamela Local Municipality. The ANC sent him to Parliament in 2001, where he served on the Portfolio Committee on Communications. He also served on the Portfolio Committee on Provincial and Local Government from 2004 to 2009.

Phadagi served in various capacities within the government, including as a Member of the Executive Council (MEC) for Public Works in Limpopo and MEC for Safety, Security and Liaison in 2010 and 2011 respectively.

Towards the end of his parliamentary activities Phadagi was involved in the development of school diaries, The Advertiser magazine and The Valley Messenger newspaper. Phadagi had a wife Thinamaano, two sons, Siza and Thivhusiwi and two daughters Muthelo and Aiho. his second wife was Violet Masindi, whom they had a daughter named Andza.
