= Dikeledi Magadzi =

South African politician (1949/1950–2025)

Deputy Minister of Water and Sanitation
- In office 5 August 2021 – 6 March 2023 Serving with David Mahlobo
- President: Cyril Ramaphosa
- Preceded by: Position split
- Succeeded by: Judith Tshabalala

Deputy Minister of Transport
- In office 30 May 2019 – 5 August 2021
- President: Cyril Ramaphosa
- Preceded by: Sindisiwe Chikunga
- Succeeded by: Sindisiwe Chikunga

Chairperson of the Portfolio Committee on Transport
- In office 24 June 2014 – 7 May 2019
- Preceded by: Nozabelo Ruth Bhengu
- Succeeded by: Mosebenzi Zwane

Member of the National Assembly of South Africa
- In office 21 May 2014 – 9 March 2023
- Succeeded by: Phori Phetlhe

Personal details
- Born: Dikeledi Phillistus Magadzi; 1949 or 1950
- Died: 28 December 2025 (aged 75)
- Party: African National Congress
- Children: 5

Dikeledi Phillistus Magadzi (1949 or 1950 – 28 December 2025) was a South African politician. She was a member of the African National Congress and a Member of the National Assembly from 2014 to 2023. She was chairperson of the Portfolio Committee on Transport from 2014 to 2019, as Deputy Minister of Transport from 2019 to 2021 and as Deputy Minister of Water and Sanitation from 2021 until 2023. Magadzi had previously been a Member of the Executive Council (MEC) in the Limpopo Provincial Government.

== Life and career ==
Magadzi was a member of the African National Congress. From 1994 to 1998, she served as the Member of the Executive Council (MEC) responsible for the public works portfolio in the Limpopo Provincial Government. She was then the MEC for agriculture from 2004 to 2009 and as the MEC for safety and security from 2009 to 2010. Magadzi was a member of the Federation of South African Women, a member of the national executive committee of the African National Congress Women's League from 1990 to 1996, the National Education, Health and Allied Workers' Union (NEHAWU) from 1987 to 1994 and the United Democratic Front (UDF) from 1985 to 1990. From 2007 to 2022, she was on the National Executive Committee of the African National Congress. Magadzi had five children and two grandchildren.

In 2014, Magadzi was elected to the National Assembly as one of 249 ANC MPs. She was elected to chair the Portfolio Committee on Transport (2014–2019).

Following her re-election in 2019, she was appointed the Deputy Minister of Transport. In August 2021, Magadzi was appointed Deputy Minister of Water and Sanitation.

Magadzi unsuccessfully stood for re-election to the NEC at the ANC's 55th National Conference in December 2022. She was removed as Deputy Minister and replaced with Judith Tshabalala in a cabinet reshuffle on 6 March 2023. By 15 March 2023, Magadzi had resigned as a Member of Parliament.

Magadzi died on 28 December 2025, at the age of 75.
