= Premier of Limpopo =

Head of government of Limpopo province, South Africa

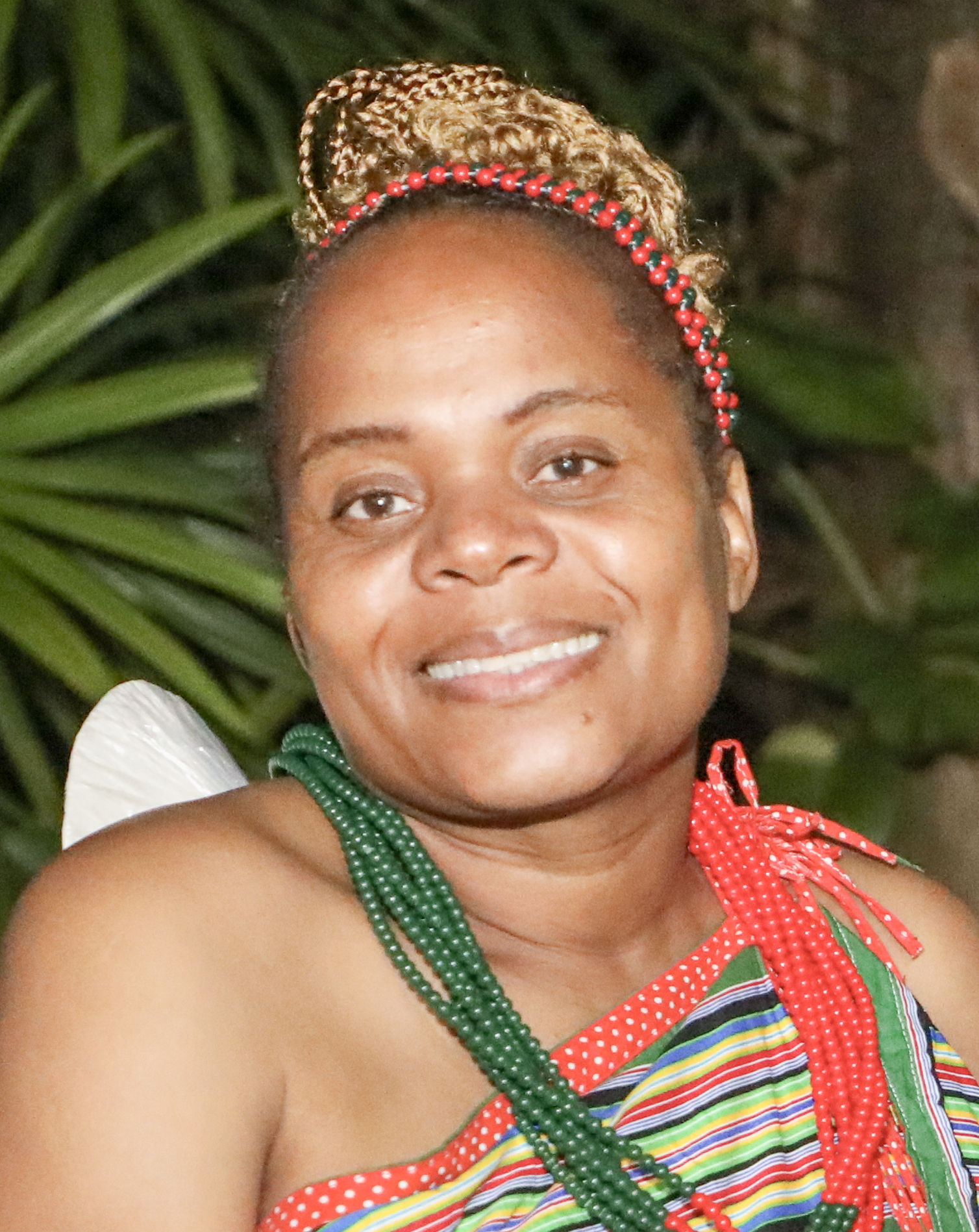
- Incumbent; Phophi Ramathuba since 14 June 2024
- Style: The Honourable
- Appointer: Limpopo Legislature
- Term length: Five years, renewable once
- Constituting instrument: Constitution of South Africa
- Inaugural holder: Ngoako Ramatlhodi
- Formation: 7 May 1994
- Website: www.limpopo.gov.za/premier_page/overview.asp

The premier of Limpopo is the head of government of Limpopo province of South Africa. The current premier of Limpopo is Phophi Ramathuba, a member of the African National Congress, who was elected on 14 June 2024, following the 2024 national and provincial elections. She is the first woman to hold the office.

== Functions ==
In terms of the constitution, the executive authority of a province is vested in the premier. The premier appoints an Executive Council made up of ten members of the provincial legislature; they are known as Members of the Executive Council (MECs). The MECs are effectively ministers and the Executive Council a cabinet at the provincial level. The premier has the ability to appoint and dismiss MECs at his/her own discretion.

The premier and the Executive Council are responsible for implementing provincial legislation, along with any national legislation assigned to the province. They set provincial policy and manage the departments of the provincial government; their actions are subject to the national constitution.

In order for an act of the provincial legislature to become law, the premier must sign the legislation. The premier can refer legislation back to the legislature for reconsideration if the premier believes the act is unconstitutional. If the premier and the legislature cannot agree, the act must be referred to the Constitutional Court for a final decision.

The premier is also ex officio a member of the National Council of Provinces, the upper house of Parliament, as one of the special delegates from the province.

== List ==
No.	Portrait	Name (Birth–Death)	Term of office			Political party
No.	Portrait	Name (Birth–Death)	Took office	Left office	Time in office	Political party
1		Ngoako Ramatlhodi (born 1955)	7 May 1994	22 April 2004	9 years, 351 days	African National Congress
-		Catherine Mabuza (acting)	22 April 2004	26 April 2004	4 days	African National Congress
2		Sello Moloto (born 1964)	26 April 2004	2 March 2009	4 years, 310 days	African National Congress
3		Cassel Mathale (born 1961)	3 March 2009	18 July 2013	4 years, 137 days	African National Congress
4		Stanley Mathabatha (born 1957)	18 July 2013	14 June 2024	10 years, 332 days	African National Congress
5		Phophi Ramathuba (born 1973)	14 June 2024	Incumbent	2 years, 85 days	African National Congress

== Election ==
The election for the Limpopo Provincial Legislature is held every five years, simultaneously with the election of the National Assembly; the last such election occurred on 29 May 2024. At the first meeting of the provincial legislature after an election, the members choose the premier from amongst themselves. The provincial legislature can force the premier to resign by a motion of no confidence. If the premiership becomes vacant (for whatever reason) the provincial legislature must choose a new premier to serve out the period until the next election. One person cannot have served more than two five-year terms as premier; however, when a premier is chosen to fill a vacancy the time until the next election does not count as a term.

== See also ==
- Politics of Limpopo
- Premier (South Africa)
- President of South Africa
- Politics of South Africa
