= List of members of the 6th Limpopo Provincial Legislature =

6th Limpopo Provincial Legislature
←	5th Legislature	7th Legislature	→

Overview
- Legislative body: Limpopo Provincial Legislature
- Jurisdiction: Limpopo, South Africa
- Term: 22 May 2019 – 28 May 2024
- Election: 8 May 2019
- Members: 49
- Speaker: Rosemary Molapo (2020–2024); Mavhungu Lerule-Ramakhanya (2019–2020)
- Deputy Speaker: Tshitereke Matibe (2022–2024); Jerry Ndou (2019–2022)
- Premier: Stan Mathabatha

This is a list of members of the sixth Limpopo Provincial Legislature, as elected in the election of 8 May 2019 and taking into account changes in membership since the election. The legislature served until 28 May 2024, when it was dissolved ahead of that month's general election.

Following the election of 8 May 2019, the legislature held its first sitting on 22 May 2019, with Judge President Ephraim Makgoba presiding. The legislature elected Stan Mathabatha as Premier, Mavhungu Lerule-Ramakhanya as Speaker, and Essob Mokgonyana as Chief Whip. Jerry Ndou was Deputy Speaker. The chairpersons of the legislature's committees were formally appointed in July 2019.

Lerule-Ramakhanya joined the Executive Council of Limpopo in March 2020, and Rosemary Molapo succeeded her as Speaker in July 2020. In October 2022, Ndou was transferred from the provincial legislature to the National Council of Provinces, and he was succeeded as Deputy Speaker by Tshitereke Matibe.

== Composition ==
Party	Seats
African National Congress	38
Economic Freedom Fighters	7
Democratic Alliance	3
Freedom Front Plus	1
Total	49

== Members ==
Name	Party	Position
Mokgadi Aphiri	ANC	Member
Polly Boshielo	ANC	Member
Jossey Buthane	EFF	Member
Nakedi Kekana	ANC	Member
Kedibone Lebea-Olaiya	ANC	Member
Nakedi Lekganyane	ANC	Member
Mavhungu Lerule-Ramakhanya	ANC	Member
Risham Maharaj	DA	Member
Mahlodi Mahasela	ANC	Member
Basikopo Makamu	ANC	Member
Makoma Makhurupetje	ANC	Member
Lilliet Mamaregane	ANC	Member
Tebogo Mamorobela	ANC	Member
Lilian Managa	EFF	Member
Tinyiko Manganye	EFF	Member
Marcelle Maritz	FF+	Member
Jacob Marule	ANC	Member
Jerry Maseko	ANC	Member
Mmabogahla Masekoameng	ANC	Member
Victor Mashamaite	ANC	Member
Stanley Mathabatha	ANC	Member
Simon Mathe	ANC	Member
Violet Mathye	ANC	Member
Tshitereke Matibe	ANC	Deputy Speaker
Joshua Matlou	ANC	Member
Falaza Mdaka	ANC	Member
Sekutu Mochadi	ANC	Member
Charles Mohlala	EFF	Member
Mapula Mokaba-Phukwana	ANC	Member
Essob Mokgonyana	ANC	Member
Thabo Mokone	ANC	Member
Rosemary Molapo	ANC	Speaker
Rodgers Monama	ANC	Member
Sarah Monyamane	ANC	Member
Thandi Moraka	ANC	Member
Regina Mphahlele	EFF	Member
Nandi Ndalane	ANC	Member
Katlego Phala	DA	Member
Rudolph Phala	ANC	Member
Florence Radzilani	ANC	Member
Nkakareng Rakgoale	ANC	Member
Phophi Ramathuba	ANC	Member
George Raphela	EFF	Member
Charles Sekoati	ANC	Member
Donald Selamolela	ANC	Member
Che Selane	ANC	Member
Rebecca Seono	ANC	Member
Jetrick Seshoka	EFF	Member
Jacques Smalle	DA	Member

== Former members ==
Name	Party	Replacement
Lehlogonolo Masoga	ANC	Joshua Matlou
Goodman Mitileni	ANC	Tshitereke Matibe
Jerry Ndou	ANC	Tebogo Mamorobela
Dickson Masemola	ANC	Lilliet Mamaregane

The ANC's Lehlogonolo Masoga resigned during the first session of the legislature and was replaced by Joshua Matlou in August 2019. In January 2020, Tshitereke Matibe was sworn in as a member after Goodman Mitileni, also of the ANC, resigned to take up a party position. In October 2022, Premier Stan Mathabatha announced that Jerry Ndou and Dickson Masemola would resign and take up seats in the National Council of Provinces (NCOP); their seats in the provincial legislature were filled by Tebogo Mamorobela and Lilliet Mamaregane, both formerly of the NCOP.
