= List of members of the 5th Limpopo Provincial Legislature =

5th Limpopo Provincial Legislature
←	4th Legislature	6th Legislature	→

Overview
- Legislative body: Limpopo Provincial Legislature
- Jurisdiction: Limpopo, South Africa
- Term: 21 May 2014 – 7 May 2019
- Election: 7 May 2014
- Members: 49
- Speaker: Mirriam Ramadwa
- Deputy Speaker: Lehlogonolo Masoga
- Premier: Stan Mathabatha

This is a list of members of the fifth Limpopo Provincial Legislature, as elected in the election of 7 May 2014. The legislature was controlled by the African National Congress, which held 39 seats in the 49-seat chamber.

At the first sitting of the legislature on 21 May 2014, members were sworn in to their seats and elected Stan Mathabatha to a full term in his office as Premier of Limpopo. Mirriam Ramadwa was elected as Speaker of the Limpopo Provincial Legislature, and Lehlogonolo Masoga was elected as her deputy. Ramadwa was replaced by Polly Boshielo in October 2015.

== Current composition ==
Party	Seats
African National Congress	39
Economic Freedom Fighters	6
Democratic Alliance	3
Congress of the People	1
Total	49

== Members ==
This is a list of members of the fifth legislature as elected on 7 May 2014. It does not take into account changes in membership after the election.

Name	Party
Mokgadi Aphiri	ANC
Masele Solly Chego	ANC
Thibedi Gideon Chepape	ANC
Frederick Thinamaano Dau	ANC
Sentle Lavius Emmanuel Fenyane	ANC
Sylvia Snowy Kennedy-Monyemoratho	ANC
Mamoyagale Gertrude Kgalamadi	ANC
Ishmael Kgatjepe	ANC
Soviet Lekganyane	ANC
Makoma Makhurupetje	ANC
Maite Rebecca Marutha	ANC
Mmabogahla Masekoameng	ANC
Dickson Masemola	ANC
Joyce Mashamba	ANC
Lehlogonolo Masoga	ANC
Joe Maswanganyi	ANC
Stanley Mathabatha	ANC
Violet Mathye	ANC
Bertha Amanda Joyce Matshoge	ANC
Falaza Mdaka	ANC
Goodman Mitileni	ANC
Mapula Mokaba-Phukwana	ANC
Rosemary Molapo	ANC
Onicca Moloi	ANC
Thandi Moraka	ANC
Ndzimeni Sylvia Mudau	ANC
Nandi Ndalane	ANC
Tshameleni Emma Ndlovu	ANC
Jerry Ndou	ANC
Lydia Ngwenya	ANC
Kwena Elias Nong	ANC
Thembi Nwedamutswu	ANC
Rudolph Phala	ANC
Mirriam Ramadwa	ANC
Thotogelo Daniel Sebabi	ANC
Charles Sekoati	ANC
Lucy Manthepa Seloane	ANC
Shahidabibi Shaikh	ANC
Rob Tooley	ANC
Patrick Sikhutshi	COPE
Phillip Langa Bodlani	DA
Katlego Phala	DA
Jacques Smalle	DA
Jossey Buthane	EFF
Meisie Kennedy	EFF
Mapula Johanna Ledwaba	EFF
Matome Eric Machaka	EFF
Michael Rahlagane Mathebe	EFF
George Raphela	EFF
