= Soviet Lekganyane =

South African politician (born 1974)

The Honourable Soviet Lekganyane MP
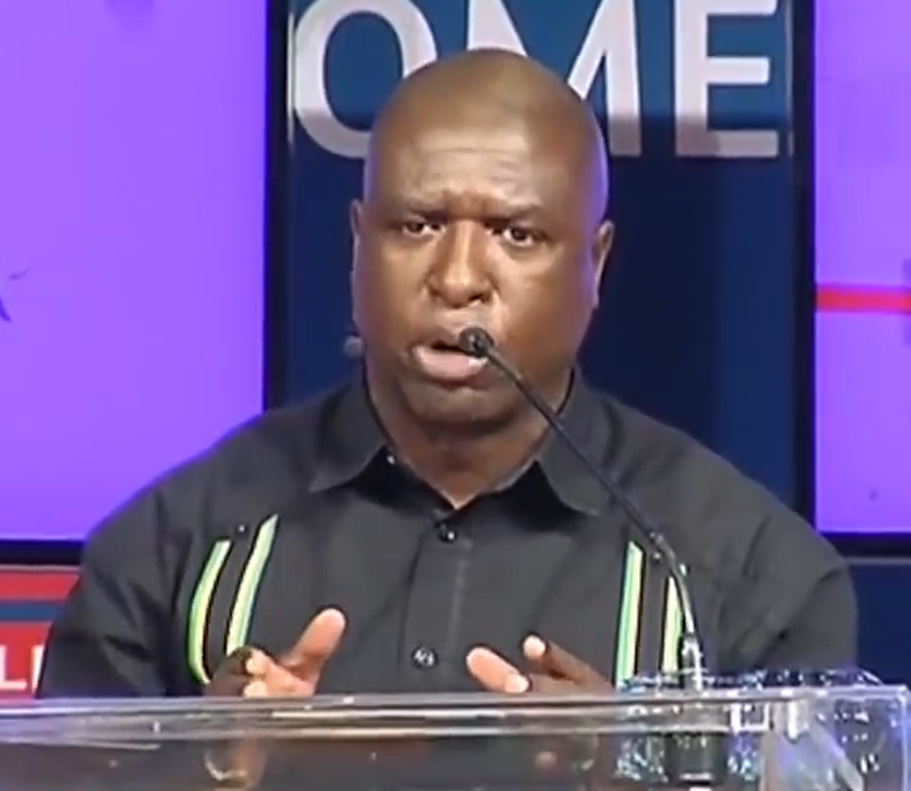

Member of the National Assembly
- Incumbent
- Assumed office 14 June 2024

Provincial Secretary of the African National Congress in Limpopo
- In office June 2018 – June 2022
- Deputy: Basikopo Makamu
- Chairperson: Stan Mathabatha
- Preceded by: Nocks Seabi
- Succeeded by: Reuben Madadzhe
- In office December 2011 – March 2013
- Deputy: Florence Radzilani
- Chairperson: Cassel Mathale
- Preceded by: Joe Maswanganyi
- Succeeded by: Nocks Seabi

Member of the Limpopo Provincial Legislature
- In office 2014–2018
- In office 2009–2012

Member of the Limpopo Executive Council for Local Government and Housing
- In office 2009–2012
- Premier: Cassel Mathale
- Preceded by: Maite Nkoana-Mashabane
- Succeeded by: Clifford Motsepe

Personal details
- Born: Molapi Soviet Lekganyane; 18 April 1974 (age 52)
- Party: African National Congress
- Other political affiliations: South African Communist Party

Molapi Soviet Lekganyane (born 18 April 1974) is a South African politician from Limpopo who has represented the African National Congress (ANC) in the National Assembly since June 2024. He was elected to a five-year term on the ANC's National Executive Committee in December 2022.

Lekganyane rose to prominence as the Provincial Secretary of the South African Communist Party in Limpopo from 2008 to 2011. Thereafter he served two terms as Provincial Secretary of the ANC in Limpopo, from 2011 to 2013 under Cassel Mathale and from 2018 to 2022 under Stan Mathabatha. He also served two partial terms in the Limpopo Provincial Legislature from 2009 to 2012 and from 2014 to 2018; during the first period, he was also the Member of the Limpopo Executive Council for Local Government and Housing.

== Early life ==
Lekganyane was born on 18 April 1974.

== Career in provincial politics ==
Lekganyane rose to political prominence in the South African Communist Party (SACP) of Limpopo province: he was elected as Provincial Secretary of the SACP's Limpopo branch from August 2008 to March 2011. He was also a member of the African National Congress (ANC), the SACP's close ally, and was a member of the ANC's Provincial Executive Committee in Limpopo by 2011.

=== Executive Council: 2009–2012 ===
In May 2009, after the 2009 general election, the Premier of Limpopo, Cassel Mathale, appointed Lekganyane to his Executive Council, where he succeeded Maite Nkoana-Mashabane as Member of the Executive Council (MEC) for Local Government and Housing.

While he was in this post, in early March 2011, Lekganyane resigned as SACP Provincial Secretary, saying that his relationship with the party had broken down. According to Lekganyane, the national leadership of the SACP had become overly invested in leadership battles in the ANC, had targeted the Limpopo branch SACP because of the Limpopo branch's close relationship with the provincial ANC Youth League and Julius Malema, and had pressured Lekganyane as Housing MEC to award state contracts to SACP comrades. The SACP publicly disowned these claims as a "campaign of lies, slander and malicious distortions intended to inflict maximum damage and to create confusion within the ranks of the SACP and beyond".

=== ANC Provincial Secretary: 2011–2013 ===
In December 2011, Lekganyane was elected to the powerful position of Provincial Secretary of the Limpopo ANC. He won the election by about 100 votes, receiving 601 votes against the 517 for the incumbent, Joe Maswanganyi. He ran on an informal slate aligned to Premier Mathale, who won election as ANC Provincial Chairperson at the same party conference. In order to take up the full-time ANC position, Lekganyane resigned from the Executive Council; he was replaced by Clifford Motsepe in March 2012.

As Provincial Secretary, Lekganyane supported an unsuccessful bid by Kgalema Motlanthe to succeed Jacob Zuma as ANC President at the party's 53rd National Conference in December 2012. The Limpopo ANC ultimately endorsed this position. In the aftermath of the national conference, in March 2013, the national ANC leadership disbanded the Limpopo Provincial Executive Committee, with ANC Secretary-General Gwede Mantashe saying that provincial leaders had displayed "totally un-ANC behaviour and institutionalised factional conduct". Lekganyane's four-year term as Provincial Secretary therefore ended prematurely.

Nonetheless, Lekganyane continued to avow loyalty to the ANC leadership; in June 2013, he publicly disowned his former ally Julius Malema – by then expelled from the ANC – and his new party, the Economic Freedom Fighters, which Lekganyane called a "libertine initiative". Towards the end of 2013, he launched a campaign to be re-elected as ANC Provincial Secretary when the provincial party elected its new leadership. He was named as part of a slate aligned to Dickson Masemola, who intended to contest for the party chairmanship. However, when the provincial elective conference was held in February 2014, both Lekganyane and Masemola withdrew from contention, leaving Nocks Seabi to succeed Lekganyane as Provincial Secretary.

=== Provincial Legislature: 2014–2018 ===
Lekganyane was listed 31st on the ANC's provincial electoral list in the 2014 general election and won a seat in the Limpopo Provincial Legislature. During his four years in the legislature, he chaired its finance committee.

=== ANC Provincial Secretary: 2018–2022 ===
Towards the end of his term in the legislature, Lekganyane stood again for election as ANC Provincial Secretary in Limpopo. The SACP opposed Lekganyane's candidacy, saying that he had a poor record as a leader both in the ANC and in the SACP. Nonetheless, at the next provincial elective conference held in Polokwane in June 2018, Lekganyane won the election, beating ANC Youth League Provincial Chairperson Lehlogonolo Masoga with 931 votes to Masoga's 618. As in 2012, he resigned from the provincial legislature to take up the position; his seat was filled by Tolly Mashamaite.

In the aftermath of his election, Lekganyane told the Mail & Guardian that he believed that the ANC should pursue an anti-corruption campaign ahead of the 2019 general election; in particular, he supported taking action against ANC politicians implicated in the VBS Mutual Bank scandal. Also while secretary, Lekganyane was accused of assaulting another ANC member during a party branch meeting in Polokwane. The altercation took place on 5 June 2021 during an argument about the nomination of candidates to stand for the ANC in the 2021 local government elections; the complainant alleged that Lekganyane assaulted him, "grabbing me by my private parts", and saying "today I'm going to kill you". The complainant opened a case of sexual assault against Lekganyane and his alleged accomplices, who in turn opened a case of malicious property damage against the complainant, whom they alleged had damaged equipment during the scuffle.

Ahead of the expiry of his term as ANC Provincial Secretary in June 2022, Lekganyane ran for re-election, on a slate broadly opposed to Stan Mathabatha, the incumbent ANC Provincial Chairperson and Premier. According to the Mail & Guardian, Lekganyane had lost favour with Mathabatha's camp because of the perception that Lekganyane had betrayed them in order to gain favour with the allies of ANC President Cyril Ramaphosa. Lekganyane's candidacy was initially opposed by Danny Msiza, but Msiza was obliged by the ANC's step-aside policy to withdraw his name from contention. Thus, at the provincial elective conference in June 2022, Lekganyane ran against Reuben Madadzhe, who beat him with 714 votes against his own 451.

== Career in national politics ==
Shortly after the provincial elective conference, in December 2022, the ANC held its 55th National Conference at Nasrec, where Lekganyane stood for election to the party's National Executive Committee (NEC). The conference elected him to a five-year term on the committee; by number of votes received, he was ranked 17th of the 80 candidates elected, receiving 1,653 votes across the 4,029 ballots cast in total. At the NEC's first meeting in February 2023, he was elected as deputy chairperson of the ANC National Dispute Resolution Committee, serving under committee chairperson Mduduzi Manana. He was also appointed as a member of the ANC National Disciplinary Committee of Appeal and as the head of the NEC's delegation to the party's provincial branch in the North West Province.

In the next general election, held in May 2024, Lekganyane stood as an ANC candidate, ranked 15th on the party's national list. He was elected to a seat in the National Assembly, the lower house of the South African Parliament. The ANC said that it would nominate him and Fasiha Hassan to represent Parliament at the Judicial Service Commission.
