= Tebogo Mamorobela =

South African politician

Tebogo Mamorobela MPL

Deputy Speaker of the Limpopo Provincial Legislature
- Incumbent
- Assumed office 14 June 2024
- Premier: Phophi Ramathuba
- Preceded by: Tshitereke Matibe

Member of the Limpopo Provincial Legislature
- Incumbent
- Assumed office 6 October 2022

Delegate to the National Council of Provinces
- In office 14 February 2022 – 6 October 2022
- Constituency: Limpopo

Personal details
- Citizenship: South Africa
- Party: African National Congress

Tebogo Portia Mamorobela is a South African politician who has been the Deputy Speaker of the Limpopo Provincial Legislature since June 2024. She represented the African National Congress (ANC) in the provincial legislature since October 2022. Before that, she served a brief stint in the National Council of Provinces from February to October 2022. She was formerly a local councillor in Makhado.

== Career in local government ==
Mamorobela entered politics through the South African Students Congress and the South African Youth Council. In the 2011 local elections, she was elected as a proportional-representation councillor, representing the ANC, in Limpopo's Makhado Local Municipality, then led by Mayor Mavhungu Lerule. She was a member of the Provincial Executive Committee of the Limpopo branch of the ANC Youth League from 2012 to 2014 and was also active in the Limpopo branch of the ANC Women's League. By 2020, she was Deputy Chairperson of the ANC's subregional branch in Makhado and served as an executive councillor in the Makhado Mayoral Committee.

In April 2020, while Mamorobela was a councillor, a video was published of her drinking champagne and dancing with friends at the height of South Africa's COVID-19 lockdown. The gathering reportedly took place to celebrate Mamorobela's 39th birthday. The video received attention on social media and, following a criminal complaint by the opposition Democratic Alliance, Mamorobela and two others were arrested for contravening the national lockdown regulations. She appeared in court and was released on R1,000 bail. The criminal charge was provisionally withdrawn in August, but in the interim Mamorobela was suspended by the ANC and asked to recuse herself from her municipal work in line with the party's step-aside rule. She was also suspended as a member of the board of Brand SA. In September, local media reported that Mamorobela had been arrested again, allegedly for a late-night drunken car accident in her Ford Ranger.

== Legislative career ==
While holding her seat as a councillor, Mamorobela had stood in the 2019 general election as an ANC candidate the National Council of Provinces (NCOP), but she had been ranked 40th on the ANC's provincial party list and had not secured a seat. In February 2022, a casual vacancy opened in an ANC seat after Tshitereke Matibe's resignation, and Mamorobela was sworn in as a Delegate to the NCOP. Later that year, in October, the ANC announced that she and fellow delegate Lilliet Mamaregane would move to ANC seats in the Limpopo Provincial Legislature; their NCOP seats were taken by former provincial legislators Dickson Masemola and Jerry Ndou.

Following the 2024 election, Mamorobela was elected deputy speaker of the provincial legislature.
