= Joshua Matlou =

South African politician (born 1971)

Joshua Matlou MPL

Member of the Limpopo Provincial Legislature
- Incumbent
- Assumed office 1 August 2019

Executive Mayor of Mopani
- In office 2009–2014
- Preceded by: Matome Humphrey Mokgobi
- Succeeded by: Nkakareng Rakgoale

Personal details
- Born: Leswafo Joshua Matlou; 21 December 1971 (age 54)
- Citizenship: South Africa
- Party: African National Congress

Leswafo Joshua Matlou (born 21 December 1971) is a South African politician who has represented the African National Congress (ANC) in the Limpopo Provincial Legislature since 2019. He was formerly the Mayor of Mopani District Municipality from 2009 until 2014, when the ANC asked him to resign. He also served as the chairperson of the ANC's influential Mopani branch from 2009 to 2013 and before that was the Provincial Chairperson of the ANC Youth League in Limpopo.

== ANC Youth League ==
Matlou rose to prominence as the Provincial Chairperson of the Limpopo branch of the ANC Youth League (ANCYL). He was elected to that position in 2006 alongside ANCYL Provincial Secretary Julius Malema. Matlou and Malema were still working alongside each other in 2008, when Matlou supported Malema's successful bid to be elected President of the national ANCYL. He became known as a close ally and friend of Malema and of Cassel Mathale, who was from Mopani and who was elected ANC Provincial Chairperson in 2008.

== Mayor of Mopani: 2009–2014 ==
In 2009, Matlou was inaugurated as Executive Mayor of the Mopani District Municipality. Later that year, at a regional party elective conference in September, Matlou was elected as Regional Chairperson of the mainstream ANC's branch in the Mopani region, succeeding Matome Humphrey Mokgobi, who had held the position for 17 years. Matlou's candidacy was supported by Mathale, while the other candidate, Dimond Mushwana, was aligned to Mathale's rival Joe Maswanganyi. However, Mushwana withdrew from the race at the conference, leaving Matlou to stand unopposed. He was deputised by David Maake.

The ANC caucus retained Matlou as Mayor of Mopani after the 2011 local elections. He was also re-elected unopposed as ANC Regional Chairperson in May 2012. Later in 2012, amaBhungane and the Sunday Independent alleged that Matlou was implicated in procurement irregularities in Mopani, apparently also involving other associates of Mathale and Malema. In May 2013, Matlou lost his position as ANC Regional Chairperson when the ANC's provincial leadership – no longer led by Mathale – disbanded the entire leadership corps of Mopani and two other regional branches. When fresh leadership elections were held in November that year, Matlou did not run for re-election and he was succeeded as Regional Chairperson by Seaparo Sekoati.

Then, on 24 June 2014, the ANC announced that Matlou was one of four Limpopo mayors whom the party had asked to resign; he was replaced by Nkakareng Rakgoale. Although the ANC said that the decision was based on an assessment of the municipality's performance, several newspapers reported that Matlou and the others had been dismissed because they were viewed as aligned to Mathale, to Malema, and to Malema's new party the Economic Freedom Fighters (EFF). In particular, sources told News24 that Matlou was being punished because he had effectively helped fund the EFF by awarding Mopani municipal contracts to Malema's associates. Matlou confirmed that he was still Malema's close friend but said that there was "nothing wrong with that" and denied involvement in factionalism. After vacating the mayoral office, he additionally resigned from the Mopani local council in mid-July.

== Provincial legislature: 2019–present ==
By early 2018, Matlou was campaigning to make a political comeback through election to a top leadership position in the Limpopo branch of the ANC; his supporters said that he would aim to be included on the slate of Stan Mathabatha, who was running for re-election as ANC Provincial Chairperson. At the next party elective conference, held in June 2018, Matlou did not stand for a top leadership position but was elected to a four-year term as an ordinary member of the ANC Provincial Executive Committee.

The following year, he stood in the 2019 general election as an ANC candidate for the Limpopo Provincial Legislature. He was ranked 39th on the ANC's provincial party list, meaning that he narrowly failed to secure one of 38 seats won by the ANC in the election. However, later in 2019, a casual vacancy arose when Lehlogonolo Masoga resigned from the legislature; Matlou was sworn in to replace him in August. He failed to gain re-election to the ANC Provincial Executive Committee in 2022.
