= Goodman Mitileni =

South African politician

Member of the Limpopo Provincial Legislature
- In office 21 May 2014 – 2021

Personal details
- Citizenship: South Africa
- Party: African National Congress
- Other political affiliations: South African Communist Party

Wisani Goodman Mitileni, sometimes also spelled Mtileni, is a South African politician who represented the African National Congress (ANC) in the Limpopo Provincial Legislature from 2014 to 2021. He resigned from the legislature after being elected Regional Secretary of the ANC's Mopani in June 2021 and the favorite to take over as the regional chairperson of the ANC in Norman Mashabane region . Less than a year later, in March 2022, he was elected as Provincial Chairperson of the Limpopo branch of the South African Communist Party (SACP).

== ANC Youth League ==
Mitileni joined the ANC as a teenager and served as the secretary of a local branch in 1993 to 1994 while he was in his last year of high school. He remained active in the ANC and ANC Youth League (ANCYL) in subsequent years while he qualified, and then worked for five years, as a teacher. He later entered public administration as a youth development officer in the Mopani District Municipality, in which capacity he became a regional leader of the South African Municipal Workers' Union (SAMWU). In December 2005, he was elected simultaneously as Provincial Chairperson of SAMWU's Limpopo branch and as Provincial Deputy Secretary of the ANCYL's Limpopo branch.

In the ANCYL role, he deputised Julius Malema, and in 2008, he became acting Provincial Secretary of the Limpopo ANCYL after Malema was elected to more senior office as national ANCYL President. Mitileni continued in that position until the league's next provincial elective conference, held in Makhado in April 2010. Mitileni – along with his deputy Thandi Moraka and ANCYL Provincial Chairperson Lehlogonolo Masoga – was part of a group that led a walkout from the Makhado conference, protesting against what they described as Malema's attempts to interfere in the conference and install his allies in leadership positions.

In the aftermath, the national ANCYL leadership laid disciplinary charges against Mitileni and Masoga. Both had been removed from their positions at their conference but they continued to dispute the fairness of the election,. and for some time thereafter Mitileni acted as secretary in a parallel ANCYL structure, headed by Masoga, which vied with the Malema-endorsed provincial league for legitimacy. At the same time, Mitileni continued to work in public administration.

== Provincial legislature ==
Pursuant to the 2014 general election, Mitileni was sworn into the Limpopo Provincial Legislature for the first time, having been ranked 29th on the ANC's provincial party list. During the legislative term that followed, Mitileni ascended the ranks of the provincial SACP. At a party elective conference in Polokwane in May 2016, he was elected First Deputy Provincial Secretary of the Limpopo SACP, serving under Provincial Secretary Gilbert Kganyago. Subsequently, when Kganyago resigned in November 2018 in connection with the corruption scandal at VBS Mutual Bank, Mitileni was appointed to step in as acting Provincial Secretary.

He was re-elected to his legislative seat in the 2019 general election, ranked third on the party list. Less than halfway into his second legislative term, in June 2021, Mitileni was elected unopposed as Regional Secretary of the ANC's largest branch in Limpopo, the Norman Mashabane branch in Mopani. He ran on a slate aligned to Mopani Mayor Pule Shayi, who was elected Regional Chairperson at the same party conference. Because the secretariat was a full-time position, Mitileni was obliged to resign from the provincial legislature to take it up; his seat was filled by Tshitereke Matibe in January 2022.

In addition to the ANC Regional Secretary position, Mitileni continued to act as SACP Provincial Secretary until fresh elections were held in March 2022; in those elections, he was elected as SACP Provincial Chairperson, with Phophi Ramathuba as his deputy.
