= Mavhungu Lerule-Ramakhanya =

South African politician (born 1973)

The Honourable Mavhungu Lerule-Ramakhanya MPL

Limpopo MEC for Education
- Incumbent
- Assumed office 29 June 2022
- Premier: Phophi Ramathuba; Stanley Mathabatha
- Preceded by: Polly Boshielo

Limpopo MEC for Transport and Community Safety
- In office 23 March 2020 – 29 June 2022
- Premier: Stanley Mathabatha
- Preceded by: Dickson Masemola
- Succeeded by: Polly Boshielo

Speaker of the Limpopo Provincial Legislature
- In office 22 May 2019 – 23 March 2020
- Deputy: Jeremiah Ndou
- Preceded by: Polly Boshielo
- Succeeded by: Rosemary Molapo

Member of the Limpopo Provincial Legislature
- Incumbent
- Assumed office 22 May 2019

Mayor of the Vhembe District Municipality
- In office 14 December 2018 – 22 May 2019
- Preceded by: Florence Radzilani
- Succeeded by: Dowelani Nenguda

Personal details
- Born: Mavhungu Maureen Lerule; 6 May 1973 (age 53)
- Party: African National Congress
- Spouse: Happy
- Occupation: Member of the Executive Council
- Profession: Politician

Mavhungu Maureen Lerule-Ramakhanya (born 6 May 1973) is a South African politician. A member of the African National Congress, Lerule-Ramakhanya is a former mayor of the Vhembe District Municipality. She was elected as a Member of the Limpopo Provincial Legislature in May 2019. She was then elected as the speaker of the legislature. In March 2020, Lerule-Ramakhanya was appointed as the Member of the Executive Council (MEC) for Transport and Community Safety. She was moved to the Education portfolio of the executive council in June 2022.

== Political career ==
Lerule-Ramakhanya is a long-standing member the African National Congress. She took office as mayor of the Makhado Local Municipality on 1 December 2008, succeeding Glory Mashaba. In April 2012, the ANC provincial executive committee resolved to remove three mayors. The party reasoned that poor service delivery was behind its decision. Lerule-Ramakhanya was one of the three and she stepped down as mayor on 22 April. Farisani Mutavhatsindi was appointed as her successor.

On 14 December 2018, Lerule-Ramakhanya was elected mayor of the Vhembe District Municipality. She succeeded Florence Radzilani, who resigned following her involvement in the VBS Mutual Bank controversy. She was sworn in by High Court Judge Frans Kgomo on the same day.

For the provincial election that was held on 8 May 2019, Lerule-Ramakhanya was placed 13th on the party's provincial list. She was elected to the Limpopo Provincial Legislature as the ANC won 38 seats. She was sworn in as an MPL on 22 May 2019. The ANC selected her as their candidate for speaker, and she was elected.

On 23 March 2020, premier Stanley Mathabatha appointed Lerule-Ramakhanya as the Member of the Executive Council responsible for the provincial Department of Transport and Community Safety, succeeding Dickson Masemola. The changes came into effect on the same day. Rosemary Molapo succeeded her as speaker of the legislature.

On 29 June 2022, Mathabatha conducted a reshuffle of his executive, in which he moved Lerule-Ramakhanya to the Education portfolio and appointed the outgoing Education MEC Polly Boshielo as the new MEC for Transport and Community Safety.

Following her re-election in the 2024 general election, she remained as MEC for Education in the executive council led by the newly elected premier Phophi Ramathuba.

== Personal life ==
Lerule-Ramakhanya married Dr Happy Ramakhanya in July 2011.
