= Che Selane =

South African politician

Che Selane MPL

Member of the Limpopo Provincial Legislature
- Incumbent
- Assumed office 22 May 2019

Personal details
- Party: African National Congress

Bonnie David "Che" Selane is a South African politician who has represented the African National Congress (ANC) in the Limpopo Provincial Legislature since 2019. He was formerly the Provincial Deputy Chairperson of the Limpopo branch of the ANC Youth League (ANCYL) from 2015 to 2021.

Selane was an active member of the ANCYL and acted as spokesperson for the league's Limpopo branch. At a league elective conference in April 2012, he was elected to the Provincial Executive Committee of the Limpopo ANCYL. At the next elective conference in May 2015, he was elected Provincial Secretary of the Limpopo ANCYL, serving under Provincial Chairperson Vincent Shoba with Jimmy Machaka as his deputy. During its term, the league leadership corps had a hostile relationship with Stan Mathabatha, the incumbent Premier of Limpopo.

Both Shoba and Selane were re-elected to their league offices at a controversial conference in August 2017. In October 2018, the Provincial Executive Committee of the mainstream ANC in Limpopo suspended Selane from his office, citing media reports that Selane had improperly benefitted from corruption at VBS Mutual Bank. He was reinstated in November.

In the 2019 general election, Selane was elected to a seat in the Limpopo Provincial Legislature, ranked 25th on the ANC's party list. However, his term as ANCYL Provincial Deputy Chairperson ended when the leadership corps was disbanded in 2021.
