= Lehlogonolo Masoga =

South African politician

Member of the Limpopo Provincial Legislature
- In office 2009–2019

Member of the Limpopo Executive Council for Roads and Transport
- In office July 2013 – May 2014
- Premier: Stan Mathabatha
- Preceded by: Pitsi Moloto
- Succeeded by: Position abolished

Personal details
- Born: 1975 or 1976 (age 50–51) Jane Furse, Transvaal; South Africa
- Party: African National Congress
- Education: University of Limpopo; Leeds Beckett University

Matjie Lehlogonolo Alfred Masoga (born 1975/1976) is a South African politician who represented the African National Congress (ANC) in the Limpopo Provincial Legislature from 2009 to 2019. He was Limpopo's Member of the Executive Council for Roads and Transport from July 2013 to May 2014 and he subsequently served as Deputy Speaker of the Limpopo Provincial Legislature from 2014 to 2019. He rose to prominence as the Provincial Chairperson of the Limpopo branch of the ANC Youth League, although he was expelled from the league in July 2010 after falling out with league president Julius Malema.

== Early life and education ==
Masoga was born in 1975 or 1976 in Jane Furse in Sekhukhune in present-day Limpopo province. He has two Master's degrees, both earned in 2017, one in development studies from the University of Limpopo and one in leadership from Leeds Beckett University.

== ANC Youth League ==
Masoga rose to political prominence as Provincial Chairperson of the Limpopo branch of the African National Congress (ANC) Youth League (ANCYL). He was viewed as the protégé of national ANCYL President Julius Malema and in 2008 was a key supporter of the successful bid to have Malema's ally Cassel Mathale elected as Provincial Chairperson of the mainstream ANC in Limpopo. By 2009, Masoga was also a Member of the Limpopo Provincial Legislature, and the ANCYL lobbied for him to be appointed to the Limpopo Executive Council under Mathale, who had been elected Premier of Limpopo. However, Masoga was not appointed and, according to the Sowetan, this damaged his relationship with Malema, whom he accused of orchestrating his exclusion from the Executive Council.

By early 2010, Frans Moswane had launched a campaign to oust Masoga as ANCYL Provincial Chairperson, apparently with Malema's backing. At the league's next provincial elective conference in Makhado in April 2010, Moswane won the chairmanship in chaotic circumstances after the police entered the conference venue and Masoga and his supporters led a walk-out. After the conference, Masoga accused Malema of having intervened in support of Moswane – including by instructing the police to remove Masoga's supporters – and claimed that the election had been invalid and that he remained ANCYL Provincial Chairperson.

In the aftermath, the disciplinary committee of the national ANCYL charged Masoga with several "serious" and "grave" disciplinary offences in respect of the Makhado conference and its aftermath. In July 2010, the committee ruled that he was guilty of provoking division and disunity in the ANCYL, of "engaging in organised factional activity", and of acting in a way "calculated to undermine the effectiveness of the organisation". He was expelled from the ANCYL with immediate effect. Elements of the Limpopo ANCYL refused to recognise the decision, calling the national disciplinary committee a "kangaroo court", and for some time Masoga continued to lead parallel ANCYL structures from a separate office in Polokwane.

== Provincial legislature ==
Masoga failed to gain reinstatement to the ANCYL, though he remained a Member of the Limpopo Provincial Legislature. In October 2011, he was elected deputy chairperson of his local branch of the ANC, the Cuito Cuanavale branch in Flora Park, Polokwane. He reportedly supported incumbent ANC President Jacob Zuma at the party's 53rd National Conference in December 2012.

=== Member of the Executive Council: 2013–2014 ===
In July 2013, Mathale was succeeded as Premier by Stan Mathabatha, who immediately announced a major cabinet reshuffle in which Masoga was appointed Member of the Executive Council (MEC) for Roads and Transport. Masoga denied rumours that he had been appointed to the position because of his support for Zuma. While he was in that office, in November 2013, he was elected Regional Chairperson of the ANC's Peter Mokaba region in Capricorn District.

=== Deputy Speaker: 2014–2019 ===
Masoga vacated his post in the Executive Council after the 2014 general election. He was re-elected to his legislative seat, ranked third on the ANC's provincial party list, but instead of being reappointed as an MEC he was named Deputy Speaker of the Limpopo Provincial Legislature, initially serving under Speaker Merriam Ramadwa.

Early in his tenure as Deputy Speaker, Masoga allegedly incurred a large telephone bill at state expense while on an official trip to the United States in August 2014. City Press reported that Masoga had incurred the bulk of the expenses while watching pornography, though Masoga denied this, saying that the claims were part of a politically motivated smear campaign. In 2015, the opposition Economic Freedom Fighters lodged an official complaint against Masoga with the Public Protector, and the report of the Public Protector's investigation was released in June 2018. Busisiwe Mkhwebane, the incumbent Public Protector, found that Masoga had indeed incurred an "exorbitant or unreasonable" telephone bill of R138,700 while on the official trip; she did not adjudicate the further claim, which Masoga continued to deny, that he had incurred the bill watching pornography. She recommended that Masoga should pay back a portion of the bill. Masoga was cleared of wrongdoing several years later, in July 2022, when the Pretoria High Court declared the Public Protector's report unlawful and invalid.

However, the initial release of the Public Protector's report coincided with Masoga's campaign to succeed Nocks Seabi as Provincial Secretary of the Limpopo ANC. At a party elective conference in June 2018, a fortnight after the Public Protector's report was published, he was defeated in a vote by Soviet Lekganyane, who received 931 votes against Masoga's 618. The same conference nonetheless elected Masoga to a four-year term as an ordinary member of the Limpopo ANC's Provincial Executive Committee.

=== Resignation ===
In the 2019 general election, Masoga was re-elected to his seat in the provincial legislature, ranked 37th on the ANC's party list. However, during the legislature's first session, he was appointed chief executive officer of the Musina-Makhado Special Economic Zone. He resigned from the provincial legislature in order to take up the position, which he retained as of September 2022. He was not re-elected to the ANC Provincial Executive Committee in 2022.
