= Risham Maharaj =

South African politician

Risham Maharaj MPL

Member of the Limpopo Provincial Legislature
- Incumbent
- Assumed office 11 February 2019
- Preceded by: Langa Bodlani

Personal details
- Party: Democratic Alliance
- Spouse: Shikara Maharaj

Risham Maharaj is a South African politician who has been a Member of the Limpopo Provincial Legislature since 2019. He is a member of the Democratic Alliance.

== Political career ==
Maharaj was an active member of the Democratic Alliance in KwaZulu-Natal before he moved to Limpopo. He was the party's provincial managing director in the province before entering the Limpopo Provincial Legislature as a party representative in February 2019; he filled the casual vacancy that arose when Langa Bodlani resigned. He was elected to a full term in the Provincial Legislature during the national and provincial elections held in May 2019.

In 2020, Maharaj supported John Steenhuisen's successful campaign for DA leader.

== Personal life ==
Maharaj is married to Shikara.
