= Tolly Mashamaite =

South African politician (born 1976)

Member of the Limpopo Provincial Legislature
- In office 8 August 2018 – 28 May 2024

Personal details
- Born: Nkholo Victor Mashamaite; 12 September 1976 (age 49)
- Citizenship: South Africa
- Party: African National Congress
- Relations: Jabu Mashamaite (brother)

Nkholo Victor "Tolly" Mashamaite (born 12 September 1976) is a South African politician from Limpopo. He represented the African National Congress (ANC) in the Limpopo Provincial Legislature between August 2018 and May 2024. He served on the ANC Provincial Executive Committee in Limpopo from 2018 to 2022.

Mashamaite served as the provincial legislature's Chairperson of Committees from May 2019 until August 2021, when he was charged with corruption and stepped aside. In 2023 he was additionally charged with murder in a related political assassination case.

== Early life ==
Mashamaite was born on 12 September 1976.

== ANC Waterberg Secretary: 2013–2018 ==
In December 2013, Mashamaite was elected as the Regional Secretary of the ANC's Waterberg regional branch. While he was in that office, in early October 2016, he was arrested and charged in the Mokopane Regional Court; the National Prosecuting Authority alleged that he had raped a woman at a hotel in Mokopone and had subsequently attempted to bribe her R400 to keep quiet about the incident. He was released on R1,000 bail but, at the strong recommendation of the ANC's national leadership and Tripartite Alliance partners, the Limpopo ANC suspended him from his party office. His suspension led to hostility between opposing factions of the party and the ANCs regional offices were ultimately closed indefinitely after a violent confrontation. On 5 December 2016, he was acquitted of the charges against him and was reinstated as ANC Regional Secretary.

In June 2018, Mashamaite was elected to a four-year term as a member of the Provincial Executive Committee of the Limpopo ANC. The following month, he was succeeded as Regional Secretary by Jacob Moabelo.

== Provincial legislature: 2018–2024 ==
On 8 August 2018, Mashamaite was sworn in to the Limpopo Provincial Legislature, filling a casual vacancy created when Soviet Lekganyane resigned to take up a full-time party position as ANC Provincial Secretary. He was appointed to chair the legislature's committee on ethics and members' interests. In the 2019 general election, he was elected to his first full term in the provincial legislature, ranked 19th on the ANC's provincial party list. When the legislature sat for the first time, he was named its Chairperson of Committees ("Chair of Chairs"), with Che Selane as his deputy.

In August 2021, the National Prosecuting Authority announced that Mashamaite faced corruption charges relating to multimillion-rand tender irregularities at the Mogalakwena Local Municipality between 2016 and 2019. He and his co-accused – who included former Mogalakwena Mayor Andrina Matsemela and Mashamaite's brother, Jabu Mashmaite, a Mogalakwena municipal employee – were charged with corruption, money laundering, and conspiracy to commit corruption.

While court proceedings were ongoing, the Limpopo ANC announced that it had removed Mashamaite from the Chairperson of Committees position, demoting him to an ordinary Member of the Provincial Legislature; it said the decision was in line with the national party's step-aside rule. At the provincial party's next elective conference, which occurred in June 2022 while Mashamaite was facing the corruption charges, he was not re-elected to the Provincial Executive Committee.

On 6 March 2023, Mashamaite was arrested in Mokopane. He and several others were accused of involvement in the assassination of local politicians Vaaltyn Kekana and Ralph Kanyane, who had been shot dead in July 2019 after Kekana threatened to blow the whistle on corruption in Mogalakwena Local Municipality. Mashamaite was released on bail, and the ANC said that he would serve the rest of his term in his legislative seat. He lost his seat in the next general election in May 2024.
