= Dieketseng Mashego =

South African politician

Dieketseng Mashego MPL

Member of the Limpopo Executive Council for Public Works, Roads and Infrastructure
- Incumbent
- Assumed office 20 June 2024
- Premier: Phophi Ramathuba
- Preceded by: Phophi Ramathuba

Member of the Limpopo Provincial Legislature
- Incumbent
- Assumed office 14 June 2024

Personal details
- Born: 17 September 1985 (age 41)
- Party: African National Congress
- Profession: Politician

Dieketseng Masesi Mashego (born 17 September 1985) is a South African politician from Limpopo. A member of the African National Congress (ANC), she has been Limpopo's Member of the Executive Council (MEC) for Health since June 2024.

== Life and career ==
Mashego was born on 17 September 1985. She was active in the leadership of the ANC's regional branch in Sekhukhune and represented the party as a councillor in the Elias Motsoaledi Local Municipality, where she was also speaker of the council.

In the May 2024 general election, Mashego was elected to represent the ANC in the Limpopo Provincial Legislature, ranked thirteenth on the provincial party list. She was also appointed to the provincial government: announcing her new Executive Council on 18 June 2024, newly elected Premier Phophi Ramathuba named Rachoene as Member of the Executive Council (MEC) for Health, the office that Ramathuba had recently vacated.
