= Makoma Makhurupetje =

South African politician

Makoma Makhurupetje MPL

Speaker of the Limpopo Provincial Legislature
- Incumbent
- Assumed office 14 June 2024
- Premier: Phophi Ramathuba
- Preceded by: Rosemary Molapo

Member of the Limpopo Provincial Legislature
- Incumbent
- Assumed office 21 May 2014

Member of the Limpopo Executive Council for Transport and Community Safety
- In office October 2017 – May 2019
- Premier: Stan Mathabatha
- Preceded by: Nandi Ndalane
- Succeeded by: Dickson Masemola

Member of the Limpopo Executive Council for Cooperative Governance, Human Settlements and Traditional Affairs
- In office May 2014 – October 2017
- Premier: Stan Mathabatha
- Preceded by: Ishmael Kgetjepe (for Human Settlements)
- Succeeded by: Jerry Ndou

Deputy Provincial Secretary of the African National Congress in Limpopo
- In office February 2014 – June 2018
- Chairperson: Stan Mathabatha
- Secretary: Nocks Seabi
- Preceded by: Florence Radzilani
- Succeeded by: Basikopo Makamu

Personal details
- Citizenship: South Africa
- Party: African National Congress

Dr Makoma Grace Makhurupetje is a South African politician who has been the Speaker of the Limpopo Provincial Legislature since 2024. She has represented the African National Congress (ANC) in the provincial legislature since 2014. She formerly served as Limpopo's Member of the Executive Council (MEC) for Transport and Community Safety from 2017 to 2019 and as MEC for Cooperative Governance, Human Settlements and Traditional Affairs from 2014 to 2017. From 2014 to 2018, she was the Deputy Provincial Secretary of the ANC's Limpopo branch.

== Life and career ==
At a party elective conference in February 2014, Makhurupetje was elected to a four-year term as Deputy Provincial Secretary of the ANC's Limpopo branch, serving under Provincial Secretary Nocks Seabi and Provincial Chairperson Stan Mathabatha. Shortly afterwards, she appeared on the ANC's provincial party list in the 2014 general election, ranked 15th, and she was elected to a seat in the Limpopo Provincial Legislature. In the same election, Mathabatha was elected to his first full term as Premier of Limpopo and he appointed Makhurupetje to the Limpopo Executive Council as MEC for Cooperative Governance, Human Settlements and Traditional Affairs.

In October 2017, Mathabatha announced a reshuffle in which Makhurupetje was moved to the less influential Transport and Community Safety portfolio. The provincial ANC Youth League and other critics of Mathabatha linked Makhurupetje's demotion to her support for Nkosazana Dlamini-Zuma ahead of the ANC's 54th National Conference; while Makhurupetje and Nocks Seabi were viewed as key supporters of Dlamini-Zuma's campaign to become ANC President, Mathabatha supported the opposing candidate, Cyril Ramaphosa. Ramaphosa prevailed and, at the provincial party's next elective conference in June 2018, Makhurupetje unexpectedly did not stand for re-election as ANC Deputy Provincial Secretary. However, she was elected as an ordinary member of the Limpopo ANC's Provincial Executive Committee.

She remained in her position as MEC for Transport and Community Safety until the 2019 general election. In the election, she was re-elected to her legislative seat, ranked 20th on the ANC's list, but Mathabatha dropped her from his second-term Executive Council. In 2022, she was re-elected to the ANC Provincial Executive Committee; by popularity, she was ranked second of the 30 candidates elected, with only Phophi Ramathuba receiving more votes than her.

Following the 2024 general election, Makhurupetje was elected speaker of the provincial legislature.
