= Nocks Seabi =

South African politician

The Honourable Nocks Seabi MP

Member of the National Assembly
- Incumbent
- Assumed office 30 July 2018
- Constituency: Limpopo (since 2019)

Chairperson of the Portfolio Committee on Police
- In office 6 September 2023 – 28 May 2024
- Minister: Bheki Cele
- Preceded by: Tina Joemat-Pettersson
- Succeeded by: Ian Cameron

Provincial Secretary of the Limpopo African National Congress
- In office February 2014 – June 2018
- Deputy: Makoma Makhurupetje
- Chairperson: Stan Mathabatha
- Preceded by: Soviet Lekganyane
- Succeeded by: Soviet Lekganyane

Personal details
- Born: Albert Mammoga Seabi; 21 September 1962 (age 63)
- Citizenship: South African
- Party: African National Congress

Albert Mammoga "Nocks" Seabi (born 21 September 1962) is a South African politician from Limpopo. He has represented the African National Congress (ANC) in the National Assembly of South Africa since July 2018.

Before he joined the National Assembly, Seabi was the provincial secretary of the Limpopo ANC between February 2014 and June 2018. He was the chairperson of the Portfolio Committee on Police from September 2023 to May 2024.

== Early life and career ==
Seabi was born on 21 September 1962. He rose to political prominence as a member of the African National Congress (ANC) in Limpopo.

He was appointed as the chief executive officer of the Limpopo Tourism Agency in 2012, but in October 2013 he was suspended with full pay pending an investigation into his alleged non-compliance with the Public Finance Management Act.

== ANC Provincial Secretary: 2014–2018 ==
In mid-February 2014, while still suspended from his job at the Limpopo Tourism Agency, Seabi attended the ANC's provincial elective conference at Turfloop, where he was elected as provincial secretary of the Limpopo branch of the ANC. He served under provincial chairperson Stan Mathabatha and was deputised by Makoma Makhurupetje. In his capacity as provincial secretary, he joined a 2015 political study tour to Shanghai, China, where the ANC delegation visited the Chinese Communist Party's China Executive Leadership Academy.

During his four-year term as provincial secretary, Seabi was accused on several occasions of using his administrative powers to interfere in internal elective processes. In December 2014, allegations of this kind led a group of ANC members, wearing panties on their heads, to chase Seabi out of a provincial conference of the ANC Women's League; on that occasion he was accused of manipulating the electoral process in favour of Joy Matshoge, who was standing against Maite Marutha for election as Women's League provincial chairperson. In November 2016, ANC members protested outside Seabi's office in connection with an upcoming election for the regional ANC leadership in Waterberg.

Seabi was viewed of a strong political supporter both of Jacob Zuma and of Nkosazana Dlamini-Zuma. Ahead of the ANC's 54th National Conference in December 2017, he was accused of manipulating processes to favour Dlamini-Zuma's presidential bid, including by rigging votes that should in fact have gone to Dlamini-Zuma's opponent, Cyril Ramaphosa. These allegations led the provincial leadership of the Congress of South African Trade Unions to call for Seabi's suspension and an investigation.

Meanwhile, the provincial party was preparing for its own elective conference, and Seabi had long been expected to lead a challenge to incumbent provincial chairperson Stan Mathabatha. As the provincial conference approached, he was reported to be standing for election as provincial treasurer. However, when the conference was held in Polokwane in June 2018, Seabi was not elected to a top leadership position, nor even elected as an ordinary member of the Provincial Executive Committee; he was succeeded as provincial secretary by Soviet Lekganyane.

== National Assembly: 2018–present ==
On 30 July 2018, Seabi was sworn in to an ANC seat in the National Assembly, the lower house of the South African Parliament. He filled the casual vacancy caused by Winnie Madikizela-Mandela's death. For the remainder of the Fifth Parliament, Seabi was a member of the Portfolio Committee on Transport.

In the May 2019 general election, he was elected to a full term in his seat, now as a member of the Limpopo caucus of the National Assembly. After the election, the ANC announced that it would appoint Seabi as its whip in the new Portfolio Committee on Sports, Arts and Culture, chaired by Beauty Dlulane. In late August 2021, he was transferred from the sport committee to the Portfolio Committee on Police, where he also served as ANC whip. The committee's chairperson, Tina Joemat-Pettersson, died in June 2023, and on 6 September 2023 he was formally elected to replace her as chairperson.

In the next general election in May 2024, Seabi was re-elected to his seat in the National Assembly, ranked 14th on the ANC's party list for Limpopo.
