= Katlego Phala =

South African politician

Katlego Suzan Phala MPL

Member of the Limpopo Provincial Legislature
- In office 21 May 2014 – 28 May 2024

Personal details
- Born: Katlego Suzan Phala c. 1992 Mankweng, Transvaal Province, South Africa
- Party: Democratic Alliance
- Occupation: Member & DA Whip in the Limpopo Provincial Legislature
- Profession: Politician

Katlego Suzan Phala (born c. 1992) is a South African politician serving as a Member of the Limpopo Provincial Legislature for the Democratic Alliance. Phala was elected to the provincial legislature at the age of 22 in May 2014. She consequently became the youngest Member of the Provincial Legislature elected nationwide in that year's general election. Phala was re-elected in the May 2019 general election until May 2024.

== Early life and education ==
Phala was born in 1992 in Mankweng outside Polokwane. She was raised by her mother, Violet Phala. She matriculated from Mountain View High School in 2010. In 2014, Phala announced that she was studying for a degree in public relations management from the University of South Africa.

== Political career ==
Phala became a member of the Democratic Alliance in June 2012, where she established a party branch in Mankweng. She remained actively involved in the party until May 2024, when her term concluded following the party's decision not to retain her. For the 2014 general election, Phala was placed third on the party's list for the Limpopo Provincial Legislature. She was elected as the DA won three seats. Her election made history since she was only 22 years old at the time, making her the youngest member of the provincial legislature elected countrywide in that year's general election.

Phala was re-elected to a second term in May 2019. She took office on 22 May 2019 with her term ending on 28 May 2024
