= Shahidabibi Shaikh =

South African politician

Shahidabibi Shaikh MP

Permanent Delegate to the National Council of Provinces from Limpopo
- Incumbent
- Assumed office 23 May 2019

Member of the Limpopo Provincial Legislature
- In office 21 May 2014 – 7 May 2019

Personal details
- Party: African National Congress
- Profession: Politician

Shahidabibi Shaikh is a South African politician who has been the Chairperson of the Select Committee on Security and Justice in the National Council of Provinces since 2019. A member of the African National Congress, she has been a permanent delegate to the NCOP from Limpopo since 2019. Shaikh had previously served in the Limpopo Provincial Legislature from 2014 to 2019.

== Education ==
Shaikh holds a Bachelor of Science and an Honours degree in General Physiology and two postgraduate diplomas in science and management, respectively. She also has a Masters in Management in Public and Development Management.

== Political career ==
Shaikh was a branch secretary for the African National Congress Youth League and served on the organisation's Provincial Executive Committee. She served on a Branch Executive Committee and the Provincial Executive Committee of the African National Congress.

In 2014 Shaikh stood for election to the Limpopo Provincial Legislature, ranked 17th on the ANC list. She gained election to a seat in the provincial legislature as the ANC won 39 seats. She was a member of the social development, treasury, provincial administration, sports, arts and culture, oversight mechanism, and quality of life committees during her tenure in the provincial legislature.

=== National Council of Provinces ===
Shaikh unsuccessfully stood for re-election to the provincial legislature in the 2019 general election, however, after the election she was selected by the ANC to become a Permanent Delegate to the National Council of Provinces from Limpopo. Shortly afterwards, Shaikh was selected by the ANC to become the Chairperson of the Select Committee on Security and Justice; she was elected unopposed on 26 June 2019.

On the Select Committee adopting its report on the Protection of Constitutional Democracy against Terrorist and Related Activities Amendment Bill to prevent South Africa from being greylisted in December 2022, Shaikh said that they were aware of the "dire consequences" of South Africa being greylisted and the processing of the bill timeously.
