= Joe Maswanganyi =

South African politician (born 1966)

The Honourable Joe Maswanganyi MP

Minister of Transport
- In office 31 March 2017 – 26 February 2018
- President: Jacob Zuma
- Deputy: Sindisiwe Chikunga
- Preceded by: Dipuo Peters
- Succeeded by: Blade Nzimande

Member of the National Assembly
- Incumbent
- Assumed office 27 May 2015

Provincial Secretary of the Limpopo African National Congress
- In office July 2008 – December 2011
- Deputy: Pinky Kekana
- Chairperson: Cassel Mathale
- Preceded by: Cassel Mathale
- Succeeded by: Soviet Lekganyane

Deputy President of the African National Congress Youth League
- In office March 1998 – April 2001
- President: Malusi Gigaba
- Succeeded by: Rubben Mohlaloga

Member of the Limpopo Provincial Legislature
- In office 1997–2014

Personal details
- Born: Mkhacani Joseph Maswanganyi; 14 April 1966 (age 60) Giyani, Transvaal; South Africa
- Party: African National Congress
- Education: University of South Africa; University of the Free State; University of Venda

Mkhacani Joseph Maswanganyi (born 14 April 1966) is a South African politician from Limpopo Province. He represents the African National Congress (ANC) in the National Assembly, where he is the chairperson of the Standing Committee on Finance. He was formerly the Minister of Transport from March 2017 to February 2018.

A teacher by training, Maswanganyi served in the Limpopo Provincial Legislature before he joined the National Assembly in May 2015. He was a Member of the Limpopo Executive Council under Premiers Ngoako Ramatlhodi and Sello Moloto. On 31 March 2017, after two years as a backbencher, Maswaganyi was promoted to Minister of Transport in the second cabinet of President Jacob Zuma. Zuma's successor, President Cyril Ramaphosa, sacked him from the cabinet in February 2018, whereafter he chaired the Portfolio Committee on Transport until he was elected to his current committee chairmanship after the 2019 general election.

During his tenure in the provincial legislature, Maswanganyi was the Deputy President of the ANC Youth League from 1998 to 2001 under league president Malusi Gigaba. After that, he was a member of the ANC Provincial Executive Committee in Limpopo, where he served as ANC Provincial Secretary from July 2008 to December 2011. He has been a member of the ANC National Executive Committee since December 2017.

== Early life and education ==
Maswanganyi was born on 14 April 1966 in Giyani in the former Transvaal. He grew up in Mudabula, a village in nearby Malamulele. After matriculating in 1988, he trained as a teacher. Later, after the end of apartheid, he completed a Bachelor of Arts from the University of South Africa in 2000, a Master's degree in governance and political transformation from the University of the Free State in 2006, and a second Master's degree in political science from the University of Venda in 2016.

Maswanganyi worked as a teacher until 1994, when he entered politics full-time. He was the chairperson of the Public Works Commission in 1997.

== Limpopo Provincial Legislature: 1997–2014 ==
From 1997 to 2014, Maswanganyi represented his political party, the African National Congress (ANC), in the Limpopo Provincial Legislature. During his first term in the legislature, he was also the national deputy president of the ANC Youth League, deputising Malusi Gigaba; he was succeeded by Rubben Mohlaloga in April 2001, when he stepped down due to having passed the league's 35-year age limit.

=== Member of the Executive Council ===
After serving in several committees in the legislature, Maswanganyi was appointed to the Executive Council of Limpopo under Premier Ngoako Ramatlhodi, who appointed him as Member of the Executive Council (MEC) for Local Government and Housing. In this capacity, in early 2002, Maswanganyi became the figurehead of a government campaign to change the names of major cities in the province, including by renaming the capital, Pietersburg, as Polokwane. Maswanganyi said the current names were "a sad reminder of a history of oppressive colonial practices". The opposition Freedom Front said that it would protest the scheme through civil disobedience by withholding municipal property taxes.

In 2004, Maswanganyi was moved to a new portfolio as MEC for Sports, Arts and Culture in 2004. He was sacked from that position in November 2006 in a reshuffle by Ramatlhodi's successor, Premier Sello Moloto. He was succeeded by Joyce Mashamba, who hailed him for having "unified the nation" during his time in the portfolio. Moloto subsequently denied that Maswanganyi's dismissal was part of a "purge" of his opponents; instead, he said that Maswanganyi had followed improper procedure in employing about 200 community development workers.

=== ANC Provincial Secretary ===
On 20 July 2008, at a provincial party elective conference at the University of Venda, Maswanganyi was elected to the influential position of Provincial Secretary of the Limpopo branch of the ANC. He served under newly elected Provincial Chairperson Cassel Mathale, and Pinky Kekana was elected as his deputy. Although Maswanganyi, Mathale, and other top leaders were perceived, at the time of their election, as united in their support for ANC president Jacob Zuma, Mathale later fell out with Zuma, while Maswanganyi remained a supporter.

At the party's next provincial elective conference in December 2011, Maswanganyi stood for re-election on a slate of candidates aligned to Joe Phaahla, who sought to unseat Mathale from the chairmanship at the same conference. However, he was defeated by Soviet Lekganyane, who received 601 votes to Maswanganyi's 517.

== National Assembly: 2015–present ==
On 27 May 2015, Maswanganyi was sworn in to the National Assembly, the lower house of the South African Parliament. He filled the seat that had been vacated when Collins Chabane died. During his first two years in the assembly, Maswanganyi was a backbencher, serving on the Portfolio Committee on Transport and the Standing Committee on the Auditor-General.

=== Minister of Transport ===
Just after midnight in the early hours of 31 March 2017, President Zuma announced a controversial cabinet reshuffle in which Maswanganyi was appointed to replace Dipuo Peters as Minister of Transport. His deputy was Sindisiwe Chikunga. In the immediate aftermath of the announcement, the national Automobile Association expressed concern about Peters's abrupt and unexplained dismissal. However, the Mail & Guardian was less surprised by Maswanganyi's promotion, noting that the ANC Youth League and Limpopo ANC had "long punted him for a position in the cabinet"; indeed, the newspaper said that he "may hold the record as the politician who has been most often tipped to be elevated to high office only to be passed over time and again".

By the end of the year, the Mail & Guardian said that Maswanganyi appeared still "to be searching for his bearings" in the ministry. During the same period, he received media coverage for undertaking to appoint Dudu Myeni, the controversial former chairperson of South African Airways, as a special adviser in his office; defending the appointment, he told the Sunday Times that he "needed someone with aviation experience".

At the ANC's 54th National Conference at Nasrec in December 2017, Maswanganyi was elected to a five-year term as a member of the party's National Executive Committee. By number of votes received, he was ranked 49th of the 80 ordinary members elected to the committee. However, ahead of the conference, he backed the losing presidential candidate: he was viewed as a key Limpopo lobbyist of Zuma's preferred successor, Nkosazana Dlamini-Zuma, who was beaten at the conference by Deputy President Cyril Ramaphosa.

In February 2018, Ramaphosa was further elected to succeed Zuma as President of South Africa. In his first cabinet reshuffle, announced on 26 February, he sacked Maswanganyi, replacing him with Blade Nzimande. Maswanganyi remained in the National Assembly as an ordinary Member of Parliament.

=== Committee chairperson ===
On 30 May 2018, ANC Chief Whip Jackson Mthembu announced that the party would nominate Maswanganyi to chair Parliament's Portfolio Committee on Public Service and Administration. He was formally elected to the position at a committee meeting later the same day. He succeeded Mathale, his former rival, whom Ramaphosa had appointed as a deputy minister.

In the 2019 general election, Maswanganyi was comfortably re-elected to the National Assembly, ranked 21st on the ANC's national party list. After the election, the ANC announced that it would nominate him to chair the Standing Committee on Finance; he was formally elected, unopposed, on 2 July 2019. After his election, he told press that he would seek to ensure that longstanding investigations into misconduct at Steinhoff and VBS Mutual Bank would "reach a conclusion" during his tenure in the chair.

At the ANC's next national conference in December 2022, he was re-elected to the National Executive Committee, ranked 39th; he received 1,317 votes across about 4,000 ballots.
