= Rebecca Seono =

South African politician

Rebecca Seono MPL

Member of the Limpopo Provincial Legislature
- Incumbent
- Assumed office 22 May 2019

Personal details
- Citizenship: South Africa
- Party: African National Congress

Mmaishibe Rebecca Seono is a South African politician who has represented the African National Congress (ANC) in the Limpopo Provincial Legislature since 2019. She was elected to her seat in the 2019 general election, ranked 38th on the ANC's party list. She chairs the legislature's portfolio committee on transport and community safety.
