= Violet Mathye =

South African politician (born 1967)

Violet Mathye MPL

Member of the Limpopo Executive Council for Transport and Community Safety
- In office 20 June 2024 – 2 September 2026
- Premier: Phophi Ramathuba
- Preceded by: Florence Radzilani

Member of the Limpopo Provincial Legislature
- Incumbent
- Assumed office 21 May 2014

Personal details
- Born: 12 September 1967 (age 59)
- Citizenship: South Africa
- Party: African National Congress

Susani Violet Mathye (born 12 November 1967) is a South African politician who has represented the African National Congress (ANC) in the Limpopo Provincial Legislature since 2014. She was first elected to the provincial legislature in the 2014 general election, ranked 26th on the ANC's provincial party list. She was ranked 14th upon her re-election in the 2019 general election.

Simultaneously, Mathye served as Regional Deputy Chairperson of the ANC's branch in Mopani between 2013 and 2021. She was elected comfortably to the position in November 2013, beating Norman Machete with 102 votes against Machete's 66, and she was re-elected in September 2017. She deputised Regional Chairpersons Seaparo Sekoati (from 2013 to 2017) and Pule Shayi from (2017 to 2021). At the party's next regional elective conference in June 2021, Mathye did not stand for re-election and was succeeded by Gerson Molapisane. She was also elected to two consecutive four-year terms on the Limpopo ANC's Provincial Executive Committee in June 2018 and June 2022.

Having been re-elected to the Provincial Legislature in the 2024 general election, Mathye was named to the Limpopo Executive Council; her portfolio being Transport and Community Safety.
