= Jerry Ndou =

South African politician

Delegate to the National Council of Provinces
- Incumbent
- Assumed office 6 October 2022
- Constituency: Limpopo

Member of the Limpopo Provincial Legislature
- In office 21 May 2014 – 6 October 2022

Member of the Limpopo Executive Council for Cooperative Governance, Human Settlement and Traditional Affairs
- In office October 2017 – May 2019
- Premier: Stan Mathabatha
- Preceded by: Makoma Makhurupetje
- Succeeded by: Basikopo Makamu

Member of the Limpopo Executive Council for Public Works, Roads and Infrastructure
- In office May 2014 – October 2017
- Premier: Stan Mathabatha
- Preceded by: Dickson Masemola (for Public Works)
- Succeeded by: Nandi Ndalane

Deputy Provincial Chairperson of the African National Congress in Limpopo
- In office February 2014 – June 2018
- Chairperson: Stan Mathabatha
- Preceded by: Dickson Masemola
- Succeeded by: Florence Radzilani

Personal details
- Born: Azwindini Jeremiah Dingaa Ndou
- Party: African National Congress

Azwindini Jeremiah "Jerry" Ndou is a South African politician and diplomat who has served as a Delegate to the National Council of Provinces (NCOP) since October 2022. Before that, he represented the African National Congress (ANC) in the Limpopo Provincial Legislature and Limpopo Executive Council.

Formerly an activist in the ANC Youth League, Ndou was a Member of Parliament in South Africa's first democratic Parliament from 1994 to 1999. Between 1999 and 2014, he held diplomatic posts as South African High Commissioner to Zimbabwe, Ambassador to Libya, and Ambassador to Ireland. In early 2014 he was elected Deputy Provincial Chairperson of the ANC in Limpopo, and pursuant to the 2014 general election he became a Member of the Limpopo Provincial Legislature. Stan Mathabatha, then the Premier of Limpopo, appointed him Member of the Executive Council (MEC) for Public Works, Roads and Infrastructure (2014–2017) and MEC for Cooperative Governance, Human Settlement and Traditional Affairs (2017–2019).

Ndou failed to gain re-election as ANC Deputy Chairperson in 2018 but was re-elected to his legislative seat in the 2019 general election and became Deputy Speaker of the Limpopo Provincial Legislature. He left that office, and the provincial legislature, in October 2022, when he filled a casual vacancy in the NCOP.

== Early life and activism ==
Ndou was active in South African student and youth politics during apartheid and served as the president of the student representative council while at the University of Venda in present-day Limpopo province. He was later elected to the National Executive Committee of the African National Congress (ANC) Youth League and served as the league's secretary for international affairs.

== Parliamentary and diplomatic career ==
In South Africa's first post-apartheid elections in 1994, Ndou was elected as a Member of Parliament, representing the ANC. In June 1999, after the 1999 general election, he was appointed as the South African High Commissioner to Zimbabwe, succeeding Kingsley Mamabolo. In his early years in the diplomatic post, Ndou also held key positions inside the Limpopo branch of the ANC, first as ANC Provincial Treasurer from 1996, under Provincial Chairperson George Mashamba, and then as ANC Deputy Provincial Secretary from 1998, under Provincial Chairperson Ngoako Ramatlhodi and Provincial Secretary Benny Boshielo.

He served in his post in Harare until 2005 and during that time served as a mediator in talks between Zimbabwe's ruling ZANU-PF and the opposition Movement for Democratic Change. He vacated the High Commission in mid-2005 to prepare for reassignment and was replaced by Mlungisi Makalima. Later in 2005 he was appointed as the South African High Commissioner to Libya.

In 2008, while Ndou was still in Libya, the Mail & Guardian reported that Ndou was poised to make a domestic political comeback, as supporters of Sello Moloto, the ANC Provincial Chairperson in Limpopo, began to lobby for Ndou's election as Moloto's deputy in the party. Sources told the newspaper that Moloto and his supporters would seek to position Ndou as their candidate to succeed Moloto as the Premier of Limpopo, a compromise which would strengthen Moloto's slate. However, when the party's provincial elective conference was held, Ndou did not run for the Deputy Chairperson position.

Ndou's final diplomatic posting was as a South African Ambassador to Ireland, where he was installed by late 2011.

== Career in provincial government ==
=== ANC Deputy Chairperson: 2014–2018 ===
In February 2014, at the party's provincial elective conference, Ndou was elected as Deputy Provincial Chairperson of the Limpopo ANC, serving under newly elected Provincial Chairperson Stanley Mathabatha. Ndou reportedly had a particularly strong political base in Limpopo's Vhembe region. In his later years in the party office, he – along with Mathabatha – was viewed as a strong supporter of ANC Deputy President Cyril Ramaphosa and Ramaphosa's campaign to succeed President Jacob Zuma.

=== Member of the Executive Council: 2014–2019 ===
In the 2014 general election, Ndou was listed 12th on the ANC's party list for the provincial election; he was elected to a seat in the Limpopo Provincial Legislature. He also ascended to the Limpopo Executive Council, appointed by Mathabatha in his capacity as Limpopo Premier; he served as Member of the Executive Council (MEC) for Public Works, Roads and Infrastructure, a newly created portfolio. In 2015, he served simultaneously as acting MEC for Education after the death of the incumbent, Thembisile Nwedamutswu.

In October 2017, in a cabinet reshuffle by Mathabatha, Ndou was appointed MEC for Cooperative Governance, Human Settlement and Traditional Affairs. This was viewed as a promotion for Ndou and, since he replaced a Zuma loyalist (Makoma Makhurupetje), was linked to Ndou's support for Ramaphosa ahead of the ANC's upcoming 54th National Conference.

In 2018, as the end of Ndou's term as ANC Deputy Chairperson approached, City Press reported that Mathabatha had fallen out with Ndou and increasingly preferred Florence Radzilani as his deputy. At the Limpopo ANC's next provincial conference in June 2018, Radzilani ran to succeed Ndou and narrowly beat him in a vote, earning 791 votes to Ndou's 752. However, Ndou was elected to a four-year term as an ordinary member of the Limpopo ANC's Provincial Executive Committee and he served the remainder of his term in the Executive Council.

=== Deputy Speaker: 2019–2022 ===
In the 2019 general election, Ndou was re-elected to his seat in the provincial legislature, ranked 27th on the ANC's party list. He was not reappointed to Mathabatha's Executive Council but instead was elected Deputy Speaker of the Limpopo Provincial Legislature, deputising Mavhungu Lerule-Ramakhanya. In October 2022, in a reshuffle of the Limpopo government by Mathabatha, Ndou was succeeded as Deputy Speaker by Tshitereke Matibe.

== Return to national government ==
Immediately after he was removed as Deputy Speaker in October 2022, Ndou was "re-deployed" as a member of the Limpopo delegation to the National Council of Provinces (NCOP), the upper house of the national Parliament. He and Dickson Masemola filled the vacancies in the NCOP left by the departures of Tebogo Mamorobela and Lilliet Mamaregane.
