= Nakedi Lekganyane =

South African politician

Nakedi Lekganyane MPL

Member of the Limpopo Provincial Legislature
- Incumbent
- Assumed office 22 May 2019

Personal details
- Citizenship: South Africa
- Party: African National Congress

Nakedi Maria Lekganyane is a South African politician who has represented the African National Congress (ANC) in the Limpopo Provincial Legislature since 2019. She was elected to her seat in the 2019 general election, ranked tenth on the ANC's party list.

Lekganyane formerly represented the ANC as a councillor in Capricorn District Municipality. She was first elected to the Capricorn Mayoral Committee in 2010 and was elected the council's Speaker after the 2016 local elections, serving under Mayor John Mpe. She resigned from the council after the 2019 election and was succeeded as Speaker by Monica Mohale.
