= Tshitereke Matibe =

South African politician (born 1969)

Tshitereke Matibe MPL

Member of the Limpopo Executive Council for Economic Development, Environment and Tourism
- Incumbent
- Assumed office 20 June 2024
- Premier: Phophi Ramathuba
- Preceded by: Rodgers Monama

Member of the Limpopo Provincial Legislature
- Incumbent
- Assumed office 20 January 2022

Delegate to the National Council of Provinces
- In office 23 May 2019 – January 2022
- Constituency: Limpopo

Executive Mayor of Vhembe
- In office June 2012 – August 2016
- Preceded by: Florence Radzilani
- Succeeded by: Florence Radzilani

Personal details
- Born: 19 November 1969 (age 56)
- Citizenship: South Africa
- Party: African National Congress

Tshitereke Baldwin Matibe (born 19 November 1969) is a South African politician who has been the Member of the Limpopo Executive Council for Economic Development, Environment and Tourism since 2024. He served as Deputy Speaker of the Limpopo Provincial Legislature from October 2022 until June 2024. A member of the African National Congress (ANC), he was sworn in to the provincial legislature in January 2022 after serving in the National Council of Provinces since 2019. Before that, he was the Executive Mayor of Vhembe District Municipality from June 2012 to August 2016, and he has chaired the ANC's regional branch in Vhembe since 2012.

== Education and early career ==
From 1987 to 1990, Matibe attended the University of Venda, where he completed a Bachelor of Arts in education. In the 1990s, he was a steward in the South African Democratic Teachers Union. At the same time, beginning in the early 1990s, he rose through the local and regional ranks of the ANC in Limpopo, holding leadership roles in his local party branch and the Mutale subregional branch. In 2010, he was elected chairperson of the latter. He also served a stint as Mayor of Mutale Local Municipality.

In May 2012, while still Mutale chairperson, Matibe was elected Regional Chairperson of the ANC's branch in Vhembe. He defeated the incumbent, Falaza Mdaka, to take the position, earning 177 votes against Mdaka's 143. Nandi Ndalane was elected as his deputy. Weeks later, on 12 June 2012, Matibe was sworn in as Executive Mayor of Vhembe District Municipality. He succeeded Florence Radzilani, who had been appointed to the Limpopo Executive Council. He remained in the mayoral office until the 2016 local elections, when Radzilani returned to replace him. The following year, at a party elective conference in July 2017, he narrowly defeated Makonde Mathivha to retain his party office as ANC Regional Chairperson, receiving 161 votes against Mathivha's 153.

== Legislative career ==
In the 2019 general election, Matibe was elected as a Delegate to the National Council of Provinces (NCOP), ranked 47th on the ANC's provincial party list for Limpopo. While in the NCOP he served as the whip for the caucus of ANC delegates representing Limpopo. In December 2021, he was re-elected as ANC Regional Chairperson in Vhembe, beating Dowelani Nenguda, the incumbent Mayor of Vhembe and Matibe's outgoing deputy, with 204 votes to Nenguda's 174.

In January 2022, the ANC announced that Matibe would be moved to the Limpopo Provincial Legislature to fill a casual vacancy arising from the resignation of Goodman Mtileni; he was sworn in as a Member of the Provincial Legislature on 20 January. In October of that year, the party named Matibe as the new Deputy Speaker of the Limpopo Provincial Legislature; he succeeded Jerry Ndou, who was sworn in to the NCOP. Ahead of the ANC's 55th National Conference in December that year, Matibe was an outspoken supporter of incumbent ANC President Cyril Ramaphosa.

In June 2024, Matibe was named to the Executive Council of Premier Phophi Ramathuba as the Member of the Executive Council responsible for the Economic Development, Environment and Tourism portfolio.
