= Polly Boshielo =

South African politician

Polly Boshielo MP

Member of the National Assembly of South Africa
- In office 21 May 2014 – 5 June 2015
- Incumbent
- Assumed office 3 July 2024

Deputy Minister of Police
- Incumbent
- Assumed office 3 July 2024
- President: Cyril Ramaphosa

Limpopo MEC for Transport, Safety and Liaison
- In office 29 June 2022 – 6 October 2022
- Premier: Stanley Mathabatha
- Preceded by: Mavhungu Lerule-Ramakhanya
- Succeeded by: Florence Radzilani

Limpopo MEC for Education
- In office 22 May 2019 – 29 June 2022
- Premier: Stanley Mathabatha
- Preceded by: Ishmael Kgetjepe
- Succeeded by: Mavhungu Lerule-Ramakhanya

Speaker of the Limpopo Provincial Legislature
- In office 15 October 2015 – 7 May 2019
- Preceded by: Mirriam Ramadwa
- Succeeded by: Mavhungu Lerule-Ramakhanya

Member of the Limpopo Provincial Legislature
- In office June 2015 – 6 October 2022

Personal details
- Born: Seshego, Transvaal Province, South Africa
- Party: African National Congress
- Other political affiliations: South African Communist Party
- Spouse: Benny Boshielo
- Occupation: Member of the National Assembly
- Profession: Politician

Shela Paulina "Polly" Boshielo is a South African politician who has been the Deputy Minister of Police since 3 July 2024. She was the Limpopo MEC for Transport, Safety and Liaison from 29 June 2022 to 6 October 2022. She has been a Member of the Limpopo Provincial Legislature for the African National Congress since June 2015 to 2024. She served as the speaker of the provincial legislature from October 2015 to May 2019 and as the MEC for Education from May 2019 to June 2022. Boshielo also served as a Member of the National Assembly from May 2014 to June 2015, and again from 3 July 2024.

== Early life ==
Boshielo was born and grew up in Seshego, a township of Polokwane.

== Political career ==
Boshielo joined both the African National Congress and South African Communist Party. After the 2014 general election held on 7 May, Boshielo was nominated to the National Assembly. She was sworn in as an MP on 21 May 2014. In June 2014, she received her committee assignments. She was a member of the auditor-general, transport, and public enterprises committees. Boshielo resigned from Parliament on 5 June 2015.

Also in June, she was sworn in as a Member of the Limpopo Provincial Legislature. She was elected speaker of the legislature on 13 October, succeeding Mirriam Ramadwa, who had initially refused to resign. Boshielo was formally sworn in on 15 October.

After the 2019 provincial election that was held on 8 May, Mavhungu Lerule-Ramakhanya was elected speaker of the provincial legislature on 22 May 2019. On that same day, premier Stanley Mathabatha appointed Boshielo Member of the Executive Council for Education. She was sworn in later that same day. The provincial SADTU welcomed her appointment. During her tenure as Education MEC, Limpopo was the worst-performing province in the country in the 2021 matric results. Boshielo was unfazed by this, responding to criticism by blaming the COVID-19 pandemic.

On 29 June 2022, Mathabatha conducted a cabinet reshuffle, in which he announced that Boshielo and the MEC for Transport, Safety and Liaison, Mavhungu Lerule-Ramakhanya would exchange positions.

== Personal life ==
Boshielo is married to Benny.
