= Rosemary Molapo =

South African politician

Rosemary Molapo MPL

Speaker of the Limpopo Provincial Legislature
- In office 16 July 2020 – 28 May 2024
- Deputy: Jerry Ndou; Tshitereke Matibe
- Preceded by: Mavhungu Lerule-Ramakhanya
- Succeeded by: Makoma Makhurupetje

Member of the Limpopo Provincial Legislature
- Incumbent
- Assumed office 21 May 2014

Personal details
- Party: African National Congress
- Education: University of the North

Reneiloe Rosemary Molapo is a South African politician who served as Speaker of the Limpopo Provincial Legislature from July 2020 until May 2024. She represented the African National Congress (ANC) in the provincial legislature from 2014 until 2024.

Molapo has a Bachelor of Arts degree and a higher education diploma from the University of the North in present-day Limpopo province. She was formerly the director of strategic planning at Fetakgomo Tubatse Local Municipality in Limpopo. She was first elected as a Member of the Provincial Legislature in the 2014 general election, when she was ranked 24th on the ANC's provincial party list. In the 2019 general election, she was ranked 36th on the ANC's party list and was re-elected to her seat. In July 2019, was appointed Deputy Chief Whip of the Majority Party, the ANC, in the provincial legislature, serving under Chief Whip Essob Mokgonyana. She was also a local steward of the Commonwealth Parliamentary Association.

On 16 July 2020, Molapo was sworn in as Speaker of the Limpopo Provincial Legislature, replacing Mavhungu Lerule-Ramakhanya, who had been appointed to the Limpopo Executive Council earlier that year.
