= Messina Masekoameng =

South African politician

Messina Masekoameng MPL

Member of the Limpopo Provincial Legislature
- Incumbent
- Assumed office 21 May 2014

Personal details
- Citizenship: South Africa
- Party: African National Congress
- Other political affiliations: South African National Civic Organisation

Mmabogahla Isaiah "Messina" Masekoameng is a South African politician who has represented the African National Congress (ANC) in the Limpopo Provincial Legislature since 2014. He is a former provincial leader of the ANC-allied South African National Civic Organisation (Sanco) in Limpopo.

Masekoameng was formerly the Provincial Chairperson of the Limpopo branch of Sanco, an office which he held by early 2013. In the 2014 general election he was elected to the provincial legislature, ranked 27th on the ANC's provincial party list. In March 2019, as the end of the legislative term approached, his term as Sanco Provincial Chairperson ended when the entire Sanco provincial leadership corps was disbanded and replaced by an interim structure. The interim leadership told Masekoameng that they would not ask the ANC to remove him from the provincial legislature but reminded him that he was on the ANC's party list "on a Sanco ticket". He was re-elected to his legislative seat in the 2019 general election, ranked 9th on the ANC's party list, but was succeeded as Sanco Provincial Chairperson by Champ Sepuru.
