= Mokgadi Aphiri =

South African politician

Mokgadi Aphiri MPL

Member of the Limpopo Provincial Legislature
- Incumbent
- Assumed office 21 May 2014

Personal details
- Citizenship: South Africa
- Party: African National Congress

Mokgadi Johanna Aphiri is a South African politician who has represented the African National Congress (ANC) in the Limpopo Provincial Legislature since 2014. She was first elected to her seat in the 2014 general election, ranked 38th on the ANC's provincial party list, and was re-elected in the 2019 general election, ranked 32nd. She was elected to the Provincial Executive Committee of the ANC's Limpopo branch in June 2018 but was not re-elected in June 2022.
