= Mirriam Ramadwa =

South African politician

Member of the National Assembly of South Africa
- In office 22 May 2019 – 28 May 2024
- Constituency: Limpopo

Speaker of the Limpopo Provincial Legislature
- In office 21 May 2014 – 29 September 2015
- Preceded by: Kwena Nong
- Succeeded by: Polly Boshielo

Limpopo MEC for Sports, Arts and Culture
- In office 19 July 2013 – 21 May 2014
- Premier: Stanley Mathabatha
- Preceded by: Dipuo Letsatsi-Duba
- Succeeded by: Nandi Ndalane

Member of the Limpopo Provincial Legislature
- In office 6 May 2009 – 7 May 2019

Personal details
- Born: Matodzi Mirriam Ramadwa
- Party: African National Congress

Matodzi Mirriam Ramadwa is a South African politician. A member of the African National Congress, she was elected to the Limpopo Provincial Legislature in 2009. In 2013, she was appointed as the Member of the Executive Council (MEC) for Sports, Arts and Culture. Ramada was elected as the speaker of the provincial legislature in 2014. In 2015, she resigned as speaker. Ramadwa was elected to the National Assembly of South Africa in 2019.

== Background ==
Ramadwa is a nurse by profession. She earned a certificate in Leadership and Governance and a certificate in Labour Law from the University of the Witwatersrand. From the University of the Western Cape, she earned a diploma in Economic Management Science.

== Political career ==
Ramadwa formerly served on the provincial executive committee (PEC) and the provincial working committee (PWC) of the African National Congress in Limpopo. She was also the acting chairperson of the Congress of South African Trade Unions (COASTU) in the province.

Ramadwa was elected to the Limpopo Provincial Legislature in 2009. In July 2013, she was appointed by premier Stanley Mathabatha as the Member of the Executive Council (MEC) for Sport, Arts and Culture. Following the 2014 general elections, Ramadwa was elected as the speaker of the provincial legislature. In May 2015, the ANC ordered Ramadwa to resign as speaker of the provincial legislature, so that ANC MP Polly Boshielo could replace her. She refused to resign as speaker. On 15 August 2015, the ANC suspended her membership pending disciplinary action.

Ramadwa finally resigned as speaker on 29 September 2015, the same day that the ANC's motion for her removal as speaker was set to be debated in the provincial legislature. The suspension of her ANC membership was lifted on 18 November 2015. She continued as an ordinary member of the provincial legislature until the 2019 elections. In the 2019 elections, Ramadwa was elected to the National Assembly of South Africa from the ANC's Limpopo list. Ramadwa did not stand for reelection in 2024 and left parliament.

== Personal life ==
In August 2019, it was revealed that Ramadwa had missed the deadline to move out of the provincial Parliamentary Village in Polokwane. She said that she wrote to the legislature and the public works department asking for her stay to be extended as she needed to search for schools in Cape Town for the two orphans she looks after.
