= Lilliet Mamaregane =

South African politician

Lilliet Mamaregane MPL

Member of the Limpopo Provincial Legislature
- Incumbent
- Assumed office 6 October 2022

Permanent Delegate to the National Council of Provinces
- In office 23 May 2019 – 6 October 2022
- Constituency: Limpopo

Personal details
- Citizenship: South Africa
- Party: African National Congress

Mmamora Lilliet Mamaregane is a South African politician who has represented the African National Congress (ANC) in the Limpopo Provincial Legislature since October 2022. Before that she served in the National Council of Provinces (NCOP) since 2019. She is an active member and former Provincial Secretary of the ANC Women's League in Limpopo.

== Life and career ==
Mamaregane matriculated at Mafolofolo Secondary School in Sebayeng near Polokwane in present-day Limpopo province. In the 1980s, she was a shop steward in the South African Commercial, Catering and Allied Workers Union and was also active in the South African National Civic Organisation. She joined the ANC in the 1990s and subsequently rose through the local and regional ranks of the ANC Women's League in Limpopo. She also served for a period as a local councillor in the Capricorn District Municipality.

In September 2015, she was elected Provincial Secretary of the ANC Women's League in Limpopo, beating the incumbent, Maleke Mokganyetsi, in a vote; she deputised league Provincial Chairperson Joy Matshoge, who was elected at the same league conference. In 2018, Mamaregane was elected to a four-year term on the Provincial Executive Committee of the mainstream Limpopo ANC.

The following year, in the 2019 general election, Mamaregane was elected to a seat in the NCOP, ranked 48th on the ANC's party list. The ANC also nominated her to serve as Chairperson of the Select Committee on Communications and Public Enterprises. However, she was not re-elected to the ANC Provincial Executive Committee in June 2022. In October 2022, when Mamaregane had served just over three years in the NCOP, the ANC announced that she would leave the national Parliament to be sworn into the Limpopo Provincial Legislature.
