= Jossey Buthane =

South African politician (born 1979)

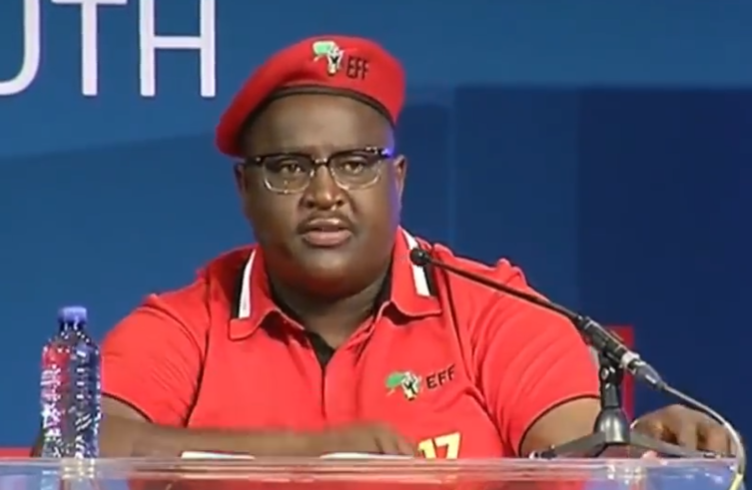

Member of the Limpopo Provincial Legislature
- In office 21 May 2014 – 1 April 2024

Personal details
- Born: Modikane Joseph Buthane; 19 August 1979 (age 46)
- Party: African National Congress
- Other political affiliations: Economic Freedom Fighters (2013–2024)

Modikane Joseph "Jossey" Buthane (born 19 August 1979) is a South African politician from Limpopo Province. Between May 2014 and April 2024, he represented the Economic Freedom Fighters in the Limpopo Provincial Legislature. He defected to the African National Congress during the 2024 general election campaign.

== Political career ==
Buthane began his political career as a member of the African National Congress (ANC). A regional leader of the ANC Youth League (ANCYL) in Limpopo, he was a close ally of ANCYL leader Julius Malema. Between 2011 and 2013, he was a prominent supporter of Malema in Malema's ongoing feud with Boy Mamabolo.

=== Economic Freedom Fighters: 2013–2024 ===
When Malema founded the Economic Freedom Fighters (EFF) as an ANC breakaway party in 2013, Buthane denied rumors that he would join the new party, saying that Malema was his "friend-cum-brother" but that he remained a member of the ANC. However, in October 2013, he announced his defection from the ANC to the EFF. He had recently lost his position as chairman of the ANC's Seshego branch to Mamabolo, but he implied that his primary grievance with the ANC was related to tribalism, describing the party as "the Amazulu National Congress" and "a social club of individuals."

Buthane was appointed as interim provincial co-ordinator of the EFF's Limpopo branch, replacing George Raphela, and he joined the Limpopo Provincial Legislature as an EFF representative in the May 2014 general election. He served two terms in the provincial legislature, gaining re-election in the May 2019 general election. In the 2019 general election the EFF additionally nominated him for election to the National Assembly, but he was ranked 86th on the party's national list and did not gain election.

He also remained in the leadership of the EFF's Limpopo branch, serving as provincial secretary and then, from 2018, as provincial chairperson. However, in 2022, the EFF's national leadership announced that it would disband Buthane's provincial leadership corps in Limpopo, dissatisfied with the provincial party's performance in the 2021 local elections.

=== Return to African National Congress: 2024–present ===
On 7 April 2024, during an ANC rally in Polokwane, Buthane announced that he had defected from the EFF to rejoin the ANC. Among his reasons for leaving the EFF, he cited the decision to disband the party's provincial leadership in 2022 and personal attacks on him by Malema. According to the ANC, Buthane went on to become instrumental in mobilising former EFF members to support the ANC during the May 2024 general election.

== Allegations of violence ==
In 2012, Buthane appeared in the Mankweng Magistrate's Court on charges of assaulting a fellow ANCYL member at a University of Limpopo rally.

In September 2014, he was charged with assault with intent to do grievous bodily harm for an alleged attack on a fellow EFF member at a party meeting in Mahwelereng.

In August 2015, he was charged with assault for allegedly hitting a student with a stick during a student gathering at the University of Limpopo. The following month, he and other EFF members were arrested in Mahwelereng on unrelated charges of inciting public violence.

In August 2018, News24 reported that Buthane was standing trial in the magistrate's court in Schoonoord, accused of assaulting a female EFF member during a party meeting in December 2016. Buthane denied the plaintiff's accusation, telling the newspaper, "Politically, she is the one who abuses men by taking advantage of Women's Month."

During the #AmINext protests of 2019, Buthane was one of several male politicians named anonymously on Twitter as facing several rape and sexual assault charges; Buthane denied having ever sexually assaulted anyone.

In January 2020, Buthane, with Boy Mamabolo and others, was arrested on charges of malicious damage to property and theft, related to vigil ante attacks on various houses in Seshego. The local newspaper Polokwane Observer said that Buthane also faced charges of attempted murder, assault with intent to do grievous bodily harm, and kidnapping. The attacks apparently took place when the accused and others endeavored to effect citizen's arrests on suspected gangsters in the area.

In May 2024, shortly before the general election, Buthane was arrested on charges of attempted murder and possession of an unlicensed firearm. The charges related to political violence between EFF and ANC supporters in the Juju Valley region of Seshego between 18 and 19 May, in which a 25-year-old man and nine-year-old girl were wounded. Buthane, charged with attempted murder of the man, was reportedly seen shooting into a crowd of people during the clashes. After Buthane was released on bail, the ANC alleged that the charges were politically motivated. The charges were dropped in November 2024.
