= Step-aside rule =

Policy of the African National Congress

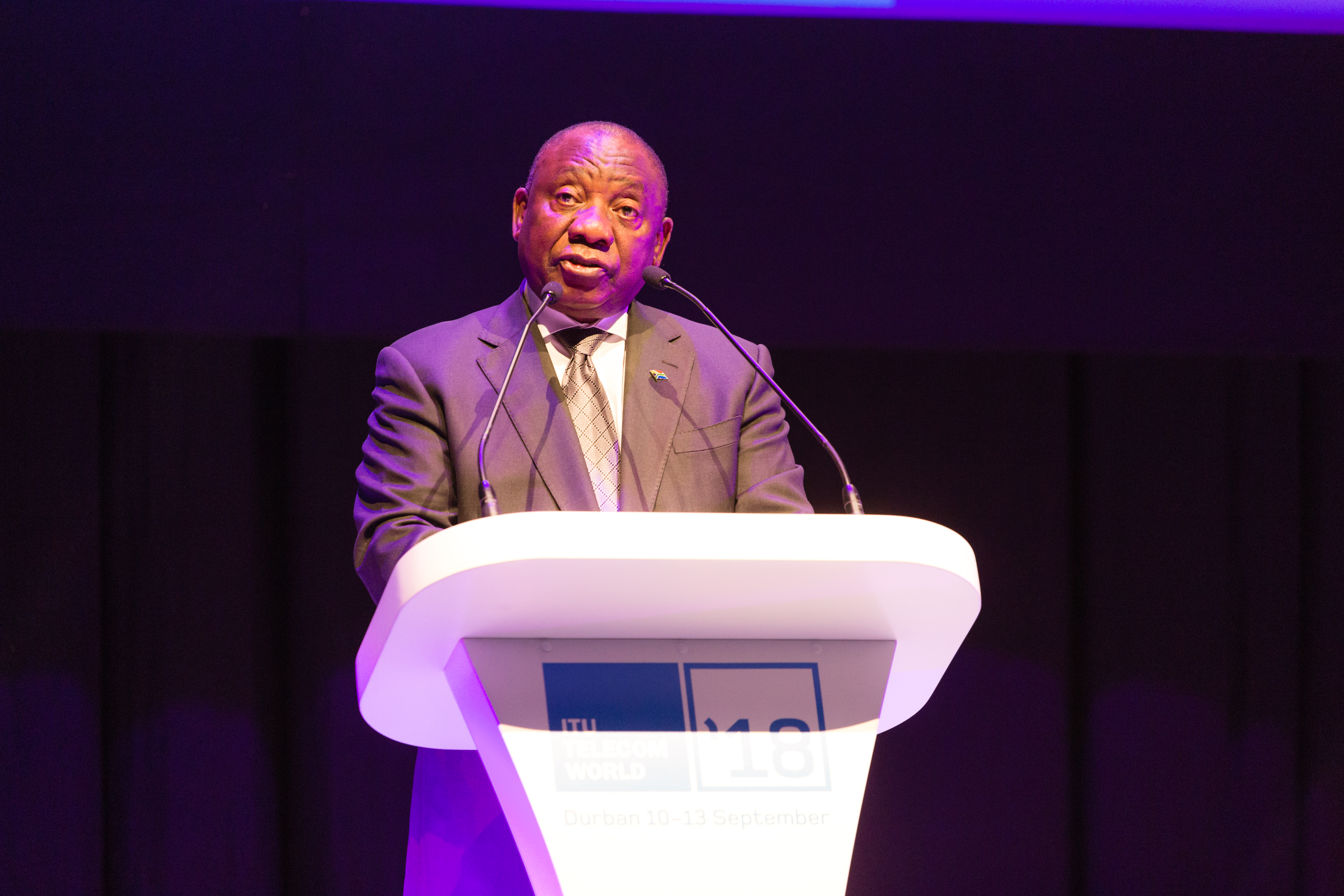
The step-aside rule is associated with Cyril Ramaphosa's effort to repair the ANC's image following various corruption scandals.

The step-aside rule is an internal policy of the African National Congress (ANC), the ruling party of South Africa, which requires members charged with corruption or other serious crimes voluntarily to "step aside" from participation in party and government activities, or face suspension. Since its adoption in 2017 at the ANC's 54th National Conference, it has led to the suspension of several ANC members, most prominently ANC Secretary-General Ace Magashule. In 2022, it was applied to prohibit affected members from standing in internal leadership elections.

== History ==
=== 2017: Step-aside resolution ===
The origin of the step-aside rule is the 2015 National General Council (NGC) meeting of the African National Congress (ANC). During the presidency of Jacob Zuma (2009–2018), political corruption in the ANC-led government had become an increasingly important issue, especially amid mounting allegations of state capture by Zuma and his associates. The 2015 NGC had a heated debate about the powers of the ANC's internal Integrity Commission, and ultimately resolved to reinforce the commission's powers to respond to allegations of corruption by ANC members.

In December 2017, the ANC's 54th National Conference – which also elected Cyril Ramaphosa as ANC president – ANC Secretary-General Gwede Mantashe emphasised concerns about corruption in his organisational report, saying, "we must accept that corruption is therefore systemic in our movement, as was the case with the apartheid state". The delegates at the conference resolved to "Reaffirm the 2015 NGC resolution that, ANC leaders and members who are alleged to be involved in corrupt activities, should, where necessary step aside until their names are cleared." The conference also called on the ANC's National Executive Committee (NEC) to implement measures to:

- Demand that every cadre accused of, or reported to be involved in, corrupt practices accounts to the Integrity Committee immediately or faces DC [disciplinary] processes...
- Summarily suspend people who fail to give an acceptable explanation or to voluntarily step down, while they face disciplinary, investigative or prosecutorial procedures.
- We publicly disassociate ourselves from anyone, whether business donor, supporter or member, accused of corruption or reported to be involved in corruption.

The so-called step-aside resolution was viewed as aiming to restore the party's reputation and public image, as part of a broader campaign, spearheaded by Ramaphosa, for the internal "renewal" of the ANC.

=== 2021: Step-aside guidelines ===
In October 2020, facing controversy around the corruption charges against ANC Secretary-General Ace Magashule, the ANC consulted several advocates on the legality of the step-aside resolution. In December, the NEC – the ANC's top national leadership – directed its so-called "Top Six" leaders to develop guidelines for the implementation of the resolution, bearing in mind the advocates' warnings about the need to ensure compatibility with national labour law, the party's constitution, and the national Constitution. The Top Six delegated the task to ANC stalwarts Mathews Phosa and Kgalema Motlanthe, who presented their recommendations to the NEC in February 2021. The NEC adopted their recommendations as the so-called step-aside guidelines, which provided detailed procedures for implementation under different circumstances.

In broad strokes, the guidelines required that ANC members facing allegations or charges of corruption (or other serious crimes) should present themselves to the Integrity Commission, should step aside voluntarily if indicted, and should resign if convicted. ANC bodies would consider the seriousness of any allegations to determine whether they merited the implementation of the step-aside rule, and would summarily suspend members who refused to step aside when requested to do so. The suspension would proceed in line with the ANC constitution – rule 25.56 provides for leadership bodies to impose temporary suspension of members prior to the commencement of disciplinary proceedings, while rule 25.70 allows that:

Where a public representative, office-bearer or member has been indicted to appear in a court of law on any charge, the Secretary General or Provincial Secretary, acting on the authority of the NEC, the NWC [National Working Committee], the PEC [Provincial Executive Committees] or the PWC [Provincial Working Committees], if satisfied that the temporary suspension of such public representative, office-bearer or member would be in the best interest of the Organisation, may suspend such public representative, elected office-bearer or member and impose terms and conditions to regulate their participation and conduct during the suspension.

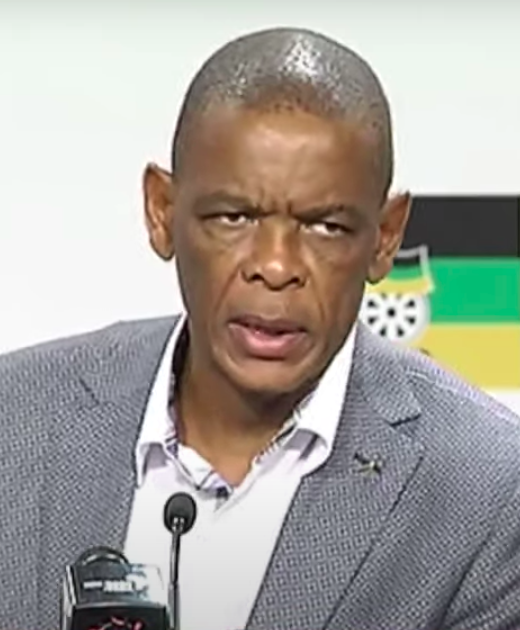
Ace Magashule was suspended as Secretary-General in May 2021, after he refused to step aside.

In May, the National Working Committee of the NEC said that it had received reports on the status of charges of corruption or other serious crimes against ANC members and had instructed that letters should be written to affected members, in line with the guidelines, to ask them to step aside within thirty days or face suspension. The decision that a given member should step aside would be reviewed by the party every six months. At the same time, Magashule – who had been suspended in terms of the guidelines – challenged his suspension and the underlying step-aside rule in the courts; the high court (and later the Constitutional Court) dismissed his application, ruling that the step-aside rule was consistent both with the ANC constitution and with the national Constitution.

=== 2022: Application to internal elections ===
In April 2022, following another NEC meeting, the NEC announced that it had expanded the step-aside policy to regulate the participation of affected members in the party's internal elections. In the preceding weeks, ANC members had been elected to subnational party offices while facing criminal charges – Zandile Gumede as chairperson in eThekwini, and Mandla Msibi as treasurer in Mpumalanga – and the NEC said that it sought "to close that gap" and avoid further "confusion and serious reputational damage to the organization". Specifically, the NEC decided that members who had been asked to step aside would not be allowed to stand for election to party leadership positions, and therefore must decline any nominations to such positions. The rule would not apply retroactively, but it would apply to national leadership elections at the ANC's 55th National Conference, scheduled for December 2022. Written guidelines later released by the NEC also specified that members under indictment could not hold senior positions in the government executive or legislature; affected public representatives would be allowed to attend and vote in legislative sittings, and would continue to receive their salaries, but would not be allowed to speak on behalf of the ANC in public.

At the ANC's National Policy Conference in late July 2022, the rule was discussed and even challenged by some delegates; but the rule was reaffirmed by attendees. Ramaphosa said that, "the overwhelming view of the policy conference is for the retention of the step-aside provisions to enhance the integrity of the movement and its leadership", but that "there are strong concerns on the perceived lack of consistency in the application and implementation of this policy... this must receive urgent attention so that the application of the guidelines is impartial, is fair and consistent." In August, the National Working Committee endorsed and circulated a proposal to amend the ANC's constitution to further institutionalise the step-aside rule. Developed by an internal subcommittee led by national Justice Minister Ronald Lamola, the proposal describes stepping aside as:

Voluntarily relinquishing, forgoing or refraining from temporarily exercising or enjoying the benefits, privileges and entitlements, including not standing for a position in the [national, provincial, regional, or branch executives]. This extends to holding any office, post or position as an office bearer, public representative, member or deployee, pending the finalisation of any process or proceeding, including a disciplinary hearing, appeal or review, whether inside or outside the organisation.

The constitutional amendment will be considered at the 55th National Conference in December, where other factions of the party are expected to argue that the rule should be overturned entirely. Indeed, the Daily Maverick said that the step-aside rule had become the heart of a "proxy battle by policy" inside the ANC.

== Opposition ==
The step-aside rule has been highly controversial inside the ANC. NEC members Nkosazana Dlamini-Zuma and Lindiwe Sisulu have both questioned the rule: Sisulu on the grounds that it transgresses members' right to political participation, especially if the relevant criminal cases remain pending for years at a time; and Dlamini-Zuma on the grounds that it is divisive as well as unjust and inconsistent with the presumption of innocence. The provincial leadership of the ANC in KwaZulu-Natal was highly critical of the rule, arguing that it was detrimental to the internal unity of the ANC and that it had been selectively applied, and some Limpopo branches of the ANC opposed it on similar grounds. On the charge of selective implementation, Ramaphosa's critics have claimed that he used the step-aside rule to "sideline his opponents" in the party. In October 2022, Sisulu argued that, on a consistent application of the step-aside rule, Ramaphosa himself should step aside until the Phala Phala matter had been resolved.

The most comprehensive statement of criticism of the step-aside rule is contained in a petition, launched by ANC members in October, which articulated a "step-aside rule motion" calling for ANC members to vote to reject the step-aside rule on the first day of the 55th National Conference. Reportedly circulated by NEC member Dakota Legoete, among others, the petition said:

Presently formulated and recently implemented, the resolution constitutes an abdication of the ANC’s responsibility and powers, and transfers such powers and responsibility to institutions of the state, which reside outside the sphere of the ANC. This has meant that these state institutions like the NPA, the DPCI, public protector and SIU, may, for ulterior or factional purposes, be manipulated by those members of the ANC who are in control of state power, as well as powerful forces outside the ANC... The skewed and inconsistent implementation of the step-aside resolution has revealed its inherent conflict with the ANC’s constitution and the (country’s) Constitution... Its implementation has gravely prejudiced comrades who have not been found guilty by any court of law or the ANC’s own disciplinary processes. By outsourcing its power in this manner, the ANC risks a real possibility that state institutions ... can simply, and arbitrarily, remove any elected ANC leader whom they do not prefer. This can result in abuse of state institutions for factional party political purposes, the targeting of certain persons and the execution of selective justice – which is not justice at all.

== Examples ==
The ANC step-aside rule has been applied to:

- Bongani Bongo
- Khusela Diko
- Zandile Gumede
- Mike Mabuyakhulu
- Ace Magashule
- Tolly Mashamaite
- Zweli Mkhize
- Olly Mlamleli
- Mandla Msibi
- Danny Msiza
- Zukiswa Ncitha
- Danville Smith
- Zizi Kodwa
