= Florence Radzilani =

South African politician (born 1971)

Florence Radzilani MPL

Member of the Limpopo Executive Council for Social Development
- Incumbent
- Assumed office 20 June 2024
- Premier: Phophi Ramathuba
- Preceded by: Nandi Ndalane

Member of the Limpopo Executive Council for Transport and Community Safety
- In office 11 October 2022 – 14 June 2024
- Premier: Stanley Mathabatha
- Preceded by: Polly Boshielo
- Succeeded by: Violet Mathye

Member of the Limpopo Executive Council for Safety, Security and Liaison
- In office 15 March 2012 – 19 July 2013
- Premier: Cassel Mathale
- Preceded by: George Phadagi
- Succeeded by: Joyce Mashamba

Personal details
- Born: Fulufhelo Florence Dzombere; April 21, 1971 (age 55) Ha-Masakona, Transvaal; South Africa
- Party: African National Congress
- Spouse: Stanley Radzilani
- Education: University of Venda; University of Limpopo

Fulufhelo Florence Radzilani (née Dzhombere; born 21 April 1971) is a South African politician who is currently serving as Member of the Executive Council (MEC) for Social Development in Limpopo Province. She has represented the African National Congress (ANC) in the Limpopo Provincial Legislature since 2019. She was formerly the executive mayor of Vhembe District Municipality.

Radzilani served two terms as Vhembe mayor, from 2011 to 2012 and from 2016 to 2018. In the interim she was a member of the provincial legislature between 2012 and 2014 and MEC for Safety, Security and Liaison between 2012 and 2013. Her second mayoral term ended in December 2018, when she resigned after being implicated in the corruption scandal at VBS Mutual Bank.

After the VBS scandal, Radzilani returned to the Limpopo Provincial Legislature. Premier Stan Mathabatha appointed her as MEC for Transport and Community Safety in October 2022, and Premier Phophi Ramathuba moved her to her current position in June 2024.

She has been a member of the ANC Provincial Executive Committee in Limpopo since 2011, and in June 2018 she was elected Deputy Provincial Chairperson of the ANC in Limpopo. Although the VBS scandal led her to "step aside" from this position between December 2018 and September 2020, she was re-elected to a second four-year term in the party office in June 2022.

== Early life and education ==
Radzilani was born on 21 April 1971 in Ha-Masakona village in the region that is now Limpopo province. She earned a Bachelor's degree from the University of Venda and a diploma in higher education from the University of the North. In later years, she also received an Honours degree in public administration from the University of Limpopo, a diploma in municipal governance from Rand Afrikaans University, and a certificate in executive leadership management from the University of Pretoria. She was a member of the African National Congress (ANC) Youth League.

== Political career ==
Radzilani was an ANC councillor in the Makhado Local Municipality in Limpopo from 2000 to 2006, when she was appointed to a management position in the Office of the Limpopo Premier. After a brief stint in the Premier's office, from 2007 to 2011 she served as Member of the Mayoral Committee for Technical Services in Limpopo's Vhembe District Municipality. She served her first term as Executive Mayor of Vhembe from 2011 to 2012.

Over the same period, Radzilani held various positions in the Limpopo branch of the ANC, her political party. In October 2010, she was elected chairperson of the Vhembe regional branch of the ANC Women's League. The following year, she was elected to the Provincial Executive Committee (PEC) of the ANC in Limpopo, serving as Deputy Provincial Secretary.

=== Limpopo Provincial Legislature: 2012–2014 ===
On 15 March 2012, Radzilani was sworn in as a Member of the Limpopo Provincial Legislature and as Member of the Executive Council (MEC) for Safety, Security and Liaison in the Limpopo provincial government. However, when Stan Mathabatha took office as Limpopo Premier in July 2013, he reshuffled his executive, firing Radzilani and replacing her with Joyce Mashamba.

Radzilani completed her term as ANC Deputy Provincial Secretary in 2014, when she was elected to a four-year term as an ordinary ANC PEC member. She was not re-elected to the provincial legislature in the 2014 general election, having been ranked 41st on the ANC's provincial party list.

=== Return to Vhembe mayoralty: 2016–2018 ===
In 2016, she was returned to her prior position as Executive Mayor of Vhembe. In June 2018, she was elected Deputy Provincial Chairperson of the ANC in Limpopo, serving under ANC Provincial Chairperson Stan Mathabatha.

==== VBS scandal ====
Also in 2018, Radzilani was implicated in a major corruption scandal at VBS Mutual Bank when she was named in the report of an investigation commissioned by the South African Reserve Bank. The investigation was conducted by advocate Terry Motau, who said that Radzilani had been at the centre of "one of the most illuminating examples of the rampant corruption and bribery that occurred" at VBS, which was declared insolvent in 2018 after bank executives defrauded depositors. Under Radzilani, the Vhembe municipality had reportedly deposited (and subsequently lost) R300 million at VBS; the report, entitled "the Great Bank Heist", further alleged that Radzilani had demanded large kickbacks in exchange for keeping this municipal money deposited at VBS. The report reproduced WhatsApp messages in which the former VBS chairperson, Tshifhiwa Matodzi, was informed that Radzilani had been "crying" because she had only received R300,000 in kickbacks. Radzilani denied wrongdoing and said that Motau's report was defamatory.

In early December 2018, while criminal investigations into the VBS fraud were underway, the National Executive Committee of the ANC asked Radzilani to "step aside" from all ANC activities until her name had been cleared in the VBS saga. Later the same week, the ANC PEC asked her and other implicated mayors to resign their government positions; Radzilani submitted her resignation letter on 11 December 2018.

=== Return to Limpopo Provincial Legislature: 2019–present ===
In the 2019 general election, Radzilani was re-elected to the Limpopo Provincial Legislature. In September 2020, the ANC National Executive Committee decided, and the Limpopo PEC agreed, that Radzilani could return to her party leadership role, given that she had not been prosecuted in the two years since she had stepped aside and no conclusive evidence had emerged to implicate her in wrongdoing. She was therefore reinstated as ANC Deputy Provincial Chairperson, and in June 2022 she won election to a second four-year term in that position.

After her re-election to her ANC office, Stan Mathabatha, as Limpopo Premier, appointed her his MEC for Transport and Community Safety on 6 October 2022. She was sworn in on 11 October.

Following the 2024 general election, the newly elected Premier Phophi Ramathuba appointed her as MEC for Social Development.

== Personal life ==
Radzilani is married to Stanley Radzilani, who is a pastor.

In 2018 there was a minor scandal when her husband told the Sowetan that he had obtained a voice recording in which Premier Stan Mathabatha confessed romantic feelings towards Radzilani, his deputy in the ANC. Pastor Radzilani said that he had leaked the recording and had played it to his church congregation. Mathabatha's spokesperson initially denied the veracity of the recording, but both the Sunday World and City Press reported that Mathabatha admitted its veracity in an affidavit as part of an unsuccessful application to interdict media coverage of the recording.
