= 2019 Limpopo provincial election =

Provincial election

- 8 May 2019

All 49 seats to the Limpopo Provincial Legislature 25 seats needed for a majority
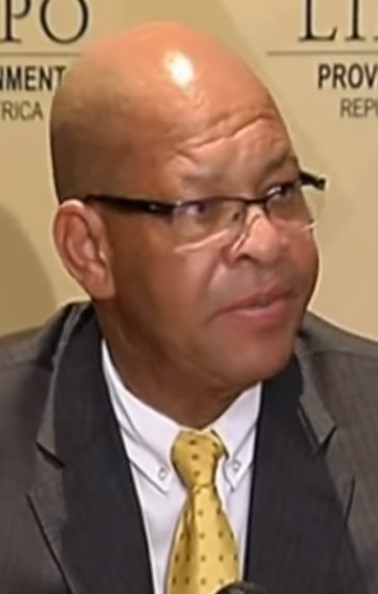

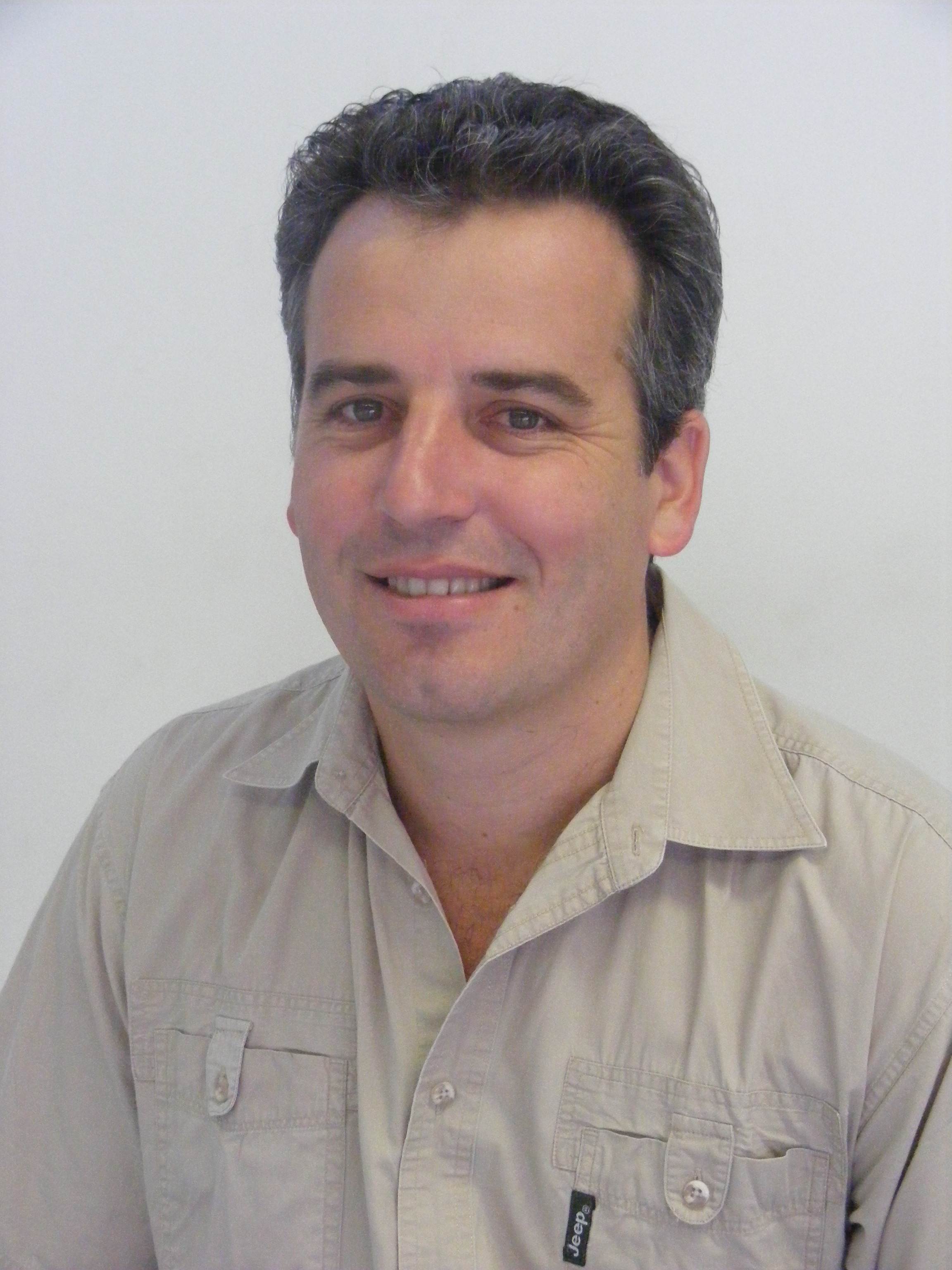

	First party	Second party
Candidate	Stanley Mathabatha	Jossey Buthane
Party	ANC	EFF
Last election	78.60%	10.74%
Seats before	39	6
Seats won	38	7
Seat change	▼1	▲1
Popular vote	1,096,300	209,488
Percentage	75.49%	14.43%
Swing	▼3.11%	▲3.69%
	Third party	Fourth party
Candidate	Jacques Smalle	Marcelle Maritz
Party	DA	VF+
Last election	6.48%	0.69%
Seats before	3	0
Seats won	3	1
Seat change	0	▲1
Popular vote	78,360	20,572
Percentage	5.40%	1.42%
Swing	▼1.08%	▲0.73%
Premier before election
Stanley Mathabatha
African National Congress
Elected Premier
Stanley Mathabatha
African National Congress

The 2019 Limpopo provincial election was held on 8 May 2019 to elect the 49 members of the Limpopo Provincial Legislature. It was held on the same day as the 2019 South African general election. The election was won by the African National Congress, the incumbent governing party in the province.

== Premier candidates ==
The African National Congress (ANC) did not announce a candidate for premier prior to the election. Incumbent premier and ANC provincial chairperson Stanley Mathabatha headed the ANC's list. After the election, the ANC National Executive Committee announced Mathabatha as the party's premier candidate.

The Economic Freedom Fighters (EFF) did not field a premier candidate because the party seeks to abolish provincial governments. Jossey Buthane, the party's provincial chair, headed the EFF list.

The Democratic Alliance (DA) chose their provincial leader and current member of the legislature, Jacques Smalle, as its premier candidate.

Mogalakwena Local Municipality councillor Marcelle Maritz was the Freedom Front Plus's premier candidate.

== Results ==
Party	Votes	%	+/–	Seats	+/–
African National Congress	1,096,300	75.49	–3.11	38	–1
Economic Freedom Fighters	209,488	14.43	+3.69	7	+1
Democratic Alliance	78,360	5.40	–1.08	3	0
Freedom Front Plus	20,572	1.42	+0.73	1	+1
African People's Convention	5,290	0.36	+0.01	0	0
African Christian Democratic Party	5,069	0.35	–0.13	0	0
African Transformation Movement	4,136	0.28	New	0	New
African Independent Congress	3,961	0.27	New	0	New
Congress of the People	3,398	0.23	–0.63	0	–1
Azanian People's Organisation	2,450	0.17	–0.09	0	0
Pan Africanist Congress	2,408	0.17	–0.12	0	0
Agang South Africa	2,265	0.16	–0.20	0	0
Bolsheviks Party of South Africa	2,088	0.14	New	0	New
South African Maintenance and Estate Beneficiaries Association	2,045	0.14	+0.06	0	0
Civic Warriors of Maruleng	2,043	0.14	New	0	New
International Revelation Congress	1,799	0.12	New	0	New
Socialist Revolutionary Workers Party	1,392	0.10	New	0	New
United Democratic Movement	1,324	0.09	–0.18	0	0
Ximoko Party	1,163	0.08	–0.13	0	0
Gaza Movement for Change	831	0.06	New	0	New
African Covenant	690	0.05	New	0	New
Inkatha Freedom Party	655	0.05	–0.03	0	0
Magoshi Swaranang Movement	651	0.04	New	0	New
Better Residents Association	647	0.04	New	0	New
Good	494	0.03	New	0	New
Gazankulu Liberation Congress	462	0.03	New	0	New
Power of Africans Unity	414	0.03	New	0	New
African Renaissance Unity Party	397	0.03	New	0	New
African Content Movement	281	0.02	New	0	New
African People's Socialist	267	0.02	New	0	New
Women Forward	256	0.02	New	0	New
Land Party	227	0.02	New	0	New
National Freedom Party	191	0.01	–0.03	0	0
South African National Congress of Traditional Authorities	144	0.01	New	0	New
Total	1,452,158	100.00	–	49	0
Valid votes	1,452,158	98.77			
Invalid/blank votes	18,072	1.23			
Total votes	1,470,230	100.00			
Registered voters/turnout	2,608,460	56.36			
Source: Election Resources
