= VBS Mutual Bank =

Defunct South African mutual bank

- Type: Public
- Industry: Banking
- Founded: 1982
- Defunct: 2018
- Fate: Insolvency (Bankruptcy)
- Headquarters: Rivonia, Johannesburg, South Africa
- Area served: Limpopo, South Africa
- Key people: Andile Ramavhunga (CEO); Philip Truter (CFO); Tshifhiwa Matodzi (Chairperson)
- Products: Private banking Consumer banking
- Revenue: R47 million (2016)
- Net income: R4.7 million (2016)
- Total assets: R1,018,036,301 (2016)
- Total equity: R144 million (2016)
- Number of employees: 87 (2016)
- Website: vbsmutualbank.co.za

VBS Mutual Bank was a South African mutual bank. In 2018 it was declared insolvent and bankrupt and placed under curatorship, with South African citizens and taxpayers defrauded out of roughly R2 billion.

It was formed as Venda Building Society in 1982, and became a mutual bank in 1992. By 2016 the bank reportedly had around 30,000 depositors with all deposits in the bank totalling R800 million. In 2017 the bank planned to list on the Johannesburg Stock Exchange; however, this never materialized. Most of its branches and clients were located in Limpopo province.

== History ==
Prior to 2014 the bank was relatively small and primarily involved in retail banking with many of its depositors consisting of burial societies and stokvels. The bank in turn issued mortgages and short-term loans to its clients allowing them to use their property or banking deposits as collateral. The South African Public Investment Corporation inherited its shares in VBS bank when it succeeded the pension fund of the Venda bantustan government thereby giving it a 25% ownership stake in the bank. Largest shareholder in the bank was Dyambeu Investments which owned 26% of the bank, 51% of Dyambeu Investments was owned by the Venda Royal family.

Prior to coming under curatorship in 2018 the bank gained notoriety in 2016 when it gave a R7.8 million loan to then President Jacob Zuma when he was ordered to repay the state for controversial improvements to his personal homestead at Nkandla.

In mid-2018 the South African Reserve Bank (SARB) instructed municipalities to withdraw their deposits in the bank as the Municipal Finance Management Act prevented them from depositing public funds in mutual banks. This, along with mismanagement and corruption within the bank, created a liquidity crisis for the bank. The prudential authority filed for VBS bankruptcy at the North Gauteng High Court on 30 October 2018. On 13 November 2018 the North Gauteng High Court issued a final order to liquidate VBS mutual bank.

== Curatorship ==
As a result of its liquidity problems, VBS Bank was placed under curatorship on 11 March 2018 in terms of the South African Banks Act, Act 94 of 1990, by the South African Reserve Bank.

The collapse of the bank had a large negative impact on the funeral industry in Limpopo Province as the bank was unable to honour insurance and burial society obligations backed by the bank. It also had a devastating impact on stokvel and saving societies held by poor, predominantly black, South Africans in the Limpopo Province.

In October 2018 the national government announced that it would not bail out South African municipalities that had irregularly deposited R1.57 billion with the bank before it collapsed. After the bank's collapse it was found that the bank held R372 million in negative equity.

== Corruption ==
A 2018 report released by the SARB in October found evidence of wide-scale looting, fraud and corruption. It recommended that bank leadership, public officials, and auditors be criminally charged and held liable in civil proceedings. The report found that R1,894,923,674 was transferred from the Bank to fifty-three individuals between 15 March 2015 and 17 June 2018. According to the report, R16,148,569 of that money went to Brian Shivambu, younger brother of the former Economic Freedom Fighter senior politician Floyd Shivambu. The report also implicated the African National Congress's deputy chairperson for Limpopo, Florence Radzilani, and treasurer, Danny Msiza.

EFF leader Julius Malema sued a former EFF senior member of his party for alleging that Malema had admitted to him that he benefitted from corruption at VBS. Malema later withdrew the lawsuit. By June 2021 Brian Shivambu paid back R4.55 million and admitted that he received VBS money. Jacob Zuma defaulted on a R7.8 million loan that he obtained to finance his Nkandla homestead.

In June 2020 eight people associated with VBS and the bank's auditor, KPMG, were charged by the NPA on 47 counts of theft, fraud, corruption, and contraventions of the Prevention of Organised Crime Act. Chairperson Tshifhiwa Matodzi, CEO Andile Ramavhunga and CFO Philip Truter were among those arrested and charged.

As part of ongoing investigations, the Hawks arrested three additional individuals suspected of fraud on 16 November 2021. In October 2023 the Parliamentary Ethics Committee found that former EFF deputy leader Floyd Shivambu had received VBS money through transfers from Sgameka Projects Pty Ltd. totaling R180,000 but that no evidence could be found that EFF leader Julius Malema had received any of the VBS Bank missing funds.

In July 2024 former chairperson Tshifhiwa Matodzi was sentenced to an effective 15 years in prison on multiple counts of fraud, racketeering, money laundering and theft.

Thembi Simelane appeared before the ANC integrity committee on 02 September 2024 to answer for the money she received from VBS. Simelane allegedly received a R586,000 loan from VBS Mutual Bank through a company that provided the loan . On the 6th of September 2024 embattled Justice Minister Thembi Simelane on Friday told MPs she took a loan from a financial entity that served as a fixer for VBS Mutual Bank at an interest rate of nearly 50% because she was unable to borrow money from a commercial bank on better terms.

== Lawsuits ==
In February 2021, the liquidators for the bank sued their auditor, KPMG, for 863.5 million rand (~US$59 million) over its audit opinion on the now defunct bank. It was reported in February 2024 that KPMG had settled the lawsuit in a confidential out-of-court settlement for Rand 500 million (~$27 million).

In July 2021, South Africa's largest asset manager, the Public Investment Corporation (PIC) sued KPMG for 144 million rand (around US$9.5 million) it lost when the VBS Mutual Bank went bankrupt as a result of fraud. Its claim is centred on the rights issue and a revolving credit facility it participated in at VBS relying on financial statements audited by KPMG and its former senior partner, Sipho Malaba.
