= Faction (disambiguation) =

A faction is a group of people with a common political purpose.

Faction or factionalism may also refer to:

- The Faction, an American punk rock band
- Faction (literature), a type of historical novel based on fact
- The Faction, an Atlanta United supporters' group
- Faction fighting, an English term for Irish mass stick fights, see Bataireacht
- a slang term for non-fiction novel (as a portmanteau of "fact" and "fiction")
