= Phophi Ramathuba =

South African politician and medical doctor (born 1973)

The Honourable Phophi Ramathuba MPL
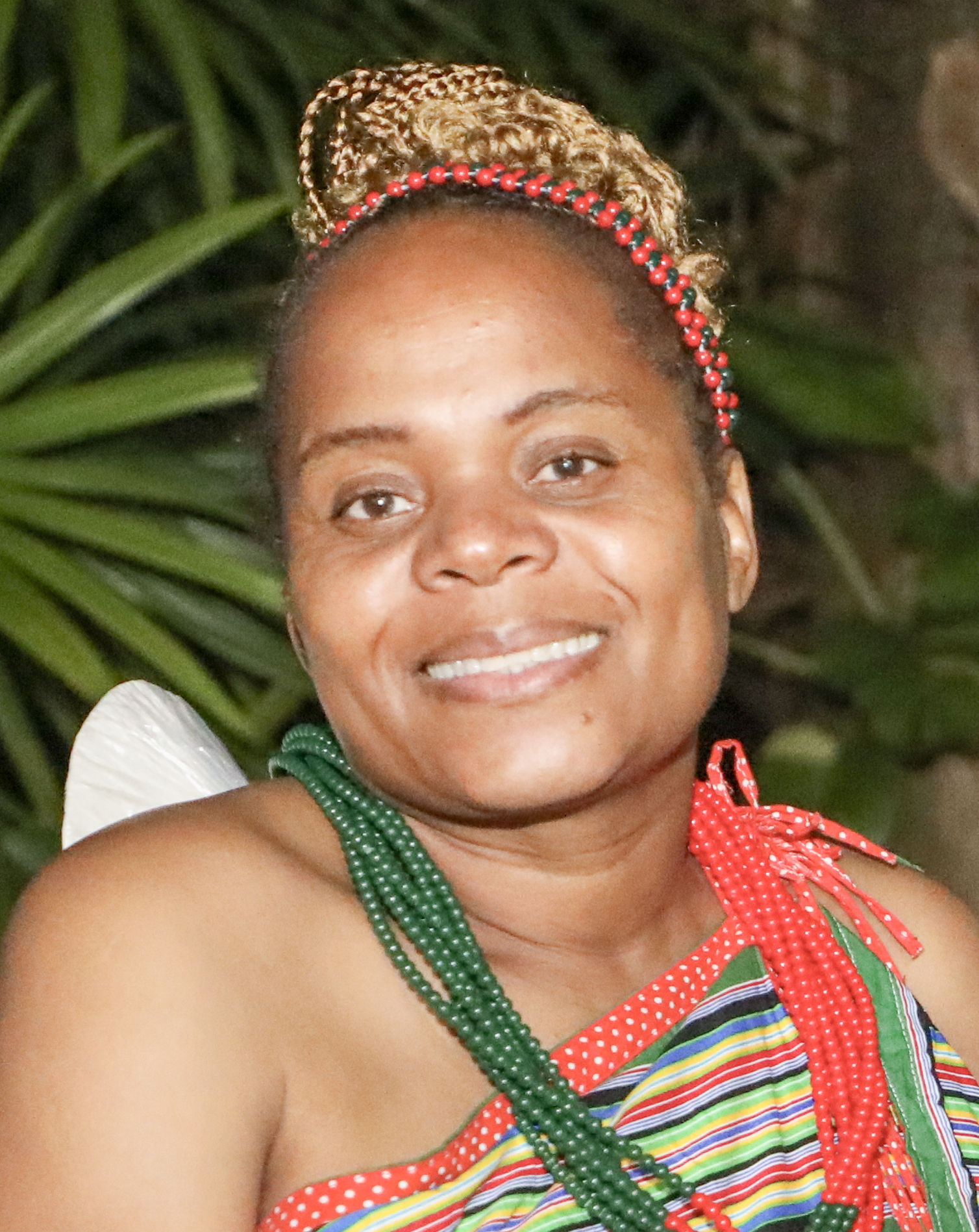
- Ramathuba in 2024

5th Premier of Limpopo
- Incumbent
- Assumed office 14 June 2024
- Preceded by: Stanley Mathabatha

Limpopo MEC for Health
- In office 27 May 2015 – 13 June 2024
- Premier: Stanley Mathabatha
- Preceded by: Maaria Ishmael Kgetjepe
- Succeeded by: Dieketseng Mashego

Member of the Limpopo Provincial Legislature
- Incumbent
- Assumed office 27 May 2015

Personal details
- Born: 15 August 1973 (age 53) Elim Hospital, Waterval, Transvaal Province, South Africa
- Party: African National Congress
- Children: 2
- Education: Sefako Makgatho Health Sciences University; University of Pretoria
- Profession: Politician

Phophi Constance Ramathuba (born 15 August 1973) is a South African politician and medical doctor serving as Premier of Limpopo since June 2024. A member of the African National Congress, she was sworn into the provincial legislature in May 2015. Ramathuba served as the Limpopo MEC (Member of the Executive Council) for Health and from May 2015 to June 2024.

== Early life and career ==
Ramathuba was born on 15 August 1973 at Elim Hospital, Waterval and grew up in Mashamba, then part of South Africa's Transvaal Province. She is one of five children. She matriculated at Mbilwi Secondary School and studied at the Sefako Makgatho Health Sciences University (formerly known as MEDUNSA), where she obtained a bachelor of medicine and a bachelor of surgery degree. From the University of Pretoria, she received a master's degree in medical pharmacology. Ramathuba had also fulfilled courses in health and business leadership.

Ramathuba started her career as an intern at the Mokopane Hospital. Prior to being appointed to the Limpopo provincial government, she was the chief executive of the Voortrekker Hospital and the chairperson of the SA Medical Association.

== Political career ==
Ramathuba is a long-standing member of the African National Congress. She serves as a member of the party's provincial executive committee. On 27 May 2015, Ramathuba was sworn in as a member of the Limpopo Provincial Legislature, representing the ANC. On the same day, premier Stanley Mathabatha appointed her Member of the Executive Council for Health, succeeding Maaria Ishmael Kgetjepe. The changes came into effect immediately.

Ramathuba was re-elected to the provincial legislature in the 2019 Limpopo provincial election held on 8 May. On 22 May 2019, Mathabatha announced that she would remain as Health MEC.

In January 2022, Ramathuba came under criticism for telling schoolgirls at the Gwenane Secondary School in Sekgakgapeng to "open your books and close your legs".

In August 2022 Ramathuba's remarks to a bed-ridden Zimbabwean patient in Bela-Bela, went viral. On the video she accused foreigners of abusing state resources allocated to South African Nationals stating: “you are killing my health system. When you guys are sick you just cross the Limpopo River, there’s an MEC there who is running a charity department.” Politicians such as EFF MP Mbuyiseni Ndlozi and Mmusi Maimane criticized Ramathuba for humiliating the patient and called for the revocation of her medical licence.

== Premiership ==
Following the 2024 national and provincial elections, the ANC named Ramathuba as the party's candidate to succeed Stanley Mathabatha as the Premier of Limpopo. She was elected during the first sitting of the 7th legislature, becoming the first woman to hold the office.

== Personal life ==
Ramathuba has two daughters. On 1 July 2020, Mathabatha announced that Ramathuba had tested positive for COVID-19.

== Corruption ==
Phophi Ramathuba dismisses corruption allegations in Mokgalakwena municipality.
