= Stan Mathabatha =

Premier of Limpopo from 2013 to 2024

The Honourable Stan Mathabatha MP
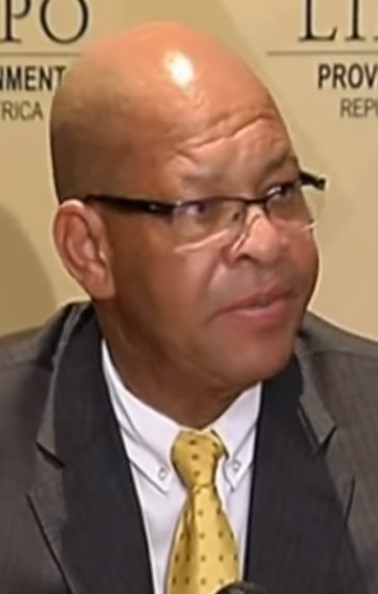

Deputy Minister of Land Reform and Rural Development
- Incumbent
- Assumed office 3 July 2024
- President: Cyril Ramaphosa
- Minister: Mzwanele Nyhontso
- Preceded by: Portfolio restructured

Member of the National Assembly
- Incumbent
- Assumed office 14 June 2024

4th Premier of Limpopo
- In office 18 July 2013 – 13 June 2024
- Preceded by: Cassel Mathale
- Succeeded by: Phophi Ramathuba

Provincial Chairperson of the Limpopo African National Congress
- Incumbent
- Assumed office 16 February 2014
- Deputy: Jerry Ndou; Florence Radzilani
- Preceded by: Cassel Mathale

Personal details
- Born: Chupu Stanley Mathabatha; 21 January 1957 (age 69) Sekhukhune, Transvaal; Union of South Africa
- Party: African National Congress
- Other political affiliations: South African Communist Party
- Education: University of the Western Cape University of Limpopo

Chupu Stanley Mathabatha (born 21 January 1957) is a South African politician who was the fourth Premier of Limpopo between July 2013 and June 2024. A member of the African National Congress (ANC), he has been the Deputy Minister of Land Reform and Rural Development since July 2024.

A former member of Umkhonto we Sizwe and the United Democratic Front, Mathabatha was a civil servant in Limpopo Province until 2010. Thereafter he completed a brief stint as a diplomat, serving as South African Ambassador to Ukraine under President Jacob Zuma from 2012 to 2013. He was elected as Premier of Limpopo in July 2013 after the resignation of Cassel Mathale, and he was elected as the Provincial Chairperson of the African National Congress (ANC) in Limpopo in February 2014.

Mathabatha was elected to a third four-year term as ANC Provincial Chairperson in June 2022. He is also a member of the Central Committee of the South African Communist Party.

Mathabatha resigned as ANC Limpopo Chairperson in September 2025.

== Early life and education ==
Chupu Stanley Mathabatha was born on 21 January 1957. He is from the Sekhukhune region of what is now the Limpopo province of South Africa; at the time of Mathabatha's birth, during apartheid, it was part of the Transvaal province.

He has a Bachelor's degree from the University of the Western Cape and a Master's degree in development from the University of Limpopo. He also attended an Executive Management Development Programme at Harvard University in 2003.

== Anti-apartheid activism ==
In his youth, Mathabatha became involved in anti-apartheid activism in the Northern Transvaal, particularly in Motetema, a township in the Lebowa bantustan on the outskirts of Grobersdal. In 1977, in the aftermath of the Soweto uprising, he joined Umkhonto weSizwe, the underground armed wing of the African National Congress (ANC). In the 1980s, he was active in the United Democratic Front (UDF); according to News24, he worked closely with Peter Mokaba, whom he later described as a "revered comrade", and with Frans Mohlala. He was also a member of the Motetema Youth Congress; of the Northern Transvaal Youth Congress; and of an ANC-aligned youth group known as the Young Lions of the North, which also included Cassel Mathale and others.

When the apartheid government unbanned the ANC and other political parties in 1990, Mathabatha helped establish the party's structures in the Northern Transvaal, becoming Treasurer of the Northern Transvaal region of the ANC in 1992. According to News24, he was also a member of the South African Communist Party (SACP) and helped the SACP establish its branches in the region.

== Career in the civil service: 1994–2013 ==
=== Public administration: 1994–2010 ===
After South Africa's first democratic election in 1994, Limpopo province (initially called Northern province) was formed in a merger of the governments of three former bantustans – Lebowa, Venda, and Gazankulu – with part of the government of the former Transvaal. Mathabatha entered the public administration sector, working in 1994 as the technical advisor to Limpopo's Member of the Executive Council for Finance and Economic Development. In subsequent years he remained in the Limpopo provincial Department of Finance and Economic Development, becoming General Manager of the Small, Medium and Micro-Enterprise Directorate by 2003. In March 2003, he was appointed chief operations officer of the Limpopo Economic Development Enterprise (LimDev), a state-owned development agency whose primary mandate was to provide development finance to small businesses in Limpopo. He became the agency's managing director in 2005.

=== Ambassadorship: 2012–2013 ===
Mathabatha left Limdev in 2010 to prepare to take up an ambassadorship. The Mail & Guardian reported in 2011 that he was undergoing diplomatic training and would be nominated to head South Africa's mission to Guinea-Conakry, but in 2012 President Jacob Zuma appointed him ambassador to Ukraine, in which capacity he was also non-resident ambassador to Armenia, Georgia, and Moldova.

== Premier of Limpopo: 2013–2024 ==
In July 2013, the ANC asked Cassel Mathale to resign as Premier of Limpopo, and the ANC-controlled Limpopo Provincial Legislature elected Mathabatha to replace him. He was sworn in as Premier on 18 July. In the Citizen's account, Mathabatha returned to South Africa after being "head-hunted" by President Zuma as a successor to Mathale. The Business Day said that Mathabatha was seen as "neutral" in the factional battles in the Limpopo ANC, and the provincial branch of the Congress of South African Trade Unions welcomed his appointment. The day after he took office, Mathabatha announced a major reshuffle in his Executive Council: he fired eight of Mathale's ten Members of the Executive Council (MECs).

Mathale was re-elected to full terms as premier after the 2014 and 2019 general elections.

=== Election as provincial chairperson ===
In February 2014, several months after his appointment as Premier, Mathabatha was elected Provincial Chairperson of the ANC in Limpopo. Jerry Ndou was elected as his deputy. He was re-elected unopposed in June 2018; Florence Radzilani replaced Ndou as Deputy Provincial Chairperson. At the provincial party's next elective conference in June 2022, Dickson Masemola, who had formerly been Deputy Provincial Chairperson under Cassel Mathale, launched a challenge to Mathabatha's incumbency. In the election, however, Mathabatha easily secured a third term as Provincial Chairperson, winning 781 votes to Masemola's 389. All the top leadership positions were won by candidates who had run on a Mathabatha-aligned slate – including Radzilani, who was re-elected his deputy.

While Provincial Chairperson, Mathabatha was perceived as a strong supporter of Cyril Ramaphosa, who also grew up in Limpopo. He was a key ally of Ramaphosa's successful campaign for election to the ANC presidency at the ANC's 54th National Conference in 2017, and was among the first ANC leaders publicly to pronounce support for Ramaphosa's re-election to a second term at the 55th National Conference in 2022: in January of that year, he praised Ramaphosa as a "son of the soil" and for having "brought the new dawn into the organisation [the ANC]".

Mathabatha is also a member of the ANC's Tripartite Alliance partner, the South African Communist Party (SACP). In July 2022, he was elected to a second five-year term as a member of the SACP Central Committee.

=== Bid for national chairmanship ===
Also in the run-up to the 55th National Conference, Mathabatha emerged as a serious competitor to incumbent ANC National Chairperson, Gwede Mantashe, who sought re-election to the post. When the national ANC released the list of nominations in November 2022, Mathabatha appeared to be the frontrunner for the National Chairperson position, having secured the support of a majority of local ANC branches in the provinces of Limpopo, KwaZulu-Natal, and the North West. An anonymous source told the Business Day that Mathabatha had sought re-election to the Provincial Chairperson position partly in order to bolster his campaign to gain a leadership position in the national ANC.

=== Tribalism controversy ===
Mathabatha was accused of regionalism and tribalism. Most prominently, this accusation was made in 2018 by Penny Penny, a Tsonga entertainer and local councillor who at the time was mounting an unsuccessful bid to oust Mathabatha from the ANC provincial chair. Penny Penny claimed, among other things, that none of Mathabatha's MECs were Shangaan-speaking. In 2020, the Citizen printed, without attribution, the claim that Mathabatha had displayed a regionalist or nepotist bias in appointing five people from his home region, Sekhukhune, to senior management positions in his office. Mathabatha denied the accusation on both occasions.

=== Departure ===
Mathabatha left the office at the 2024 general election, having reached the constitutional term limit. He was succeeded by Phophi Ramathuba on 14 June 2024.

== Career in national government: 2024–present ==
Mathabatha was elected to a seat in the National Assembly in the 2024 election, and on 30 June President Ramaphosa appointed him as Deputy Minister of Land Reform and Rural Development.

== Personal life ==
Mathabatha lives in the village of Tooseng in Ga-Mphahlele in Limpopo. His wife was the late Margaret Mathabatha, who had three children. She was born in Pretoria, Gauteng and was formerly a teacher and civil servant. In 2018, there was a mild scandal concerning a voice recording which reportedly recorded Mathabatha confessing romantic feelings towards Florence Radzilani, his deputy in the ANC.

In July 2025, at the age of 68, Mathabatha attended initiation school.
