= Limpopo Provincial Legislature =

South African legislature

Limpopo Provincial Legislature Limpopo provincial Legislature
- 7th Legislature

Type
- Type: Unicameral

Leadership
- Speaker: Makoma Makhurupetje, African National Congress since 14 June 2024
- Deputy Speaker: Tebogo Mamorobela, African National Congress since 14 June 2024
- Premier: Dr Phophi Ramathuba, African National Congress since 14 June 2024

Structure
- Seats: 64
- Political groups: Government (48): ANC (48); Official Opposition (9): EFF (9); Other parties (7): DA (4); FF+ (1); MK (1); UAT (1)

Elections
- Voting system: Party-list proportional representation
- Last election: 28 May 2024

Meeting place
- Government Complex, Lebowakgomo

Website
- Official website

The Limpopo Provincial Legislature is the primary legislative body of the South African province of Limpopo.

It is unicameral in its composition, and elects the premier and the provincial cabinet, the Limpopo Executive Council, from among the members of the leading party or coalition in the parliament.

The first legislature was inaugurated in May 1994 as the Northern Transvaal Provincial Legislature. It was renamed in 1995 to the Northern Province Provincial Legislature, and again in 2003 to the Limpopo Provincial Legislature.

The seventh legislature was elected on 29 May 2024 in South Africa's 2024 general election. The African National Congress maintained its majority and elected the speaker, deputy speaker and premier at its first sitting on 14 June 2024. Dr Phophi Ramathuba was elected the Premier of Limpopo Province, replacing Stanley Mathabatha who exhausted the term limit.

At the commencement of the 7th provincial legislature on 14 June 2024, the number of seats allocated to the Limpopo provincial legislature increased from 49 to 64.

== Powers ==
The Limpopo Legislature appoints the Premier of Limpopo, the head of Limpopo's provincial executive. The legislature can force the Premier to resign by passing a motion of no confidence. Although the Executive Council is selected by the Premier, the legislature may pass a motion of no confidence to force the Premier to restructure the Council. The legislature also appoints Limpopo's delegates to the National Council of Provinces, allocating delegates to parties in proportion to the number of seats each party holds in the legislature.

The legislature has the power to pass legislation in various fields stipulated in the national constitution; in some fields the legislative power is shared with the national parliament, while in others it is solely reserved to the province alone. The fields include health, education (except universities), agriculture, housing, environmental protection, and development planning.

The legislature oversees the administration of the Limpopo provincial government, and the Premier and the members of the Executive Council are required to report to the legislature on the performance of their responsibilities. The legislature also regulates the finances of the provincial government by way of the appropriation bills which determine the provincial budget.

== Election ==
The Provincial Legislature consists of 49 members, who are elected through a system of party list proportional representation with closed lists. In other words, each voter casts a vote for one political party, and seats in the legislature are allocated to the parties in proportion to the number of votes received. The seats are then filled by members in accordance with lists submitted by the parties before the election.

The Legislature is elected for a term of five years unless it is dissolved early. This may occur if the legislature votes to dissolve and it is at least three years since the last election, or if the Premiership falls vacant and the legislature fails to elect a new Premier within ninety days. By convention, all nine provincial legislatures and the National Assembly are elected on the same day.

The most recent election was held on 29 May 2024. The following table summarises the results.

Results by municipality ANC-50-60% ANC-60-70% ANC-70-80% ANC-80-90%

| Party | Votes | % | +/– | Seats | +/– |
|---|---|---|---|---|---|
| African National Congress | 1,037,627 | 73.30 | ▼1.19 | 48 | ▲10 |
| Economic Freedom Fighters | 199,900 | 14.12 | ▼0.31 | 9 | ▲2 |
| Democratic Alliance | 84,388 | 5.96 | ▲0.56 | 4 | ▲2 |
| Freedom Front Plus | 15,393 | 1.09 | ▼0.33 | 1 | Steady |
| uMkhonto we Sizwe | 12,027 | 0.85 | New | 1 | New |
| United Africans Transformation | 11,653 | 0.82 | New | 1 | New |
| ActionSA | 9,180 | 0.65 | New | 0 | New |
| African Christian Democratic Party | 4,810 | 0.34 | ▼0.37 | 0 | – |
| Action Alliance Development Party | 4,448 | 0.31 | New | 0 | New |
| Build One South Africa | 3,706 | 0.26 | New | 0 | New |
| Pan Africanist Congress | 3,332 | 0.24 | ▲0.09 | 0 | Steady |
| Bolsheviks Party of South Africa | 3,186 | 0.23 | ▲0.09 | 0 | Steady |
| African People's Convention | 2,692 | 0.19 | ▼0.17 | 0 | Steady |
| Congress of the People | 2,357 | 0.17 | ▼0.06 | 0 | Steady |
| Patriotic Alliance | 2,272 | 0.16 | New | 0 | New |
| Arise South Africa | 2,179 | 0.15 | New | 0 | New |
| Rise Mzansi | 2,123 | 0.15 | New | 0 | New |
| Able Leadership | 1,834 | 0.13 | New | 0 | New |
| Economic Liberators Forum South Africa | 1,655 | 0.12 | New | 0 | New |
| Forum for Service Delivery | 1,403 | 0.10 | New | 0 | New |
| Socialist Agenda of Dispossessed Africans | 1,300 | 0.09 | New | 0 | New |
| South African Maintenance and Estate Beneficiaries Association | 1,242 | 0.09 | New | 0 | New |
| African Transformation Movement | 1,204 | 0.09 | ▼0.19 | 0 | Steady |
| United Democratic Movement | 905 | 0.06 | ▼0.03 | 0 | Steady |
| Inkatha Freedom Party | 890 | 0.06 | ▲0.01 | 0 | Steady |
| Operation Dudula | 736 | 0.05 | New | 0 | New |
| South African Rainbow Alliance | 686 | 0.05 | New | 0 | New |
| All Citizens Party | 637 | 0.04 | New | 0 | New |
| National Independent Party | 439 | 0.03 | New | 0 | New |
| Lovemore N'dou | 425 | 0.03 | New | 0 | New |
| Good | 317 | 0.02 | ▼0.01 | 0 | Steady |
| Makonyane Matsobane Gerald | 277 | 0.02 | New | 0 | New |
| Al Jama-ah | 243 | 0.02 | New | 0 | New |
| African Movement Congress | 129 | 0.01 | New | 0 | New |
| Total | 1,415,595 | 100.00 | – | 64 | – |
| Valid votes | 1,415,595 | 99.04 | | | |
| Invalid/blank votes | 13,791 | 0.96 | | | |
| Total votes | 1,429,386 | 100.00 | | | |
| Registered voters/turnout | 2,779,657 | 51.42 | | | |
Source: Independent Electoral Commission, Daily Maverick and News24

=== Previous results ===
Prior to 2024, the last election held on 8 May 2019. The following table summarises 6th legislature elections results.

| Party | Votes | Vote % | Seats |
|---|---|---|---|
| African National Congress | 1,096,300 | 75.49 | 38 |
| Economic Freedom Fighters | 209,488 | 14.43 | 7 |
| DA | 78,360 | 5.40 | 3 |
| VF+ | 20,572 | 1.42 | 1 |
| Other parties | 47,438 | 3.26 | 0 |
| Total | 1,452,158 | 100.0 | 49 |

The following table shows the composition of the provincial parliament after past elections.

| Event | ACDP | ANC | COPE | DP/DA | EFF | FF/FF+ | NP/NNP | PAC |
|---|---|---|---|---|---|---|---|---|
| 1994 election | 0 | 38 | — | 0 | — | 1 | 1 | 0 |
| 1999 election | 1 | 44 | — | 1 | — | 1 | 1 | 1 |
| 2004 election | 1 | 45 | — | 2 | — | 1 | 0 | 0 |
| 2009 election | 0 | 43 | 4 | 2 | — | 0 | 0 | 0 |
| 2014 election | 0 | 39 | 1 | 3 | 6 | 0 | 0 | 0 |
| 2019 election | 0 | 38 | 0 | 3 | 7 | 1 | 0 | 0 |

== Officers ==
The current speaker of the legislature is Makoma Makhurupetje, while the deputy speaker is Tebogo Mamorobela.

| Name | Entered office | Left office | Party |
|---|---|---|---|
| T.G. Mashamba | 1994 | 1999 | ANC |
| Robert Malavi | 1999 | 2004 | ANC |
| Tshenuwani Farisani | 2004 | 2009 | ANC |
| Rudolph Phala | 2009 | 2013 | ANC |
| Kwena Elias Nong | 2013 | 2014 | ANC |
| Merriam Ramadwa | 2014 | 2015 | ANC |
| Polly Boshielo | 2015 | 2019 | ANC |
| Mavhungu Lerule-Ramakhanya | 2019 | 2020 | ANC |
| Rosemary Molapo | 2020 | 2024 | ANC |
| Makoma Makhurupetje | 2024 | Incumbent | ANC |
