= List of municipalities in Limpopo =

Limpopo province of South Africa is divided, for single megalopolis at Vuwani and metropolis government purposes, into five district municipalities which are in turn divided into twenty-two metropolitan municipalities.

In the following map, the district municipalities are labelled in capital letters and shaded in various different colours.

== District municipalities ==
Name	Code	Seat	Area (km^{2})	Population (2016)	Pop. density (per km^{2})
Capricorn District Municipality	DC35	Polokwane	21,705	1,330,436	61.3
Mopani District Municipality	DC33	Giyani	20,011	1,159,185	57.9
Sekhukhune District Municipality	DC47	Groblersdal	13,528	1,169,762	86.5
Vhembe District Municipality	DC34	Thohoyandou	25,596	1,393,949	54.5
Waterberg District Municipality	DC36	Modimolle	44,913	745,758	16.6

== Local municipalities ==
Name	Code	District	Seat	Area (km^{2})	Population (2016)	Pop. density (per km^{2})
Ba-Phalaborwa Local Municipality	LIM334	Mopani	Phalaborwa	7,489	168,937	22.6
Bela-Bela Local Municipality	LIM366	Waterberg	Bela-Bela	3,406	76,296	22.4
Blouberg Local Municipality	LIM351	Capricorn	Senwabarwana	9,540	172,601	18.1
Collins Chabane Local Municipality	LIM345	Vhembe	Malamulele	5,003	347,974	69.6
Elias Motsoaledi Local Municipality	LIM472	Sekhukhune	Groblersdal	3,713	268,256	72.2
Ephraim Mogale Local Municipality	LIM471	Sekhukhune	Marble Hall	2,011	127,168	63.2
Fetakgomo Tubatse Local Municipality	LIM476	Sekhukhune	Apel	5,693	489,902	86.0
Greater Giyani Local Municipality	LIM331	Mopani	Giyani	4,172	256,127	61.4
Greater Letaba Local Municipality	LIM332	Mopani	Modjadjiskloof	1,891	218,030	115.3
Greater Tzaneen Local Municipality	LIM333	Mopani	Tzaneen	2,897	416,146	143.7
Lepelle-Nkumpi Local Municipality	LIM355	Capricorn	Chuniespoort	3,484	235,380	67.6
Lephalale Local Municipality	LIM362	Waterberg	Lephalale	13,794	140,240	10.2
Makhado Local Municipality	LIM344	Vhembe	Louis Trichardt	7,605	416,728	54.8
Makhuduthamaga Local Municipality	LIM473	Sekhukhune	Jane Furse	2,110	284,435	134.8
Maruleng Local Municipality	LIM335	Mopani	Hoedspruit	3,563	99,946	28.1
Modimolle–Mookgophong Local Municipality	LIM368	Waterberg	Modimolle	10,367	107,699	10.4
Mogalakwena Local Municipality	LIM367	Waterberg	Mokopane	6,156	325,291	52.8
Molemole Local Municipality	LIM353	Capricorn	Dendron	3,628	125,327	34.5
Musina Local Municipality	LIM341	Vhembe	Musina	10,347	132,009	12.8
Polokwane Local Municipality	LIM354	Capricorn	Polokwane	5,054	797,127	157.7
Thabazimbi Local Municipality	LIM361	Waterberg	Thabazimbi	11,190	96,232	8.6
Thulamela Local Municipality	LIM343	Vhembe	Thohoyandou	2,642	497,237	188.2

== Former municipalities ==
These municipalities have been dissolved since the current system of local government was established in 2000.

Name	Code	Dissolved	Fate
Bohlabela District Municipality	CBDC4	1 March 2006	Annexed by Ehlanzeni and Mopani District Municipalities
Mutale Local Municipality	LIM342	3 August 2016	Annexed by Musina and Thulamela Local Municipalities
Aganang Local Municipality	LIM352	3 August 2016	Annexed by Blouberg, Molemole and Polokwane Local Municipalities
Mookgopong Local Municipality	LIM364	3 August 2016	Merged to create Modimolle–Mookgophong Local Municipality
Modimolle Local Municipality	LIM365	3 August 2016	Merged to create Modimolle–Mookgophong Local Municipality
Fetakgomo Local Municipality	LIM474	3 August 2016	Merged to create Fetakgomo Tubatse Local Municipality
Greater Tubatse Local Municipality	LIM475	3 August 2016	Merged to create Fetakgomo Tubatse Local Municipality
