= Ga-Riba =

Ga-Riba Ga-Makgatha
- Location within Limpopo Location within South Africa
- Coordinates: 24.552°S 30.223°E
- Country: South Africa
- Province: Limpopo
- District: Sekhukhune
- Municipality: Fetakgomo Tubatse

Area
  - Total: 6.18 km^{2} (2.39 sq mi)

Population (2011)
  - Total: 3,073
  - Density: 497/km^{2} (1,290/sq mi)

Racial makeup (2011)
  - Black African: 99.9%
  - Other: 0.1%

First languages (2011)
  - Northern Sotho: 91.4%
  - S. Ndebele: 5.0%
  - Other: 3.5%
- Time zone: UTC+2 (SAST)

Ga Riba is a village located in the Bushveld Complex in Fetakgomo Tubatse Local Municipality in the Limpopo province of South Africa.

The village, like many other villages in the Limpopo province, was named after its traditional leader (chief), Kgoshi Riba. The village is situated 20 km from Burgersfort town and 16 km from Steelpoort.

The current traditional leader of the village is Kgoshigadi Setlogago Gertrude Riba, "Hunadi 'a Ngwato", who succeeded her late husband Kgoshi Lehlaba Jonathan Riba, "Phogole 'a Bauba", when he died in 2006. The father of Jonathan was Kgoshi Boas Morewane Riba, "Bauba", who led the village for a long time under different governments. He was one of the few leaders to allow his son to succeed him while he was still alive in 1982. He had the opportunity to guide and supervise him during his reign.

Kgoshi Riba LJ acted as advisor in the office of South Africa's Minister of Agriculture during his reign and while he was still a member of the Lebowa Parliament. Kgoshigadi Riba SG is believed to be succeeded by her son, Phaswane Riba, "Mahlatji 'a Phogole". Ga Riba, currently, has at least 5 headmen and 1 headwoman, namely Hlabirwa Riba (Riba Cross), Funani Riba (Polaseng Madithongwane), Malome Riba (Matsiyaneng), Modupi Riba (Mabocha), Tjie (Ga Modupi) and Joyce Riba (Driekop), and Moshate is administered through Bakoni Phuti Traditional Council.

The main villages under the jurisdiction of Kgoshigadi Riba SG are Riba Cross, Mashampthane, Kampeng (Driekop), Mareseleng, Mabocha and Moshate ("ka thabeng" or "Ga Makgatha"). But sadly, many of Bakoni have had to leave these villages to live closer to services such as electricity, schools, proper roads and so on.

The village has grown exponentially despite the fact that many of its children have descended the mountain and resettled in places like Praktiseer, Burgersfort, Makgemeng, etc.

Initially the village was served by one primary school called Ntepane Primary School which for a long time was led by Principal Ramaepadi during kgoshi Morewane's reign. Access to schools was later improved when the community at Ga Modupi initiated the building of another primary school called Tantanyane Primary School which was assigned to the leadership of Ms Asa Riba who was commonly known as Mistress Riba. She was one of the longest serving teachers in the community who taught the many generations of children. Letau High School opened its doors officially in the early eighties after it started operating on the premises of Ntepane High School. Its inception Principal was Mr Kgoale who was assisted by only one teacher Mr Ishmael Marebane who also later became a Principal at another school.
