= Greater Tubatse Local Municipality =

Fetakgomo Tubatse
- Local municipality
- Seal

- Location in Limpopo
- Coordinates: 24°40′S 30°20′E
- Country: South Africa
- Province: Limpopo
- District: Sekhukhune
- Seat: Burgersfort
- Wards: 31

Government
  - Type: Municipal council
  - Mayor: Ralepane Mammekwa

Area
  - Total: 4,602 km^{2} (1,777 sq mi)

Population (2011)
  - Total: 335,676
  - Density: 72.94/km^{2} (188.9/sq mi)

Racial makeup (2011)
  - Black African: 98.3%
  - Coloured: 0.2%
  - Indian/Asian: 0.2%
  - White: 1.3%

First languages (2011)
  - Northern Sotho: 88.1%
  - Swazi: 2.6%
  - Zulu: 1.7%
  - Afrikaans: 1.5%
  - Other: 6.1%
- Time zone: UTC+2 (SAST)
- Municipal code: LIM475

Fetakgomo Tubatse Local Municipality is located in the Sekhukhune District Municipality of Limpopo province, South Africa. In 2016, 3 August, it was merged with the Fetakgomo Local Municipality to form the Fetakgomo Tubatse Local Municipality.

== Main places ==
The 2001 census divided the municipality into the following main places:

Place	Code	Area (km^{2})	Population	Most spoken language
Babina Naare Ba Kgoete	98501	323.41	354	Northern Sotho
Badimong	88501	181.27	10,653	Northern Sotho
Burgersfort	88502	23.67	1,578	Northern Sotho
Doornbosch Mine	88503	0.27	406	Swazi
Lavino Chrome Mine	88505	1.05	87	Afrikaans
Magnetite Mine	88506	1.66	30	Northern Sotho
Marota	98502	61.47	0	-
Matlala a Dinkwanyane	98503	44.07	24	Northern Sotho
Monganeng	88507	95.74	1,048	Northern Sotho
Montrose Mine	88508	1.12	225	Afrikaans
Motodi	98504	0.56	467	Northern Sotho
Naphuno	98505	46.42	0	-
Ohrigstad	88509	8.76	202	Northern Sotho
Penge	98506	6.52	1,257	Northern Sotho
SD	98507	871.71	87,790	Northern Sotho
Sealane	98508	4.06	939	Northern Sotho
Sekhukhuneland	98509	891.98	142,126	Northern Sotho
Soe	88510	59.23	13,931	Northern Sotho
Steelpoort	88511	8.83	1,101	Northern Sotho
Winterveld Mine	88512	1.35	1,076	Northern Sotho
Remainder of the municipality	88504	1,954.82	6,855	Northern Sotho

== Politics ==
The municipal council consists of sixty-two members elected by mixed-member proportional representation. Thirty-one councillors are elected by first-past-the-post voting in thirty-one wards, while the remaining thirty-one are chosen from party lists so that the total number of party representatives is proportional to the number of votes received. In the election of 18 May 2011, the African National Congress (ANC) won a majority of fifty seats on the council.

The following table shows the results of the election.

Party	Votes				Seats		
Party	Ward	List	Total	%	Ward	List	Total
ANC	41,389	45,052	86,441	77.8	29	21	50
Independent	6,308	–	6,308	5.7	2	–	2
DA	2,859	2,949	5,808	5.2	0	3	3
COPE	2,464	3,154	5,618	5.1	0	3	3
PAC	1,783	1,779	3,562	3.2	0	2	2
APC	612	693	1,305	1.2	0	1	1
UDM	231	772	1,003	0.9	0	1	1
AZAPO	317	563	880	0.8	0	0	0
South African Maintenance and Estate Beneficiaries Association	19	107	126	0.1	0	0	0
Total	55,982	55,069	111,051	100.0	31	31	62
Spoilt votes	1,175	2,186	3,361				
