= Makhuduthamaga Local Municipality elections =

South African municipal elections

The Makhuduthamaga Local Municipality is a Local Municipality in Limpopo, South Africa. The council consists of sixty-two members elected by mixed-member proportional representation. Thirty-one councillors are elected by first-past-the-post voting in thirty-one wards, while the remaining thirty-one are chosen from party lists so that the total number of party representatives is proportional to the number of votes received. In the election of 1 November 2021. The African National Congress (ANC) won a majority of 40 seats on the council.

== Results ==
The following table shows the composition of the council after past elections.

Event	ANC	AZAPO	DA	EFF	PAC	SAMEBA	Other	Total
2000 election	47	1	2	—	2	—	4	56
2006 election	54	1	2	—	1	—	3	61
2011 election	52	2	1	—	1	1	4	61
2016 election	43	1	2	14	0	1	1	61
2021 election	40	0	1	15	0	2	4	62

== December 2000 election ==
The following table shows the results of the 2000 election.

Party	Ward			List			Total seats
Party	Votes	%	Seats	Votes	%	Seats	Total seats
African National Congress	34,356	86.16	28	33,428	83.83	19	47
United Democratic Movement	2,678	6.72	0	2,463	6.18	4	4
Pan Africanist Congress of Azania	1,132	2.84	0	1,693	4.25	2	2
Democratic Alliance	1,114	2.79	0	1,422	3.57	2	2
Azanian People's Organisation	596	1.49	0	870	2.18	1	1
Total	39,876	100.00	28	39,876	100.00	28	56
Valid votes	39,876	97.60		39,876	97.55		
Invalid/blank votes	980	2.40		1,001	2.45		
Total votes	40,856	100.00		40,877	100.00		
Registered voters/turnout	98,527	41.47		98,527	41.49		

== March 2006 election ==
The following table shows the results of the 2006 election.

Party	Ward			List			Total seats
Party	Votes	%	Seats	Votes	%	Seats	Total seats
African National Congress	40,981	85.99	29	42,131	90.84	25	54
Independent candidates	2,777	5.83	2				2
Democratic Alliance	1,132	2.38	0	1,041	2.24	2	2
United Independent Front	1,091	2.29	0	1,010	2.18	1	1
Azanian People's Organisation	926	1.94	0	841	1.81	1	1
Pan Africanist Congress of Azania	738	1.55	0	754	1.63	1	1
United Democratic Movement	14	0.03	0	604	1.30	0	0
Total	47,659	100.00	31	46,381	100.00	30	61
Valid votes	47,659	98.12		46,381	95.80		
Invalid/blank votes	912	1.88		2,034	4.20		
Total votes	48,571	100.00		48,415	100.00		
Registered voters/turnout	111,628	43.51		111,628	43.37		

== May 2011 election ==
The following table shows the results of the 2011 election.

Party	Ward			List			Total seats
Party	Votes	%	Seats	Votes	%	Seats	Total seats
African National Congress	43,347	78.14	31	46,896	85.58	21	52
Congress of the People	2,756	4.97	0	3,178	5.80	3	3
Independent candidates	4,973	8.96	0				0
Azanian People's Organisation	1,349	2.43	0	1,369	2.50	2	2
Democratic Alliance	1,050	1.89	0	1,239	2.26	1	1
African People's Convention	638	1.15	0	590	1.08	1	1
Pan Africanist Congress of Azania	536	0.97	0	561	1.02	1	1
South African Maintenance and Estate Beneficiaries Association	428	0.77	0	495	0.90	1	1
African Christian Democratic Party	267	0.48	0	302	0.55	0	0
United Democratic Movement	129	0.23	0	168	0.31	0	0
Total	55,473	100.00	31	54,798	100.00	30	61
Valid votes	55,473	97.97		54,798	97.04		
Invalid/blank votes	1,152	2.03		1,670	2.96		
Total votes	56,625	100.00		56,468	100.00		
Registered voters/turnout	117,870	48.04		117,870	47.91		

== August 2016 election ==
The following table shows the results of the 2016 election.

Party	Ward			List			Total seats
Party	Votes	%	Seats	Votes	%	Seats	Total seats
African National Congress	42,671	67.75	31	42,667	68.15	12	43
Economic Freedom Fighters	13,652	21.68	0	13,641	21.79	14	14
Democratic Alliance	2,157	3.42	0	2,102	3.36	2	2
African People's Socialist Party	1,130	1.79	0	1,068	1.71	1	1
Azanian People's Organisation	718	1.14	0	780	1.25	1	1
South African Maintenance and Estate Beneficiaries Association	706	1.12	0	711	1.14	1	1
Independent candidates	931	1.48	0				0
African People's Convention	19	0.03	0	515	0.82	0	0
Pan Africanist Congress of Azania	246	0.39	0	168	0.27	0	0
United Democratic Movement	152	0.24	0	165	0.26	0	0
United Christian Democratic Party	175	0.28	0	134	0.21	0	0
Community Congress	162	0.26	0	127	0.20	0	0
Sekhukhune Congress				212	0.34	0	0
Socialist Radical Change	16	0.03	0	171	0.27	0	0
Congress of the People	133	0.21	0				0
Liberators Party	36	0.06	0	65	0.10	0	0
Pan African Socialist Movement of Azania	45	0.07	0	36	0.06	0	0
Agang South Africa	30	0.05	0	42	0.07	0	0
Total	62,979	100.00	31	62,604	100.00	31	62
Valid votes	62,979	98.33		62,604	98.00		
Invalid/blank votes	1,070	1.67		1,276	2.00		
Total votes	64,049	100.00		63,880	100.00		
Registered voters/turnout	127,687	50.16		127,687	50.03		

== November 2021 election ==
The following table shows the results of the 2021 election.

Party	Ward			List			Total seats
Party	Votes	%	Seats	Votes	%	Seats	Total seats
African National Congress	32,923	60.23	30	35,027	65.34	10	40
Economic Freedom Fighters	12,201	22.32	0	13,126	24.49	15	15
Independent candidates	4,531	8.29	1				1
South African Maintenance and Estate Beneficiaries Association	1,380	2.52	0	1,171	2.18	2	2
Democratic Alliance	858	1.57	0	929	1.73	1	1
National Communist Congress	773	1.41	0	751	1.40	1	1
Socialist Agenda of Dispossessed Africans	270	0.49	0	291	0.54	1	1
Democratic Artists Party	254	0.46	0	284	0.53	1	1
Azanian People's Organisation	193	0.35	0	243	0.45	0	0
African People's Socialist Party	199	0.36	0	199	0.37	0	0
African Christian Democratic Party	178	0.33	0	206	0.38	0	0
African People's Convention	200	0.37	0	128	0.24	0	0
Congress of the People	143	0.26	0	153	0.29	0	0
United Christian Democratic Party	50	0.09	0	205	0.38	0	0
Forum for Service Delivery	66	0.12	0	181	0.34	0	0
Pan Africanist Congress of Azania	98	0.18	0	146	0.27	0	0
Inkatha Freedom Party	42	0.08	0	199	0.37	0	0
Bolsheviks Party of South Africa	67	0.12	0	106	0.20	0	0
Patriotic Alliance	71	0.13	0	101	0.19	0	0
African Transformation Movement	47	0.09	0	90	0.17	0	0
Defenders of the People	40	0.07	0	70	0.13	0	0
United Democratic Movement	74	0.14	0				0
Total	54,658	100.00	31	53,606	100.00	31	62
Valid votes	54,658	98.27		53,606	97.10		
Invalid/blank votes	965	1.73		1,602	2.90		
Total votes	55,623	100.00		55,208	100.00		
Registered voters/turnout	127,638	43.58		127,638	43.25		
