= Thabo Makunyane =

South African politician (1953–2020)

Delegate to the National Council of Provinces

Assembly Member for Limpopo
- In office 22 May 2012 – 21 April 2014

Mayor of Polokwane Local Municipality
- In office December 2000 – 31 August 2010
- Preceded by: Position established
- Succeeded by: Freddy Greaver

Member of the National Assembly
- In office June 1999 – 5 December 2000
- Constituency: Northern Province

Personal details
- Born: Thabo Lucas Makunyane; 25 October 1953
- Died: 11 June 2020 (aged 66)
- Citizenship: South Africa
- Party: African National Congress
- Education: University of the North

Thabo Lucas Makunyane (25 October 1953 – 11 June 2020) was a South African politician and former anti-apartheid activist. He was the first mayor of Limpopo's Polokwane Local Municipality from 2000 to 2010. He also served in the National Assembly from 1999 to 2000 and in the National Council of Provinces from 2012 to 2014.

Makunyane rose to prominence in the students' movement of the 1970s, which led him to join the African National Congress (ANC) underground and become a founding member of the Congress of South African Students (COSAS). With COSAS president Ephraim Mogale, he was imprisoned on Robben Island from 1979 to 1985. Upon his release, Makunyane became vice-chairperson of the Northern Transvaal branch of the United Democratic Front (UDF), in which capacity he suffered another lengthy detention from 1986 to 1989.

== Early life and activism ==
Born on 25 October 1953, Makunyane became active in anti-apartheid politics in the early 1970s through the Black Consciousness-aligned South African Students Organisation. He went on to join the underground of the ANC, which was outlawed at the time; he later said that he had joined the party in 1973. In 1979, while studying law at Turfloop, he was involved in founding the ANC-aligned COSAS with Ephraim Mogale. Later in 1979, he and Mogale were arrested in Venda; they were convicted of political offences and sentenced to five years' imprisonment, which they served on Robben Island.

Upon his release in 1985, Makunyane joined the UDF in the Northern Transvaal, while subsisting on business interests he acquired in Sekhukhuneland and Seshego. After Peter Nchabeleng died in police detention in 1986, Louis Mnguni succeeded Nchabeleng as chairperson of the UDF's Northern Transvaal branch, and Makunyane in turn succeeded Mnguni as vice-chairperson. During the state of emergency that began later that year, both Mnguni and Makunyane were detained without trial for three years. After his release in 1989, Makunyane once more resumed his activism, becoming the key coordinator of the ANC underground in the Pietersburg area.

== Post-apartheid political career ==
=== National Assembly: 1999–2000 ===
In the 1999 general election, Makunyane was elected to an ANC seat in the National Assembly, where he represented the Northern Province constituency (present-day Limpopo). While he was serving in the seat, he stood as a candidate in the 2000 local elections. He resigned from the National Assembly on 5 December 2000, in the aftermath of the election, in order to take up the seat he had won as a local councillor.

=== Mayor of Polokwane: 2000–2010 ===
After his departure from the National Assembly in December 2000, Makunyane was sworn in as the inaugural executive mayor of Limpopo's newly incorporated Polokwane Local Municipality. He was re-elected in the 2006 local elections and remained in the mayoral office until 31 August 2010, when he resigned "to attend to urgent matters". The Sowetan reported that he was likely to be appointed as the head of the ANC's political school in Limpopo. He was succeeded as mayor by Freddy Greaver.

=== National Council of Provinces: 2012–2014 ===
On 22 May 2012, Makunyane was sworn in to an ANC seat in the Limpopo caucus of the National Council of Provinces, where he filled a casual vacancy. He served in the seat until the 2014 general election.

== Personal life and death ==
Makunyane had six children. He died on 11 June 2020.
