= Elias Motsoaledi Local Municipality elections =

The Elias Motsoaledi Local Municipality is a Local Municipality in Limpopo, South Africa. The council consists of sixty-one members elected by mixed-member proportional representation. Thirty-one councillors are elected by first-past-the-post voting in thirty-one wards, while the remaining thirty are chosen from party lists so that the total number of party representatives is proportional to the number of votes received. In the election of 1 November 2021 the African National Congress (ANC) won a majority of 36 seats.

== Results ==
The following table shows the composition of the council after past elections.

Event	ANC	AZAPO	BPSA	DA	EFF	MP	Other	Total
2006 election	45	4	—	5	—	—	2	57
2011 election	41	1	—	4	—	12	2	60
2016 election	41	0	3	5	10	1	1	61
2021 election	36	0	2	4	14	2	3	61

== March 2006 election ==
The following table shows the results of the 2006 election.

Party	Ward			List			Total seats
Party	Votes	%	Seats	Votes	%	Seats	Total seats
African National Congress	31,007	74.37	28	31,600	76.41	17	45
Democratic Alliance	3,518	8.44	1	3,437	8.31	4	5
Azanian People's Organisation	2,018	4.84	0	3,893	9.41	4	4
Independent candidates	3,261	7.82	0				0
Pan Africanist Congress of Azania	955	2.29	0	1,206	2.92	1	1
United Independent Front	274	0.66	0	700	1.69	1	1
Black Consciousness Party	321	0.77	0	522	1.26	1	1
United Democratic Movement	338	0.81	0				0
Total	41,692	100.00	29	41,358	100.00	28	57
Valid votes	41,692	96.87		41,358	96.73		
Invalid/blank votes	1,349	3.13		1,397	3.27		
Total votes	43,041	100.00		42,755	100.00		
Registered voters/turnout	105,334	40.86		105,334	40.59		

== May 2011 election ==
The following table shows the results of the 2011 election.

Party	Ward			List			Total seats
Party	Votes	%	Seats	Votes	%	Seats	Total seats
African National Congress	36,704	65.97	25	37,948	68.29	16	41
Mpumalanga Party	10,557	18.97	4	10,592	19.06	8	12
Democratic Alliance	3,662	6.58	1	3,493	6.29	3	4
Congress of the People	1,077	1.94	0	1,087	1.96	1	1
African People's Convention	926	1.66	0	728	1.31	1	1
Azanian People's Organisation	520	0.93	0	472	0.85	1	1
Independent candidates	903	1.62	0				0
Independent Residents Association	380	0.68	0	366	0.66	0	0
Pan Africanist Congress of Azania	405	0.73	0	332	0.60	0	0
United Democratic Movement	232	0.42	0	178	0.32	0	0
African Christian Democratic Party	150	0.27	0	185	0.33	0	0
South African Maintenance and Estate Beneficiaries Association	76	0.14	0	99	0.18	0	0
Black Consciousness Party	45	0.08	0	88	0.16	0	0
Total	55,637	100.00	30	55,568	100.00	30	60
Valid votes	55,637	97.47		55,568	97.40		
Invalid/blank votes	1,444	2.53		1,486	2.60		
Total votes	57,081	100.00		57,054	100.00		
Registered voters/turnout	110,685	51.57		110,685	51.55		

== August 2016 election ==
The following table shows the results of the 2016 election.

Party	Ward			List			Total seats
Party	Votes	%	Seats	Votes	%	Seats	Total seats
African National Congress	39,477	64.38	30	40,465	66.41	11	41
Economic Freedom Fighters	10,136	16.53	0	10,245	16.81	10	10
Democratic Alliance	4,548	7.42	1	4,614	7.57	4	5
Bolsheviks Party of South Africa	2,376	3.88	0	2,722	4.47	3	3
Independent candidates	2,301	3.75	0				0
Mpumalanga Party	737	1.20	0	647	1.06	1	1
South African Maintenance and Estate Beneficiaries Association	451	0.74	0	517	0.85	1	1
African People's Convention	116	0.19	0	449	0.74	0	0
African Christian Democratic Party	258	0.42	0	166	0.27	0	0
Answer for Community	230	0.38	0	166	0.27	0	0
Pan Africanist Congress of Azania	194	0.32	0	159	0.26	0	0
Azanian People's Organisation	178	0.29	0	171	0.28	0	0
United Christian Democratic Party	112	0.18	0	132	0.22	0	0
African People's Socialist Party	106	0.17	0	132	0.22	0	0
Congress of the People	31	0.05	0	142	0.23	0	0
Sindawonye Progressive Party	35	0.06	0	134	0.22	0	0
Badira Mmogo Freedom Party	30	0.05	0	68	0.11	0	0
Total	61,316	100.00	31	60,929	100.00	30	61
Valid votes	61,316	98.29		60,929	97.86		
Invalid/blank votes	1,069	1.71		1,335	2.14		
Total votes	62,385	100.00		62,264	100.00		
Registered voters/turnout	121,169	51.49		121,169	51.39		

== November 2021 election ==
The following table shows the results of the 2021 election.

Party	Ward			List			Total seats
Party	Votes	%	Seats	Votes	%	Seats	Total seats
African National Congress	27,547	57.80	27	27,729	58.66	9	36
Economic Freedom Fighters	10,110	21.21	3	10,395	21.99	11	14
Democratic Alliance	2,984	6.26	1	3,063	6.48	3	4
Bolsheviks Party of South Africa	1,612	3.38	0	1,573	3.33	2	2
Mpumalanga Party	1,419	2.98	0	1,544	3.27	2	2
Freedom Front Plus	860	1.80	0	782	1.65	1	1
Independent candidates	1,006	2.11	0				0
Answer for Community	468	0.98	0	441	0.93	1	1
Dennilton Residents Association	351	0.74	0	330	0.70	1	1
Movement for African Convention	201	0.42	0	281	0.59	0	0
South African Maintenance and Estate Beneficiaries Association	231	0.48	0	234	0.50	0	0
Defenders of the People	136	0.29	0	147	0.31	0	0
African Christian Democratic Party	126	0.26	0	137	0.29	0	0
African People's Convention	105	0.22	0	109	0.23	0	0
African Transformation Movement	102	0.21	0	105	0.22	0	0
United Christian Democratic Party	85	0.18	0	86	0.18	0	0
Azanian People's Organisation	73	0.15	0	86	0.18	0	0
African People's Socialist Party	106	0.22	0	43	0.09	0	0
Democratic Artists Party	42	0.09	0	74	0.16	0	0
Patriotic Alliance	59	0.12	0	57	0.12	0	0
United Democratic Movement	36	0.08	0	56	0.12	0	0
Total	47,659	100.00	31	47,272	100.00	30	61
Valid votes	47,659	98.05		47,272	97.67		
Invalid/blank votes	950	1.95		1,126	2.33		
Total votes	48,609	100.00		48,398	100.00		
Registered voters/turnout	120,057	40.49		120,057	40.31		

=== By-elections from November 2021 ===
The following by-elections were held to fill vacant ward seats in the period since the election in November 2021.

Date	Ward	Party of the previous councillor	Party of the newly elected councillor
11 Dec 2024	30	Economic Freedom Fighters	African National Congress
