= Ephraim Mogale Local Municipality elections =

The Ephraim Mogale Local Municipality is a Local Municipality in Limpopo, South Africa. The council consists of thirty-two members elected by mixed-member proportional representation. Sixteen councillors are elected by first-past-the-post voting in sixteen wards, while the remaining sixteen are chosen from party lists so that the total number of party representatives is proportional to the number of votes received. In the election of 1 November 2021 the African National Congress (ANC) won a majority of 19 seats.

== Results ==
The following table shows the composition of the council after past elections.

Event	ANC	DA	EFF	FF+	PAC	Other	Total
2006 election	24	2	—	0	1	0	27
2011 election	23	2	—	—	1	6	32
2016 election	20	3	7	1	0	1	32
2021 election	19	2	7	1	0	3	32

== March 2006 election ==
The following table shows the results of the 2006 election.

Party	Ward			List			Total seats
Party	Votes	%	Seats	Votes	%	Seats	Total seats
African National Congress	20,779	87.04	14	20,865	87.21	10	24
Democratic Alliance	1,708	7.15	0	1,592	6.65	2	2
Pan Africanist Congress of Azania	675	2.83	0	634	2.65	1	1
Freedom Front Plus	330	1.38	0	235	0.98	0	0
Azanian People's Organisation	245	1.03	0	254	1.06	0	0
United Independent Front	137	0.57	0	346	1.45	0	0
Total	23,874	100.00	14	23,926	100.00	13	27
Valid votes	23,874	97.72		23,926	97.77		
Invalid/blank votes	556	2.28		546	2.23		
Total votes	24,430	100.00		24,472	100.00		
Registered voters/turnout	51,936	47.04		51,936	47.12		

== May 2011 election ==
The following table shows the results of the 2011 election.

Party	Ward			List			Total seats
Party	Votes	%	Seats	Votes	%	Seats	Total seats
African National Congress	17,424	65.93	14	18,981	73.76	9	23
Mpumalanga Party	2,325	8.80	0	2,837	11.02	3	3
Independent candidates	3,819	14.45	2				2
Democratic Alliance	1,603	6.07	0	1,742	6.77	2	2
Congress of the People	571	2.16	0	923	3.59	1	1
Pan Africanist Congress of Azania	407	1.54	0	449	1.74	1	1
Azanian People's Organisation	188	0.71	0	635	2.47	0	0
South African Maintenance and Estate Beneficiaries Association	92	0.35	0	167	0.65	0	0
Total	26,429	100.00	16	25,734	100.00	16	32
Valid votes	26,429	97.05		25,734	94.40		
Invalid/blank votes	804	2.95		1,528	5.60		
Total votes	27,233	100.00		27,262	100.00		
Registered voters/turnout	54,570	49.90		54,570	49.96		

== August 2016 election ==
The following table shows the results of the 2016 election.

Party	Ward			List			Total seats
Party	Votes	%	Seats	Votes	%	Seats	Total seats
African National Congress	16,053	57.28	14	17,452	64.80	6	20
Economic Freedom Fighters	4,924	17.57	0	5,614	20.84	7	7
Democratic Alliance	1,785	6.37	1	2,067	7.67	2	3
Independent candidates	3,783	13.50	1				1
Freedom Front Plus	342	1.22	0	319	1.18	1	1
United Christian Democratic Party	185	0.66	0	208	0.77	0	0
African People's Convention	120	0.43	0	252	0.94	0	0
South African Maintenance and Estate Beneficiaries Association	166	0.59	0	192	0.71	0	0
Mpumalanga Party	128	0.46	0	173	0.64	0	0
Pan Africanist Congress of Azania	119	0.42	0	154	0.57	0	0
Bolsheviks Party of South Africa	114	0.41	0	140	0.52	0	0
Socialist Green Coalition	94	0.34	0	79	0.29	0	0
African Christian Democratic Party	67	0.24	0	98	0.36	0	0
Socialist Agenda of Dispossessed Africans	37	0.13	0	79	0.29	0	0
African People's Socialist Party	39	0.14	0	51	0.19	0	0
Pan African Socialist Movement of Azania	26	0.09	0	55	0.20	0	0
Congress of the People	42	0.15	0				0
Total	28,024	100.00	16	26,933	100.00	16	32
Valid votes	28,024	98.22		26,933	94.60		
Invalid/blank votes	507	1.78		1,538	5.40		
Total votes	28,531	100.00		28,471	100.00		
Registered voters/turnout	56,934	50.11		56,934	50.01		

== November 2021 election ==
The following table shows the results of the 2021 election.

Party	Ward			List			Total seats
Party	Votes	%	Seats	Votes	%	Seats	Total seats
African National Congress	14,546	57.15	13	15,967	64.29	6	19
Economic Freedom Fighters	4,851	19.06	0	5,374	21.64	7	7
Independent candidates	2,947	11.58	2				2
Democratic Alliance	1,237	4.86	1	1,339	5.39	1	2
Bolsheviks Party of South Africa	389	1.53	0	399	1.61	1	1
Freedom Front Plus	382	1.50	0	373	1.50	1	1
Forum for Service Delivery	222	0.87	0	271	1.09	0	0
South African Maintenance and Estate Beneficiaries Association	192	0.75	0	198	0.80	0	0
Socialist Agenda of Dispossessed Africans	156	0.61	0	154	0.62	0	0
Pan Africanist Congress of Azania	120	0.47	0	130	0.52	0	0
Magoshi Swaranang Movement	97	0.38	0	105	0.42	0	0
African Christian Democratic Party	66	0.26	0	89	0.36	0	0
Congress of the People	80	0.31	0	67	0.27	0	0
International Revelation Congress	24	0.09	0	116	0.47	0	0
Mpumalanga Party	52	0.20	0	80	0.32	0	0
Democratic Artists Party	28	0.11	0	44	0.18	0	0
Defenders of the People	26	0.10	0	33	0.13	0	0
African People's Socialist Party	15	0.06	0	38	0.15	0	0
Azanian People's Organisation	5	0.02	0	42	0.17	0	0
United Christian Democratic Party	17	0.07	0	15	0.06	0	0
Total	25,452	100.00	16	24,834	100.00	16	32
Valid votes	25,452	98.46		24,834	96.12		
Invalid/blank votes	399	1.54		1,002	3.88		
Total votes	25,851	100.00		25,836	100.00		
Registered voters/turnout	58,432	44.24		58,432	44.22		

=== By-elections from November 2021 ===
The following by-elections were held to fill vacant ward seats in the period from November 2021.

Date	Ward	Party of the previous councillor	Party of the newly elected councillor
8 Nov 2023	1	African National Congress	African National Congress
17 Sep 2025	9	African National Congress	African National Congress
