= Fetakgomo Local Municipality =

Coordinates: 24°25′S 29°55′E

Fetakgomo
- Local municipality
- Seal

- Location in Limpopo
- Country: South Africa
- Province: Limpopo
- District: Sekhukhune
- Seat: Apel
- Wards: 13

Government
  - Type: Municipal council
  - Mayor: Raesetse Elizabeth Sefala

Area
  - Total: 1,105 km^{2} (427 sq mi)

Population (2011)
  - Total: 93,795
  - Density: 84.88/km^{2} (219.8/sq mi)

Racial makeup (2011)
  - Black African: 99.4%
  - Coloured: 0.0%
  - Indian/Asian: 0.1%
  - White: 0.4%

First languages (2011)
  - Northern Sotho: 94.0%
  - Zulu: 1.2%
  - Other: 4.8%
- Time zone: UTC+2 (SAST)
- Municipal code: LIM474

Fetakgomo Local Municipality was located in the Sekhukhune District Municipality of Limpopo province, South Africa. The seat of Fetakgomo Local Municipality was Apel. The local municipality was one of the four to have passed the 2009-10 audit by the Auditor-General of South Africa, who deemed it to have a clean administration. In 2016 it was merged with Greater Tubatse Local Municipality to form the Fetakgomo Tubatse Local Municipality.

== Main places ==
The 2001 census divided the municipality into the following main places:

Place	Code	Area (km^{2})	Population	Most spoken language
Atok Mine	92101	2.96	395	Northern Sotho
Baroka-Ba-Nkoana	92102	479.49	37,600	Northern Sotho
Mampa	92103	14.19	645	Northern Sotho
Masha Makopele	92104	2.03	1,118	Northern Sotho
Mashabela	92105	71.49	24	Northern Sotho
Matholeng	92106	3.99	1,259	Northern Sotho
Phaahla	92107	5.04	2,463	Northern Sotho
Sekhukhuneland	92108	342.80	32,533	Northern Sotho
Seroka	92109	25.09	2,150	Northern Sotho
Tau-Nchabeleng	92110	169.03	13,902	Northern Sotho

== Politics ==
The municipal council consists of twenty-five members elected by mixed-member proportional representation. Thirteen councillors are elected by first-past-the-post voting in thirteen wards, while the remaining twelve are chosen from party lists so that the total number of party representatives is proportional to the number of votes received. In the election of 18 May 2011, the African National Congress (ANC) won a majority of twenty-one seats on the council. The following table shows the results of the election.

Party	Votes				Seats		
Party	Ward	List	Total	%	Ward	List	Total
ANC	16,835	17,897	34,732	81.2	13	8	21
COPE	1,672	1,705	3,377	7.9	0	2	2
AZAPO	914	891	1,805	4.2	0	1	1
Independent	1,176	–	1,176	2.8	0	–	0
DA	486	482	968	2.3	0	1	1
PAC	281	245	526	1.2	0	0	0
South African Maintenance and Estate Beneficiaries Association	25	121	146	0.3	0	0	0
Black Consciousness Party	11	37	48	0.1	0	0	0
Total	21,400	21,378	42,778	100.0	13	12	25
Spoilt votes	320	321	641				
