= Fetakgomo Tubatse Local Municipality elections =

The Fetakgomo Tubatse Local Municipality is a Local Municipality in Limpopo, South Africa. The council consists of seventy-seven members elected by mixed-member proportional representation. Thirty-nine councillors are elected by first-past-the-post voting in thirty-nine wards, while the remaining thirty-eight are chosen from party lists so that the total number of party representatives is proportional to the number of votes received. In the election of 1 November 2021. The African National Congress (ANC) won a majority of 54 seats on the council.

== Results ==
The following table shows the composition of the council after past elections.

Event	ANC	AZAPO	DA	EFF	PAC	SADA	Other	Total
2016 election	54	1	4	15	1	1	1	77
2021 election	54	1	2	14	1	2	3	77

== August 2016 election ==
The following table shows the results of the 2016 election.

Party	Ward			List			Total seats
Party	Votes	%	Seats	Votes	%	Seats	Total seats
African National Congress	64,761	66.53	39	67,703	69.89	15	54
Economic Freedom Fighters	17,046	17.51	0	18,433	19.03	15	15
Democratic Alliance	4,477	4.60	0	4,479	4.62	4	4
Independent candidates	5,611	5.76	0				0
Azanian People's Organisation	1,077	1.11	0	1,082	1.12	1	1
Congress of the People	937	0.96	0	885	0.91	1	1
Socialist Agenda of Dispossessed Africans	854	0.88	0	905	0.93	1	1
Pan Africanist Congress of Azania	881	0.91	0	767	0.79	1	1
African People's Convention	272	0.28	0	825	0.85	0	0
South African Maintenance and Estate Beneficiaries Association	485	0.50	0	463	0.48	0	0
Sekhukhune Congress	271	0.28	0	396	0.41	0	0
Socialist Radical Change	184	0.19	0	247	0.25	0	0
United Democratic Movement	145	0.15	0	221	0.23	0	0
United Christian Democratic Party	128	0.13	0	174	0.18	0	0
Pan African Socialist Movement of Azania	114	0.12	0	157	0.16	0	0
African People's Socialist Party	61	0.06	0	62	0.06	0	0
Socialist Green Coalition	40	0.04	0	72	0.07	0	0
Total	97,344	100.00	39	96,871	100.00	38	77
Valid votes	97,344	98.22		96,871	97.90		
Invalid/blank votes	1,760	1.78		2,079	2.10		
Total votes	99,104	100.00		98,950	100.00		
Registered voters/turnout	198,678	49.88		198,678	49.80		

== November 2021 election ==
The following table shows the results of the 2021 election.

Party	Ward			List			Total seats
Party	Votes	%	Seats	Votes	%	Seats	Total seats
African National Congress	54,338	66.62	39	56,665	69.75	15	54
Economic Freedom Fighters	13,651	16.74	0	14,161	17.43	14	14
Independent candidates	4,504	5.52	0				0
Socialist Agenda of Dispossessed Africans	1,595	1.96	0	2,072	2.55	2	2
Democratic Alliance	1,604	1.97	0	1,717	2.11	2	2
Azanian People's Organisation	846	1.04	0	806	0.99	1	1
Power of Africans Unity	687	0.84	0	899	1.11	1	1
Freedom Front Plus	611	0.75	0	564	0.69	1	1
Bolsheviks Party of South Africa	607	0.74	0	521	0.64	1	1
Pan Africanist Congress of Azania	489	0.60	0	600	0.74	1	1
South African Maintenance and Estate Beneficiaries Association	431	0.53	0	471	0.58	0	0
African Christian Democratic Party	398	0.49	0	428	0.53	0	0
Defenders of the People	389	0.48	0	396	0.49	0	0
Congress of the People	350	0.43	0	297	0.37	0	0
Patriotic Alliance	224	0.27	0	278	0.34	0	0
Christians of South Africa	185	0.23	0	171	0.21	0	0
African People's Convention	94	0.12	0	158	0.19	0	0
Kingdom Covenant Democratic Party	59	0.07	0	180	0.22	0	0
Inkatha Freedom Party	53	0.06	0	183	0.23	0	0
Forum for Service Delivery	95	0.12	0	134	0.16	0	0
Magoshi Swaranang Movement	99	0.12	0	129	0.16	0	0
Democratic Artists Party	26	0.03	0	103	0.13	0	0
African People's Socialist Party	36	0.04	0	78	0.10	0	0
United Democratic Movement	50	0.06	0	64	0.08	0	0
Africa Restoration Alliance	74	0.09	0	35	0.04	0	0
African Transformation Movement	37	0.05	0	68	0.08	0	0
Movement for African Convention	36	0.04	0	57	0.07	0	0
Total	81,568	100.00	39	81,235	100.00	38	77
Valid votes	81,568	98.41		81,235	97.77		
Invalid/blank votes	1,317	1.59		1,850	2.23		
Total votes	82,885	100.00		83,085	100.00		
Registered voters/turnout	200,184	41.40		200,184	41.50		

=== By-elections from November 2021 ===
The following by-elections were held to fill vacant ward seats in the period since November 2021.

Date	Ward	Party of the previous councillor	Party of the newly elected councillor
3 Sep 2025	34	African National Congress	African National Congress
5 Nov 2025	37	African National Congress	African National Congress
