= Marulaneng =

- Location within Limpopo Location within South Africa
- Coordinates: 24.761°S 29.877°E
- Country: South Africa
- Province: Limpopo
- District: Sekhukhune
- Municipality: Makhuduthamaga
- Time zone: UTC+2 (SAST)
- Postal code (street): 1067
- PO box: 1067

Marulaneng is a village in the Greater Sekhukhune District Municipality in the Limpopo Province, South Africa. Marulaneng falls within the administrative boundaries of the Makhuduthamaga Local Municipality.

Jane Furse is the nearest major economic centre for Marulaneng along with several villages such as Ga-Molepane, Ga-Moretsele, Madibong, Mamone, Marulaneng, Mokwete and Riverside, Glen Cowie.

== Government ==
Marulaneng is under the authority of traditional leader, known as Kgoši Seraki Thulare whose father and former chief is Kgoši Phetedi Thulare.

== Culture ==
The media serving the area are Sekhukhune Community Radio, Thobela FM, the Polokwane-based South African Broadcasting Corporation (SABC) radio station and Capricorn FM, a commercial radio station also based in Polokwane.

Sepedi is the mainly spoken in Marulaneng. Other languages also spoken here, although by a minority of residents, include Tsonga and Swati.

=== Education ===
Only two schools are positioned in Marulaneng.

- Thulare Primary School
- Mpilo Secondary School
