= Winnie Mashaba =

South African singer-songwriter

Selinah Winnie Mashaba
- Born: April 1, 1981 (age 45); Steelpoort, Limpopo, South Africa
- Genres: Gospel
- Occupations: Singer; songwriter
- Instrument: Vocals
- Years active: 2000–present
- Label: Tswako Music Projects
- Website: www.winniemashaba.com

Winnie Mashaba (born April 1,1981) is a South African gospel singer, TV presenter, and businesswoman. Born and raised in the village of Kgoši Phasha, Steelpoort, she released her first album, Exodus 20, in 2000.

== Early life ==
Mashaba attended Mashupje High School but dropped out soon after completing grade eleven in 1998 to pursue a career in gospel music. Her first break came after she auditioned for Solly Moholo. In 2000, soon after the audition, she released her debut album, Exodus 20. She has been nominated for numerous awards, including a Kora for Best African Spiritual Female in 2005. Other awards include the South African Music Awards (SAMA), South African Gospel Awards and Metro FM Music Awards. In 2010 she was named Best Female Artist at the Crown Gospel Awards.

In 2015, Mashaba was named the host of Amahubo, a gospel music television show aired on Dumisa. In November 2019, she received an Honorary Doctorate from Trinity International Bible University (TIBU) for her work in music.

In November 2022, Mashaba married Tebatso Phetla, a resident of Bothashoek Village in the neighboring town of Burgersfort.

== Controversies ==
In October 2024, Mashaba received criticism from fans after she used a private aircraft to visit Solly Moholo's family following his death, while they had been collecting donations to cover his hospital bill.

== Discography ==
Year	Title	Type / Format
2000	Exodus 20	Studio album
2001	Lefu Le Tshabeng Ellish Park Stadium	Studio album
2003	Motswelle Se Bapale Ka Kereke Ena	Studio album
2005	O Tla Ya Kae?	Studio album
2006	Thola ngwanesu	Studio album
2007	Kea Letshaba Lefase	Studio album
2008	Ke Rata Wena	Studio album
2009	Joang Kapa Joang	Studio album
2010	Go Tseba Jehova	Studio album
2011	Modimo O Nale Nna	Studio album
2012	Bophelo Ke Leeto	Studio album
2014	Very Best Of (Live)	Live / Compilation album
2015	Lehlotlo Laka	Studio album
2016	1st Hymns Project Live Recorded	Live album
2017	Dilo Tša Lefase	Studio album
2018	The Journey With Winnie Mashaba Live at Emperors Palace	Live album
2021	Moporofeta Jeremiah	Studio album
2022	Relebogile	Studio album
2023	Difela Vol 2	Studio album
2025	Difela Vol 3	Studio album

== Awards and nominations ==
Year	Nominated work	Award / Organization	Category	Result
2005	Herself	Kora All Africa Music Awards	Best African Spiritual Female	Nominated
2006	Herself	TUT FM Music Awards	Best Gospel Artist of the Year	Won
2008	"Hakena Nako"	One Gospel Music Awards	Best Song of the Year	Won
2009	Herself	Sekhukhune Achievers Awards	Community Contribution Award	Won
2010	Herself	Crown Gospel Music Awards	Best Female Artist	Won
2010	Herself	Sekhukhune District Municipality	Mayor's Excellence Award	Won
2010	Herself	Metro FM Awards	Best Urban Gospel	Nominated
2013	Bophelo Ke Leeto	Crown Gospel Music Awards	Best Female Artist	Won
2013	Bophelo Ke Leeto	19th MTN South African Music Awards (SAMA)	Best Gospel Album	Nominated
2019	Herself	Limpopo Music Awards (LIMA)	Best Traditional Gospel Artist	Won
