= Tiekiedraai =

- Location within Limpopo Location within South Africa
- Coordinates: 24.448°S 29.739°E
- Country: South Africa
- Province: Limpopo
- District: Sekhukhune
- Municipality: Fetakgomo Tubatse

Area
  - Total: 1.40 km^{2} (0.54 sq mi)

Population (2011)
  - Total: 455
  - Density: 325/km^{2} (842/sq mi)

Racial makeup (2011)
  - Black African: 100.0%

First languages (2011)
  - Northern Sotho: 96.5%
  - Zulu: 2.2%
  - Other: 1.3%
- Time zone: UTC+2 (SAST)

Tiekiedraai is a village in Sekhukhune District Municipality in the Limpopo province of South Africa.
