= Apiesdoring =

- Location within Limpopo Location within South Africa
- Coordinates: 24.655°S 30.344°E
- Country: South Africa
- Province: Limpopo
- District: Sekhukhune
- Municipality: Fetakgomo Tubatse

Area
  - Total: 7.40 km^{2} (2.86 sq mi)

Population (2011)
  - Total: 1,515
  - Density: 205/km^{2} (530/sq mi)

Racial makeup (2011)
  - Black African: 86.5%
  - Coloured: 1.2%
  - Indian/Asian: 0.2%
  - White: 11.9%
  - Other: 0.2%

First languages (2011)
  - Northern Sotho: 71.5%
  - Afrikaans: 12.5%
  - Tsonga: 2.7%
  - English: 2.6%
  - Other: 10.7%
- Time zone: UTC+2 (SAST)

Apiesdoring is a town in Sekhukhune District Municipality in the Limpopo province of South Africa.
