= Penge, Limpopo =

Mabulane Penge
- Location within Limpopo Location within South Africa
- Coordinates: 24.383°S 30.317°E
- Country: South Africa
- Province: Limpopo
- District: Greater Sekhukhune
- Municipality: Fetakgomo Tubatse

Area
  - Total: 28.54 km^{2} (11.02 sq mi)

Population (2011)
  - Total: 2,819
  - Density: 98.77/km^{2} (255.8/sq mi)

Racial makeup (2011)
  - Black African: 99.4%
  - Coloured: 0.2%
  - Indian/Asian: 0.1%
  - White: 0.3%
  - Other: 0.1%

First languages (2011)
  - Northern Sotho: 94.8%
  - Zulu: 1.3%
  - English: 1.1%
  - Other: 2.9%
- Time zone: UTC+2 (SAST)
- Postal code (street): 1160

Penge, alternatively known as Mabulane, is a township in Sekhukhune District Municipality in the Limpopo province of South Africa.

Mining village on the Lepelle River, 37 km north of Burgersfort. It was established after amosite was discovered there in 1907. Named after Kgosi Mabulane of Roka Motshana tribal authority or alternatively Penge, a suburb of London.
