= Peter Nchabeleng =

South African activist (1928–1986)

Peter Nchabeleng OLG
- Born: Peter Mampogoane Nchabeleng; 7 March 1928; Apel, Northern Transvaal; Union of South Africa
- Died: 11 April 1986 (aged 58); Schoonoord, Lebowa
- Cause of death: Beaten by police
- Political party: African National Congress
- Other political affiliations: South African Communist Party; United Democratic Front
- Spouse: Gertrude Nchabeleng
- Children: Elleck Nchabeleng

Peter Mampogoane Nchabeleng (7 March 1928 – 11 April 1986) was a South African trade unionist and anti-apartheid activist who died in police detention in the Lebowa bantustan in April 1986. At the time of his death, he was the inaugural chairperson of the United Democratic Front in the Northern Transvaal and head of the underground African National Congress (ANC) in the same region.

Nchabeleng rose to political prominence in the 1950s in Pretoria, where he was active in the ANC, the South African Communist Party, the South African Congress of Trade Unions, and the Sebatakgomo movement of his native Sekhukhuneland. He was imprisoned on Robben Island for eight years from 1964 to 1972 on charges related to his activism as an early recruit to Umkhonto we Sizwe. In the decade after his release, he was banished to his birthplace at Apel, Northern Transvaal, where he remained active in ANC networks and where he continued to face police attention. He died on 11 April 1986 after being severely beaten by police officers who had arrested him earlier the same day. His death attracted national attention and he remains an iconic figure in the ANC.

== Early life and education ==
Nchabeleng was born on 7 March 1928 in Apel, a village in rural Sekhukhuneland in the former Northern Transvaal. He was the sixth child of Zebulon and Salome Nchabeleng and was Pedi. As a child, he was a herd boy and completed primary school nearby; he later attended high school in Pretoria.

== Anti-apartheid activism ==
=== Pretoria: 1950s–1960s ===
While in Pretoria, in the early 1950s, Nchabeleng worked at the Government Printers and was secretary of the local branch of the African National Congress (ANC) in Atteridgeville. He was also a member of the South African Communist Party, then an illegal organisation, and was active in the trade union movement, becoming regional secretary for the Allied Workers' Union, and later for the South African Congress of Trade Unions, in the Pretoria region. At the same time, Nchabeleng was a leading figure in Sebatakgomo, a resistance movement of Sekhukhune migrant workers, primarily in Johannesburg, who protested the implementation of the Bantu Authorities Act and helped kindle the 1958 Sekhukhuneland revolt. He was also a key figure in efforts to aid those who were arrested in the revolt, acting as an interpreter for the detainees' lawyer, communist Joe Slovo.

The apartheid government banned the ANC in 1960 and, in the immediate aftermath, Nchabeleng was appointed to the seven-member committee established to continue anti-apartheid organising in Pretoria. When Umkhonto we Sizwe (MK) was established in December 1961, he became one of seven MK section commanders operating underground in Pretoria. On 16 May 1963, Nchabeleng was arrested to stand trial under the Suppression of Communism Act for membership in the illegal ANC and possession of banned material. He and his co-accused were sentenced to three years' imprisonment, with two-and-a-half years of the sentence suspended. However, on 17 August 1964, he was arrested again with several others and prosecuted on further charges related to his MK activities, including recruiting cadres and manufacturing explosives. Convicted on those charges, Nchabeleng served eight years' imprisonment on Robben Island.

=== Apel: 1970s–1980s ===
Upon his release from Robben Island in 1972, Nchabeleng and his family were banished to Apel, his homeland, where he had not lived for some 25 years. The Nchabeleng home in Abel became a key hub for ANC-affiliated political activists as Nchabeleng, his sons, and some friends "kept alive something of an ANC tradition"; for example, Nchabeleng kept a collection of political documents, including an illegal copy of the Freedom Charter, buried under the goats' kraal behind his house.

Within years, in 1974, he faced another criminal conviction, this time for contravening the post-incarceration banning order against him – the state's evidence was based on intercepted communications between Nchabeleng and trade unionist Stephen Dlamini. His three-year prison sentence was suspended for all three years and he remained in Apel. However, more serious charges followed, this time after MK operative Tokyo Sexwale wounded two police constables with a hand grenade. In subsequent weeks, the entirety of the Northern Transvaal ANC underground network, Nchabeleng included, were rounded up by police and prosecuted. Although most of the defendants – including one of Nchabeleng's sons, Elleck – received prison sentences, Nchabeleng was acquitted and released with Nelson Diale and (a close friend) Joe Gqabi. His banning order was renewed until 1983.

In 1983, after the United Democratic Front (UDF) was founded, Nchabeleng became an early member and was appointed to the coordinating committee established to prepare for the launch of the front's Northern Transvaal branch. When the regional branch was launched in 1985, Nchabeleng was elected as its inaugural chairperson, with Louis Mnguni as his deputy and Joyce Mabudafhasi as secretary. At the same time, Nchabeleng remained active in the ANC underground; he was the overall head of the underground throughout the Northern Transvaal. As Ineke van Kessel later observed, the Northern Transvaal was one of the few regions in which the ANC's political and military activities were well integrated and well coordinated.

Indeed, Nchabeleng even retained influence with youth activists in the region, who were increasingly militant in the aftermath of the Vaal uprising. The Nchabeleng house in Apel was a focal point for the meetings that led to the formation of the Sekhukhune Youth Organisation (SEYO). Nchabeleng's last detention and death, in April 1986, coincided with a particularly tumultuous period in local youth politics; the Nchabelengs were harbouring a young MK activist who had escaped from police custody, and further state response was provoked by a series of vigilante attacks, primarily by necklacing, on suspected witches. Nchabeleng spoke publicly against the witch-hunts.

== Death ==
In the early morning of 11 April 1986, Nchabeleng was detained at his house, as part of the opening salvo of a broader crackdown against political activists in the area. His wife later testified that the squad of police officers that arrested him – some ten officers of the Lebowa Police – told him that, "last time, it was Robben Island, this time we are going to kill you". The next day, the police returned to the house to report that Nchabeleng had died in detention of a heart attack.

After some delay by the state, the family found Nchabeleng's body at a mortuary at Groblersdal. An inquest found that he had died within 12 hours of his arrival at the police station in Schoonoord; he had been severely beaten by police officers, causing subcutaneous bleeding that had caused him to lose consciousness and then to suffocate.

He was succeeded as UDF regional chairperson by his deputy, Louis Mnguni. His funeral was widely attended and the UDF called a consumer boycott to protest his torture and death. Two decades later, in December 2009, post-apartheid president Jacob Zuma awarded Nchabeleng the Order of Luthuli in gold "for his exceptional contribution to the fight against the apartheid system in South Africa".

== Personal life ==
He was married to Gertrude Nchabeleng, with whom he had several children.

== See also ==
- Separate development
- Deaths in police custody
- History of the African National Congress
