= Saaiplaas =

- Location within Limpopo Location within South Africa
- Coordinates: 25.162°S 29.760°E
- Country: South Africa
- Province: Limpopo
- District: Sekhukhune
- Municipality: Elias Motsoaledi

Area
  - Total: 7.45 km^{2} (2.88 sq mi)

Population (2011)
  - Total: 2,332
  - Density: 313/km^{2} (811/sq mi)

Racial makeup (2011)
  - Black African: 100.0%

First languages (2011)
  - S. Ndebele: 63.6%
  - Northern Sotho: 28.3%
  - Sotho: 3.1%
  - Zulu: 2.4%
  - Other: 2.5%
- Time zone: UTC+2 (SAST)
- Postal code (street): 1047

Saaiplaas is a town in Elias Motsoaledi Local Municipality in the Limpopo province of South Africa.
