= Syferfontein-B =

- Location within Limpopo Location within South Africa
- Coordinates: 25.024°S 29.783°E
- Country: South Africa
- Province: Limpopo
- District: Sekhukhune
- Municipality: Elias Motsoaledi

Area
  - Total: 3.54 km^{2} (1.37 sq mi)

Population (2001)
  - Total: 3,917
  - Density: 1,110/km^{2} (2,870/sq mi)
- Time zone: UTC+2 (SAST)

Syferfontein-B is a town in Sekhukhune District Municipality in the Limpopo province of South Africa.
