= Kutupu =

Village in Limpopo Province, South Africa

- Village
- Location in Limpopo Kutupu (South Africa)
- Coordinates: 24.945°S 29.7129°E
- Country: South Africa
- Province: Limpopo
- District: Sekhukhune
- Municipality: Makhuduthamaga

Population (2011)
  - Total: 3,917
- Time zone: UTC+2 (SAST)

Kutupu is a village in Makhuduthamaga municipality, Sekhukhune district in the South African province of Limpopo. Its population as of 2011 was 3,917. Kutupu is named after the river of the same name that runs through it.

The village has two primary schools, Kopjeng and Mokgoshi, and two secondary schools, Makhato and Maserumule.

Languages spoken in Kutupu include Northern Sotho, isiSwati, and isiNdebele.
