= Ditholong =

Ditholong Letebejane
- Location within Limpopo Location within South Africa
- Coordinates: 24.5028°S 30.6069°E
- Country: South Africa
- Province: Limpopo
- District: Sekhukhune
- Municipality: Ephraim Mogale

Area
  - Total: 1.35 km^{2} (0.52 sq mi)

Population (2011)
  - Total: 1,655
  - Density: 1,230/km^{2} (3,180/sq mi)

Racial makeup (2011)
  - Black African: 99.9%
  - White: 0.1%

First languages (2011)
  - Northern Sesotho: 95.8%
  - IsiZulu: 2.0%
  - Other: 2.2%
- Time zone: UTC+2 (SAST)

Ditholong is a village established in the late 1970s as an extension of Letebejane Village. The name means Place of the African Antelope.

This village lies along the Flag Boshielo Dam (formerly known as Arabie Dam). The village is under the chieftaincy of Chief Rakgoadi Matlala, who is the local chief based at Ga-Matlala'a Rakgoadi in Mohlalaotoane.

== Economy ==
Economic movement is very slow in this small village and residents normally move to the more economically vibrant cities (Predominantly in Gauteng) to seek greener pastures. Seroka Consulting, which is founded and owned by a local engineer who is also a community development stalwart, in a joint venture with Gudani has conducted a feasibility study on tourism development in Schuinsdraai Nature Reserve and the adjacent villages in the eastern side of the dam for Sekhukhune Development Agency in 2011/12 financial year. Schuinsdraai Nature Reserve is located in the western side of Flag Boshielo Dam which forms a boundary with villages in the eastern side, viz. Letebejane/ Ditholong villages in the north and Makgatle (Ga Makharankhane) village in the south. The main goal of the feasibility study was to give Sekhukhune Development Agency and its development partners (Ephraim Mogale Local Municipality, Limpopo Tourism Board and communities adjacent to the dam site) sufficient confidence to make informed decisions about potential for private investment in the project. Using primary and secondary data, the study team looked at (1) whether the institutional and regulatory environment was supportive; (2) whether the proposed project site was suitable for development of the proposed tourism attraction facilities (considering access to civil engineering services and environmental sensitivities); (3) whether there is a sustainable market for the proposed tourist attraction facilities; and (4) whether the proposed development is financial viable with potential to attract private investors.

The assessment of the strategies, policies and plans of regulating authorities indicated a positive outlook on tourism in the Schuinsdraai/ Flag Boshielo Precinct. Ecotourism is a growing segment with an increasing attraction of international, national and local visitors.

== Water ==
The villagers have always struggled with water resources until the Arabie water project was established a few years ago. All residents now have access to clean tap water in their yards.

== Education ==
The local school is Kotole High school, and despite a lack of resources it has produced a few professionals, including engineers and software developers. Most of these young professionals are based in Pretoria and they keep a very close bond, as evidenced by their frequent get-together in the city or in the village for special occasions.

== Crime ==
Crime is a major problem for local businesses. This includes shops and local spaza shops. This has seen a few businesses close down as a result of being broken into and ransacked, or having robberies take place at gun point. This has only made the migration to the big cities to increase.
