= Strydkraal =

- Location within Limpopo Location within South Africa
- Coordinates: 24.469°S 29.713°E
- Country: South Africa
- Province: Limpopo
- District: Sekhukhune
- Municipality: Fetakgomo Tubatse

Area
  - Total: 3.65 km^{2} (1.41 sq mi)

Population (2011)
  - Total: 2,724
  - Density: 746/km^{2} (1,930/sq mi)

Racial makeup (2011)
  - Black African: 99.9%

First languages (2011)
  - Northern Sotho: 95.4%
  - Zulu: 1.1%
  - Other: 3.5%
- Time zone: UTC+2 (SAST)

Strydkraal is a town in Fetakgomo Tubatse Local Municipality in the Limpopo province of South Africa.
