= Glen Cowie =

- Location within Limpopo Location within South Africa
- Coordinates: 24.840°S 29.804°E
- Country: South Africa
- Province: Limpopo
- District: Sekhukhune
- Municipality: Makhuduthamaga

Area
  - Total: 4.19 km^{2} (1.62 sq mi)

Population (2011)
  - Total: 7,966
  - Density: 1,900/km^{2} (4,920/sq mi)

Racial makeup (2011)
  - Black African: 99.6%
  - Coloured: 0.1%
  - White: 0.1%
  - Other: 0.2%

First languages (2011)
  - Northern Sotho: 92.0%
  - Zulu: 1.8%
  - Swazi: 1.8%
  - Other: 4.4%
- Time zone: UTC+2 (SAST)
- PO box: 1061
- Area code: 013

Glen Cowie is a Roman Catholic Mission located in Ga-Moloi under Kwena Madihlaba Sekhukhune District Municipality in the Limpopo province of South Africa. It is bordered to the west by Phokwane, to the east by Jane Furse; to the south by Ga-Malaka.

== Cultural Aspects ==
The population of Glen Cowie predominantly speaks Northern Sotho, reflecting the region's cultural heritage. Traditional practices and community events are integral to the locality's social fabric. Although the village falls under the Makhuduthamaga Municipality, there is a recognised local chief, (Kgoši) Mr S Madihlaba.

== Education ==
Glen Cowie hosts several educational institutions that serve the community in and around the Glen Cowie area:

- Sebjaneng Primary School - a primary school (Grade 1 to 7) located in Mathousand, Glen Cowie.
- Mapalagadi Primary Project School - a primary technical primary school (Grade 1 to 7) established in 1993.
- Hlabje Primary School - a primary school (Grade 1 to 7) located in Morgenzon, New Stands, Glen Cowie.
- Mapalagadi Primary Project School - a primary technical primary school (Grade 1 to 7) established in 1993.
- Glen Cowie Secondary School - a public secondary school offering education from grades 8 to 12, situated at the Glen Cowie Catholic Mission.
- Mabodibeng Secondary School - a public secondary school located in the Ga Moloi area of Glen Cowie, serving the local community.
- Ponti Secondary School - situated in the heart of Glen Cowie.
- Mabodibeng Secondary School
- Legaletlwa Secondary School
- Matshumane Secondary School
- Mpelegend Primary School
- Mphele A Mphele Secondary School
- Phiriagare Secondary School
- Photo Primary School
- Tlame Primary School

== Economic Activities ==
The economy of Glen Cowie is primarily based on local agriculture and small-scale trading. The community engages in farming activities, contributing to the local economy and sustenance of the residents.

== Health facilities ==
- St. Rita's Hospital
- St Rita's Clinic

Besides the public hospitals mentioned above, the village is also served by a variety of private health practitioners.

== Transportation and Accessibility ==
Glen Cowie is accessible via regional roads (the R579) connecting it to neighbouring towns such as Jane Furse and Phokwane. The locality's infrastructure supports basic transportation needs, facilitating movement for residents and visitors.
