= Sterkfontein, Limpopo =

Sterkfontein
- Location within Limpopo Location within South Africa
- Coordinates: 25.049°S 29.607°E
- Country: South Africa
- Province: Limpopo
- District: Sekhukhune
- Municipality: Elias Motsoaledi

Area
  - Total: 1.63 km^{2} (0.63 sq mi)

Population (2011)
  - Total: 1,277
  - Density: 783/km^{2} (2,030/sq mi)

Racial makeup (2011)
  - Black African: 99.8%
  - Other: 0.2%

First languages (2011)
  - Northern Sotho: 88.6%
  - Zulu: 5.5%
  - Swazi: 3.0%
  - S. Ndebele: 1.5%
  - Other: 1.5%
- Time zone: UTC+2 (SAST)
- Postal code (street): 1911

Sterkfontein is a town in Elias Motsoaledi Local Municipality in the Limpopo province of South Africa.
