= Elandskraal =

- Location within Limpopo Location within South Africa
- Coordinates: 24.720°S 29.407°E
- Country: South Africa
- Province: Limpopo
- District: Sekhukhune
- Municipality: Ephraim Mogale

Area
  - Total: 2.39 km^{2} (0.92 sq mi)

Population (2011)
  - Total: 6,361
  - Density: 2,660/km^{2} (6,890/sq mi)

Racial makeup (2011)
  - Black African: 99.4%
  - Coloured: 0.3%
  - Indian/Asian: 0.3%

First languages (2011)
  - Northern Sotho: 80.6%
  - Tsonga: 5.4%
  - Zulu: 4.9%
  - S. Ndebele: 3.1%
  - Other: 6.1%
- Time zone: UTC+2 (SAST)
- Postal code (street): n/a
- PO box: n/a

Elandskraal is a town in Sekhukhune District Municipality in the Limpopo province of South Africa.
