= Dr JS Moroka Local Municipality elections =

The Dr JS Moroka Local Municipality council consists of sixty-two members elected by mixed-member proportional representation. Thirty-one councillors are elected by first-past-the-post voting in thirty-one wards, while the remaining thirty-one are chosen from party lists so that the total number of party representatives is proportional to the number of votes received. In the election of 1 November 2021 the African National Congress (ANC) won a majority of thirty-nine seats.

== Results ==
The following table shows the composition of the council after past elections.

Event	AIC	ANC	APC	DA	EFF	FSD	SPP	PAC	Other	Total
2000 election	—	53	—	4	—	—	—	3	0	60
2006 election	—	52	—	3	—	—	1	3	1	60
2011 election	—	52	1	4	—	—	1	1	3	62
2016 election	1	43	1	4	10	1	0	1	1	62
2021 election	1	39	1	3	10	2	0	—	6	62

== December 2000 election ==
The following table shows the results of the 2000 election.

Party	Ward			List			Total seats
Party	Votes	%	Seats	Votes	%	Seats	Total seats
African National Congress	32,301	86.99	30	32,553	87.29	23	53
Democratic Alliance	2,109	5.68	0	2,534	6.80	4	4
Pan Africanist Congress of Azania	2,036	5.48	0	2,204	5.91	3	3
Independent candidates	684	1.84	0				0
Total	37,130	100.00	30	37,291	100.00	30	60
Valid votes	37,130	96.52		37,291	96.50		
Invalid/blank votes	1,339	3.48		1,351	3.50		
Total votes	38,469	100.00		38,642	100.00		
Registered voters/turnout	102,497	37.53		102,497	37.70		

== March 2006 election ==
The following table shows the results of the 2006 election.

Party	Ward			List			Total seats
Party	Votes	%	Seats	Votes	%	Seats	Total seats
African National Congress	38,286	79.64	29	40,389	87.39	23	52
Independent candidates	5,231	10.88	1				1
Pan Africanist Congress of Azania	1,824	3.79	0	2,176	4.71	3	3
Democratic Alliance	2,079	4.32	0	1,908	4.13	3	3
Sindawonye Progressive Party	346	0.72	0	834	1.80	1	1
United Democratic Movement	74	0.15	0	540	1.17	0	0
Azanian People's Organisation	234	0.49	0	372	0.80	0	0
Total	48,074	100.00	30	46,219	100.00	30	60
Valid votes	48,074	97.05		46,219	93.58		
Invalid/blank votes	1,460	2.95		3,169	6.42		
Total votes	49,534	100.00		49,388	100.00		
Registered voters/turnout	111,877	44.28		111,877	44.14		

== May 2011 election ==
The following table shows the results of the 2011 election.

Party	Ward			List			Total seats
Party	Votes	%	Seats	Votes	%	Seats	Total seats
African National Congress	47,725	78.02	31	50,159	82.59	21	52
Democratic Alliance	4,247	6.94	0	4,307	7.09	4	4
Independent candidates	4,335	7.09	0				0
National Freedom Party	1,211	1.98	0	1,076	1.77	1	1
Ikusasa Lesizwe Independent Movement	443	0.72	0	1,319	2.17	1	1
Pan Africanist Congress of Azania	889	1.45	0	762	1.25	1	1
Congress of the People	639	1.04	0	909	1.50	1	1
Sindawonye Progressive Party	583	0.95	0	810	1.33	1	1
African People's Convention	428	0.70	0	869	1.43	1	1
African Christian Democratic Party	423	0.69	0	403	0.66	0	0
Movement Democratic Party	245	0.40	0	116	0.19	0	0
Total	61,168	100.00	31	60,730	100.00	31	62
Valid votes	61,168	98.08		60,730	96.95		
Invalid/blank votes	1,195	1.92		1,911	3.05		
Total votes	62,363	100.00		62,641	100.00		
Registered voters/turnout	118,114	52.80		118,114	53.03		

== August 2016 election ==
The following table shows the results of the 2016 election.

Party	Ward			List			Total seats
Party	Votes	%	Seats	Votes	%	Seats	Total seats
African National Congress	46,379	66.53	30	46,985	69.11	13	43
Economic Freedom Fighters	11,057	15.86	0	10,784	15.86	10	10
Democratic Alliance	4,257	6.11	0	4,432	6.52	4	4
Independent candidates	4,387	6.29	1				1
African Independent Congress	275	0.39	0	1,438	2.12	1	1
Pan Africanist Congress of Azania	675	0.97	0	684	1.01	1	1
Forum for Service Delivery	508	0.73	0	531	0.78	1	1
African People's Convention	366	0.52	0	594	0.87	1	1
Congress of the People	462	0.66	0	412	0.61	0	0
Sindawonye Progressive Party	369	0.53	0	451	0.66	0	0
African Christian Democratic Party	298	0.43	0	366	0.54	0	0
Bolsheviks Party of South Africa	92	0.13	0	301	0.44	0	0
Abahlali Bemzansi Organisation	158	0.23	0	222	0.33	0	0
United Democratic Movement	97	0.14	0	215	0.32	0	0
Agang South Africa	73	0.10	0	167	0.25	0	0
Pan African Socialist Movement of Azania	119	0.17	0	70	0.10	0	0
Inkatha Freedom Party	6	0.01	0	104	0.15	0	0
African People's Socialist Party	47	0.07	0	54	0.08	0	0
Asisikimeni Community Development and Advice Movement	31	0.04	0	64	0.09	0	0
Mpumalanga Party	24	0.03	0	54	0.08	0	0
Ingubo Yeskhethu Party				55	0.08	0	0
African Liberation Party	35	0.05	0				0
Total	69,715	100.00	31	67,983	100.00	31	62
Valid votes	69,715	97.89		67,983	97.25		
Invalid/blank votes	1,505	2.11		1,922	2.75		
Total votes	71,220	100.00		69,905	100.00		
Registered voters/turnout	130,145	54.72		130,145	53.71		

== November 2021 election ==
The following table shows the results of the 2021 election.

Party	Ward			List			Total seats
Party	Votes	%	Seats	Votes	%	Seats	Total seats
African National Congress	30,312	58.26	30	31,616	61.11	9	39
Economic Freedom Fighters	7,752	14.90	0	8,809	17.03	10	10
Independent candidates	6,137	11.79	1				1
Democratic Alliance	2,392	4.60	0	2,815	5.44	3	3
African Independent People's Organisation	1,114	2.14	0	1,825	3.53	2	2
Forum for Service Delivery	667	1.28	0	2,262	4.37	2	2
Moretele Independent Civic Organization	637	1.22	0	774	1.50	1	1
African Independent Congress	387	0.74	0	724	1.40	1	1
Moretele Peoples Party	465	0.89	0	582	1.12	1	1
African People's Convention	508	0.98	0	421	0.81	1	1
African Voice Progressive Party	468	0.90	0	436	0.84	1	1
International Revelation Congress	364	0.70	0	380	0.73	0	0
Sindawonye Progressive Party	222	0.43	0	302	0.58	0	0
Freedom Front Plus	181	0.35	0	158	0.31	0	0
African Transformation Movement	97	0.19	0	232	0.45	0	0
United Democratic Movement	148	0.28	0	181	0.35	0	0
Patriotic Alliance	93	0.18	0	100	0.19	0	0
United Residents Front	85	0.16	0	65	0.13	0	0
Bolsheviks Party of South Africa	3	0.01	0	55	0.11	0	0
Total	52,032	100.00	31	51,737	100.00	31	62
Valid votes	52,032	98.37		51,737	97.96		
Invalid/blank votes	864	1.63		1,080	2.04		
Total votes	52,896	100.00		52,817	100.00		
Registered voters/turnout	123,373	42.87		123,373	42.81		

=== By-elections from November 2021 ===
The following by-elections were held to fill vacant ward seats in the period from the election in November 2021.

Date	Ward	Party of the previous councillor	Party of the newly elected councillor
31 May 2022	10	African National Congress	African National Congress
