= Praktiseer =

Praktiseer Kasi or Tubatse township
- Location within Limpopo Location within South Africa
- Coordinates: 24.581°S 30.318°E
- Country: South Africa
- Province: Limpopo
- District: Sekhukhune
- Municipality: Fetakgomo Tubatse

Area
  - Total: 12.36 km^{2} (4.77 sq mi)

Population (2011)
  - Total: 22,264
  - Density: 1,801/km^{2} (4,665/sq mi)

Racial makeup (2011)
  - Black African: 99.4%
  - Coloured: 0.2%
  - Indian/Asian: 0.2%
  - White: 0.1%
  - Other: 0.1%

First languages (2011)
  - Northern Sotho: 88.6%
  - Zulu: 2.3%
  - Swazi: 2.2%
  - Tsonga: 1.7%
  - Other: 5.2%
- Time zone: UTC+2 (SAST)
- Postal code (street): 1150
- Area code: 013

Praktiseer is a township in Sekhukhune District Municipality in the Limpopo province of South Africa.

It is made up of 5 sub-sections namely: Shushumela (written as Šušumela) extension 1, extension 2, Dark City, and Kasi, sikiring and lately Tswelopele park.

Praktiseer has a public health clinic situated in Kasi,4 primary schools namely Bogwasha, Itirele, Koboti and Batubatse, two public high schools (Kweledi Secondary School and Leolo High School) and a private high school, Ntlhahlole. It is also a home to a TVET college Sekhukhune FET college formerly known as Dr. C.N Phatudi college of education. Neighbouring three villages namely; Alverton, Ga Motodi and Bothashoek. Praktiseer is one of the fastest developing townships in the Sekhukhune District Municipality.
