= Thembisile Hani Local Municipality elections =

The Thembisile Hani Local Municipality is a Local Municipality in Mpumalanga, South Africa. The council consists of sixty-four members elected by mixed-member proportional representation. Thirty-two councillors are elected by first-past-the-post voting in thirty-two wards, while the remaining thirty-two are chosen from party lists so that the total number of party representatives is proportional to the number of votes received. In the election of 1 November 2021 the African National Congress (ANC) won a majority of forty seats.

== Results ==
The following table shows the composition of the council after past elections.

Event	ACDP	ANC	DA	EFF	IND	PAC	SPP	Other	Total
2000 election	—	54	2	—	1	2	—	1	60
2006 election	1	50	4	—	2	1	1	1	60
2011 election	1	51	4	—	1	1	4	2	64
2016 election	0	49	3	9	0	0	1	2	64
2021 election	—	40	4	12	2	—	1	5	64

== December 2000 election ==
The following table shows the results of the 2000 election.

Party	Ward			List			Total seats
Party	Votes	%	Seats	Votes	%	Seats	Total seats
African National Congress	33,206	83.19	29	35,509	90.54	25	54
Independent candidates	4,260	10.67	1				1
Democratic Alliance	1,400	3.51	0	1,504	3.83	2	2
Pan Africanist Congress of Azania	830	2.08	0	1,482	3.78	2	2
Inkatha Freedom Party	180	0.45	0	723	1.84	1	1
United Democratic Movement	40	0.10	0				0
Total	39,916	100.00	30	39,218	100.00	30	60
Valid votes	39,916	96.56		39,218	95.82		
Invalid/blank votes	1,424	3.44		1,711	4.18		
Total votes	41,340	100.00		40,929	100.00		
Registered voters/turnout	102,238	40.44		102,238	40.03		

== March 2006 election ==
The following table shows the results of the 2006 election.

Party	Ward			List			Total seats
Party	Votes	%	Seats	Votes	%	Seats	Total seats
African National Congress	37,899	77.74	28	41,144	84.67	22	50
Democratic Alliance	3,197	6.56	0	3,009	6.19	4	4
Independent candidates	4,790	9.83	2				2
Sindawonye Progressive Party	952	1.95	0	1,296	2.67	1	1
Pan Africanist Congress of Azania	764	1.57	0	1,033	2.13	1	1
African Christian Democratic Party	582	1.19	0	691	1.42	1	1
United Democratic Movement	199	0.41	0	712	1.47	1	1
Inkatha Freedom Party	267	0.55	0	387	0.80	0	0
Azanian People's Organisation	99	0.20	0	320	0.66	0	0
Total	48,749	100.00	30	48,592	100.00	30	60
Valid votes	48,749	97.44		48,592	96.42		
Invalid/blank votes	1,281	2.56		1,802	3.58		
Total votes	50,030	100.00		50,394	100.00		
Registered voters/turnout	117,520	42.57		117,520	42.88		

== May 2011 election ==
The following table shows the results of the 2011 election.

Party	Ward			List			Total seats
Party	Votes	%	Seats	Votes	%	Seats	Total seats
African National Congress	57,937	77.34	31	60,173	80.18	20	51
Sindawonye Progressive Party	4,547	6.07	0	4,902	6.53	4	4
Democratic Alliance	4,829	6.45	0	4,582	6.11	4	4
Independent candidates	3,770	5.03	1				1
African People's Convention	1,559	2.08	0	1,452	1.93	1	1
Ikusasa Lesizwe Independent Movement	795	1.06	0	1,924	2.56	1	1
Pan Africanist Congress of Azania	448	0.60	0	434	0.58	1	1
African Christian Democratic Party	434	0.58	0	410	0.55	1	1
Congress of the People	277	0.37	0	542	0.72	0	0
Azanian People's Organisation	313	0.42	0	473	0.63	0	0
National Freedom Party				159	0.21	0	0
Total	74,909	100.00	32	75,051	100.00	32	64
Valid votes	74,909	97.59		75,051	97.72		
Invalid/blank votes	1,848	2.41		1,750	2.28		
Total votes	76,757	100.00		76,801	100.00		
Registered voters/turnout	138,008	55.62		138,008	55.65		

== August 2016 election ==
The following table shows the results of the 2016 election.

Party	Ward			List			Total seats
Party	Votes	%	Seats	Votes	%	Seats	Total seats
African National Congress	62,261	74.46	32	62,427	74.85	17	49
Economic Freedom Fighters	11,423	13.66	0	11,700	14.03	9	9
Democratic Alliance	4,059	4.85	0	4,082	4.89	3	3
Independent candidates	2,708	3.24	0				0
Sindawonye Progressive Party	1,094	1.31	0	1,254	1.50	1	1
African Independent Congress	50	0.06	0	1,543	1.85	1	1
African People's Convention	360	0.43	0	605	0.73	1	1
Ikusasa Lesizwe Independent Movement	464	0.55	0	422	0.51	0	0
African Christian Democratic Party	297	0.36	0	265	0.32	0	0
Congress of the People	253	0.30	0	265	0.32	0	0
Inkatha Freedom Party	200	0.24	0	223	0.27	0	0
Pan Africanist Congress of Azania	197	0.24	0	144	0.17	0	0
Bolsheviks Party of South Africa	118	0.14	0	204	0.24	0	0
Ingubo Yeskhethu Party	82	0.10	0	161	0.19	0	0
Asisikimeni Community Development and Advice Movement	30	0.04	0	69	0.08	0	0
Pan African Socialist Movement of Azania	19	0.02	0	44	0.05	0	0
Total	83,615	100.00	32	83,408	100.00	32	64
Valid votes	83,615	98.03		83,408	97.89		
Invalid/blank votes	1,684	1.97		1,800	2.11		
Total votes	85,299	100.00		85,208	100.00		
Registered voters/turnout	154,722	55.13		154,722	55.07		

== November 2021 election ==
The following table shows the results of the 2021 election.

Party	Ward			List			Total seats
Party	Votes	%	Seats	Votes	%	Seats	Total seats
African National Congress	36,509	60.58	30	37,469	62.68	10	40
Economic Freedom Fighters	10,274	17.05	0	11,639	19.47	12	12
Democratic Alliance	3,355	5.57	0	3,509	5.87	4	4
African Independent People's Organisation	2,326	3.86	0	2,429	4.06	3	3
Independent candidates	4,404	7.31	2				2
Sindawonye Progressive Party	873	1.45	0	1,024	1.71	1	1
Ingubo Yeskhethu Party	641	1.06	0	990	1.66	1	1
African Transformation Movement	477	0.79	0	409	0.68	1	1
African Independent Congress				816	1.37	0	0
African People's Convention	405	0.67	0	294	0.49	0	0
African Voice Progressive Party	272	0.45	0	217	0.36	0	0
Inkatha Freedom Party	148	0.25	0	296	0.50	0	0
Abantu Batho Congress	165	0.27	0	215	0.36	0	0
United Democratic Movement	189	0.31	0	166	0.28	0	0
International Revelation Congress	142	0.24	0	183	0.31	0	0
Bolsheviks Party of South Africa	83	0.14	0	122	0.20	0	0
Total	60,263	100.00	32	59,778	100.00	32	64
Valid votes	60,263	97.68		59,778	97.38		
Invalid/blank votes	1,432	2.32		1,611	2.62		
Total votes	61,695	100.00		61,389	100.00		
Registered voters/turnout	151,479	40.73		151,479	40.53		

=== By-elections from November 2021 ===
The following by-elections were held to fill vacant ward seats in the period from November 2021.

Date	Ward	Party of the previous councillor	Party of the newly elected councillor
11 Jun 2025	18	African National Congress	African National Congress
11 Jun 2025	31	African National Congress	African National Congress
