= Elleck Nchabeleng =

South African politician

The Honourable Elleck Nchabeleng MP

Permanent Delegate to the National Council of Provinces
- Incumbent
- Assumed office 23 May 2019

Member of the National Assembly
- In office 6 May 2009 – 7 May 2019
- Constituency: Limpopo

Member of the Limpopo Provincial Legislature
- In office May 2004 – May 2009

Personal details
- Born: Mamagase Elleck Nchabeleng; 29 July 1958 (age 67)
- Citizenship: South Africa
- Party: African National Congress
- Relations: Peter Nchabeleng (father)

Mamagase Elleck Nchabeleng (born 29 July 1958) is a South African politician who has represented the African National Congress (ANC) in the National Council of Provinces since 2019. He co-chairs Parliament's Joint Standing Committee on Defence and chairs the Select Committee on Education, Technology, Sports, Arts and Culture. A former anti-apartheid activist who spent time on Robben Island, he formerly served in the National Assembly from 2009 to 2019 and in the Limpopo Provincial Legislature from 2004 to 2009.

== Early life and activism ==
Nchabeleng was born on 29 July 1958 and is the son of Peter Nchabeleng, who was a prominent ANC and trade union activist in Sekhukhuneland in present-day Limpopo province. From 1976 to 1984, Elleck was imprisoned on Robben Island on charges related to his own ANC activity. After his release, he remained active in anti-apartheid organising in the Northern Transvaal and then in Johannesburg. He has a diploma in rural development planning from St. Francis Xavier University.

== Legislative career: 2004–present ==
Nchabeleng represented the ANC in the Limpopo Provincial Legislature from 2004 to 2009. In the 2009 general election, he was elected to an ANC seat in the National Assembly, the lower house of the South African Parliament. In February 2011, he was additionally elected to chair the Assembly's Portfolio Committee on Labour. He was re-elected to his seat in the 2014 general election, ranked fifth on the ANC's provincial-to-national party list for Limpopo.

In the 2019 general election, he was elected to an ANC seat in the National Council of Provinces, the upper house of Parliament. After the election, he was elected to chair the Select Committee on Education, Technology, Sports, Arts and Culture. He also became Co-Chairperson of the Joint Standing Committee on Defence, serving alongside Cyril Xaba of the National Assembly.
