= Mabelane tribe =

The Mabelane is a Northern Sotho, Northern XiTsonga Sepedi speaking, tribe that had settled in an area north-east of the town of Lydenburg (between the towns of Burgersfort on the north and Ohrigstad on the east) in South Africa.

The origin of the tribe is Cabo Mabelane, a coastal town in Southern Mozambique where the founder of the tribe, Mokgadi, came from. Mokgadi's three sons, Mareologa (eldest) and Chegoane and Letšamolodi are thought to have been the first to use the town of their father's origin as an official written surname.

The tribe was forcibly moved in the early 1960s as part of South African government's apartheid policy of settling blacks into what became known as homelands. In recent times (2005 to date) the tribe has lodged a successful land claim and have registered a Communal Property Association called Batau Baga Mabelane to administer their land. A process of compiling an official demographic of the tribe has begun. They elders use to tell stories while the children would dance around the fire
