= Ephraim Mogale =

South African politician and activist (1959–2003)

Member of the National Assembly
- In office 14 June 1999 – 2 July 2001

Personal details
- Born: Ephraim Phumuga Mogale; 6 February 1959
- Died: 2003 (aged 43–44)
- Citizenship: South Africa
- Party: African National Congress

Ephraim Phumuga Mogale (6 February 1959 – 2003) was a South African politician and former anti-apartheid activist. The inaugural president of the Congress of South African Students (COSAS), he was an underground operative for Umkhonto we Sizwe (MK) in the Northern Transvaal and was imprisoned on Robben Island from 1980 to 1985. After the end of apartheid, he represented the African National Congress (ANC) in the National Assembly and Mpumalanga Provincial Legislature.

== Early life and activism ==
Mogale, a Pedi speaker, was born on 6 February 1959. In the 1970s, he joined the outlawed ANC and, after receiving training, returned to his hometown of Moutse in the former Northern Transvaal, where he and other members of the ANC underground sought to promote the anti-apartheid youth movement by organising youth clubs and political education forums, producing pamphlets, and recruiting youths for training at MK camps abroad.

In 1979, Mogale was elected as COSAS's inaugural president. In November of that year, he and other leading members of COSAS were detained under the Terrorism Act. In late April 1980, he and another student, Thabo Makunyane, were charged with furthering the aims of the ANC. Mogale was convicted and spent five years on Robben Island.

Upon his release in October 1985, Mogale resumed his anti-apartheid activism. Between 1986 and 1990, he was an underground MK operative in the Transvaal, primarily involved in smuggling weapons into the country and distributing them to activists by means of dead letter boxes.

== Legislative career ==
In the 1999 general election, Mogale stood for the ANC as a candidate for election to the National Assembly. He narrowly missed election but was sworn in shortly after the election, on 14 June 1999; he replaced Thabo Mbeki, who by law ceded his seat once the assembly elected him as President of South Africa. Mogale served in the seat for just over a year, resigning on 2 July 2001; he was replaced by Louisa Mabe. Mogale, in turn, filled a casual vacancy in the Mpumalanga Provincial Legislature.

== Death ==
He died in a car accident in 2003. He is the namesake of the Ephraim Mogale Local Municipality in Limpopo (the former Northern Transvaal).
