= Louis Mnguni =

South African politician and diplomat

South African High Commissioner to Nigeria
- In office April 2013 – February 2018
- President: Jacob Zuma

Personal details
- Born: Lulu Louis Aaron Mnguni
- Citizenship: South Africa
- Party: African National Congress

Lulu Louis Aaron Mnguni is a South African politician, diplomat, and former anti-apartheid activist. During the 1980s, he was the chairperson of the United Democratic Front (UDF) in the Northern Transvaal while lecturing in the philosophy department at the University of the North. He represented the African National Congress (ANC) in the National Assembly during the first democratic Parliament before joining the diplomatic service in 1999.

== Career during apartheid ==
In the 1980s, Mnguni was a philosophy lecturer at the University of the North. In 1985, he was elected as the inaugural vice-chairperson of the UDF's Northern Transvaal branch, deputising Peter Nchabeleng and serving alongside secretary Joyce Mabudafhasi. When Nchabeleng was detained (and later killed) by Lebowa police, Mnguni acted as UDF regional chairperson.

Mnguni was also frequently detained for his anti-apartheid activism. During the 1986 state of emergency, which was accompanied by a wide-ranging police crackdown, Mnguni became one of the longest-serving detainees; he was detained without trial between June 1986 and February 1989, and was hospitalised twice during that time.

== Post-apartheid career ==
In South Africa's first post-apartheid elections in 1994, Mnguni was elected to represent the ANC in the National Assembly. After a single term in the seat, in 1999, he was appointed as the inaugural South African High Commissioner to Mauritius and the Seychelles, where he served from 1999 to 2003. He was appointed as inaugural Ambassador to Guinea-Bissau in 2008, and he later served as High Commissioner to Nigeria from 2013 to 2018.
