= Apel, Limpopo =

Apel
- Location within Limpopo Location within South Africa
- Coordinates: 24.420°S 29.752°E
- Country: South Africa
- Province: Limpopo
- District: Sekhukhune
- Municipality: Fetakgomo Tubatse

Area
  - Total: 1.45 km^{2} (0.56 sq mi)

Population (2011)
  - Total: 1,033
  - Density: 712/km^{2} (1,850/sq mi)

Racial makeup (2011)
  - Black African: 99.8%
  - Other: 0.2%

First languages (2011)
  - Northern Sotho: 97.9%
  - Other: 2.1%
- Time zone: UTC+2 (SAST)
- PO box: 0739
- Area code: 015

Apel is a village in Sekhukhune District Municipality in the Limpopo province of South Africa.
