= Jane Furse =

Jane Furse Mmašadi
- Location within Limpopo Location within South Africa
- Coordinates: 24.761°S 29.877°E
- Country: South Africa
- Province: Limpopo
- District: Sekhukhune
- Municipality: Makhuduthamaga

Area
  - Total: 8.00 km^{2} (3.09 sq mi)

Population (2011)
  - Total: 6,533
  - Density: 817/km^{2} (2,120/sq mi)

Racial makeup (2011)
  - Black African: 99.6%
  - Indian/Asian: 0.3%
  - Other: 0.1%

First languages (2011)
  - Northern Sotho: 85.0%
  - Swazi: 3.6%
  - Zulu: 3.1%
  - English: 2.8%
  - Other: 5.6%
- Time zone: UTC+2 (SAST)

Jane Furse is a town in the Sekhukhune District Municipality of the Limpopo province in South Africa, surrounded by the villages of Ga-Moretsele, Madibong, Marulaneng, Mamone, Mokwete and Riverside.

Significant landmarks in Jane Furse include Jane Furse Plaza, Jane Furse Memorial Hospital (the largest public sector hospital in the Sekhukhune District), St Mark's College, and Jane Furse Comprehensive School. Jane Furse Crossing, another shopping centre, opened in 2013 and is situated at the main four-way intersection in the town.

== History ==
Jane Furse developed around the Jane Furse Memorial Hospital and other infrastructure - including schools, clinics and churches - built by Christian missionaries belonging to the Anglican and Roman Catholic denominations. The Jane Furse Memorial Hospital was founded by the Rt. Revd Michael Furse, the Anglican Bishop of Pretoria from 1909 - 1920, and is named after his daughter, Jane Diana Furse, born 1904, who died of scarlet fever in 1918. Christian missionaries were also responsible for the construction of St. Rita's Hospital (situated at Ga-Moloi village) and St. Marks College (situated in the heart of Jane Furse).

== Government ==
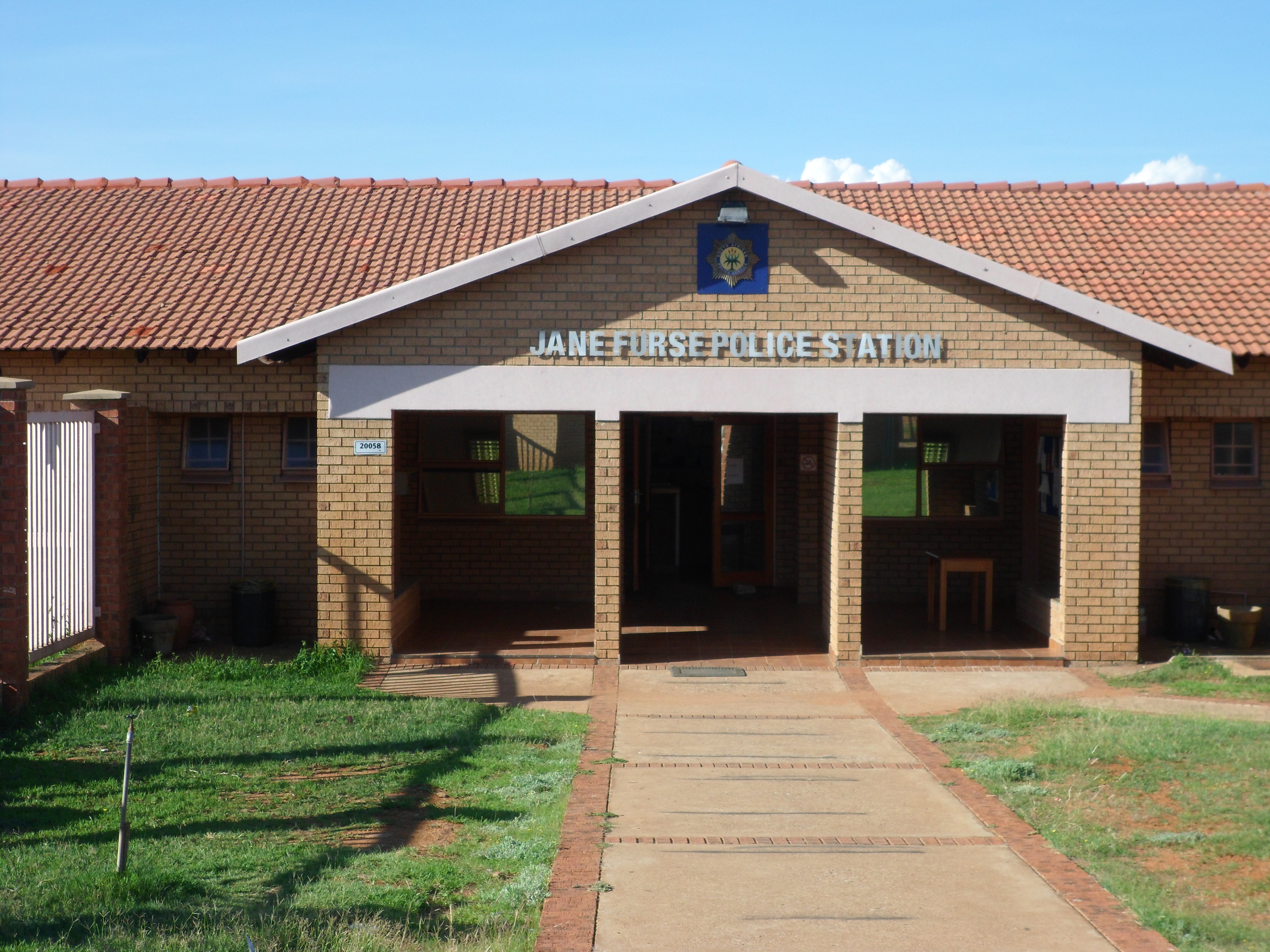
Jane Furse Police Station (Pic: @NelsonKgwete)

Jane Furse serves as the seat of the Makhuduthamaga Local Municipality, one of the four local municipalities under the Sekhukhune District.

Most of the land in Jane Furse falls under the authority of traditional leaders, known as magoshi (singular = kgoshi).

The area is governed by the African National Congress (ANC). The Economic Freedom Fighters (EFF) serves as the main opposition party.

== Culture ==
The town is host to the Sekhukhune Community Radio. Other media serving the area include Thobela FM, the Polokwane-based South African Broadcasting Corporation (SABC) radio station and Capricorn FM, a commercial radio station also based in Polokwane.

A unique genre of music is found in Jane Furse and surrounding areas. Known as "Tja Manyalo" (wedding songs), this type of music is almost exclusively produced in and around Sekhukhune areas.

Sepedi is the predominant language spoken in Jane Furse. Other languages spoken here include Swati and Southern Ndebele.

=== Education ===
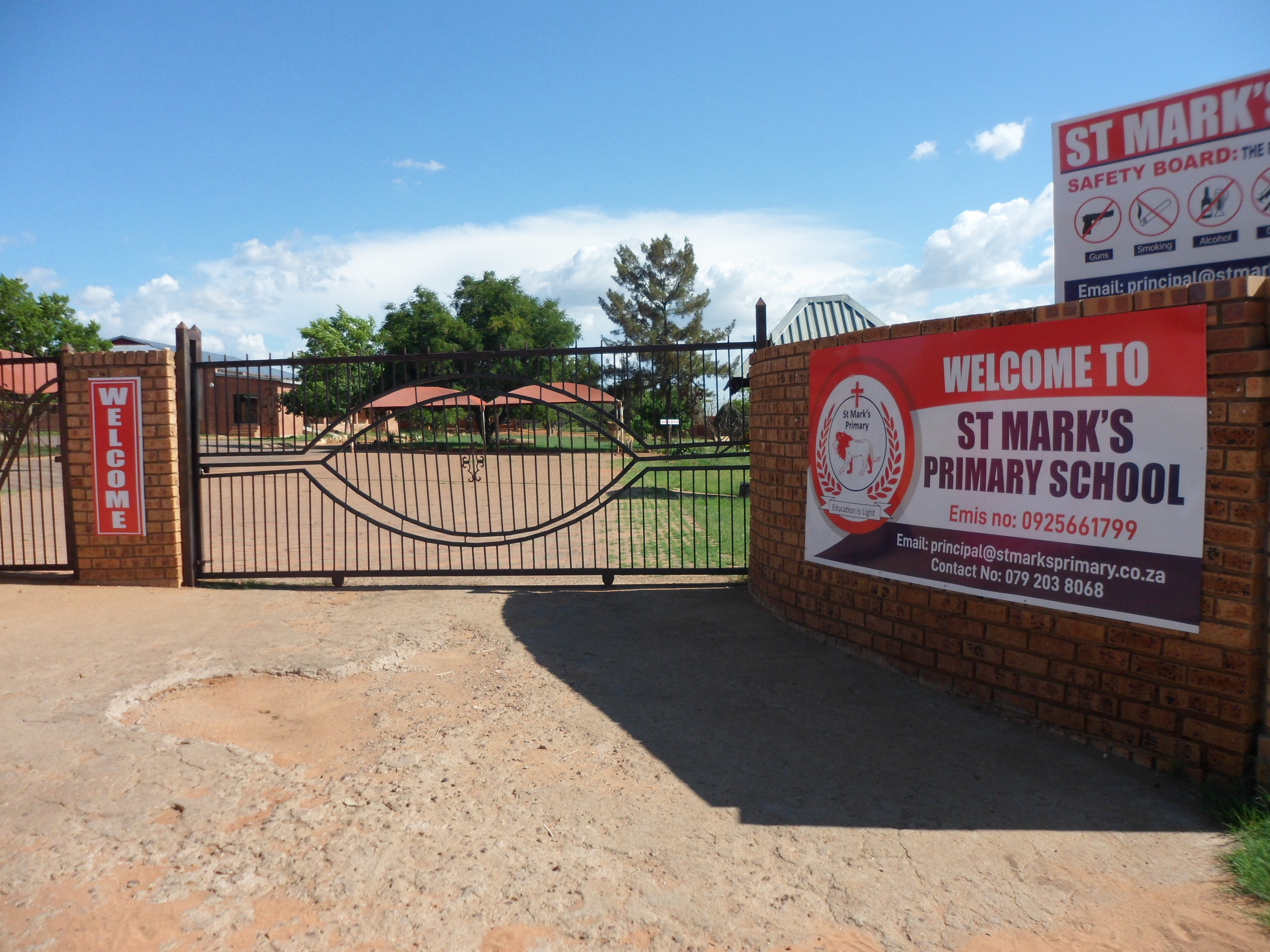
St. Marks Primary School, Jane Furse. (Pic: @NelsonKgwete)

Several primary and secondary schools are located in Jane Furse, catering to a student population estimated at 90,000. Most of the schools are public, with one private school and one private FET College. The list is as follows:

- Jane Furse City College
- Leap Science and Maths School
- St Mark's College
- St. Mark's Primary School
- Jane Furse Comprehensive School
- Jane Furse Primary School
- Arethabeng Primary School
- Bafedi Primary School
- Baropodi Comprehensive
- Kgolane Secondary School
- Lengama Secondary School
- Madibong Primary School
- Matsebong Secondary School
- Ngwana-matlang Secondary school
- Moretsele primary School
- Mookwane Primary School
- Lehutjwana Secondary School
- Bonega-Madikubung Primary School
- Dikgabje Primary School
- Mashegoanyane Primary School
- Kopanong Primary School
- Rebone Secondary School
- Thulare Primary School
- Mpilo Secondary School

== Health facilities ==
=== Hospitals serving the area ===
- New Jane Furse Hospital
- St Ritas Hospital

=== Clinics ===
- Ditšhweung Community Clinic
- Madibong Community Clinic

== Notable people ==
The following is a list of notable people associated with Jane Furse.

- Manche Masemola, Christian martyr
- Kgoshi Mampuru (died 22 November 1883), after whom the Kgoshi Mampuru prison and street, both in Pretoria, are named
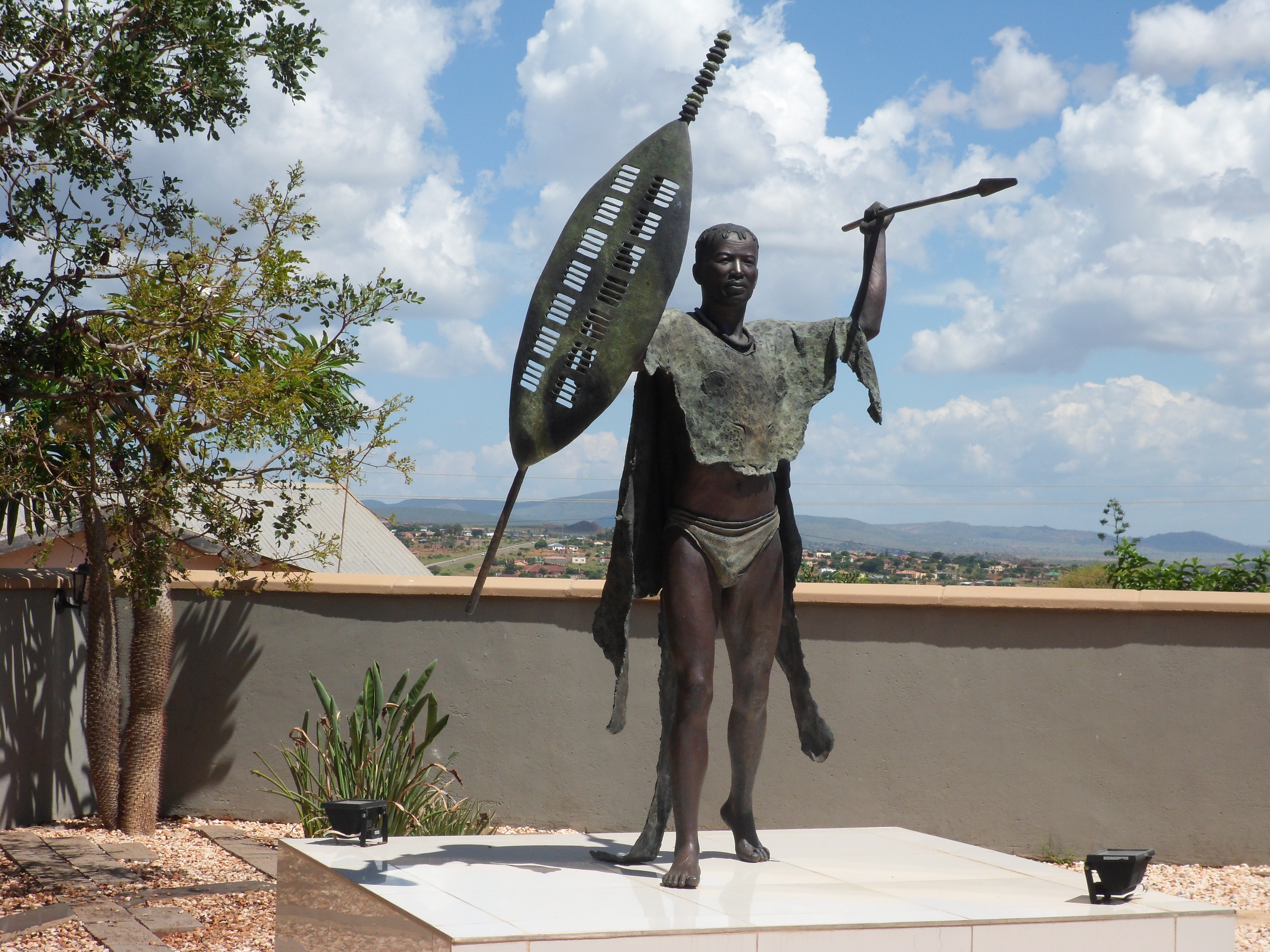
- Statue of Kgoshi Mampuru II at a monument in Mamone village. (Pic: @NelsonKgwete)
  Godfrey Pitje, teacher, anti-apartheid activist and President of the ANC Youth League, succeeded by Nelson Mandela in 1951.
- Aaron Motsoaledi, Minister of Health
- Joe Phaahla, Deputy Minister of Health
- Namane Dickson Masemola, Member of Parliament, Deputy Minister of Cooperative Governance and Traditional Affairs, member of the National Executive Committee (NEC) of the African National Congress.
- Elias Phakane Moretsele ANC anti-apartheid activist and 1956 Treason Trialist
- Edgar Marutlulle, Blue Bulls Rugby former player and coach,
- Mpho Makwana, businessman and former chairman of the board of directors of Eskom
- Prof. Malegapuru Makgoba, leading South African immunologist, physician, public health advocate, academic, former Health Ombudsman and former vice-chancellor of the University of KwaZulu-Natal.
- John Kgwana Nkadimeng, anti-apartheid activist, 1956 Treason Trialist, former ambassador to Cuba and recipient of the national Order of Luthuli.
