= Dumisa =

South African Christian television channel

Dumisa is a 24-hour digital satellite television African Christianity channel produced by Urban Brew Studios for DStv. This is Urban Brew's second religious channel, the first being One Gospel. Unlike its sister channel, Dumisa channel focuses on African indigenous Christian values, Zion and Clap n Tap music, lifestyle and culture, and praise and worship.
