= Burgersfort =

Burgersfort Tubatse Platinum City
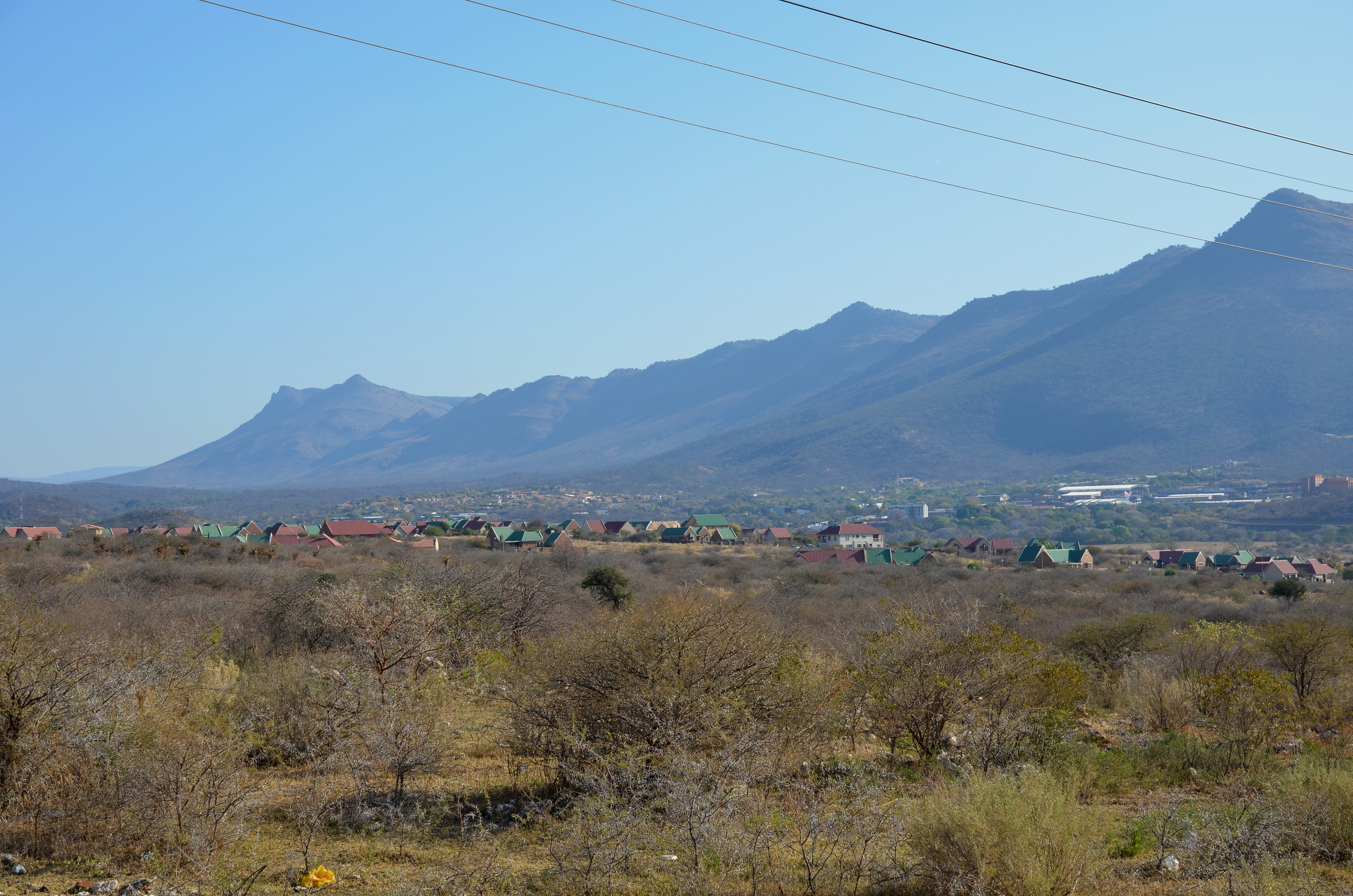
- View on Burgersfort

- Location within Limpopo Location within South Africa
- Coordinates: 24°40′S 30°19′E
- Country: South Africa
- Province: Limpopo
- District: Sekhukhune
- Municipality: Fetakgomo Tubatse

Area
  - Total: 28.10 km^{2} (10.85 sq mi)

Population (2011)
  - Total: 6,369
  - Density: 226.7/km^{2} (587.0/sq mi)

Racial makeup (2011)
  - Black African: 65.6%
  - Coloured: 3.2%
  - Indian/Asian: 4.8%
  - White: 25.8%
  - Other: 0.6%

First languages (2011)
  - Sepedi language: 31.3%
  - Afrikaans: 27.9%
  - English: 16.8%
  - Zulu: 3.8%
  - Other: 20.1%
- Time zone: UTC+2 (SAST)
- Postal code (street): 1150
- PO box: 1150
- Area code: 013

Burgersfort is located in the valley of the Spekboom River at the edge of the Bushveld Complex in the Fetakgomo Tubatse Local Municipality of the Limpopo province of South Africa, near the border with the Mpumalanga province. The town was named after a hexagonal fort built there during the 1876-77 Second War against the Bapedi of King Sekhukhune, and was named after President TF Burgers of the ZAR. The town serves as a meeting point for two major roads, the R37 and R555. The region is rich in platinum and platinum group metals. The town's neighbouring towns are Mashishing (60 km), Steelpoort (16 km) and Ohrigstad (26 km).
