= Ephraim Mogale Local Municipality =

Ephraim Mogale
- Local municipality
- Seal

- Location in Limpopo
- Coordinates: 24°55′S 29°20′E
- Country: South Africa
- Province: Limpopo
- District: Sekhukhune
- Seat: Marble Hall
- Wards: 16

Government
  - Type: Municipal council
  - Mayor: Bella Kupa

Area
  - Total: 2,011 km^{2} (776 sq mi)

Population (2011)
  - Total: 123,648
  - Density: 61.49/km^{2} (159.2/sq mi)

Racial makeup (2011)
  - Black African: 97.8%
  - Coloured: 0.1%
  - Indian/Asian: 0.2%
  - White: 1.6%

First languages (2011)
  - Sepedi: 78.8%
  - Tsonga: 6.9%
  - Southern Ndebele: 3.8%
  - Zulu: 2.2%
  - Other: 8.3%
- Time zone: UTC+2 (SAST)
- Municipal code: LIM471

Ephraim Mogale Municipality (Northern Sotho: Mmasepala wa Ephraim Mogale), known until 28 January 2010 as the Greater Marble Hall Municipality, is a local municipality within the Sekhukhune District Municipality, in the Limpopo province of South Africa. The seat is Marble Hall.

The municipality is named after Ephraim Phumuga Mogale, a South African freedom fighter.

== Main places ==
The 2001 census divided the municipality into the following main places:

Place	Code	Area (km^{2})	Population	Most spoken language
Elandskraal	98301	2.34	5,590	Northern Sotho
Marble Hall	88302	7.76	2,780	Afrikaans
Matlala	98302	678.08	35,108	Northern Sotho
Mokerong	98303	61.02	0	-
Moutse 1	88303	167.51	36,941	Northern Sotho
Nebo	98304	0.25	1,185	Northern Sotho
Mokopane	98305	2.62	1,405	Northern Sotho
Rahlangane Part 1	98306	61.65	18,695	Northern Sotho
Rahlangane Part 2	88304	1.58	39	Northern Sotho
Van der Merwe's Kraal	98307	2.05	4,877	Northern Sotho
Remainder of the municipality	88301	807.00	14,686	Northern Sotho

== Politics ==
The municipal council consists of thirty-two members elected by mixed-member proportional representation. Sixteen councillors are elected by first-past-the-post voting in sixteen wards, while the remaining sixteen are chosen from party lists so that the total number of party representatives is proportional to the number of votes received. In the election of 1 November 2021, the African National Congress (ANC) won a majority of nineteen seats on the council.

The following table shows the results of the election.

Party	Ward			List			Total seats
Party	Votes	%	Seats	Votes	%	Seats	Total seats
African National Congress	14,546	57.15	13	15,967	64.29	6	19
Economic Freedom Fighters	4,851	19.06	0	5,374	21.64	7	7
Independent candidates	2,947	11.58	2				2
Democratic Alliance	1,237	4.86	1	1,339	5.39	1	2
Bolsheviks Party of South Africa	389	1.53	0	399	1.61	1	1
Freedom Front Plus	382	1.50	0	373	1.50	1	1
14 other parties	1,100	4.32	0	1,382	5.56	0	0
Total	25,452	100.00	16	24,834	100.00	16	32
Valid votes	25,452	98.46		24,834	96.12		
Invalid/blank votes	399	1.54		1,002	3.88		
Total votes	25,851	100.00		25,836	100.00		
Registered voters/turnout	58,432	44.24		58,432	44.22		

== Sports ==
Local sports teams in Ephraim Mogale Local Municipality include FC Maginim Ephraim Mogale, a football club.
