= Steelpoort =

- Location within Limpopo Location within South Africa
- Coordinates: 24.73°S 30.20°E
- Country: South Africa
- Province: Limpopo
- District: Sekhukhune
- Municipality: Fetakgomo Tubatse

Area
  - Total: 3.11 km^{2} (1.20 sq mi)

Population (2011)
  - Total: 1,105
  - Density: 355/km^{2} (920/sq mi)

Racial makeup (2011)
  - Black African: 66.0%
  - Coloured: 4.2%
  - Indian/Asian: 1.2%
  - White: 28.5%
  - Other: 0.1%

First languages (2011)
  - Sepedi: 34.5%
  - Afrikaans: 33.3%
  - English: 11.7%
  - Zulu: 3.6%
  - Other: 17.0%
- Time zone: UTC+2 (SAST)
- Postal code (street): 1133
- PO box: 1133
- Area code: 013

Steelpoort is a mining town in an urban settlement on the R555 road in Sekhukhune District Municipality in the Limpopo province of South Africa. It is located on the border with Mpumalanga province.

Mining operations around Steelpoort include the Dwarsrivier chrome mine (30 km from Steelpoort, located in Mpumalanga) owned by Assmang, Tweefontein chrome mine and Tubatse Ferrochrome, owned by Samancor, Two Rivers and Modikwa platinum mines managed by Patrice Motsepe’s African Rainbow Minerals, as well as Mototolo platinum mine and the Lion Ferrochrome smelter, both owned by Xstrata and Marula Platinum (Pty) Ltd owned by Impala Platinum.

The name Steelpoort is believed to be derived from a hunting expedition that took place either in the late 19th century or the early 20th century. When a group of Voortrekkers from Natal under Frans Joubert had settled there, a man called Scholtz shot an elephant at dusk and on returning next morning found that the tusks had been removed. The river flowing through the poort was then called Steelpoort River (‘steel’ meaning steal). An increase in the mining of chrome and magnetite led to the construction of a railway line between Steelpoort and Lydenburg in 1924.
