= Groblersdal =

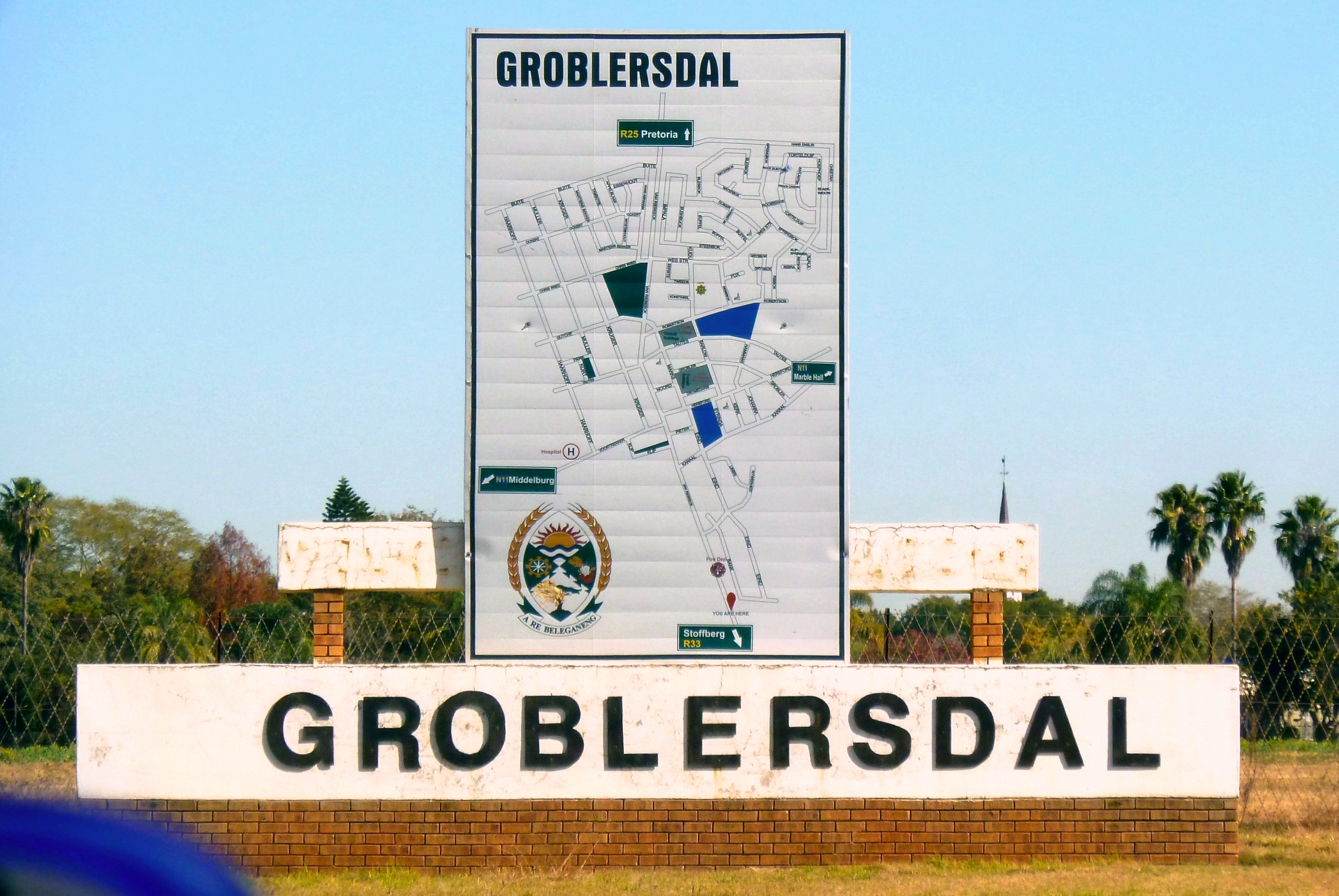
- Town limit sign

- Location within Limpopo Location within South Africa
- Coordinates: 25°09′S 29°23′E
- Country: South Africa
- Province: Limpopo
- District: Sekhukhune
- Municipality: Elias Motsoaledi

Area
  - Total: 5.79 km^{2} (2.24 sq mi)
- Elevation: 920 m (3,020 ft)

Population (2011)
  - Total: 4,329
  - Density: 748/km^{2} (1,940/sq mi)

Racial makeup (2011)
  - Black African: 47.3%
  - Coloured: 0.8%
  - Indian/Asian: 3.6%
  - White: 47.6%
  - Other: 0.7%

First languages (2011)
  - Afrikaans: 50.1%
  - Sepedi: 25.3%
  - English: 7.0%
  - Zulu: 3.5%
  - Other: 14.2%
- Time zone: UTC+2 (SAST)
- Postal code (street): 0470
- PO box: 0470
- Area code: 013
- Website: https://www.limpopo-info.co.za/provinces/town/667/groblersdal

Groblersdal is a farming town situated 32 km north of the 178 million m³ Loskop Dam in the Sekhukhune District of Limpopo.

The town is South Africa's second largest irrigation settlement. The main crops in this man-made floodplain are cotton, tobacco, citrus fruit, table grapes, maize, wheat, vegetables, sunflower seeds, peanuts, lucerne and peaches, although not in order of importance as some previously leading crops e.g. tobacco, have made way for others such as grapes.

Groblersdal was laid out on the farm "Klipbank" taking advantage of the Loskop Dam, and named after the original owner WJ Grobler.

Notable people from Groblersdal include Roma Blecher, noted philanthropist and Shakespeare scholar, and South African Test bowler Duanne Olivier (born 1992).

== See also ==
- Jaco van der Westhuyzen
