= Sekhukhuneland =

Coordinates: 24°26′S 29°57′E

- Natural region
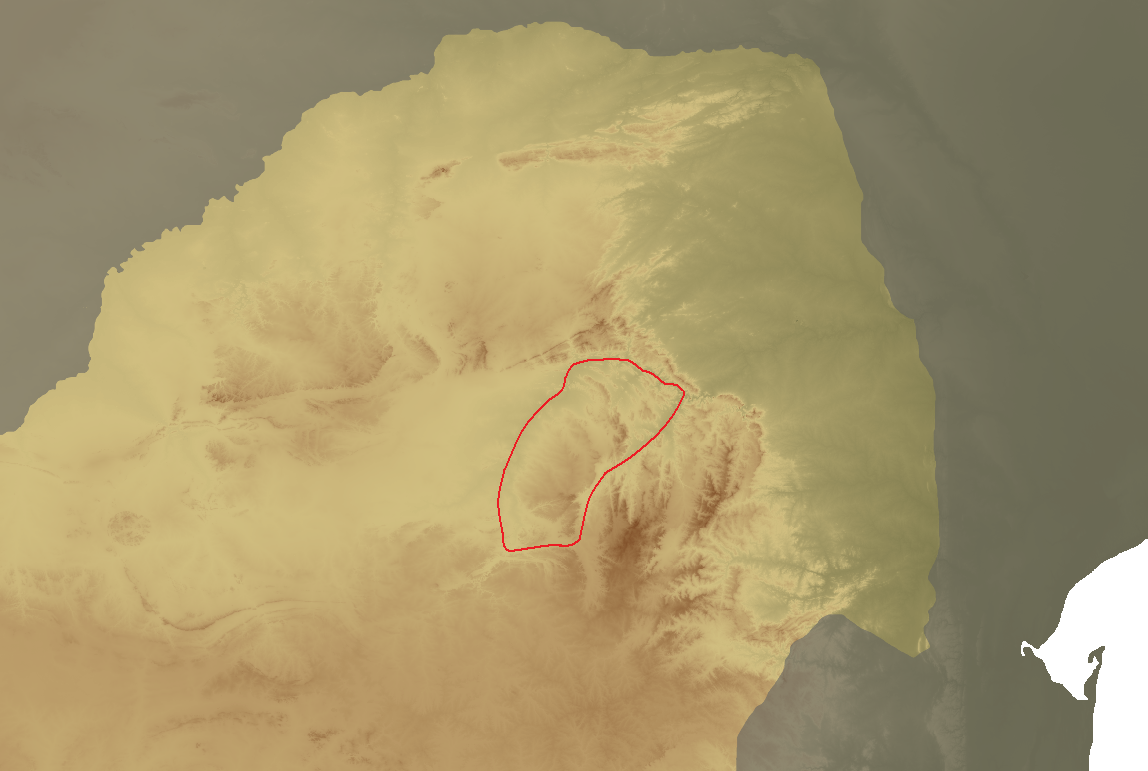
- Sekhukhuneland
- Country: South Africa

Location of Sekhukhuneland in South Africa

Sekhukhuneland or Sekukuniland (Afrikaans: Sekoekoeniland) is a natural region in north-east South Africa, located in the historical Transvaal zone, former Transvaal Province, also known as Bopedi (meaning “land of Bapedi”). The region is named after the 19th-century King, Sekhukhune I.

== Geography ==
This region is mainly covered by savannah grassland and was inhabited traditionally by the Bapedi in an area stretching across central and northern Transvaal.

Sekhukhuneland lies in present-day Limpopo and Mpumalanga provinces, between the Olifants River (Lepelle) and its tributary the Steelpoort River (Tubatse); bordered on the east by the Drakensberg Range, and crossed by the Thaba Ya Sekhukhune in the southeast and the Leolo Mountains in the north.

== History ==
At the height of the Pedi power under Thulare, about 1790–1820, historical Sekhukhuneland included an area stretching from the site of present-day Rustenburg in the west to the Lowveld in the east, and ranging as far south as the Vaal river.

The area under Pedi control was severely limited after the military campaigns by British troops in 1879. Following their defeat native reserves were created for the Pedi and for other northern Sotho people groups by the Transvaal Republic's Native Location Commission.

Between 1972 and 1994 part of Sekhukhuneland was included in the Lebowa bantustan. The territory was not contiguous, being divided into two major and several minor portions. Having been intended as a homeland for the Northern Sotho-speaking tribes such as the Pedi, Lebowa included swathes of Sekukuniland. However, various other non-Northern Sotho-speaking tribes, including the Northern Ndebele, Batswana and VhaTsonga lived in the bantustan as well.

Sekukuniland is named after Pedi chief Sekhukhune or Sekukuni, who succeeded Sekwati in 1860 or 1861, and it is the only native region in South Africa named after a famous local chief. Present day Sekhukhune District Municipality in Limpopo Province is named after this natural region.

South African artist Johannes Segogela, renowned internationally for his wooden sculptures, was born in Sekukuniland in 1936.

== See also ==
- History of South Africa
- Lebowa
- Limpopo Province
- Sekukhune Flat Lizard
- The Contemporary African Art Collection (CAAC)

== Bibliography ==
- Winter, Johannes August (n.d.). The Mental and Moral Capabilities of the Natives, Especially of Sekukuniland (Eastern Transvaal): The Study of South African Native Languages.
- A L Hall, The geology of Sekukuniland : an explanation of sheet 8 (Sekukuniland), Government Printing and Sationery Office, Pretoria 1911
- Roberts, Noel; Winter, C. A. T. (July 1916). "The kgoma, or initiation rites of the Bapedi of Sekukuniland". South African Journal of Science. 12 (12). Cape Town: 561–578.
- Pretorius, A. M. F. (1994). Inventory of the archives of the Native Affairs Commissioner, Sekukuniland 1902-1961. Transvaal Archives Depot. ISBN 9780797030183.
