= Makhuduthamaga Local Municipality =

Makhuduthamaga
- Local municipality
- Seal

- Location in Limpopo
- Coordinates: 24°45′S 29°45′E
- Country: South Africa
- Province: Limpopo
- District: Sekhukhune
- Seat: Jane Furse (Mmašadi)
- Wards: 31

Government
  - Type: Municipal council
  - Mayor: Minah Bahula (ANC)

Area
  - Total: 2,097 km^{2} (810 sq mi)

Population (2011)
  - Total: 274,358
  - Density: 130.8/km^{2} (338.9/sq mi)

Racial makeup (2011)
  - Black African: 99.7%
  - Coloured: 0.0%
  - Indian/Asian: 0.1%
  - White: 0.1%

First languages (2011)
  - Northern Sotho: 93.8%
  - Swazi: 1.5%
  - Zulu: 1.4%
  - Other: 3.3%
- Time zone: UTC+2 (SAST)
- Municipal code: LIM473

Makhuduthamaga Municipality (Northern Sotho: Mmasepala wa Makhuduthamaga) is a local municipality within Sekhukhune District Municipality, in the Limpopo province of South Africa.

== Main places ==
The 2001 census divided the municipality into the following main places:

Place	Code	Area (km^{2})	Population	Most spoken language
Kwena Madihlaba	92001	64.20	16,807	Sepedi
Kwena Mashabela	92002	81.55	5,261	Sepedi
Mampane	92003	5.13	6,257	Sepedi
Masemola	92004	439.21	33,403	Sepedi
Matlala	92005	2.28	1,481	Sepedi
Morwangwato	92006	309.91	17,208	Sepedi
Ndebele	92007	1.63	894	Sepedi
Pedi Mamone	92008	259.95	44,324	Sepedi
Phokwane	92009	249.09	41,630	Sepedi
Roka Phasha Phokoane	92010	95.88	8,853	Sepedi
SMN	92011	574.06	82,018	Sepedi
Tisane	92012	17.10	3,777	Sepedi
Vergelegen	92013	0.57	979	Sepedi
Ga-Mohlala	92014	2.57	4.566	Sepedi
Ga-Seopela	92011	776,6	14.376	Sepedi

== Politics ==
The municipal council consists of sixty-two members elected by mixed-member proportional representation. Thirty-one councillors are elected by first-past-the-post voting in thirty-one wards, while the remaining thirty-one are chosen from party lists so that the total number of party representatives is proportional to the number of votes received. In the election of 3 August 2016, the African National Congress (ANC) won a majority of forty-three seats on the council. The following table shows the results of the election.

Party	Votes				Seats		
Party	Ward	List	Total	%	Ward	List	Total
ANC	42,671	46,667	85,338	68.0	31	12	43
EFF	13,652	13,641	27,293	21.7	0	14	14
DA	2,157	2,102	4,259	3.4	0	2	2
African People's Socialist Party	1,130	1,068	2,198	1.8	0	1	1
AZAPO	718	780	1,498	1.2	0	1	1
South African Maintenance and Estate Beneficiaries Association	706	711	1,417	1.1	0	1	1
Independent	931	–	931	0.7	0	–	0
Others	1,014	1,635	2,649	2.1	0	0	0
Total	62,979	62,604	125,583	100.0	31	31	62
Spoilt votes	1,070	1,276	2,346				
