= Elias Motsoaledi Local Municipality =

Coordinates: 25°10′S 29°35′E

Elias Motsoaledi
- Local municipality
- Seal

- Location in Limpopo
- Country: South Africa
- Province: Limpopo
- District: Sekhukhune
- Seat: Groblersdal
- Wards: 30

Government
  - Type: Municipal council
  - Mayor Cllr David Magetle Tladi: David Magetle Tladi (ANC)

Area
  - Total: 3,713 km^{2} (1,434 sq mi)

Population (2011)
  - Total: 249,363
  - Density: 67.16/km^{2} (173.9/sq mi)

Racial makeup (2011)
  - Black African: 97.9%
  - Coloured: 0.1%
  - Indian/Asian: 0.2%
  - White: 1.6%

First languages (2011)
  - Northern Sotho: 58.9%
  - Southern Ndebele: 14.9%
  - Zulu: 8.9%
  - Tswana: 6.2%
  - Other: 11.1%
- Time zone: UTC+2 (SAST)
- Municipal code: LIM472

Elias Motsoaledi Municipality (Northern Sotho: Mmasepala wa Elias Motsoaledi; Southern Ndebele: UMasipaladi ye Elias Motsoaledi), formerly the Greater Groblersdal Municipality, is a local municipality within the Sekhukhune District Municipality, in the Limpopo province of South Africa. The seat of the municipality is Groblersdal. It is named in honour of the anti-apartheid activist Elias Motsoaledi.

== Main places ==
The 2001 census divided the municipality into the following main places:

Place	Code	Area (km^{2})	Population	Most spoken language
Bakwena	98401	0.35	682	Northern Sotho
Barokgoga Bakopa	98402	0.39	756	Northern Sotho
Greater Groblersdal	98403	146.78	2,556	Northern Sotho
Groblersdal	88402	6.26	2,480	Afrikaans
Mathula	88403	67.91	17,576	Southern Ndebele
Matsepe	98404	4.74	1,179	Northern Sotho
Motetema Part 1	98405	1.09	3,739	Northern Sotho
Motetema Part 2	88404	0.60	767	Northern Sotho
Moutse 3 Part 1	98406	0.39	935	Northern Sotho
Moutse 3 Part 2	88405	324.85	97,618	Northern Sotho
Ndebele	98407	220.83	48,914	Northern Sotho
Nebo	98408	142.06	31,888	Northern Sotho
Remainder of the municipality	88401	2,757.08	11,646	Northern Sotho

== Politics ==
The municipal council consists of sixty-one members elected by mixed-member proportional representation. Thirty-one councillors are elected by first-past-the-post voting in thirty-one wards, while the remaining thirty are chosen from party lists so that the total number of party representatives is proportional to the number of votes received. In the election of 1 November 2021, the African National Congress (ANC) won a majority of 36 seats on the council. The following table shows the results of the election.

Party	Ward			List			Total seats
Party	Votes	%	Seats	Votes	%	Seats	Total seats
African National Congress	27,547	57.80	27	27,729	58.66	9	36
Economic Freedom Fighters	10,110	21.21	3	10,395	21.99	11	14
Democratic Alliance	2,984	6.26	1	3,063	6.48	3	4
Bolsheviks Party of South Africa	1,612	3.38	0	1,573	3.33	2	2
Mpumalanga Party	1,419	2.98	0	1,544	3.27	2	2
Freedom Front Plus	860	1.80	0	782	1.65	1	1
Independent candidates	1,006	2.11	0				0
Answer for Community	468	0.98	0	441	0.93	1	1
Dennilton Residents Association	351	0.74	0	330	0.70	1	1
12 other parties	1,302	2.73	0	1,415	2.99	0	0
Total	47,659	100.00	31	47,272	100.00	30	61
Valid votes	47,659	98.05		47,272	97.67		
Invalid/blank votes	950	1.95		1,126	2.33		
Total votes	48,609	100.00		48,398	100.00		
Registered voters/turnout	120,057	40.49		120,057	40.31		
