= South African Maintenance and Estate Beneficiaries Association =

Political party in South Africa

- Leader: Makgorometse Gift Makhaba
- National Assembly seats: 0 / 400
- Provincial Legislatures: 0 / 430

The South African Maintenance and Estate Beneficiaries Association (SAMEBA) is a South African political party. Their platform is made up of two main elements; child maintenance and beneficiaries of estates.

The party contested the 2014 general election in Limpopo province and contested the 2019 general election, failing to win any seats.

== Election results ==
=== National elections ===
Election	Total votes	Share of vote	Seats	+/–	Government
2019	2,445	0.01%	0 / 400	–	extraparliamentary

=== Provincial elections ===
Election	Eastern Cape		Free State		Gauteng		Kwazulu-Natal		Limpopo		Mpumalanga		North-West		Northern Cape		Western Cape	
Election	%	Seats	%	Seats	%	Seats	%	Seats	%	Seats	%	Seats	%	Seats	%	Seats	%	Seats
2014	–	–	–	–	–	–	–	–	0.08%	0/49	–	–	–	–	–	–	–	–

=== Municipal elections ===
Election	Votes	%
2016	5,637	0.01%
