= Bolsheviks Party of South Africa =

Political party in South Africa

- President: Fanie Mogotji
- Ideology: Marxism-Leninism; Egalitarianism; Anti-racism
- Political position: Left-wing
- National Assembly seats: 0 / 400
- Provincial Legislatures: 0 / 430

Website
- bolsheviks.yolasite.com

The Bolsheviks Party of South Africa is a South African political party based in Limpopo.

It is campaigning for a more egalitarian society, and for the Moutse area to be transferred from Limpopo to Mpumalanga province.

The party competed in the 2016 Municipal election, winning three seats in the Elias Motsoaledi Local Municipality (part of the Sekhukhune District Municipality), and contested the 2019 general election in Limpopo province, failing to win a seat.

== Election results ==
=== Provincial elections ===
Election	Eastern Cape		Free State		Gauteng		Kwazulu-Natal		Limpopo		Mpumalanga		North-West		Northern Cape		Western Cape	
Election	%	Seats	%	Seats	%	Seats	%	Seats	%	Seats	%	Seats	%	Seats	%	Seats	%	Seats
2019									0.14%	0/49								
2024					0.02%	0/80			0.23%	0/64	0.09%	0/51						

=== Municipal elections ===
Election	Votes	%
2016	9,632	0.02%
2021	9,371	0.03%
