= Fetakgomo Tubatse Local Municipality =

Fetakgomo Tubatse FTM
- Local municipality
- Map of Limpopo with Fetakgomo/Tubatse highlighted
- Country: South Africa
- Province: Limpopo
- District: Greater Sekhukhune
- Seat: Burgersfort

Government
  - Type: Municipal council

Area
  - Total: 5,693 km^{2} (2,198 sq mi)

Population (2011)
  - Total: 429,471
  - Density: 75.44/km^{2} (195.4/sq mi)
- Time zone: UTC+2 (SAST)
- Municipal code: LIM476

Fetakgomo Tubatse Municipality (Northern Sotho: Mmasepala wa Fetakgomo Tubatse) is a local municipality within the Greater Sekhukhune District Municipality, in the Limpopo province of South Africa. It was established after the August 2016 local elections by merging the Fetakgomo and Greater Tubatse local municipalities.

== Politics ==
The municipal council consists of seventy-seven members elected by mixed-member proportional representation. Thirty-nine councillors are elected by first-past-the-post voting in thirty-nine wards, while the remaining thirty-eight are chosen from party lists so that the total number of party representatives is proportional to the number of votes received. In the election of 1 November 2021, the African National Congress (ANC) won a majority of fifty-four seats on the council. The following table shows the results of the election.

Party	Ward			List			Total seats
Party	Votes	%	Seats	Votes	%	Seats	Total seats
African National Congress	54,338	66.62	39	56,665	69.75	15	54
Economic Freedom Fighters	13,651	16.74	0	14,161	17.43	14	14
Independent candidates	4,504	5.52	0				0
Socialist Agenda of Dispossessed Africans	1,595	1.96	0	2,072	2.55	2	2
Democratic Alliance	1,604	1.97	0	1,717	2.11	2	2
Azanian People's Organisation	846	1.04	0	806	0.99	1	1
Power of Africans Unity	687	0.84	0	899	1.11	1	1
Freedom Front Plus	611	0.75	0	564	0.69	1	1
Bolsheviks Party of South Africa	607	0.74	0	521	0.64	1	1
Pan Africanist Congress of Azania	489	0.60	0	600	0.74	1	1
17 other parties	2,636	3.23	0	3,230	3.98	0	0
Total	81,568	100.00	39	81,235	100.00	38	77
Valid votes	81,568	98.41		81,235	97.77		
Invalid/blank votes	1,317	1.59		1,850	2.23		
Total votes	82,885	100.00		83,085	100.00		
Registered voters/turnout	200,184	41.40		200,184	41.50		
