= Sekhukhune District Municipality =

Coordinates: 24°50′S 29°50′E

Sekhukhune
- District municipality
- Coat of arms

- Location in South Africa
- Country: South Africa
- Province: Limpopo
- Seat: Groblersdal
- Local municipalities: List: Fetakgomo/Tubatse; Ephraim Mogale; Elias Motsoaledi; Makhuduthamaga

Government
  - Type: Municipal council
  - Mayor: Cllr Maleke Mokganyetji

Area
  - Total: 13,528 km^{2} (5,223 sq mi)

Population (2011)
  - Total: 1,076,840
  - Density: 79.601/km^{2} (206.17/sq mi)

Racial makeup (2016)
  - Black African: 98.6%
  - Coloured: 0.2%
  - Indian/Asian: 0.1%
  - White: 1.1%

First languages (2011)
  - Pedi: 82.2%
  - Southern Ndebele: 4.4%
  - Zulu: 3.3%
  - Tsonga: 2.0%
  - Other: 8.1%
- Time zone: UTC+2 (SAST)
- Municipal code: DC47
- Website: sekhukhunedistrict.gov.za

The Sekhukhune District Municipality (Northern Sotho: Mmasepala wa Selete wa Sekhukhune) is one of the 5 districts of the Limpopo province of South Africa. The seat is Groblersdal. As of 2011, the majority of its 1,076,840 inhabitants spoke Sepedi. The district code is DC47.

This district is named after the natural region of Sekhukhuneland. Sekhukhuneland is named after the Pedi King Sekhukhune, who succeeded Sekwati in 1860 or 1861.

== Geography ==
=== Neighbours ===
Sekhukhune is surrounded by:

- Capricorn (DC35) to the north
- Mopani (DC33) to the east
- Ehlanzeni (DC32) to the south-east
- Nkangala (DC31) to the south
- Waterberg (DC36) to the north-west

=== Local municipalities ===
The district contains the following local municipalities:

Local municipality	Population	%	Dominant language
Fetakgomo/Tubatse	429,471	39.88%	Sepedi
Makhuduthamaga	262 906	27.18%	Sepedi
Elias Motsoaledi	220 738	22.82%	Sepedi
Ephraim Mogale	121 331	12.55%	Sepedi

== Demographics ==
The following statistics are from the 2001 census.

Language	Population	%
Sepedi	806 209	83.36%
Ndebele	42 450	4.39%
Zulu	26 758	2.77%
Swati	22 028	2.28%
Tswana	22 003	2.28%
Tsonga	19 373	2.00%
Sotho	12 815	1.33%
Afrikaans	7 956	0.82%
Xhosa	2 191	0.23%
English	2 165	0.22%
Venda	1 665	0.17%
Other	1 568	0.16%

=== Gender ===
Gender	Population	%
Female	536 715	55.50%
Male	430 411	44.50%

=== Ethnic group ===
Ethnic group	Population	%
Black African	958 578	99.12%
White	7 358	0.76%
Coloured	715	0.07%
Indian/Asian	475	0.05%

=== Age ===
Age	Population	%
000 - 004	116 031	12.00%
005 - 009	137 472	14.21%
010 - 014	144 079	14.90%
015 - 019	134 067	13.86%
020 - 024	84 482	8.74%
025 - 029	58 621	6.06%
030 - 034	46 464	4.80%
035 - 039	44 473	4.60%
040 - 044	36 946	3.82%
045 - 049	33 255	3.44%
050 - 054	28 931	2.99%
055 - 059	21 971	2.27%
060 - 064	21 959	2.27%
065 - 069	17 382	1.80%
070 - 074	17 411	1.80%
075 - 079	9 079	0.94%
080 - 084	8 508	0.88%
085 - 089	3 181	0.33%
090 - 094	1 728	0.18%
095 - 099	712	0.07%
100 plus	374	0.04%

== Politics ==
=== Election results ===
Election results for Sekhukhune in the South African general election, 2004.

- Population 18 and over: 484 867 [50.13% of total population]
- Total votes: 318 986 [32.98% of total population]
- Voting % estimate: 65.79% votes as a % of population 18 and over

Party	Votes	%
African National Congress	294 824	92.43%
Democratic Alliance	6 701	2.10%
United Democratic Movement	4 855	1.52%
Pan African Congress	3 650	1.14%
African Christian Democratic Party	2 279	0.71%
Azanian People's Organisation	2 022	0.63%
Freedom Front Plus	949	0.30%
New National Party	833	0.26%
Inkhata Freedom Party	521	0.16%
Independent Democrats	320	0.10%
United Christian Democratic Party	295	0.09%
EMSA	261	0.08%
NA	252	0.08%
SOPA	250	0.08%
PJC	223	0.07%
CDP	174	0.05%
UF	166	0.05%
TOP	152	0.05%
KISS	103	0.03%
NLP	85	0.03%
Minority Front	71	0.02%
Total	318 986	100.00%

2016 Local Election results for Sekhukhune District Municipality

African National Congress: 169 604 ||68.63%

Economic Freedom Fighters:48 228 ||19.51%

Democratic Alliance:13 368 ||5.41%

Pan African Congress :1 322 ||0.53%

Azanian People's Organisation:2 103 ||0.65%

Freedom Front Plus :1 097 ||0.44%

== See also ==
- Municipal Demarcation Board
