= Limpopo (National Assembly of South Africa constituency) =

- Constituency for the National Assembly of South Africa
- Location of Limpopo within South Africa
- Province: Limpopo
- Population: 5,852,553 (2020)
- Electorate: 2,608,460 (2019)

Current constituency
- Created: 1994
- Seats: List: 19 (2009–present); 21 (2004–2009); 20 (–2004)
- Members of the National Assembly: List: John Bilankulu (ANC); Kate Bilankulu (ANC); Steve Chabane (ANC); Masefako Dikgale (ANC); Marshall Dlamini (EFF); Thomas Gumbu (ANC); Pinky Kekana (ANC); Marubini Lubengo (ANC); Jerome Maake (ANC); Dikeledi Magadzi (ANC); Mikateko Mahlaule (ANC); Nhlagongwe Mahlo (ANC); Julius Malema (EFF; Boitumelo Maluleke (ANC); Omphile Maotwe (EFF; Cassel Mathale (ANC); Raesibe Moatshe (ANC); Ronald Moroatshehla (ANC); Ciliesta Motsepe (EFF; Faith Muthambi (ANC); Khumbudzo Ntshavheni (ANC); Carol Phiri (ANC); Mirriam Ramadwa (ANC); Albert Seabi (ANC); Machwene Semenya (ANC); Thembi Siweya (ANC); Sinawo Tambo (EFF; Désirée van der Walt (DA)

Limpopo is one of the nine multi-member constituencies of the National Assembly of South Africa, the lower house of the Parliament of South Africa, the national legislature of South Africa. The constituency was established as Northern Transvaal in 1994 when the National Assembly was established by the Interim Constitution following the end of Apartheid. It was renamed Northern Province in 1999 and Limpopo in 2004. It is conterminous with the province of Limpopo. The constituency currently elects 19 of the 400 members of the National Assembly using the closed party-list proportional representation electoral system. At the 2019 general election it had 2,608,460 registered electors.

== Electoral system ==
Limpopo State currently elects 19 of the 400 members of the National Assembly using the closed party-list proportional representation electoral system. Constituency seats are allocated using the largest remainder method with a Droop quota.

== Election results ==
=== Summary ===
Election	Pan Africanist Congress PAC			United Democratic Movement UDM			African National Congress ANC			Democratic Alliance DA/DP			New National Party NNP/NP			African Christian Democratic Party ACDP			Inkatha Freedom Party IFP			Economic Freedom Fighters EFF			Freedom Front Plus VF+/VFFF/VV-FF		
Election	Votes	%	Seats	Votes	%	Seats	Votes	%	Seats	Votes	%	Seats	Votes	%	Seats	Votes	%	Seats	Votes	%	Seats	Votes	%	Seats	Votes	%	Seats
2019	3,134	0.21%	0	1,483	0.10%	0	1,163,091	77.00%	15	81,066	5.37%	1				5,241	0.35%	0	706	0.05%	0	198,439	13.14%	3	24,042	1.59%	0
2014	3,949	0.26%	0	4,340	0.28%	0	1,202,905	78.97%	16	100,562	6.60%	1				6,306	0.41%	0	844	0.06%	0	156,488	10.27%	2	10,269	0.67%	0
2009	7,352	0.48%	0	5,109	0.33%	0	1,319,659	85.27%	17	57,418	3.71%	1				9,853	0.64%	0	927	0.06%	0				8,374	0.54%	0
2004	15,776	0.95%	0	27,512	1.66%	0	1,487,168	89.72%	20	63,236	3.81%	1	7,865	0.47%	0	20,340	1.23%	0	2,923	0.18%	0				8,655	0.52%	0
1999	20,070	1.21%	0	42,643	2.57%	1	1,483,199	89.30%	19	28,116	1.69%	0	28,559	1.72%	0	18,151	1.09%	0	5,389	0.32%	0				8,835	0.53%	0
1994	20,295	1.06%					1,780,177	92.73%		3,402	0.18%		69,870	3.64%		5,042	0.26%		2,938	0.15%					29,000	1.51%	

=== Detailed ===
==== 2024 ====
Results of the regional ballot for Limpopo in the 2024 general election held on 29 May 2024:

Party/Candidate	Votes	%	Seats	+/–
African National Congress	1,038,446	73.38	16	+1
Economic Freedom Fighters	197,992	13.99	3	0
Democratic Alliance	84,161	5.95	1	0
Freedom Front Plus	16,145	1.14	0	0
uMkhonto weSizwe	12,295	0.87	0	New
United Africans Transformation	11,764	0.83	0	New
ActionSA	9,444	0.67	0	New
African Christian Democratic Party	4,806	0.34	0	0
Action Alliance Development Party	4,600	0.33	0	New
Build One South Africa	4,507	0.32	0	New
Pan Africanist Congress of Azania	3,075	0.22	0	0
Azanian People's Organisation	2,932	0.21	0	0
African People's Convention	2,787	0.20	0	0
Patriotic Alliance	2,527	0.18	0	0
Rise Mzansi	2,118	0.15	0	New
Congress of the People	2,042	0.14	0	0
Able Leadership	1,951	0.14	0	New
Economic Liberators Forum South Africa	1,800	0.13	0	New
Blessings Ramoba (independent)	1,574	0.11	0	New
Forum for Service Delivery	1,429	0.10	0	0
African Transformation Movement	1,206	0.09	0	0
United Democratic Movement	950	0.07	0	0
Alliance of Citizens for Change	919	0.06	0	New
Inkatha Freedom Party	902	0.06	0	0
All Citizens Party	686	0.05	0	New
South African Rainbow Alliance	670	0.05	0	New
United Independent Movement	600	0.04	0	New
Lovemore N'dou (independent)	522	0.04	0	New
Citizans	364	0.03	0	New
Good	302	0.02	0	0
Ntakadzeni Phathela (independent)	273	0.02	0	New
Africa Restoration Alliance	256	0.02	0	New
Al Jama-ah	243	0.02	0	0
Organic Humanity Movement	237	0.02	0	New
Africa Africans Reclaim	201	0.01	0	New
Sizwe Ummah Nation	138	0.01	0	New
Free Democrats	128	0.01	0	0
People's Movement For Change	124	0.01	0	0
Total	1,415,116	100.00	20	+1
Valid votes	1,415,116	99.02		
Invalid/blank votes	13,957	0.98		
Total votes	1,429,073	100.00		
Registered voters/turnout	2,779,657	51.41		

The following candidates were elected.

Name	Party
Joyce Bila	ANC
Kate Bilankulu	ANC
Steve Chabane	ANC
Masefako Dikgale	ANC
Lencel Komane	EFF
Livhuwani Ligaraba	ANC
Moyagabo Makgato	ANC
Lilian Managa	EFF
Stanley Mathabatha	ANC
Mogodu Moela	ANC
Nandi Ndalane	ANC
Joe Phaahla	ANC
Carol Phiri	ANC
Maakgalake Pholwane	ANC
Stanley Ramaila	ANC
Albert Seabi	ANC
Seaparo Sekoati	ANC
Donald Selamolela	ANC
Mandla Shikwambana	EFF
Beyers Smit	DA

==== 2019 ====
Results of the national ballot for Limpopo in the 2019 general election held on 8 May 2019:

Party	Votes	%	Seats	+/–
African National Congress	1,163,091	77.00	15	–1
Economic Freedom Fighters	198,439	13.14	3	+1
Democratic Alliance	81,066	5.37	1	0
Freedom Front Plus	24,042	1.59	0	0
African Christian Democratic Party	5,241	0.35	0	0
African People's Convention	4,403	0.29	0	0
African Independent Congress	3,999	0.26	0	0
Congress of the People	3,233	0.21	0	0
Pan Africanist Congress of Azania	3,134	0.21	0	0
African Transformation Movement	2,839	0.19	0	New
Azanian People's Organisation	2,215	0.15	0	0
South African Maintenance and Estate Beneficiaries Association	1,809	0.12	0	New
African Security Congress	1,745	0.12	0	New
Agang South Africa	1,607	0.11	0	0
Afrikan Alliance of Social Democrats	1,592	0.11	0	New
United Democratic Movement	1,483	0.10	0	0
Socialist Revolutionary Workers Party	1,266	0.08	0	New
International Revelation Congress	982	0.07	0	New
Inkatha Freedom Party	706	0.05	0	0
Economic Emancipation Forum	647	0.04	0	New
African Covenant	584	0.04	0	New
Forum for Service Delivery	559	0.04	0	New
Better Residents Association	500	0.03	0	0
Black First Land First	479	0.03	0	New
Good	459	0.03	0	New
African Renaissance Unity Party	393	0.03	0	New
Al Jama-ah	331	0.02	0	0
Front National	320	0.02	0	0
Power of Africans Unity	298	0.02	0	New
Capitalist Party of South Africa	250	0.02	0	New
Women Forward	247	0.02	0	0
African Congress of Democrats	236	0.02	0	New
Democratic Liberal Congress	227	0.02	0	New
Land Party	211	0.01	0	New
African Content Movement	206	0.01	0	New
Alliance for Transformation for All	193	0.01	0	New
African Democratic Change	184	0.01	0	New
National Freedom Party	183	0.01	0	0
Christian Political Movement	182	0.01	0	New
South African National Congress of Traditional Authorities	159	0.01	0	New
Free Democrats	148	0.01	0	New
Compatriots of South Africa	145	0.01	0	New
People's Revolutionary Movement	124	0.01	0	New
National People's Front	96	0.01	0	New
Patriotic Alliance	95	0.01	0	0
National People's Ambassadors	84	0.01	0	New
Minority Front	71	0.00	0	0
Independent Civic Organisation of South Africa	65	0.00	0	–
Total	1,510,568	100.00	19	–
Valid votes	1,510,568	98.68		
Invalid/blank votes	20,269	1.32		
Total votes	1,530,837	100.00		
Registered voters/turnout	2,608,460	58.69		

The following candidates were elected: John Bilankulu (ANC), Kate Bilankulu (ANC), Steve Chabane (ANC), Masefako Dikgale (ANC), Marshall Dlamini (EFF), Thomas Gumbu (ANC), Marubini Lubengo (ANC), Jerome Maake (ANC), Nhlagongwe Mahlo (ANC), Joyce Maluleke (ANC), Boy Mamabolo (ANC), Raesibe Moatshe (ANC), Fana Mokoena (EFF), Tebogo Mokwele (EFF), Ronald Moroatshehla (ANC), Carol Phiri (ANC), Mirriam Ramadwa (ANC), Albert Seabi (ANC) and Désirée van der Walt (DA).

==== 2014 ====
Results of the 2014 general election held on 7 May 2014:

Party		Votes	%	Seats
African National Congress	ANC	1,202,905	78.97%	16
Economic Freedom Fighters	EFF	156,488	10.27%	2
Democratic Alliance	DA	100,562	6.60%	1
Congress of the People	COPE	12,478	0.82%	0
Freedom Front Plus	VF+	10,269	0.67%	0
African Independent Congress	AIC	6,611	0.43%	0
African Christian Democratic Party	ACDP	6,306	0.41%	0
Agang South Africa	AGANG SA	4,841	0.32%	0
United Democratic Movement	UDM	4,340	0.28%	0
African People's Convention	APC	4,044	0.27%	0
Pan Africanist Congress of Azania	PAC	3,949	0.26%	0
Azanian People's Organisation	AZAPO	3,692	0.24%	0
Workers and Socialist Party	WASP	1,065	0.07%	0
United Christian Democratic Party	UCDP	845	0.06%	0
Inkatha Freedom Party	IFP	844	0.06%	0
National Freedom Party	NFP	596	0.04%	0
Bushbuckridge Residents Association	BRA	490	0.03%	0
Patriotic Alliance	PA	365	0.02%	0
Al Jama-ah		362	0.02%	0
Front National	FN	336	0.02%	0
Ubuntu Party	UBUNTU	294	0.02%	0
Pan Africanist Movement	PAM	264	0.02%	0
First Nation Liberation Alliance	FINLA	207	0.01%	0
Keep It Straight and Simple Party	KISS	201	0.01%	0
Kingdom Governance Movement	KGM	193	0.01%	0
Minority Front	MF	176	0.01%	0
Independent Civic Organisation of South Africa	ICOSA	175	0.01%	0
United Congress	UNICO	146	0.01%	0
Peoples Alliance	PAL	125	0.01%	0
Valid Votes		1,523,169	100.00%	19
Rejected Votes		20,817	1.35%	
Total Polled		1,543,986	63.32%	
Registered Electors		2,438,280		

The following candidates were elected: Kate Bilankulu (ANC), Polly Boshielo (ANC), Pinky Kekana (ANC), Jerome Maake (ANC), Livhuhani Mabija (ANC), Moloko Stanford Armour Maila (ANC), Zondi Silence Makhubele (ANC), Thomas Makondo (ANC), Elizabeth Koena Mmanoko Masehela (ANC), Reneiloe Mashabela (EFF), Dudu Hellen Mathebe (ANC), Motswaledi Hezekiel Matlala (ANC), Choloane David Matsepe (DA), Madipoane Refiloe Moremadi Mothapo (ANC), Malusi Stanley Motimele (ANC), Thilivhali Elphus Mulaudz (EFF), Elleck Nchabeleng (ANC) and Rembuluwani Moses Tseli (ANC).

==== 2009 ====
Results of the 2009 general election held on 22 April 2009:

Party		Votes	%	Seats
African National Congress	ANC	1,319,659	85.27%	17
Congress of the People	COPE	111,651	7.21%	1
Democratic Alliance	DA	57,418	3.71%	1
African Christian Democratic Party	ACDP	9,853	0.64%	0
Freedom Front Plus	VF+	8,374	0.54%	0
Pan Africanist Congress of Azania	PAC	7,352	0.48%	0
Azanian People's Organisation	AZAPO	5,697	0.37%	0
United Democratic Movement	UDM	5,109	0.33%	0
African People's Convention	APC	4,754	0.31%	0
New Vision Party	NVP	4,313	0.28%	0
Movement Democratic Party	MDP	2,260	0.15%	0
United Independent Front	UIF	1,597	0.10%	0
Independent Democrats	ID	1,423	0.09%	0
Great Kongress of South Africa	GKSA	1,416	0.09%	0
United Christian Democratic Party	UCDP	1,080	0.07%	0
Inkatha Freedom Party	IFP	927	0.06%	0
Alliance of Free Democrats	AFD	902	0.06%	0
Women Forward	WF	822	0.05%	0
National Democratic Convention	NADECO	556	0.04%	0
Al Jama-ah		486	0.03%	0
South African Democratic Congress	SADECO	426	0.03%	0
Christian Democratic Alliance	CDA	363	0.02%	0
A Party		331	0.02%	0
Minority Front	MF	328	0.02%	0
Pan Africanist Movement	PAM	283	0.02%	0
Keep It Straight and Simple Party	KISS	256	0.02%	0
Valid Votes		1,547,636	100.00%	19
Rejected Votes		22,956	1.46%	
Total Polled		1,570,592	69.62%	
Registered Electors		2,256,073		

The following candidates were elected: Dalitha Fiki Boshigo (ANC), Nelson Diale (ANC), Tshenuwani Farisani (ANC), Jerome Maake (ANC), Catherine Mabuza (ANC), Willie Madisha (COPE), Zondi Silence Makhubele (ANC), Modjadji Sarah Mangena (ANC), Agnes Mashishi (ANC), Dudu Hellen Mathebe (ANC), Piet Mathebe (ANC), Nomvula Mathibela (ANC), Divili Wilson Mavunda (ANC), Malusi Stanley Motimele (ANC), Faith Muthambi (ANC), Elleck Nchabeleng (ANC), Mamagana Malose Anna Nyama (ANC), Maropeng Elizabeth Pilusa-Mosoane (ANC) and Désirée van der Walt (DA).

==== 2004 ====
Results of the 2004 general election held on 14 April 2004:

Party		Votes	%	Seats
African National Congress	ANC	1,487,168	89.72%	20
Democratic Alliance	DA	63,236	3.81%	1
United Democratic Movement	UDM	27,512	1.66%	0
African Christian Democratic Party	ACDP	20,340	1.23%	0
Pan Africanist Congress of Azania	PAC	15,776	0.95%	0
Freedom Front Plus	VF+	8,655	0.52%	0
Azanian People's Organisation	AZAPO	8,603	0.52%	0
New National Party	NNP	7,865	0.47%	0
Independent Democrats	ID	3,204	0.19%	0
Inkatha Freedom Party	IFP	2,923	0.18%	0
United Christian Democratic Party	UCDP	2,375	0.14%	0
National Action	NA	1,967	0.12%	0
Socialist Party of Azania	SOPA	1,313	0.08%	0
Employment Movement for South Africa	EMSA	1,311	0.08%	0
Peace and Justice Congress	PJC	1,229	0.07%	0
Christian Democratic Party	CDP	1,020	0.06%	0
United Front	UF	872	0.05%	0
The Organisation Party	TOP	862	0.05%	0
Keep It Straight and Simple Party	KISS	515	0.03%	0
New Labour Party		445	0.03%	0
Minority Front	MF	405	0.02%	0
Valid Votes		1,657,596	100.00%	21
Rejected Votes		29,161	1.73%	
Total Polled		1,686,757	77.09%	
Registered Electors		2,187,912		

The following candidates were elected: Richard Baloyi (ANC), Nelson Diale (ANC), Tshiwela Lishivha (ANC), Joyce Mabudafhasi (ANC), M. J. Mahlangu (ANC), Shoahlane John Maja (ANC), Tlokwe Maserumule (ANC), Puleng Mashangoane (ANC), Refilwe Mashigo (ANC), Nomvula Mathibela (ANC), Motswaledi Hezekiel Matlala (ANC), Lameck Mokoena (ANC), Arthur Moloto (ANC), Kgoloko Morwamoche (ANC), Lydia Ngwenya (ANC), Constance Nkuna (ANC), Tinyiko Nwamitwa-Shilubana (ANC), George Phadagi (ANC), John Phala (ANC), Jack Tolo (ANC) and Désirée van der Walt (DA).

==== 1999 ====
Results of the 1999 general election held on 2 June 1999:

Party		Votes	%	Seats
African National Congress	ANC	1,483,199	89.30%	19
United Democratic Movement	UDM	42,643	2.57%	1
New National Party	NNP	28,559	1.72%	0
Democratic Party	DP	28,116	1.69%	0
Pan Africanist Congress of Azania	PAC	20,070	1.21%	0
African Christian Democratic Party	ACDP	18,151	1.09%	0
Freedom Front	VFFF	8,835	0.53%	0
Azanian People's Organisation	AZAPO	8,121	0.49%	0
Federal Alliance	FA	6,198	0.37%	0
Afrikaner Eenheidsbeweging	AEB	6,095	0.37%	0
Inkatha Freedom Party	IFP	5,389	0.32%	0
United Christian Democratic Party	UCDP	1,684	0.10%	0
Socialist Party of Azania	SOPA	1,285	0.08%	0
Abolition of Income Tax and Usury Party	AITUP	1,281	0.08%	0
Minority Front	MF	653	0.04%	0
Government by the People Green Party	GPGP	570	0.03%	0
Valid Votes		1,660,849	100.00%	20
Rejected Votes		30,760	1.82%	
Total Polled		1,691,609	91.55%	
Registered Electors		1,847,766		

==== 1994 ====
Results of the national ballot for the Northern Province in the 1994 general election held between 26 and 29 April 1994:

Party	Votes	%	Seats
African National Congress	1,780,177	92.73	19
National Party	69,870	3.64	1
Freedom Front	29,000	1.51	0
Pan Africanist Congress of Azania	20,295	1.06	0
African Christian Democratic Party	5,042	0.26	0
Democratic Party	3,402	0.18	0
African Moderates Congress Party	3,168	0.17	0
Inkatha Freedom Party	2,938	0.15	0
Ximoko Progressive Party	1,354	0.07	0
Dikwankwetla Party of South Africa	722	0.04	0
Sport Organisation for Collective Contributions and Equal Rights	666	0.03	0
Minority Front	662	0.03	0
African Democratic Movement	597	0.03	0
Africa Muslim Party	437	0.02	0
Keep It Straight and Simple Party	365	0.02	0
Federal Party	310	0.02	0
Women's Rights Peace Party	273	0.01	0
Workers' List Party	259	0.01	0
Luso-South African Party	253	0.01	0
Total	1,919,790	100.00	20
Valid votes	1,919,790	99.07	
Invalid/blank votes	17,964	0.93	
Total votes	1,937,754	100.00	
