= Puleng =

Puleng is a given name and surname. Notable people with the name include:

- Puleng LenkaBula, South African academic and university administrator
- Puleng Mabe, known as Pule Mabe (born 1980), South African politician
- Puleng Mashangoane, South African politician
- N.S. Puleng, writer in the Northern Sotho language
