= List of committees of the Parliament of South Africa =

Committees of the Parliament of South Africa

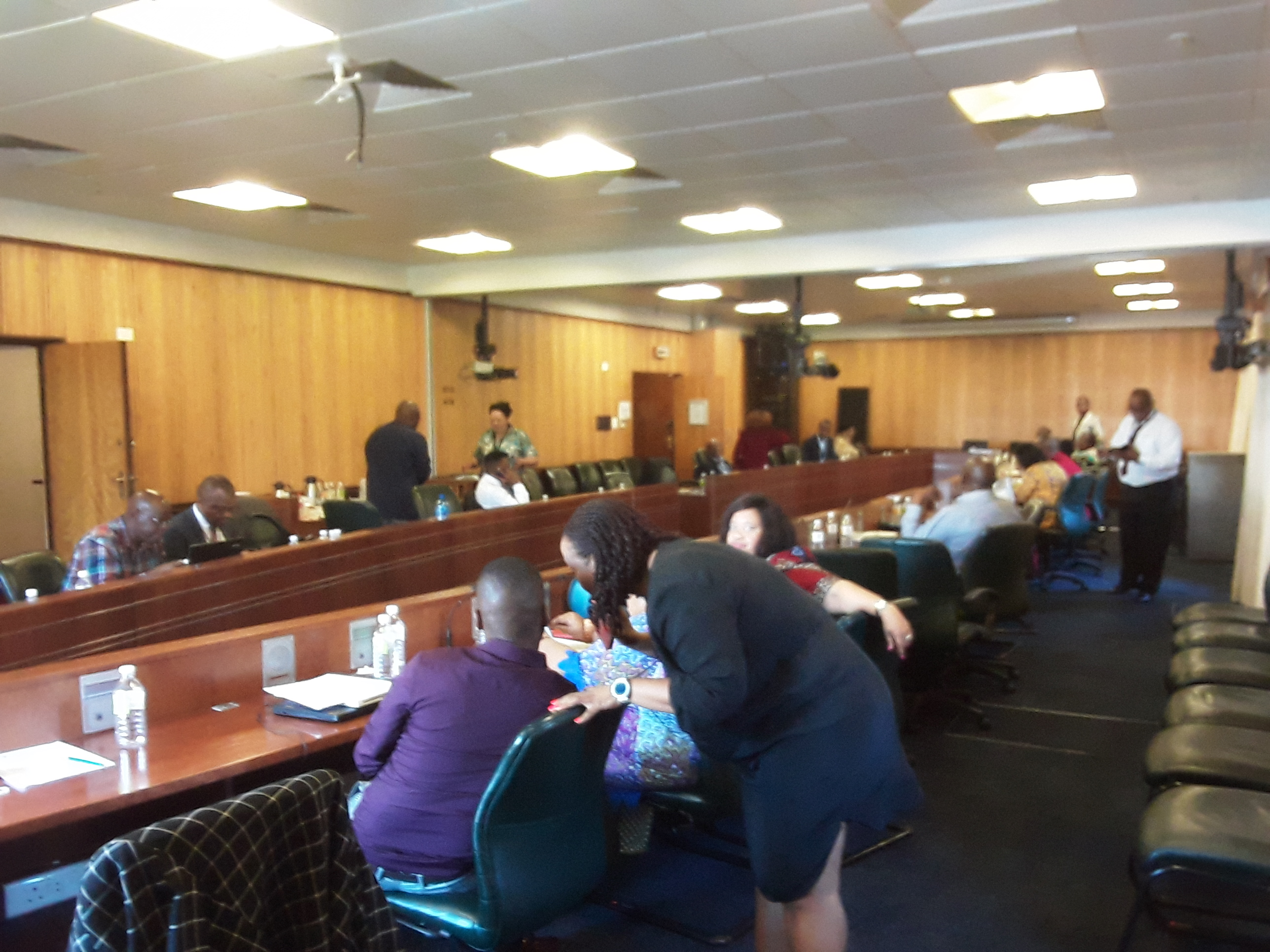
Meeting of the Portfolio Committee on Cooperative Governance and Traditional Affairs in 2019

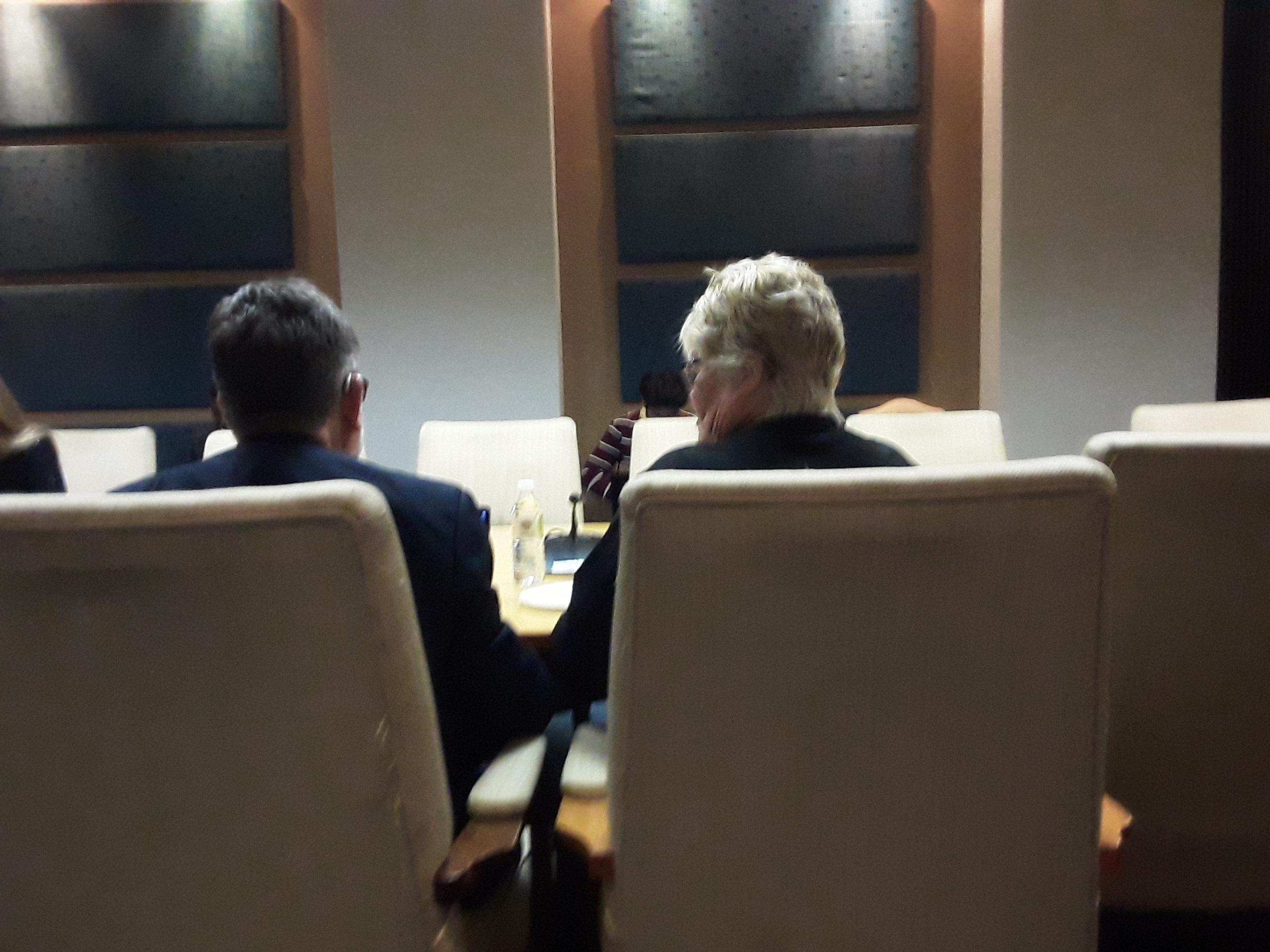
The backs of DA MPs Glynnis Breytenbach and James Selfe in the Portfolio Committee on Justice and Correctional Services in November 2019

The committees of the Parliament of South Africa are appointed to oversee the work of government and to process legislation in domains relevant to their designated portfolio. They are composed of Members of Parliament from either parliamentary chamber. Portfolio committees and most standing committees are peopled by Members of the National Assembly, while select committees comprise Permanent Delegates to the National Council of Provinces; these shadow the work of a particular government department or group of departments. Parliament may also establish joint committees, with members from both houses, and either chamber, alone or jointly, may establish ad hoc committees that operate for a shorter timeframe under a narrower mandate.

Although committees are largely regulated in terms of the Rules of Parliament, the basic framework for their operation derives from Chapter Four of the Constitution of South Africa. The Constitution provides for committees' powers to summon any persons or institutions to provide evidence, for their obligation to provide for public participation in committee activities, and for members' freedom of speech and parliamentary privilege during committee proceedings. In terms of the Constitution, Parliament may not exclude the public or the media from any committee sittings "unless it is reasonable and justifiable to do so in an open and democratic society".

Parliamentary political parties are represented in committees in proportions that are generally representative of their strength in Parliament. Because committee chairpersons are elected by and from among the members of each committee, the majority party in Parliament has the most influence in selecting chairpersons.

== National Assembly ==
=== Portfolio committees ===
The portfolio committees of the National Assembly deal with the examining of bills, departmental budget votes, and are responsible for oversight of the work their respective department does. As of 2024, the current portfolio committees and the chairs of each committee are as follows:

Portfolio committees
Committee	Chair		Responsibility
Committee	Name	Since	Responsibility
Portfolio Committee on Agriculture	Dina Pule	2024	Department of Agriculture
Portfolio Committee on Basic Education	Joy Maimela	2024	Department of Basic Education and statutory entities
Portfolio Committee on Communications and Digital Technologies	Khusela Sangoni	2024	Department of Communications and Digital Technologies and statutory entities
Portfolio Committee on Cooperative Governance and Public Administration	Zweli Mkhize	2024	Department of Cooperative Governance and Traditional Affairs and statutory entities
Portfolio Committee on Correctional Services	Anthea Ramolobeng	2024	Department of Correctional Services
Portfolio Committee on Defence and Military Veterans	Molefi Legoete	2024	Department of Defence and Military Veterans and statutory entities
Portfolio Committee on Employment and Labour	Boyce Makhosonke Maneli	2024	Department of Employment and Labour and associated entities
Portfolio Committee on Electricity and Energy	Queenie Mvana	2024	Department of Energy
Portfolio Committee on Environment, Forestry and Fisheries	Nqabisa Gantsho	2024	Department of Environment, Forestry and Fisheries and associated entities
Portfolio Committee on Health	Sibongiseni Dhlomo	2024	Department of Health and related entities
Portfolio Committee on Higher Education	Tebogo Letsie	2024	Department of Higher Education and Training and related entities
Portfolio Committee on Home Affairs	Steve Chabane	2021	Department of Home Affairs and related entities
Portfolio Committee on Human Settlements	Albert Mammoga Seabi	2024	Department of Human Settlements and related entities
Portfolio Committee on International Relations and Cooperation	Supra Mahumapelo	2021	Department of International Relations and Cooperation and related entities
Portfolio Committee on Justice and Constitutional Development	Xola Nqola	2024	Department of Justice and Constitutional Development and related entities
Portfolio Committee on Land Reform and Rural Development	Albert Mncwango	2024	Department of Rural Development and Land Reform
Portfolio Committee on Mineral and Petroleum Resources	Mikateko Mahlaule	2024	Department of Mineral Resources and Energy and related entities
Portfolio Committee on Police	Ian Cameron	2024	Department of Police and related entities
Portfolio Committee on Public Service and Administration	Jan de Villiers	2024	Department of Public Service and Administration
Portfolio Committee on Planning, Monitoring, and Evaluation	Teliswa Mgweba	2024	Department of Performance Monitoring and Evaluation
Portfolio Committee on Public Works and Infrastructure	Carol Phiri	2024	Department of Public Works and Infrastructure and associated entities
Portfolio Committee on Science, Technology, and Innovation	Tsakani Goodness Shiviti	2024	Department of Science and Innovation
Portfolio Committee on Small Business Development	Masefako Dikgale	2024	Department of Small Business Development and related entities
Portfolio Committee on Social Development	Bridget Masango	2024	Department of Social Development and related entities
Portfolio Committee on Sports, Arts and Culture	Joe McGluwa	2024	Department of Sports, Arts and Culture and related entities
Portfolio Committee on Tourism	Lungi Gcabashe	2024	Department of Tourism and related entities
Portfolio Committee on Trade and Industry	Mzwandile Masina	2024	Department of Trade and Industry and related entities
Portfolio Committee on Transport	Donald Selamolela	2024	Department of Transport and related entities
Portfolio Committee on Water and Sanitation	Leon Basson	2024	Department of Water and Sanitation and related entities
Portfolio Committee on Women, Youth and Persons with Disabilities	Lindelwa Dunjwa	2024	Department of Women, Youth and Persons with Disabilities and related entities

=== Standing committees ===
Standing committees
Committee	Chair	
Committee	Name	Since
Standing Committee on Appropriations	Mmusi Maimane	2024
Standing Committee on Auditor-General	Wouter Wessels	2024
Standing Committee on Finance	Joe Maswanganyi	2019
Standing Committee on Public Accounts	Songezo Zibi	2024

== National Council of Provinces ==
=== Select committees ===
Select committees are made up of Permanent Delegates to the National Council of Provinces. Since the National Council of Provinces, is much smaller than the National Assembly, select committees oversee the work of more than one department. As of 2024, the current select committees and chairs of each committee are as follows:

Select committees
Committee	Chair		Responsibility
Committee	Name	Since	Responsibility
Select Committee on Appropriations	Tidimalo Legwase	2024	
Select Committee on Agriculture, Land Reform, and Mineral Resources	Mpho Modise	2024	
Select Committee on Cooperative Governance and Public Administration	Mxolisi Kaunda	2024	
Select Committee on Economic Development and Trade	Sonja Boshoff	2024	
Select Committee on Education, Sciences and Creative Industries	Makhi Feni	2024	
Select Committee on Finance	Sanny Ndhlov	2024	National Treasury
Select Committee on Public Petitions and Executive Undertakings	Ofentse Mokae	2024	
Select Committee on Public Infrastructure and Ministries in Presidency	Frederik Badenhorst	2024	
Select Committee on Security and Justice	Jane Mananiso	2024	Department of Police, Department of Justice and Correctional Services, Department of Defence and Military Veterans, Department of Home Affairs and Department of International Relations and Cooperation
Select Committee on Social Services	Desery Fienies	2024	

== Joint committees ==
=== Joint committees ===
A joint committee consists of members of Parliament from both the National Assembly and the National Council of Provinces.

Joint committee
Committee	Chairs		Responsibility
Committee	Name	Since	Responsibility
Joint Committee on Ethics and Members Interest	Lydia Moshodi; Bheki Nkosi	2019	Ethical conduct of MPs and their financial disclosures

=== Joint standing committees ===
Joint standing committees
Committee	Chair	
Committee	Name	Since
Joint Standing Committee on Financial Management of Parliament	Peace Mabe; Dikeledi Mahlangu	2019
Joint Standing Committee on Defence	Elleck Nchabeleng; Cyril Xaba	2019
Joint Standing Committee on Intelligence	Jerome Maake	2019

== See also ==
- List of Commissions of Inquiry in South Africa
- Committee for Section 194 Enquiry
