= Philip Schalkwyk =

South African military officer politician

Member of the National Assembly
- In office June 1999 – April 2004
- Constituency: Gauteng

Personal details
- Born: 20 August 1931 (age 94)
- Citizenship: South Africa
- Party: Democratic Alliance; Democratic Party

Military service
- Allegiance: South African Defence Force
- Rank: Brigadier-General

Philippus Johannes Schalkwyk (born 20 August 1931) is a retired South African military officer and politician. He was a brigadier-general in the South African Defence Force and later represented the Democratic Party (DP) in the National Assembly from 1999 to 2004. In the assembly, he served the Gauteng constituency and was a member of the Joint Standing Committee on Intelligence.

== Life and career ==
Schalkwyk was born on 20 August 1931. He entered politics after retiring from military service; he was a brigadier-general in the South African Defence Force. In the 1999 general election, he was elected to represent the DP in the National Assembly, serving the Gauteng constituency. He served a single term in his seat, leaving after the 2004 general election.

During the term, Schalkwyk served as the DP's spokesman on defence, and, with Hendrik Schmidt, was also a defence spokesman for the Democratic Alliance, the multi-party opposition coalition founded by the DP in 2000. In late May 2001, he was additionally nominated to serve as the DP's sole representative on the Joint Standing Committee on Intelligence, replacing Richard Pillay.
