= Nomvula Mathibela =

South African politician (born 1941)

Member of the National Assembly
- In office 23 April 2004 – 6 May 2014
- Constituency: Limpopo

Personal details
- Born: 13 September 1941 (age 84)
- Citizenship: South Africa
- Party: African National Congress

Nomvula Frieda Mathibela (born 13 September 1941) is a retired South African politician from Limpopo. She represented the African National Congress (ANC) in the National Assembly from 2004 to 2014.

Mathibela was elected to the National Assembly in the 2004 general election, in which she was ranked fourth on the ANC's party list for Limpopo. She was re-elected to her seat in 2009. During her second term, she was a member of the Portfolio Committee on Energy and manned the ANC's constituency office in Vleischboom.
