= John Phala =

South African politician and activist (1924–2009)

Member of the National Assembly
- In office June 1999 – May 2009
- Constituency: Limpopo

Member of the Limpopo Provincial Legislature
- In office May 1994 – June 1999

Personal details
- Born: Mahwidi John Phala; 24 February 1924 Sekhukhuneland, Northern Transvaal; Union of South Africa
- Died: 30 July 2009 (aged 85)
- Party: African National Congress
- Other political affiliations: South African Communist Party
- Nickname: Mokgomana

Mahwidi John "Mokgomana" Phala (24 February 1924 – 30 July 2009) was a South African politician and former anti-apartheid activist from Limpopo. He represented the African National Congress (ANC) in the Limpopo Provincial Legislature from 1994 to 1999 and in the National Assembly from 1999 to 2009.

Phala joined the ANC during apartheid in 1953 and rose to prominence during the 1958 Sekhukhuneland revolt. An early recruit to Umkhonto we Sizwe (MK) in 1961, he was convicted of terrorism in 1977 and sentenced to 30 years in prison for his role in an MK sabotage operation. He served his sentence on Robben Island until he was released during the negotiations to end apartheid.

== Early life and activism ==
Born on 24 February 1924, Phala was Bapedi from Sekhukhuneland. After apartheid was formally introduced in 1948, he joined the ANC and South African Communist Party; soon after joining the ANC in 1953, he became a fieldworker during Freedom Charter campaign, and in 1955 he attended the Congress of the People, which adopted the charter.

During the same period, in 1954, Phala was a founding member of Sebatakgomo, a political organisation that was formed in Johannesburg by migrant workers from Sekhukhuneland and that went on to play a central role in the 1958 Sekhukhuneland revolt. In the early 1960s, Phala succeeded Lucas Kghapola as chairman of Fetakgomo, the successor organisation to Sebatkgomo.

Phala was an early recruit to MK in 1961 and later led his own underground MK unit in the Johannesburg area, operating in areas such as Moletsane and Naledi. He was arrested for his role in an MK sabotage operation – the attempted derailment of a train on the railway between Johannesburg and Vereeniging – and in November 1977, a court in Springs sentenced him to thirty years in prison for terrorism and unlawful possession of weapons.

He was well behaved and someone who loved people. But should he find out that you were a hypocrite and that you did not commit your life to the party and to the struggle, he would leave you. He would say: 'That is your problem, we are continuing. You will see where your life will end up, you hypocrite!'

— Nelson Diale on Phala's character

He was imprisoned on Robben Island, where he shared a cell with future deputy president Kgalema Motlanthe. Motlanthe admired him as a mentor and later recalled that Phala was "our clock on the island": in the absence of alarm clocks, Phala roused younger prisoners in the morning if they wanted to wake up early for reading or study. Phala did not serve his full sentence but was released during the negotiations to end apartheid.

== Legislative career: 1994–2009 ==
In South Africa's first post-apartheid elections in 1994, Phala was elected to an ANC seat in the Limpopo Provincial Legislature. In the next general election in 1999, he was elected to the National Assembly, representing the Limpopo constituency; he served two terms in his seat, gaining re-election in 2004. James Selfe of the opposition Democratic Alliance, who served with Phala in the Portfolio Committee on Correctional Services, later recalled that, though he was by then in his 80s, Phala insisted on participating in all of the committee's oversight tours and attending all of its meetings, even when he was unwell.

He retired after the April 2009 general election and died on 30 July 2009.
