= Cecil Burgess (politician) =

South African politician

Member of the National Assembly
- In office 23 April 2004 – 6 May 2014

Personal details
- Citizenship: South Africa
- Party: African National Congress (since 2005); Independent Democrats (until 2005)
- Education: University of South Africa

Cecil Valentine Burgess is a South African politician and lawyer who served in the National Assembly from 2004 to 2014. He represented the Independent Democrats (ID) until September 2005, when he crossed the floor to the African National Congress (ANC).

Burgess chaired Parliament's Joint Standing Committee on Intelligence from 2008 to 2014. When he left the National Assembly after the 2014 general election, the ANC nominated him for appointment as Inspector-General of Intelligence. The nomination was fiercely resisted by opposition parties and his nomination was abandoned in 2016 after it repeatedly failed to garner the required two-thirds majority in the house.

== Early career ==
Burgess has a bachelor's degree from the University of South Africa and is a practicing attorney. According to the Daily Maverick, he was "closely associated" with the Pan Africanist Congress (PAC) for many years before joining the ID, a party formed in 2003 by former PAC member Patricia de Lille. In the ID he was seen as de Lille's "right-hand man", both "lawyer and confidant".

== Legislative career: 2004–2014 ==
=== First term: 2004–2009 ===
Burgess was elected to the National Assembly in the 2004 general election on the Western Cape list for the ID. On 14 September 2005, during the floor-crossing window of that month, Burgess left the ID to join the ruling ANC.

At that time, the ANC was confronting the aftermath of the Travelgate scandal, which saw several private travel agencies liquidated after they colluded with parliamentarians to defraud Parliament. According to the Mail & Guardian, Burgess was at the forefront of the ANC's legal response to the civil claims lodged against ANC members during the ensuing liquidation inquiries, and thereby earned "the undying gratitude" of ANC representatives and officials. In October 2008, the ANC nominated him to serve as chairperson of the Joint Standing Committee on Intelligence after the incumbent, Siyabonga Cwele, was appointed Minister of Intelligence.

=== Second term: 2009–2014 ===
Burgess was re-elected to the National Assembly in the 2009 general election, listed on the ANC's national party list. Shortly afterwards, in May 2009, the National Assembly voted to deploy him as one of its six representatives on the Judicial Service Commission. The Mail & Guardian said that Burgess was at that point "definitely the flavour of the month" in the ANC.

In addition to retaining the intelligence chairmanship, which he held throughout the legislative term, from 2010 Burgess chaired the ad hoc committee that was established to respond to public concerns about the widely unpopular Protection of State Information Bill (commonly known as the Secrecy Bill). He also served on the ad hoc committee that exonerated President Jacob Zuma of wrongdoing in the Nkandla saga.

== Inspector-General of Intelligence nomination: 2015–2016 ==
The ANC did not nominate Burgess for re-election in the 2014 general election, and the media immediately speculated that he was in line for an ambassadorial post or a position at the State Security Agency. Instead he emerged as the ANC's favoured candidate for appointment as Inspector-General of Intelligence, an office with an important role in civilian oversight of state intelligence functions. At the culmination of the interview process, the Joint Standing Committee on Intelligence formally recommended Burgess for appointment, but the ratification of the appointment required a two-thirds majority in the National Assembly. Most opposition parties were strongly opposed to Burgess's appointment, primarily because of his role in exonerating Zuma, defending the Secrecy Bill, and otherwise promoting "the government line".

On two occasions, in June and November 2015, the ANC scheduled votes on Burgess's appointment and then withdrew the motion because they could not count on the requisite majority. In March 2016, the ANC announced that it would refer the matter back to the intelligence committee for reconsideration: it said that it had no doubts that Burgess was a suitable candidate but had decided that further consensus-building would be appropriate. In November 2016, the committee finalised a new shortlist which did not include Burgess.
