= Piet Mathebe =

South African politician and traditional leader (1961–2020)

Member of the National Assembly
- In office 9 May 1994 – 1 October 2012

Personal details
- Born: Piet Mohlamme Mathebe; 16 January 1961
- Died: 24 August 2020 (aged 59) Middelburg, Mpumalanga
- Citizenship: South Africa
- Party: African National Congress
- Education: University of the North

Piet Mohlamme Mathebe (16 January 1961 – 24 August 2020) was a South African politician and the traditional leader of Limpopo's Bantwane tribe. Known in the later capacity as Mohlamme III, he led the tribal authority from 1992 until his death in 2020.

Mathebe was also renowned as a supporter of the African National Congress (ANC), which he joined during apartheid. He was recruited into an underground cell of Umkhonto we Sizwe (MK) in the Northern Transvaal in 1987 and, after receiving military training abroad, he was commander of his own cell from 1987.

After the end of apartheid, he represented the ANC in the National Assembly from 1994 to 2012. Thereafter he served as South African High Commissioner to Zambia from 2012 to 2014 and then as a special adviser to Limpopo Premier Stan Mathabatha from 2014 until his death.

== Early life and activism ==
Mathebe was born on 16 January 1961. He became involved in youth activism against apartheid as a teenager.

In 1987, during the last year of his undergraduate studies at the University of the North, Mathebe joined the underground of the ANC, which at the time was banned by the apartheid government. He received informal military training from Jerome Maake and became a member of Maake's MK unit, which operated in the Moutse area of the Northern Transvaal. At the Truth and Reconciliation Commission, Mathebe sought and received amnesty for his participation in several of the unit's operations in 1987, including the murder of two policemen in an ambush, the planting of a bomb at Kwaggafontein police station, and the planting of a limpet mine at a magistrate's court in Moutse.

At the end of 1987, Mathebe left South Africa to receive formal MK military training in Angola. He returned to South Africa in 1989 and became the commander of a new MK unit named after trade unionist Peter Nchabeleng. In 1992, he took office as traditional leader (kgoshi) of the Bantwane, a Sotho-Tswana tribe in the Northern Transvaal. The tribal authority is based in present-day Elias Motsoaledi Local Municipality on the Limpopo–Mpumalanga border.

== Post-apartheid political career ==
In South Africa's first post-apartheid elections in 1994, Mathebe was elected to represent the ANC in the National Assembly. He served three-and-a-half terms in his seat before he retired on 1 October 2012. He was a backbencher in the assembly and represented the Mpumalanga constituency until 2009, when he was elected to represent the Limpopo constituency.

Mathebe left Parliament in 2012 in order to join the diplomatic service, and he served as South African High Commissioner to Zambia from 2012 to 2014. Upon his return to South Africa in 2014, Mathebe was appointed as special advisor to Stan Mathabatha, the Premier of Limpopo. He advised Mathabatha on traditional affairs and economic development. He remained in the latter position until his death in 2020.

== Personal life and death ==
Mathebe had several children. He died on 24 August 2020 in a hospital in Middelburg, Mpumalanga, following a short illness.

President Cyril Ramaphosa granted him a special official provincial funeral, which was held in Moutse and addressed by Premier Mathabatha.
