= Shoahlane Maja =

South African politician

Member of the National Assembly
- In office 23 April 2004 – May 2009
- Constituency: Limpopo

Personal details
- Born: Shoahlane John Maja; 3 July 1941 (age 84)
- Citizenship: South Africa
- Party: African National Congress

Shoahlane John Maja (born 3 July 1941) is a South African politician who represented the Limpopo constituency in the National Assembly from 2004 to 2009. A member of the African National Congress, he was elected in the 2004 general election. He did not stand for re-election in 2009.
