= Nhlagongwe Mahlo =

South African politician

Member of the National Assembly of South Africa
- In office 22 May 2019 – 28 May 2024
- Constituency: Limpopo

Personal details
- Born: Nhlagongwe Patricia Mahlo
- Party: African National Congress

Nhlagongwe Patricia Mahlo is a South African politician who served as a member of the National Assembly of South Africa representing the African National Congress from 2019 until 2024. Mahlo had previously served as a member of the Limpopo Provincial Legislature and as the Capricorn District Municipality's Member of the Mayoral Committee (MMC) for Strategic Executive Management Services.

== Political career ==
A member of the African National Congress, Mahlo was a member of the Limpopo Provincial Legislature. She was whip of the 25 ANC constituency offices in the province and was later elected Chairperson of the legislature's Agriculture portfolio committee. She was not on the ANC's provincial candidate list for the May 7, 2014 election and left the provincial legislature.

In July 2014 Mahlo was appointed as the member of the mayoral committee (MMC) responsible for Strategic Executive Management Services in the Capricorn District Municipality. She was not reappointed to the mayoral committee after the 2016 local elections. Mahlo then served as a PR councillor and as whip of the portfolio committee of community service. Mahlo served in multiple portfolios, including community services, sports, arts and culture, DEPMS, local economic development, and finance.

== Parliamentary career ==
Mahlo stood for the National Assembly in the 2019 national elections as a candidate on the ANC's list of National Assembly candidates from Limpopo. She was elected to the National Assembly. She was a member of the Joint Standing Committee on the Financial Management of Parliament and the Portfolio Committee on Agriculture, Land Reform and Rural Development.

Mahlo did not stand for reelection in 2024.
