= Refilwe Mashigo =

South African politician (born 1947)

Member of the National Assembly
- In office 23 April 2004 – 6 May 2014

Personal details
- Born: 7 October 1947 (age 78)
- Citizenship: South Africa
- Party: African National Congress

Refilwe Junior Mashigo (born 7 October 1947) is a retired South African politician who represented the African National Congress (ANC) in the National Assembly from 2004 to 2014. First elected in 2004, she represented the Limpopo constituency during her first term, but she was re-elected off the ANC's national party list in 2009.

During her second term, Mashigo served as the ANC's whip in the Standing Committee on Appropriations; she was also a member of the Standing Committee on Finance. She did not stand for re-election in 2014.
