= Danny Msiza =

South African politician

Provincial Treasurer of the Limpopo African National Congress
- In office September 2015 – June 2022
- Chairperson: Stan Mathabatha
- Preceded by: Thembi Nwendamutswu
- Succeeded by: Nakedi Sibanda-Kekana

Personal details
- Party: African National Congress

Danny Msiza is a South African politician and businessman who served as Provincial Treasurer of the African National Congress (ANC) in Limpopo between 2015 and 2022. Msiza, a long-standing ANC member and prominent community leader, is actively campaigning for the party for the upcoming 2024 general elections.

In addition to his role in the ANC, he is a successful entrepreneur with a diverse range of business interests, leading to extensive connections in the corporate world.

Some of his wealth comes from his shares in Nkulunge, a company that holds BEE shares in Cell C, valued at R7.5 million. Additionally, he has a stake in Marula Platinum, a part of the Implats group, worth R12.8 million. The Marula Platinum mine is located in Limpopo.

== Early life ==
Msiza was the inaugural president of the Transvaal's anti-apartheid Motetema Youth Congress in the 1980s. According to the ANC, he was recruited into the underground of Umkhonto we Sizwe in 1984, and he subsequently spent time in exile outside the country. He returned to South Africa in 1992, after the ANC had been unbanned, and subsequently was active in party structures in Sekhukhune in present-day Limpopo. After the end of apartheid, he became a businessman and had financial interests in sectors including mining, telecommunications, and construction.

== ANC Provincial Treasurer: 2015–2021 ==
=== Election ===
In September 2015, Msiza was elected as Provincial Treasurer of the ANC's Limpopo branch. He was elected at a special provincial general council held to fill the position after the former incumbent, Thembi Nwedamutswu, died. At the party's next provincial elective conference in June 2018, he was re-elected to a full four-year term in the position, beating Seaparo Sekoati with 848 votes to Sekoati's 688.

=== VBS Mutual Bank scandal ===
In October 2018, the South African Reserve Bank published the report of a forensic investigation it had commissioned into alleged fraud and corruption at VBS Mutual Bank, and Msiza was heavily implicated. According to the report, entitled The Great Bank Heist, Msiza was the "kingpin" in a commissions scam at VBS, under which various agents had received sizeable commissions in exchange for encouraging municipalities and other public sector entities to invest deposits at the bank, often in contravention of public finance management laws. Msiza's role was allegedly to use his political influence as ANC Provincial Treasurer to encourage municipal officials to approve these deposits. In addition, the National Prosecuting Authority later alleged that Msiza had played a central role in directing agents to channel their commissions to various third parties, and that he had himself received kickbacks. Msiza strongly denied the allegations, calling them "scandalous" and "baseless".

==== Suspension ====
After The Great Bank Heist was published, initiating a major public controversy, the ANC's internal Integrity Commission recommended that Msiza and Florence Radzilani, who was also implicated, should "step aside" from their party positions until their names had been cleared. On 11 December 2018, Msiza formally stepped aside, saying that he did not admit guilt but nonetheless accepted the Integrity Commission's decision. "Stepping aside" amounted effectively to voluntarily accepting a suspension from office.

In July 2020, the ANC's National Executive Committee recommended that Msiza and Radzilani should be reinstated in their party positions unless and until they faced criminal charges in connection with the VBS saga. According to News24, the proposal to reinstate them emanated from Stan Mathabatha, then the Premier of Limpopo and the Provincial Chairperson of the ANC in the province. On 8 September 2020, the Provincial Executive Committee of the Limpopo ANC announced that Msiza had officially returned to office as ANC Provincial Treasurer.

==== Criminal charges ====
On 11 August 2020, portions of The Great Bank Heist which made findings against Msiza were set aside by the Gauteng High Court on procedural grounds: the court found that the investigators had not given Msiza sufficient opportunity to respond to the allegations against him, in contradiction to the requirements of administrative justice. However, in March 2021, Msiza was arrested by the Hawks and formally indicted. He and his 13 co-accused faced charges of racketeering, theft, fraud and money laundering in the VBS saga. His first court appearance was on 12 March at Palm Ridge Magistrate's Court. His trial was due to begin in 2022.

==== Step-aside rule ====
Msiza's indictment coincided with divisions in the ANC about the implementation of the party's step-aside policy, and, unlike in 2018, Msiza resisted calls to step aside. The Mail & Guardian reported that Msiza effectively controlled the Limpopo ANC even after his arrest. In April 2021, the provincial party contracted external legal counsel, which advised the Provincial Executive Committee that it might be unlawful to compel Msiza to step aside. However, in August 2021, the ANC National Executive Committee unambiguously ordered the provincial party to implement the step-aside rule against Msiza, which entailed suspending him if he did not step aside voluntarily. Msiza agreed to step aside later the same week.

Although he was never reinstated as Provincial Treasurer, Msiza was expected to seek re-election to high party office when his term ended in June 2022: he emerged as a likely challenger to incumbent Provincial Secretary Soviet Lekganyane. However, in May 2022, the Provincial Executive Committee announced that the step-aside rule barred Msiza from contesting in party elections until his name was cleared. When the party's provincial elective congress was held in June 2022, Msiza was nonetheless nominated for the position; ANC Treasurer-General Paul Mashatile personally took to the podium to explain to delegates why Msiza was not eligible to run. The leadership corps elected at the conference was viewed as strongly allied to Msiza – as was Reuben Madadzhe, who ultimately won election to the secretariat – and, though excluded from party office, Msiza remained influential in ANC politics. In the aftermath of the June party conference, he publicly argued for the step-aside rule to be amended.

== Personal life ==
Msiza is married to Mmabogoshi Bellah Msiza.
