= Constance Nkuna =

South African politician

Member of the National Assembly
- In office April 2004 – May 2009
- Constituency: Limpopo

Delegate to the National Council of Provinces

Assembly Member for Limpopo
- In office June 1999 – April 2004

Personal details
- Born: 8 February 1955 (age 71)
- Citizenship: South Africa
- Party: African National Congress

Constance Nkuna (born 8 February 1955) is a South African politician from Limpopo. She represented the African National Congress (ANC) in Parliament from 1999 to 2009.

== Legislative career ==
Between 1999 and 2004, Nkuna was one of Limpopo's permanent delegates to the National Council of Provinces. In the 2004 general election, she was elected to an ANC seat in the Limpopo caucus of the National Assembly, where she served a single term. She did not stand for re-election in 2009.
