= Mamabolo Nwedamutswu =

South African politician and activist (born 1952)

Member of the National Assembly
- In office May 1994 – June 1999

Personal details
- Born: Mamabolo John Nwedamutswu; 17 April 1952 (age 74) GaMamabolo, Mankweng; Northern Transvaal, Union of South Africa
- Party: African National Congress
- Spouse: Thembi Nwedamutswu (died 2015)
- Nicknames: Philipos; Philip; Mumsy

Mamabolo John Nwedamutswu (born 17 April 1952) is a retired South African politician and former anti-apartheid activist. He joined the African National Congress (ANC) underground in the Northern Transvaal in 1969, and from 1979 to 1991 he lived in exile with the movement, serving as a political commissar for Umkhonto we Sizwe (MK) in Swaziland. After the end of apartheid, he represented the African National Congress (ANC) in the National Assembly from 1994 to 1999.

== Early life and education ==
Nwedamutswu was born on 17 April 1952. He is named after his birthplace, the village of GaMamabolo in Mankweng, but he grew up in Matangari in Vhembe, where his father owned a shop.

He became politically active while a high school student in Pietersburg, influenced by one of his teachers and by debates within his family about his sister's marriage to a policeman. Later, at boarding school, he was influenced by his Zairean teachers and by the school's black priests, who taught an African perspective on the history of the Christian church in South Africa.

== Anti-apartheid activism ==
In 1969, Nwedamutswu was recruited into the underground of the ANC, which at the time was banned in South Africa. Shortly afterwards, he organised a protest at his school, which led to his expulsion and to extensive police attention. Over the next few years, he remained a prominent figure in the Northern Transvaal structures of the ANC, reporting to Joe Gqabi, the ANC's representative in neighbouring Zimbabwe, and carrying out propaganda, recruitment, and political education activities. He was detained in 1976 during an attempt to leave the country via Botswana, but he left three years later, in 1979, after the Security Branch found him in possession of a banned book; he went into hiding in Soweto, where his aunt lived, until the ANC dispatched an escort to transport him across the border.

In exile with the ANC, Nwedamutswu was a political commissar for MK in Swaziland. His nom de guerre was Philip Mokoena, giving rise to the nickname Philipos. In 1987, while in Dar es Salaam, Tanzania on MK business, he was badly injured in a car accident, which damaged his memory. After the accident, he received medical treatment in the Soviet Union and then studied political science in the United Kingdom on a scholarship. He returned to South Africa in 1991 during the negotiations to end apartheid.

== Post-apartheid career ==
In South Africa's first post-apartheid elections in 1994, Nwedamutswu was elected to represent the ANC in the National Assembly. He served a single term in his seat, leaving after the 1999 general election. He later served as regional chairperson of the ANC's regional branch in Vhembe.

== Personal life ==
He was married to Thembi Nwedamutswu, whom he met while stationed in Swaziland; they had four children together. A prominent politician in Limpopo, Thembi died in January 2015.
