= Lindy Wilson =

South African politician

Lindy Wilson MPL

Member of the Limpopo Provincial Legislature
- Incumbent
- Assumed office 4 August 2023
- Preceded by: Désirée van der Walt

Provincial Leader of the Democratic Alliance in Limpopo
- Incumbent
- Assumed office 27 May 2023
- Deputy: Marie Helm
- Federal Leader: John Steenhuisen
- Preceded by: Jacques Smalle

Shadow Deputy Minister of Health
- In office 5 June 2019 – 31 July 2023
- Leader: John Steenhuisen; Mmusi Maimane
- Preceded by: Lungiswa James

Shadow Deputy Minister of Social Development
- In office 5 June 2014 – 5 June 2019
- Leader: Mmusi Maimane
- Preceded by: Emmah More
- Succeeded by: Thandi Mpambo-Sibhukwana

Member of the National Assembly of South Africa
- In office 21 May 2014 – 31 July 2023

Personal details
- Party: Democratic Alliance (2010–present)
- Spouse: Brian
- Children: 5

Evelyn "Lindy" Wilson is a South African politician who has served as the provincial leader of the Democratic Alliance in Limpopo since 2023. A former councillor for ward 20 in the Polokwane Local Municipality, Wilson was elected to the National Assembly of South Africa in 2014. She was then appointed Shadow Deputy Minister of Social Development. After the 2019 election, she became the Shadow Deputy Minister of Health. Wilson was sworn in as a member of the Limpopo Provincial Legislature in August 2023.

== Career ==
Wilson worked as an advertising manager at Northern Media Group before she started a catering and events management business and an advertising and marketing venture. She also served as the chairperson of the South African National Council on Alcoholism and Drug Dependence (Sanca) in Limpopo.

== Political career ==
In 2010, Wilson became the operations manager for the Democratic Alliance in the Mopani District. She stood as the DA candidate in a by-election in ward 20 in the Polokwane Local Municipality in February 2012 and won the seat off the African National Congress. Later that same year, she was elected provincial chairperson of the DA.

=== Parliamentary career ===
Wilson was selected to be the DA's provincial campaign manager for the 2014 general elections, which saw the party win over 95,000 votes in the province and three seats in the provincial legislature. She was elected to a DA seat in the National Assembly in the election. Having entered parliament, she was appointed to the Shadow Cabinet as Shadow Deputy Minister of Social Development.

At the DA's provincial conference held in 2017, Wilson was elected one of two deputy provincial chairpersons of the party. The following year, she was appointed head of the DA's Waterberg South constituency.

Wilson was re-elected to the National Assembly in the 2019 general election. Thereafter, she was appointed Shadow Deputy Minister of Health.

In April 2021, DA provincial leader Jacques Smalle was accused of turning a blind eye to allegations of Wilson abusing party funds. Wilson responded to the accusations by saying that it has been investigated and no charges were laid against her by the party.

Wilson successfully contested the position of provincial leader at the DA's provincial conference held on 27 May 2023, defeating the four other candidates for the position. She replaced Smalle, who, in turn, was elected provincial chairperson.

On 4 August 2023, Wilson was sworn in as a member of the Limpopo Provincial Legislature.

== Personal life ==
Wilson is married to Brian. They have five children together.
