= Thembi Nwedamutswu =

South African politician (1960–2015)

Member of the Limpopo Executive Council for Education
- In office 21 May 2014 – 9 January 2015
- Premier: Stan Mathabatha
- Preceded by: Dikeledi Magadzi
- Succeeded by: Ishmael Kgetjepe

Member of the Limpopo Provincial Legislature
- In office 21 May 2014 – 9 January 2015

Provincial Treasurer of the African National Congress in Limpopo
- In office February 2014 – 9 January 2015
- Chairperson: Stan Mathabatha
- Preceded by: Pinky Kekana
- Succeeded by: Danny Msiza

Personal details
- Born: Thembisile Ellen Mkhumane; 17 December 1960 Swaziland
- Died: 9 January 2015 (aged 54) Pretoria, Gauteng; South Africa
- Citizenship: South Africa
- Party: African National Congress
- Spouse: Mamabolo Nwedamutswu

Thembisile Ellen Nwedamutswu (née Mkhumane; 17 December 1960 – 9 January 2015) was a South African politician and civil servant who served as Limpopo's Member of the Executive Council for Education from May 2014 until her death in January 2015. She was first elected to the Limpopo Provincial Legislature in the 2014 general election, which took place shortly after she was elected Provincial Treasurer of the Limpopo branch of the African National Congress. Before the 2014 election, she was a chief executive officer of the Independent Development Trust for ten years, and she also formerly worked in national and provincial public administration.

== Early life and career ==
Nwedamutswu was born on 17 December 1960 in Swaziland. She was the fourth child of Gilbert and Ntoni Mkhumane, who were South Africans from Natal province. She was educated in Swaziland and also spent time in Mozambique and Tanzania, where she was involved in activities of the exiled African National Congress (ANC), including as a manager at the Solomon Mahlangu Freedom College. She returned to South Africa in 1991.

For two decades after the end of apartheid in 1994, she held various positions in public entities: she was director of human resource development at the Public Service Commission from 1995 to 1999, the head of the Mpumalanga Department of Social Development from 1999 to 2000, and the Deputy Director-General of the national Department of Social Development from 2000 to 2003. In November 2003, she was appointed chief executive officer of the Independent Development Trust, a national development agency.

== Political career ==
Nwedamutswu remained a member of the ANC and, at a party elective conference in February 2014, she was elected to a four-year term as Provincial Treasurer of the ANC's Limpopo branch, serving under newly elected Provincial Chairperson Stan Mathabatha. Later that year, she left the Independent Development Trust ahead of the 2014 general election, in which she was elected to the Limpopo Provincial Legislature, ranked 21st on the ANC's provincial party list. After the election, Mathabatha, in his capacity as Premier of Limpopo, appointed Nwendamutswu to the Limpopo Executive Council as Member of the Executive Council (MEC) for Education.

== Personal life and death ==
She was married to Mamabolo Nwedamutswu, whom she met when he joined Umkhonto weSizwe in exile in Swaziland. They had four children together – Manu, Mpile, Leko, and Aluwani – and grandchildren. On 9 January 2015, she died in hospital in Pretoria after a brief illness. Zweli Mkhize and national ministers Angie Motshekga and Edna Molewa were among those who spoke at her funeral.
