= Ronald Moroatshehla =

South African politician

Member of the National Assembly of South Africa
- In office 22 May 2019 – 28 May 2024
- Constituency: Limpopo

Personal details
- Born: Patamedi Ronald Moroatshehla
- Party: African National Congress
- Profession: Politician

Patamedi Ronald Moroatshehla is a South African politician who served as a Member of Parliament (MP) for the African National Congress. He was elected to parliament in 2019. He did not stand for reelection in 2024.

In the National Assembly of South Africa, Moroatshehla was a member of the Portfolio Committee on Basic Education and the Ad Hoc Committee to initiate and Introduce Legislation amending Section 25 of the Constitution.
