= Mogodu Moela =

South African politician (born 1987)

The Honourable Mogodu Moela

Member of the National Assembly

Assembly Member for Limpopo
- Incumbent
- Assumed office 14 June 2024

Personal details
- Born: 4 July 1987 (age 38)
- Party: African National Congress

Mogodu Samuel Moela (born 4 July 1987) is South African politician from Limpopo who has represented the African National Congress (ANC) in the National Assembly since June 2024. He was elected to his parliamentary seat in the May 2024 general election, ranked seventh on the ANC's party list in Limpopo, and sits on the Portfolio Committee on International Relations and Cooperation and Portfolio Committee on Correctional Services.
