= Jacques Smalle =

South African politician

The Honourable Jacques Smalle MP
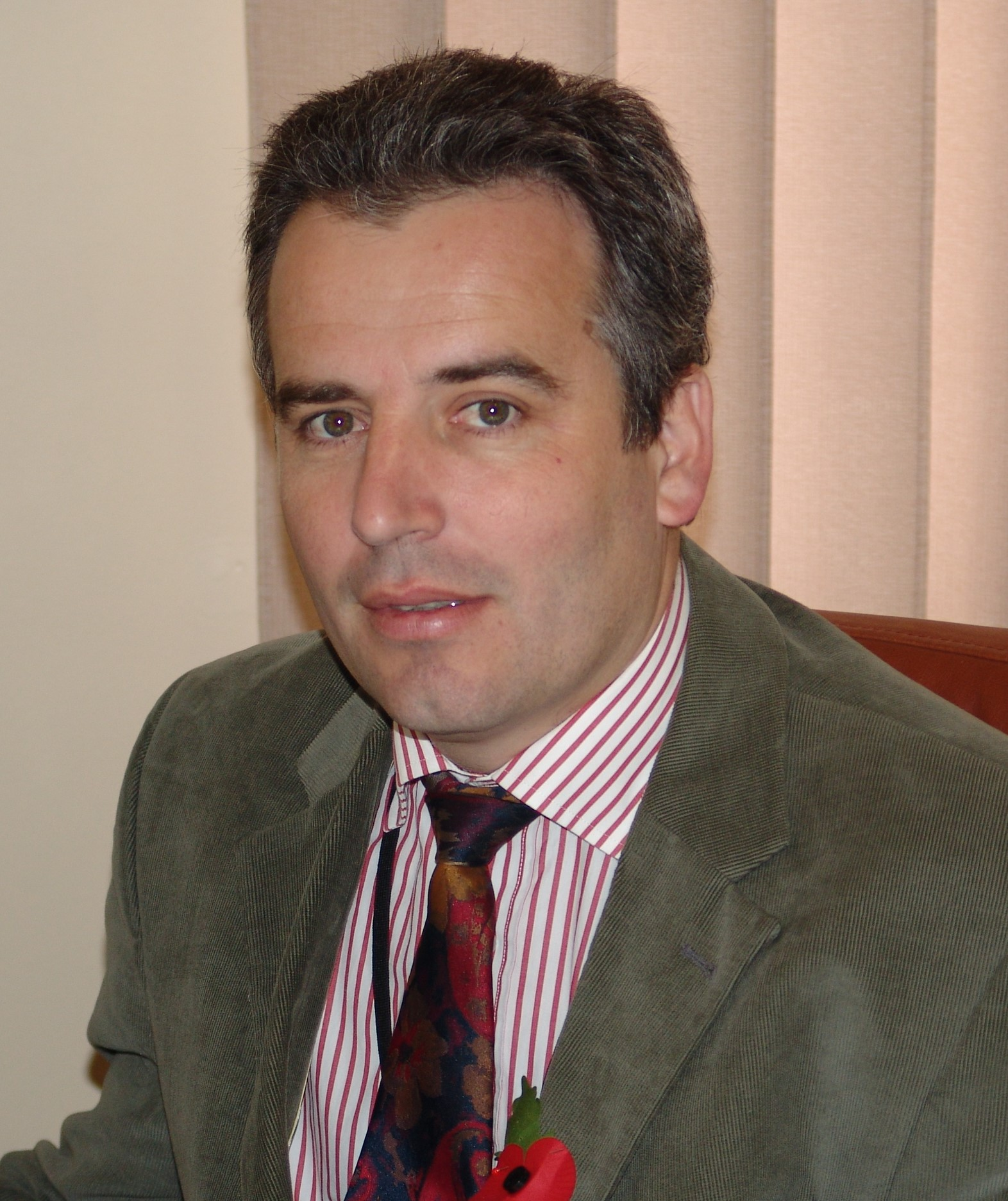

Provincial Chairperson of the Democratic Alliance
- Incumbent
- Assumed office 27 May 2023
- Preceded by: Geoffery Tshivumbo

Member of the National Assembly
- Incumbent
- Assumed office 10 May 2023
- In office 10 September 2010 – 6 May 2014

Deputy Federal Chairperson of the Democratic Alliance
- In office 1 November 2020 – 2 April 2023

Provincial Leader of the Democratic Alliance
- In office 9 June 2012 – 27 May 2023
- Preceded by: Désirée van der Walt
- Succeeded by: Lindy Wilson

Member of the Limpopo Provincial Legislature
- In office 21 May 2014 – 31 March 2023
- In office 6 May 2009 – September 2010

Personal details
- Born: 28 June 1970 (age 55) Louis Trichardt Memorial Hospital, Louis Trichardt, Transvaal, South Africa
- Party: Democratic Alliance
- Spouse: Heidi Smalle (divorced)
- Children: 2 (1 deceased)

Jacobus Frederik "Jacques" Smalle (born 28 June 1970) is a South African politician who has served as a Democratic Alliance Member of the National Assembly of South Africa since 2023 and previously from 2010 to 2014. Smalle served as a member of the Limpopo Provincial Legislature twice from 2009 until 2010 and again from 2014 until 2023. Smalle is currently the Democratic Alliance's Limpopo provincial chairperson. He had previously served as the party's Limpopo provincial leader and as deputy federal chairperson of the party. He was the DA's Limpopo Premier candidate for the 2019 election.

== Early life ==
Smalle was born on 28 June 1970 in the Louis Trichardt Memorial Hospital in the town of Louis Trichardt.

== Early political career ==
Smalle is a founding member of the Democratic Alliance. He was also an activist for vulnerable children in the Limpopo town of Oudtshoorn during the 1990s. In 2000, he was elected as an Oudtshoorn municipal councilor. In 2006, he was elected as a Makhado Local Municipality councilor and served as a councilor until his election to the Limpopo Provincial Legislature in May 2009.

== Parliamentary career ==
In September 2010, he took office as a Member of the National Assembly of South Africa. Parliamentary Leader of the Democratic Alliance Athol Trollip released a statement on 6 September 2010, in which he named Smalle as the new Shadow Deputy Minister of Arts and Culture. Smalle served in the position until newly-elected Parliamentary Leader of the Democratic Alliance Lindiwe Mazibuko appointed him to the position of Shadow Deputy Minister of Energy in February 2012.

In June 2012, Smalle unseated incumbent Provincial Leader Désirée van der Walt. He was declared the winner after four candidates were eliminated. National Leader of the Democratic Alliance Helen Zille urged delegates not to vote on the basis of their race.

== Return to the provincial legislature ==
In May 2014, Smalle returned to the Limpopo Provincial Legislature as leader of the Democratic Alliance caucus. He currently sits on the committees on Agriculture, Public Accounts, Rules and Ethics, and Education in the provincial legislature.

Smalle won re-election to a second term as Provincial Leader of the Limpopo Democratic Alliance in February 2015. In October 2017, he was re-elected for a third term as Provincial Leader.

On 15 September 2018, National Democratic Alliance Leader Mmusi Maimane announced Smalle as the party's Limpopo Premier candidate for the 2019 election.

In the 2019 election, the Democratic Alliance retained its position as the third-largest party in the provincial legislature, though the party did lose support to the Freedom Front Plus.

== Later political career ==
Smalle was elected as the third deputy federal chairperson of the DA in 2020. He served alongside Refiloe Nt'sekhe and Anton Bredell.

=== Suspension ===
In early-March 2021, a report by the Federal Legal Commission of the DA, which recommended that disciplinary steps be taken against Smalle for abusing party funds and fraud, was leaked two years after it was reportedly published. The DA leadership reportedly did not act on it when it was published The DA national leadership subsequently postponed its provincial elective conference and placed the party's provincial office under administration as it investigated the allegations against Smalle. Smalle was running for a fourth term as provincial leader against DA MP Solly Malatsi. Smalle has denied the allegations.

On 26 April 2021, Smalle was suspended from party activities by the Federal Executive (FedEx) of the DA for alleged tax fraud and abuse of party funds. He then faced a disciplinary hearing.

=== Reinstatement ===
Smalle was reinstated on 13 March 2023 following a lengthy internal party disciplinary process which found him not guilty of the five charges brought against him by the party. He continued serving as a Member of the Limpopo Legislature and as leader of the DA caucus until 31 March 2023 after which he resigned to become a Member of Parliament for the DA.

Smalle stood down as a deputy federal chairperson of the DA at the party's Federal Congress held from 1 to 2 April 2023.

Smalle was sworn in as a DA MP on 10 May 2023. On 10 May, the DA announced that Smalle was nominated for the position of provincial chairperson of the party ahead of the party's Limpopo conference. He was elected at the provincial conference on 27 May 2023, having defeated Désirée van der Walt.

== Personal life ==
He was married to Heidi Smalle; they had two children together, Pierre and Juan. Juan committed suicide on 28 January 2023 on his father's farm in Makhado.

Smalle speaks three languages: English, Afrikaans and TshiVenda.

Party political offices
Preceded by Désirée Van Der Walt	Provincial Leader of the Limpopo Democratic Alliance; 2012–present	Incumbent
Political offices
Preceded by David Ross	Shadow Deputy Minister of Energy; 2012–2014	Succeeded by Gordon Mackay
Preceded by Désirée Van Der Walt	Shadow Deputy Minister of Arts and Culture; 2010–2012	Succeeded by Ena van Schalkwyk
