= Ishmael Kgetjepe =

South African politician

Member of the Executive Council for Education
- In office May 2015 – May 2019
- Premier: Stan Mathabatha
- Preceded by: Thembisile Nwedamutswu
- Succeeded by: Polly Boshielo

Member of the Executive Council for Health
- In office May 2014 – May 2015
- Premier: Stan Mathabatha
- Preceded by: Dipuo Letsatsi-Duba
- Succeeded by: Phophi Ramathuba

Member of the Executive Council for Human Settlements
- In office July 2013 – May 2014
- Premier: Stan Mathabatha
- Preceded by: Clifford Motsepe
- Succeeded by: Makoma Makhurupetje

Personal details
- Citizenship: South Africa
- Party: African National Congress

Maaria Ishmael Kgetjepe is a South African politician who represented the African National Congress (ANC) in the Limpopo Executive Council between 2013 and 2019, most prominently as Member of the Executive Council (MEC) for Health from 2015 to 2019. He was also MEC for Education from 2014 to 2015 and MEC for Human Settlements from 2013 to 2014.

== Life and career ==
Kgetjepe attended Makgoka High School in Mankweng in Limpopo province. He was active in the Sekhukhune regional branch of the ANC and formerly served as a spokesperson for the ANC's provincial branch in Limpopo.

He was appointed to the Executive Council for the first time in July 2013, when Stan Mathabatha took office as Premier of Limpopo and announced a wide-ranging reshuffle in which Kgetjepe was named MEC for Human Settlements.

In the 2014 general election, Kgetjepe was re-elected to the Limpopo Provincial Legislature, ranked seventh on the ANC's provincial party list, and Mathabatha reappointed him to the Executive Council as MEC for Health.

On 27 May 2015, Mathabatha announced that Kgetjepe would be moved to the Education portfolio, where he filled a vacancy that had arisen after the death of Thembisile Nwedamutswu in January that year. He was MEC for Education until May 2019 and towards the end of his term was at the centre of a corruption scandal when City Press reported that he had received R1.05 million from a non-governmental organisation, Mvula Trust, which had received a tender from the national Department of Basic Education. According to an audit report leaked to the newspaper, he had received the money in eight tranches between September 2017 and June 2018. The Mvula Trust admitted that it had made payments to Kgetjepe at his request to fund his political activities in the ANC, but denied that the payments constituted a bribe or conflict of interest, pointing out that Kgetjepe had no influence over the adjudication of the bid, especially because he had taken office as an MEC after the tender was granted. Opposition parties nonetheless responded with hostility, with the Democratic Alliance calling for Mathabatha to fire Kgetjepe and the Economic Freedom Fighters laying criminal charges against him with the police.

After the 2019 general election, Kgetjepe did not return to the Executive Council or the provincial legislature.
