= Marubini Lubengo =

South African politician

Member of the National Assembly of South Africa
- In office 22 May 2019 – 28 May 2024
- Constituency: Limpopo

Personal details
- Party: African National Congress

Marubini Lourane Lubengo is a South African politician for the African National Congress who served as a member of the National Assembly of South Africa from 2019 until 2024. Lubengo had previously served in the Limpopo Provincial Legislature.

Lubengo served on the National Assembly's Portfolio Committee on Small Business Development and the Standing Committee on Public Accounts.
