= Paulina Makgato =

South African politician (born 1963)

The Honourable Paulina Makgato

Member of the National Assembly

Assembly Member for Limpopo
- Incumbent
- Assumed office 14 June 2024

Personal details
- Born: 1 December 1963 (age 62)
- Party: African National Congress

Moyagabo Paulina Makgato (born 1 December 1963) is South African politician from Limpopo who has represented the African National Congress (ANC) in the National Assembly since June 2024. She was formerly the mayor of Limpopo's Molemole Local Municipality between 2011 and 2016.

She was elected to her parliamentary seat in the May 2024 general election, ranked 16th on the ANC's party list in Limpopo, and sits on the Portfolio Committee on Social Development and Portfolio Committee on Sport, Arts and Culture.
