= Motswaledi Matlala =

South African politician

Member of the National Assembly
- In office 21 May 2014 – 7 May 2019
- Constituency: Limpopo
- In office 23 April 2004 – May 2009
- Constituency: Limpopo

Personal details
- Born: Motswaledi Hezekiel Matlala; 4 June 1964 (age 61)
- Citizenship: South Africa
- Party: African National Congress

Motswaledi Hezekiel Matlala (born 4 June 1964) is a South African politician from Limpopo. He represented the Limpopo constituency in the National Assembly for two non-consecutive terms from 2004 to 2009 and from 2014 to 2019. He is a member of the African National Congress (ANC).

== Legislative career ==
Matlala was elected to the National Assembly in the 2004 general election, ranked sixth on the ANC's regional party list for Limpopo. He served a single term in his seat: in the next general election in 2009, he stood for election to the Limpopo Provincial Legislature, but narrowly missed out on a seat.

He returned to the National Assembly at the 2014 general election, now ranked fourth on the Limpopo list. During the legislative term that followed, he served on the Portfolio Committee on Energy and the Portfolio Committee on Mineral Resources. During a committee meeting in November 2016, Matlala called for harsher punishment of illegal miners, including longer prison sentences and even moves to "seal the mines while they are down there".
