= Nakedi Sibanda-Kekana =

South African politician (born 1966)

Member of the Limpopo Executive Council for Agriculture and rural Development
- Incumbent
- Assumed office 20 June 2024
- Premier: Phophi Ramathuba
- Preceded by: Thabo Mokone

Member of the Limpopo Executive Council for Sports, Arts and Culture
- In office 6 October 2022 – 14 June 2024
- Premier: Stan Mathabatha
- Preceded by: Thandi Moraka
- Succeeded by: Jerry Maseko

Member of the Limpopo Provincial Legislature
- Incumbent
- Assumed office 22 May 2019

Provincial Treasurer of the ANC in Limpopo
- Incumbent
- Assumed office June 2022
- Chairperson: Stan Mathabatha
- Preceded by: Danny Msiza

Personal details
- Born: 16 January 1966 (age 60)
- Citizenship: South Africa
- Party: African National Congress

Nakedi Grace Sibanda-Kekana (born 16 January 1966) is a South African politician who is currently serving as Member of the Executive Council (MEC) for Agriculture and Rural Development in the Limpopo provincial government. She was previously the MEC for Sports, Arts and Culture, a position she was appointed to in October 2022, shortly after she was elected Provincial Treasurer of the Limpopo branch of her political party, the African National Congress (ANC). She was first elected as a Member of the Limpopo Provincial Legislature in the 2019 general election and before that was Mayor of Lepelle-Nkumpi Local Municipality from August 2016 until December 2018, when the ANC asked her to resign during the corruption scandal at VBS Mutual Bank.

== Career in local government ==
Sibanda-Kekana was formerly a councillor in the Lepelle-Nkumpi Local Municipality of Limpopo province's Capricorn District and she served as the municipal council's Speaker; she was installed in the Speaker's office by 2013 and remained there until the August 2016 local elections. Pursuant to the 2016 elections, she was re-elected to her council seat and was elected Mayor of Lepelle-Nkumpi. By the time of her election as mayor, Sibanda-Kekana also held senior office in the local ranks of her political party, the African National Congress (ANC), as Regional Treasurer of the Limpopo ANC's Peter Mokaba region; she was re-elected to another term in that position in July 2018.

In October 2018, Sibanda-Kekana was implicated in the corruption scandal at VBS Mutual Bank when it emerged, in the course of a South African Reserve Bank investigation, that Lepelle-Nkumpi municipality under Sibanda-Kekana had deposited over R150 million in the bank before its liquidation. The opposition Democratic Alliance (DA) called for her resignation, and in December 2018 she was one of several ANC mayors whom the party forced to resign because of their involvement in VBS deposits. In 2019 she was succeeded as mayor by Meriam Molala, though Molala's initial appointment was later declared invalid by the high court.

== Career in provincial government ==
After her resignation as mayor, Sibanda-Kekana remained ANC Regional Treasurer and in the 2019 general election she was elected as a Member of the Limpopo Provincial Legislature, ranked 24th on the ANC's party list. In December 2021, the ANC's Peter Mokaba region re-elected her once more as Regional Treasurer.

=== ANC Provincial Treasurer: 2022 ===
In early 2022, Sibanda-Kekana emerged as a strong candidate for election as Provincial Treasurer of the ANC's Limpopo branch. She ran on a slate aligned to the incumbent ANC Provincial Chairperson, Stan Mathabatha, who was running for re-election to a third term in his office. Her candidacy received the support of the leadership of her home Peter Mokaba region, although some local branches in the region preferred Donald Selamolela for the position. Her nomination was also controversial within the ANC's own Tripartite Alliance: the Limpopo branch of the South African Communist Party (SACP) argued that Sibanda-Kekana, and others on Mathabatha's slate who had been linked to the VBS scandal, "must not be voted into office" regardless of whether they had faced criminal charges in connection with the scandal.

When the ANC's provincial elective conference opened in June 2022, Donald Selamolela declined a nomination to stand against Sibanda-Kekana, leaving her to contest the position against Faith Chauke. She received 786 votes against Chauke's 375 and was elected to the position, as were Mathabatha and the rest of his slate.

=== Executive Council: 2022–present ===
On 6 October 2022, Mathabatha, in his capacity as Premier of Limpopo, announced a reshuffle of the Limpopo Executive Council which was understood to be linked to the outcomes of the ANC's party conference in June. Sibanda-Kekana was appointed Member of the Executive Council (MEC) for Sports, Arts and Culture; she replaced Thandi Moraka, who had failed to gain re-election to the ANC Provincial Executive Committee at the party conference. Also appointed to the Executive Council in the same reshuffle was Florence Radzilani, another former mayor who had resigned during the VBS scandal. Radzilani and Sibanda-Kekana's appointments were heavily criticised by the opposition DA, Economic Freedom Fighters, ActionSA, and Azanian People’s Organisation (AZAPO); in November, AZAPO organised a march to the Premier's office, calling for Mathabatha to remove Radzilani and Sibanda-Kekana. In response to this criticism, Mathabatha pointed out that Radzilani and Sibanda-Kekana had not faced criminal charges and that their appointment was therefore compliant with the ANC's step-aside guidelines for party members implicated in corruption.

Sibanda-Kekana became the MEC for Agriculture and Rural Development following Phophi Ramathuba's election to the office of premier in the aftermath of the 2024 general election.
