= Jerry Maseko =

South African politician (born 1966)

Jerry Maseko MPL

Member of the Limpopo Executive Council for Sports, Arts and Culture
- In office 20 June 2024 – 2 September 2026
- Premier: Phophi Ramathuba
- Preceded by: Nakedi Sibanda-Kekana

Member of the Limpopo Provincial Legislature
- Incumbent
- Assumed office 22 May 2019

Personal details
- Born: 21 July 1966 (age 60)
- Citizenship: South Africa
- Party: African National Congress

Funani Jerry Maseko (born 21 July 1966) is a South African politician who has represented the African National Congress (ANC) in the Limpopo Provincial Legislature since 2019. He was elected to his seat in the 2019 general election, ranked 11th on the ANC's party list.

Maseko was born on 21 July 1966. He was active in anti-apartheid student politics while training as a teacher in the 1980s, and in the 1990s he ascended the local and regional ranks of the ANC Youth League in the province. He represented the ANC as a local councillor in Limpopo from 1995 to 2011, first in the Eastern Tubatse–Ohrigstad transitional council from 1995 to 2000 and then in the Sekhukhune District Municipality in 2000 to 2011, ultimately serving as a Member of the Mayoral Committee and Chief Whip in Sekhukhune.

He was also active in the Sekhukhune regional branch of the ANC, and he was elected as its Regional Secretary in 2014 and re-elected in 2017. In 2020, he was widely expected to challenge the incumbent, Stanley Ramaila, for the chairmanship of the regional party, but when the next regional elective conference was held in December 2021 he did not stand and he was succeeded as Regional Secretary by Tala Mathope.

Following his re-election to the Provincial Legislature in the 2024 general election, Maseko was appointed to the Limpopo Executive Council with the responsibility for the Arts, Sports and Culture portfolio.
