= Clifford Motsepe =

South African politician

Member of the Limpopo Executive Council for Cooperative Governance, Human Settlements and Traditional Affairs
- In office 13 March 2012 – 19 July 2013
- Premier: Cassel Mathale
- Preceded by: Soviet Lekganyane
- Succeeded by: Ishmael Kgetjepe (for Human Settlements)

Personal details
- Born: 25 May 1974 (age 52)
- Citizenship: South Africa
- Party: African National Congress
- Children: Barati Motsepe
- Education: University of Limpopo

Nkomotana Clifford Motsepe (born 25 May 1974) is a South African politician and public servant who served in the Limpopo Executive Council from March 2012 to July 2013. He was Member of the Executive Council (MEC) for Cooperative Governance, Human Settlements and Traditional Affairs under Premier Cassel Mathale. He is a member of the African National Congress (ANC), an alumnus of the ANC Youth League, and a former member of the Provincial Executive Committee of the ANC's Limpopo branch.

== Early life and education ==
Motsepe was born on 25 May 1974 and his home language is Northern Sotho. He received both a BProc and an LLB from the University of Limpopo, in 1996 and 1998 respectively.

== Career ==
Motsepe spent his early career working in public administration. Most proximately, he was municipal manager at Limpopo's Waterberg District Municipality from 2007 to 2009 and then a senior manager in the office of the Premier of Limpopo – then occupied by Cassel Mathale – from 2009 onwards.

At the same time, Motsepe was active in the African National Congress (ANC). He was a member of the National Executive Committee of the ANC Youth League and was known to be a close personal and political ally of Julius Malema, who at the time was the president of the league. He was also appointed to the board of the South African Broadcasting Corporation. By late 2011, Motsepe had aged out of the Youth League but at that year's provincial party conference, he was elected to a four-year term on the Provincial Executive Committee of the Limpopo branch of the mainstream ANC; of the 25 candidates elected, he was the most popular, receiving 597 votes among the 1,072 ballots cast.

Less than three months after the election, on 13 March 2012, Premier Mathale announced that he had appointed Motsepe to the Limpopo Executive Council as Member of the Executive Council (MEC) for Cooperative Governance, Human Settlements and Traditional Affairs. He succeeded Soviet Lekganyane, who had stepped down in order to assume the full-time role of ANC Provincial Secretary. However, Motsepe held the office for less than two years: on 18 July 2013, Mathale was replaced by Stan Mathabatha, who, the following day, reconfigured Motsepe's portfolio and replaced him with Ishmael Kgetjepe. Motsepe did not stand for re-election to the Limpopo Provincial Legislature in the 2014 general election.

== Personal life ==
Motsepe was married to Matshelane Irene Motsepe. In October 2013, she laid assault charges against him in connection with an alleged incident of domestic violence; Motsepe appeared in court three times before the charge was withdrawn in March 2014.
