= Kgoloko Morwamoche =

South African politician and Pedi traditional leader (1953–2014)

Member of the National Assembly
- In office June 1999 – May 2009
- Constituency: Limpopo

Personal details
- Born: Kgoloko Walter Morwamoche; 5 December 1953
- Died: June 2014 (aged 60)
- Citizenship: South Africa
- Party: African National Congress

Chief Kgoloko Walter Morwamoche (5 December 1953 – June 2014) was a South African politician and Pedi traditional leader. He represented the African National Congress (ANC) in the National Assembly from 1999 to 2009, serving the Limpopo constituency.

== Life and career ==
Morwamoche was born on 5 December 1953. He inherited the chieftaincy of a Pedi clan, the Kgoloko of Madibong in present-day Makhuduthamaga, Limpopo.

He was elected to two consecutive terms in the National Assembly in 1999 and 2004. He was a member of the ANC's Limpopo caucus and served in the Portfolio Committee on Home Affairs.

Morwamoche died in June 2014 and was succeeded as traditional leader by his first-born son.
