= Richard Pillay =

South African politician

Member of the National Assembly
- In office June 1999 – April 2004
- Constituency: Gauteng

Personal details
- Born: 19 November 1957 (age 68)
- Citizenship: South Africa
- Party: New National Party (since March 2003)
- Other political affiliations: Democratic Party; African National Congress

Sigamoney Richard Pillay (born 19 November 1957) is a South African politician who served in the National Assembly from 1999 to 2004, representing the Gauteng constituency. He was a member of the Democratic Party until April 2003, when he crossed the floor to the New National Party. He is a former member of Umkhonto we Sizwe and a former activist in the Unemployed Masses of South Africa.

== Early life and career ==
Pillay was born on 19 November 1957. During apartheid, he was a member of the anti-apartheid African National Congress (ANC) and its military wing, Umkhonto we Sizwe (MK). According to Pillay, MK tasked him with infiltrating the South African Police in the 1980s. However, MK's internal security department alleged that Pillay was working as a double agent for the apartheid security forces, and he was held in detention in MK prison camps – first in Angola and later in Uganda – from 1986 to 1989. He later publicly alleged that ANC personnel had tortured him while he was in detention and he testified to this effect in a court case brought by another MK member in the 1990s.

In the post-apartheid era, Pillay rose to prominence as a patron of and policy adviser to the Unemployed Masses of South Africa (Umsa), a job-seekers' organisation. He began volunteering for Umsa in 1995, while he was working for a company that dealt with electricity problems affecting the unemployed. Ahead of the 1999 general election, Umsa allied itself to the Democratic Party (DP), and Pillay personally was credited with bringing hundreds of supporters to the party. Pillay himself joined the DP in 1998.

== Legislative career: 1999–2004 ==
In the 1999 election, Pillay stood as a candidate for the DP, ranked fifth on the party's regional list in the Gauteng constituency. He denied that his nomination was the result of his position in Umsa, saying that Umsa remained independent and that he did not use its members as his "personal constituency in the DP". He was sworn in to a seat in the National Assembly, the lower house of the South African Parliament.

=== Intelligence Committee ===
At the beginning of the legislative term, the DP nominated Pillay to serve as its sole representative in Parliament's Joint Standing Committee on Intelligence, but in February 2000 it was announced that Pillay had been denied the security clearance necessary to sit on the committee. Although the DP did not share the reasons for the refusal, it wrote to the Speaker of the National Assembly to protest the National Intelligence Agency's decision, saying that it was "based on gossip and hearsay, activated by malice and a misuse of power by the authorities".

Although Pillay was ultimately granted the requisite security clearance, he served on the committee for only a little over a year. In late May 2001, he left the committee and was replaced by the DP's Philip Schalkwyk. The committee chairperson, Nosiviwe Mapisa-Nqakula of the governing ANC, said that Pillay was leaving "under a cloud" and had "compromised national security". Although she did not provide a detailed explanation, she said that the intelligence services had lodged a complaint in December 2000, alleging that Pillay was interfering in operational matters of the South African Secret Service. According to Mapisa-Nqakula, the DP had withdrawn Pillay from the committee because he had acted "beyond the parameters of the conduct set" for committee members.

The DP initially said that Pillay had been replaced as part of a routine reshuffle of the DP parliamentary caucus, and both the party and Pillay said that they were not aware of the substance of the allegations. However, following a meeting between the DP and the committee, Pillay was suspended from his party, pending the outcome of an internal disciplinary hearing. The party said an internal inquiry had found that, though Pillay had not breached security restrictions, he had used his position as an MP to intercede on behalf of a person who had a large financial claim against one of the intelligence agencies.

However, the DP cleared Pillay of wrongdoing in early 2002. He spent the next year leading his party's special task team on unemployment and serving as its deputy spokesman on labour and housing.

=== Defection to the NNP ===
During the floor-crossing window of 2003, DP members were expected formally to join the Democratic Alliance (DA), a new political party that had been established as an informal coalition in 2000 and that was now set to absorb the DP. Pillay did not join the first wave of DP members who crossed to the DA in late March, and instead, in early April, he announced that he had defected to the New National Party (NNP). He said that he was leaving the DA because racism permeated the party and was "entrenched in the DA's constitution".

Pillay went on to serve as the NNP's spokesman on home affairs. He left Parliament after the 2004 general election.
