= Joint Standing Committee on Intelligence =

Committee in the Parliament of South Africa

- Formation: 1995
- Purpose: Oversight of the State Security Agency
- Chairperson: Sylvia Lucas (ANC)
- Parent organisation: Parliament of South Africa

The Joint Standing Committee on Intelligence (JSCI) is a standing committee of the Parliament of South Africa. It is responsible for oversight of the national intelligence services, including the State Security Agency (SSA).

== Establishment and functions ==
The Intelligence Services Oversight Act 40 of 1994 established the committee as a multi-party committee tasked, alongside the Office of the Inspector General of Intelligence, with ensuring civilian oversight of the post-apartheid intelligence services, which at the time were dispersed among multiple military, police, and civilian agencies. The committee was constituted for the first time in September 1995, and President Nelson Mandela appointed Lindiwe Sisulu of the African National Congress (ANC) as the committee's inaugural chairperson.

Under the Act, the committee is empowered, inter alia, to obtain the Auditor-General's reports on the financial statements of the intelligence services; obtain reports on evaluations of secret intelligence projects; initiate and make recommendations on legislation pertaining to the intelligence services; and to order investigations into public complaints and hold hearings on intelligence matters. The committee is also responsible for reviewing reports on interceptions of communications authorised under the Regulation of Interception of Communications and Provision of Communication-Related Information Act.

== Membership and practices ==
In terms of the Act, the JSCI has several operational features that distinguish it from parliamentary portfolio committees. Among other things, all members of the committee are appointed by the president, regardless of their political parties; the chairperson is also selected and appointed by the president, rather than elected from among the committee's members. All members must also be issued a security clearance by the SSA. This security vetting requirement has periodically attracted attention when it obstructs opposition politicians—notably Richard Pillay in 2000—from serving on the committee or when vetting delays obstruct the committee's constitution or quorum.

As a matter of now-entrenched convention, unique among parliamentary committees, the committee meets in camera. This practice, which is not a statutory requirement, is controversial. In 2015, when the committee held secret interviews for the position of Inspector General of Intelligence (made contentious by the ANC's nomination of Cecil Burgess for the position), Right2Know and other civil society organisations strenuously objected, leading the committee to agree to holding subsequent rounds of interviews in public.

Notwithstanding any confidential meetings, the Intelligence Services Oversight Act requires the committee to submit to public reporting by tabling an annual report in Parliament, but critics observe that this reporting is frequently delayed.

During the Zondo Commission hearings, debate over the efficacy of JSCI's oversight functions was revitalised by allegations that the SSA had been victim to political "capture" during the Zuma administration. In the commission's 2022 report, Deputy Chief Justice Raymond Zondo commented on the committee's failures, saying among other things that the JSCI appeared "to have failed to ensure that adequate and timeous steps were taken to address apparently criminal conduct within the intelligence services which has been drawn to its attention." Zondo recommended reform of the JSCI's statutory framework, including stronger requirements for reporting to Parliament, but in 2023, National Assembly Speaker Nosiviwe Mapisa-Nqakula—a former chairperson of the committee—announced that the JSCI had concluded that the relevant deficiencies could be resolved through enhanced "administrative capacity" without making statutory amendments. In subsequent years, the government adopted further-reaching reforms that affected the structure of the intelligence services—disestablishing the SSA—but preserved the JSCI's role.

== List of chairpersons ==
To date, all chairpersons of the committee have been members of the ANC, which was the sole governing party in national government until the May 2024 election.

Session	Chairperson	Party	Year of Appointment	Citation
1st Parliament	Lindiwe Sisulu	ANC	1995	
1st Parliament	Nosiviwe Mapisa-Nqakula	ANC	1996	
2nd Parliament	Nosiviwe Mapisa-Nqakula	ANC	1996	
2nd Parliament	Siyabonga Cwele	ANC	2002	
3rd Parliament	Siyabonga Cwele	ANC	2002	
3rd Parliament	Cecil Burgess	ANC	2008	
4th Parliament	Cecil Burgess	ANC	2008	
5th Parliament	Connie September	ANC	2014	
5th Parliament	Charles Nqakula	ANC	2016	
5th Parliament	Amos Masondo	ANC	2018	
6th Parliament	Jerome Maake	ANC	2019	
7th Parliament	Sylvia Lucas	ANC	2025	

== See also ==
- Security sector governance and reform
- Intelligence law
