= John Bilankulu =

South African politician

Member of the National Assembly of South Africa
- In office 22 May 2019 – 28 May 2024

Personal details
- Born: John Hlengani Bilankulu; 19 February 1966 (age 60)
- Party: African National Congress
- Occupation: Member of Parliament
- Profession: Politician

John Hlengani Bilankulu (born 19 February 1966) is a South African politician from Limpopo who served as a Member of Parliament (MP) in the National Assembly of South Africa from May 2019 until May 2024. Bilankulu is a member of the African National Congress.

== Parliamentary career ==
Bilankulu was ranked number 5 on the regional Limpopo list of the African National Congress for the 8 May 2019 national and provincial elections. After the elections, he was allocated a seat in the National Assembly. He was sworn into the 6th Parliament on 22 May.

In June 2019, Bilankulu was named to the Portfolio Committee on Mineral Resources and Energy. Bilankulu also serves an alternate member of the Portfolio Committee on Transport.

Bilankulu was not included on any ANC electoral list for the 2024 general election and left parliament as a result.
