= Stanley Ramaila =

South African politician (born 1961)

The Honourable Stanley Ramaila

Member of the National Assembly
- Incumbent
- Assumed office 14 June 2024

Executive Mayor of the Sekhukhune District Municipality
- In office August 2016 – February 2022
- Succeeded by: Julia Mathebe

Personal details
- Born: Keamotseng Stanley Ramaila; 22 March 1961 (age 65)
- Party: African National Congress

Keamotseng Stanley Ramaila (born 22 March 1961) is a South African politician from Limpopo Province who has represented the African National Congress (ANC) in the National Assembly since June 2024. He was formerly the mayor of Sekhukhune District Municipality between 2016 and 2022.

== Early life and career ==
Born on 22 March 1961, Ramaila became politically active during apartheid as a high school student and member of his school's student representative council. After he dropped out of school, he continued his activism in the National Union of Mineworkers while working as a miner in Emalahleni. Later he returned to school to complete his matric, completed a teaching diploma at the Sekhukhune College of Education in Sekukhune, and became a teacher, continuing his union activism in the teaching union.

== Career in local government ==
After the end of apartheid, Ramaila joined local government as a representative of the African National Congress (ANC). He was elected as a local councillor in the Greater Sekhukhune District Municipality when it was established in the December 2000 local elections.

On 26 August 2016, following that month's local elections, the ANC's majority caucus elected Ramaila unopposed as executive mayor of the Sekukhune District Municipality. His mayoral term coincided with political and fiscal tumult in the municipality. Near the end of his term, in February 2020, he described widespread corruption in the municipality, telling City Press, "There is a syndicate in this municipality that we must uproot. Last week I told officials that my life is under threat because I’m fighting corruption but, like a soldier, I will die with my boots on."

At the next local elections in November 2021, the ANC retained its majority in Sekhukhune, but Ramaila's presumptive re-election was challenged by a group of his opponents inside the ANC, who challenged his nomination with the party's National Executive Committee and sued to challenge the decision in court. The legal challenge was dismissed in the Limpopo High Court, and shortly afterwards the Sekhukhune council met and re-elected Ramaila as mayor. However, later the same month, Ramaila was ousted from his position as ANC regional chairperson by the speaker in his council, Julia Mathebe. Ramaila subsequently resigned from the mayoral seat and Mathebe was elected to succeed him in February 2022. He served as Member of the Mayoral Committee (MMC) for Community Services in Mathebe's government, but her government was shortlived and her successor, Mayor Maleke Mokganyetji, fired Ramaila from the mayoral committee in December 2022.

== Legislative career ==
In May 2024 general election, Ramaila stood as a candidate for election to the national Parliament of South Africa, ranked 176th on the ANC's national party list. He was elected to a seat in the National Assembly, where he serves in the Portfolio Committee on Water and Sanitation and Portfolio Committee on Social Development.
