= Inspector-General of Intelligence (South Africa) =

Office of the Inspector-General of Intelligence
Agency overview
- Formed: 1994
- Jurisdiction: Government of South Africa
- Minister responsible: Cyril Ramaphosa, President of South Africa
- Agency executive: Imtiaz Fazel, Inspector-General
- Website: www.oigi.gov.za

Inspector-General of Intelligence (IGI) monitors and reviews the operations of the intelligence services of South Africa which include the State Security Agency, Defence Intelligence Division of the South African National Defence Force and Crime Intelligence Division of the South African Police Service. Its second function is to investigate complaints from the South African public as to possible abuses of the constitution and intelligence laws by the intelligence services.

== Functions ==
The following are a summary of the functions of the Inspector-General of Intelligence and his department as legislated Intelligence Services Act, 1994:

- to monitor compliance by any Service with the Constitution, applicable laws and relevant policies on intelligence and counter-intelligence;
- to review the intelligence and counter-intelligence activities of any Service;
- to perform all functions designated to him or her by the President or any Minister responsible for a Service;
- to receive and investigate complaints from members of the public and members of the Services on alleged maladministration, abuse of power, transgressions of the Constitution, laws and policies referred in intelligence and counter-intelligence, the commission of an offences and improper enrichment of any person through an act or omission of any member;
- submit the certificates to Minister's in charge each intelligence service stating the IGI's level of satisfaction concerning the annual reports submitted to him or her concerning their activities;
- to submit reports to the Joint Standing Committee on Intelligence;
- to submit reports to each Minister of intelligence services as to their performance of the first four functions above. Provided that where the Inspector-General performs functions designated to him or her by the President, he or she shall report to the President;
- the reports of the Inspector-General the Minister's of intelligence services as to monitoring and reviewing shall contain the findings and recommendations of the Inspector-General.

The IGI is accountable for his departments activities and reports to the Joint Standing Committee on Intelligence (JSCI) at least once per year.

== Powers ==
The Act gives the Inspector-General and his or her office the following power to conduct its functions:

- has access to any intelligence, information and premises of the intelligence services the IGI is accountable for and request from their heads or employees any intelligence, information, reports or explanations;
- notify the head of intelligence service when accessing the premises including date and nature of the visit;
- can only disclose intelligence or information after consulting the President, a Minister of an intelligence service, subject to any restrictions by the IGI and only if such disclosure is not detrimental to the country's interest;
- shall have access to any intelligence, information and premises of other non-intelligence services, under an issued search warrant and request from people any intelligence, information, reports or explanations necessary to perform its functions;
- can only disclose intelligence or information from a non-intelligence service after consulting the information provider, the President, subject to any restrictions by IGI and only if such disclosure is not detrimental to the country's interest
- no access to intelligence, information or premises of the intelligence services that the IGI is accountable for may be withheld from the IGI on any grounds.

The Act outlines the penalties for the failure to disclose information as one of being guilty of an offence and liable on conviction to a fine or to imprisonment for a period not exceeding five years.

== Inspectors-General ==
- 1996: Lewis Skweyiya
- 1996-2000: Vacant
- 2001-2002 - Fazel Randera
- 2004-2009 - Zola Ngcakani
- 2010-2015 - Faith Radebe
- 2017-2022 - Setlhomamaru Dintwe
- 2022-2025 - Imtiaz Fazel (now suspended)

== Appointment process ==
The South African Parliamentary Joint Standing Committee on Intelligence overseas the nomination and interviews of potential candidates for the position of IGI. The candidate must be South African, fit and proper with a knowledge of intelligence. The JSCI then nominates the most suitable candidate for appointment by the President and whose decision is approved by the National Assembly by means of a two-thirds majority vote. The IGI can only be removed or suspended by the President.
