= Désirée van der Walt =

South African politician

Désirée van der Walt MP
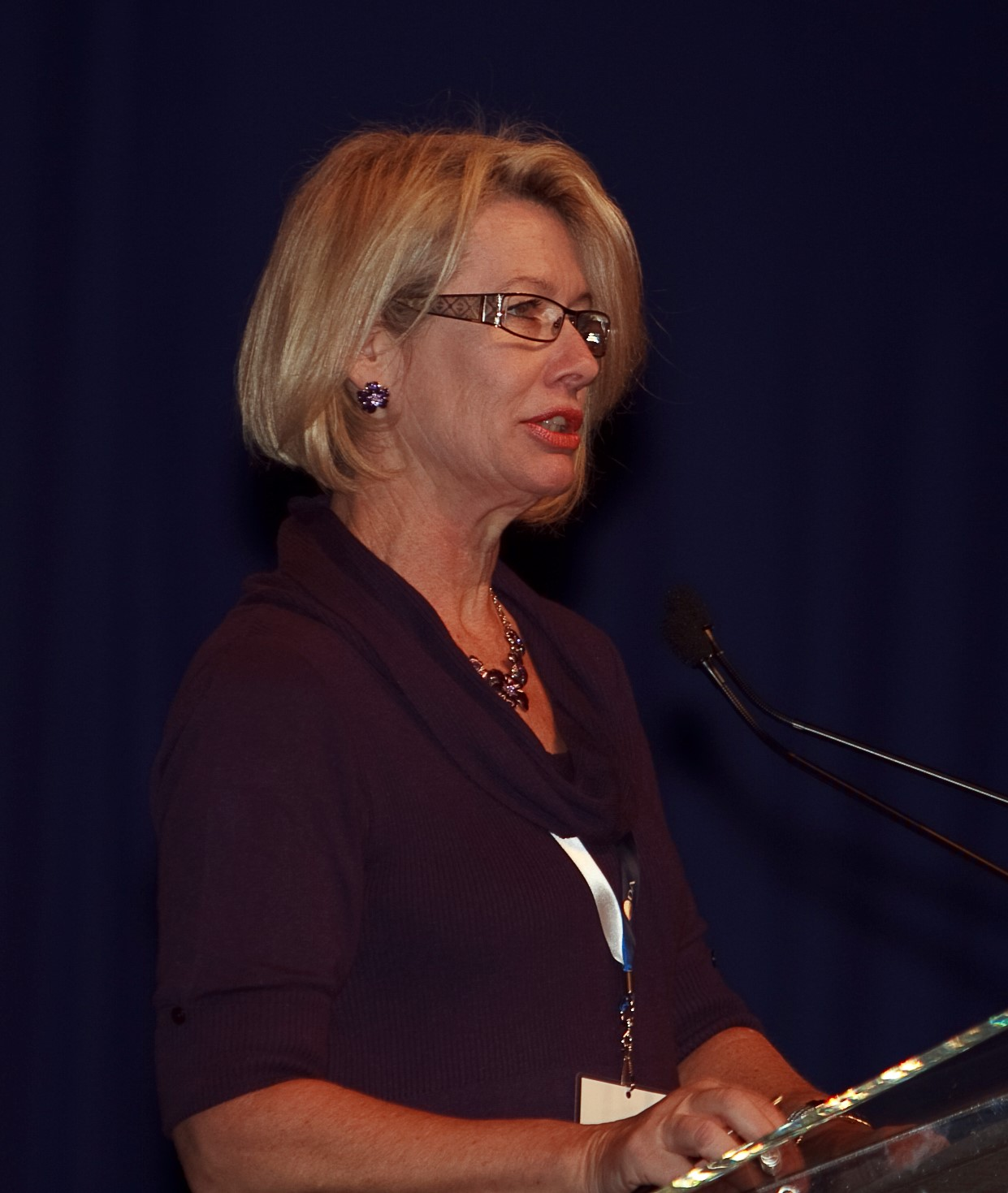

Member of the National Assembly of South Africa
- Incumbent
- Assumed office 1 August 2023
- Preceded by: Lindy Wilson
- In office 21 May 2014 – 30 April 2023
- Succeeded by: Jacques Smalle
- In office 21 April 2004 – 10 September 2010
- Succeeded by: Jacques Smalle

Member of the Limpopo Provincial Legislature
- In office 5 May 2023 – 31 July 2023
- Preceded by: Jacques Smmalle
- Succeeded by: Lindy Wilson
- In office 28 September 2010 – 6 May 2014
- Preceded by: Jacques Smalle

Leader of the Democratic Alliance in Limpopo
- In office 2008 – 9 June 2012
- Preceded by: Mike Holford
- Succeeded by: Jacques Smalle

Personal details
- Born: 20 April 1956 (age 70) Pietersburg, Transvaal Province, Union of South Africa
- Party: Democratic Alliance
- Domestic partner: Manny de Gouveia (2011–2021; his death)
- Children: 2 daughters
- Education: Hoërskool Klerksdorp
- Occupation: Politician

Désirée van der Walt (born 20 April 1956) is a South African politician who has been a Member of the National Assembly of South Africa since August 2023, previously serving in the Assembly between 2004 and 2010 and again from 2014 to 2023. She was a member of the Limpopo Provincial Legislature from 2010 to 2014 and again in 2023. Van der Walt is a member of the Democratic Alliance.

== Early life ==
Désirée van der Walt was born in Pietersburg in what was then the Transvaal Province. She is the eldest of four children. Her father died while she was a young child. She had the aspirations to become an educator, but could not due to financial constraints. She was then employed by a banking institution. She later married and gave birth to two daughters. Van der Walt briefly worked for the National Department of Education.

== Political career ==
Van der Walt was elected to the Roodepoort City Council in 1995 and served until 2000. She was elected as a Tzaneen Municipality councillor in 2000 and served until her election to the National Assembly in 2004. She served as the DA's Spokesperson on Arts and Culture. She was elected as the Provincial Leader of the Limpopo Democratic Alliance in 2008.

Van der Walt was re-elected to a second term as a Member of the National Assembly in 2009, but she resigned as an MP on 10 September 2010, as she was sworn in as a Member of the Limpopo Provincial Legislature.

In 2012, DA MP Jacques Smalle unseated her as Provincial Leader of the party.

She returned to the National Assembly of South Africa in 2014. She took office on 21 May 2014. The newly elected DA Parliamentary Leader Mmusi Maimane selected her to be the Shadow Deputy Minister of Basic Education. Later on, she assumed the role of Shadow Minister of Public Service and Administration.

Van der Walt was elected the Deputy Provincial Chairperson of the Democratic Alliance in February 2015. She was elected as one of three Deputy Federal Chairpersons of the Democratic Alliance at the party's Federal Congress in May 2015. She served alongside Ivan Meyer and Refiloe Nt'sekhe until 2018 when she was defeated for re-election.

She was elected Provincial Chairperson of the Democratic Alliance Women's Network in October 2017, as Lindy Wilson succeeded her as Deputy Provincial Chairperson.

In 2018, she was appointed the head of the Democratic Alliance's Mopani constituency. She was previously head of the party's Waterberg South constituency.

On 5 June 2019, Van der Walt was named Shadow Deputy Minister of Basic Education.

Following her election as Caucus Chairperson, Van der Walt was appointed an Additional Member of the Basic Education portfolio of John Steenhuisen's Shadow Cabinet on 21 April 2023.

Van der Walt resigned from the National Assembly on 30 April 2023, in preparation for her return to the Limpopo Provincial Legislature, to replace Jacques Smalle, who in turn would be taking up her seat in the National Assembly. She was sworn in as a member of the Limpopo Provincial Legislature on 5 May 2023 She was then elected as the DA caucus leader in the legislature on 8 May. Van der Walt contested the provincial chairperson position at the DA's provincial conference on 27 May 2023. She was defeated by Smalle.

Van der Walt resigned as a member of the Provincial Legislature in late-July 2023 to make way for newly elected DA provincial leader Lindy Wilson to take up her seat. Van der Walt was, in turn, appointed to take up Wilson's seat in the National Assembly.

== Personal life ==
Van der Walt was in a relationship with Manny de Gouveia for 10 years. They lived together in Tzaneen. De Gouveia died from COVID-19 on 22 January 2021 during the COVID-19 pandemic in South Africa.
