= Beyers Smit =

South African politician

Beyers Smit MP

Member of the National Assembly
- Incumbent
- Assumed office 22nd May 2024

Permanent delegate to the National Council of Provinces
- In office 22 May 2014 – 14 May 2024

Personal details
- Born: Christiaan Frederik Beyers Smit
- Party: Democratic Alliance
- Occupation: Member of Parliament
- Profession: Politician

Christiaan Frederik Beyers Smit is a South African politician who has been a permanent delegate on the National Council of Provinces from May 2014 to May 2024. Smit is a member of the Limpopo delegation and a party member of the Democratic Alliance.

== Political career ==
Smit is a former PR and Executive councillor of the Mogalakwena Local Municipality. In October 2017, he was elected as one of two deputy provincial chairpersons of the Democratic Alliance.

== Parliamentary career ==
Following the general election that was held on 7 May 2014, Smit was elected as a permanent delegate to the National Council of Provinces from Limpopo. He was sworn in as a Member of Parliament on 22 May 2014. In June 2014, he was assigned to his committees for the 2014–2019 term.

On 23 May 2019, Smit took office for his second term as a permanent delegate to the NCOP. The DA appointed him as their shadow chairperson. He was named to his new committees on 24 June 2019.

He was elected to the National Assembly of South Africa in 2024.

Beyer is openly gay.

=== Current assignments ===
- Joint Committee on Ethics and Members' Interests
- Select Committee on Land Reform, Environment, Mineral Resources and Energy
- Select Committee on Public Enterprises and Communication

=== Past committee assignments ===
- Select Committee on Communications and Public Enterprises (2014–2019)
- Select Committee on Land and Mineral Resources (2014–2019)
