= Masefako Dikgale =

South African politician

Member of the National Assembly of South Africa
- In office 22 May 2019 – 30 January 2023
- Succeeded by: Maropene Ramokgopa
- Constituency: Limpopo

Permanent delegate to the National Council of Provinces from Limpopo
- In office 7 May 2009 – 7 May 2019

Personal details
- Party: African National Congress
- Education: University of Limpopo; University of the Witwatersrand; University of South Africa

Masefako Clarah Dikgale is a South African politician who was a Member of the National Assembly of South Africa from 2019 to 2023. Prior to serving in the National Assembly, she served as a permanent delegate to the National Council of Provinces from Limpopo from 2009 to 2019. Dikgale is a member of the African National Congress.

== Education ==
Dikgale graduated from the University of Limpopo with a honours degree in education. She completed a PALAMA leadership and governance short course with the University of South Africa and the University of the Witwatersrand.

== Political career ==
Dikgale served as the secretary of the ANC Women's League of the ANC Manyoro branch in ward 33 in the Polokwane Local Municipality. She is current chairperson of the ANC's Charles Rawane branch in Ga-Dikgale in Polokwane under the Mankweng Cluster. Dikgale is the current national treasurer of the Congress of Traditional Leaders of South Africa and the current chairperson of CONTRALESA's women's wing in Limpopo.

== Parliamentary career ==
=== National Council of Provinces ===
In 2009, she was elected as an ANC permanent delegate to the National Council of Provinces from Limpopo. She was re-elected in 2014. She was then elected House Chairperson for International Relations and Members Interests.

==== Committee memberships ====
- Select Committee on Trade and International Relations
- Select Committee on Appropriations
- Select Committee on Economic Development
- Select Committee on Finance
- Ad Hoc Committee on General Intelligence Laws Amendment Bill
- Joint Standing Committee on Defence
- Select Committee on Economic and Business Development
- Ad Hoc Committee on the Review of Parmed

=== National Assembly of South Africa ===
In 2019, she stood for election to the South African National Assembly as 3rd on the ANC's Limpopo list. At the election, Dikgale won a seat in the National Assembly.

Dikgale was one of four ANC MPs who resigned parliament in late-January and early-February 2023 to make way for newly elected members of the ANC national leadership to be sworn in.

==== Committee memberships ====
- Rules of the National Assembly
- Standing Committee on Appropriations
- Constitutional Review Committee
- Joint Standing Committee on Intelligence

== Personal life ==
Isaac Lesiba Maphotho, Cassel Mathale, Soviet Lekganyane, Thandi Modise, Baleka Mbete, Stanley Mathabatha, Rosina Semenya and Maite Nkoana-Mashabane are her political idols. Her interests include reading, singing and talking.
