= Kate Bilankulu =

South African politician

Kate Bilankulu MP

Member of the National Assembly of South Africa
- Incumbent
- Assumed office 22 May 2019

Personal details
- Born: Nkhensani Kate Bilankulu; 14 February 1966 (age 60)
- Party: African National Congress
- Occupation: Member of Parliament
- Profession: Politician

Nkhensani Kate Bilankulu (born 14 February 1966) is a South African politician from Limpopo. She has been a member of parliament (MP) in the National Assembly of South Africa since May 2019. She is a member of the African National Congress.

== Parliamentary career ==
Bilankulu was placed number 1 on the regional Limpopo list of the African National Congress for the 8 May 2019 national and provincial elections. After the elections, she was allocated a seat in the National Assembly. She was sworn into the 6th Parliament on 22 May.

On 29 June 2019, she was appointed to Portfolio Committee on Social Development. On 12 July 2019, she was elected chairperson of the Committee on Multi-Party Women's Caucus.

She is also the deputy chair of the ANC Women's League.

Bilankulu was re-elected for a second term in the 2024 general election.
