= Thomas Gumbu =

South African politician

Member of the National Assembly of South Africa
- In office 22 May 2019 – 28 May 2024

Personal details
- Born: Tshilidzi Thomas Gumbu; 27 March 1967 (age 59)
- Party: African National Congress
- Profession: Politician
- Committees: Portfolio Committee on Communications

Tshilidzi Thomas Gumbu (born 27 March 1967) is a South African politician from Limpopo who served as a member of the National Assembly of South Africa from 2019 until 2024. Gumbu is a member of the African National Congress.

== Education and career ==
Gumbu has matric. He has worked as a regional organiser for the African National Congress.

== Parliamentary career ==
Gumbu stood for election to the National Assembly of South Africa in the 2019 general election as a candidate on the ANC's list of Limpopo National Assembly candidates. He was elected as the ANC won 15 list seats in the province.

On 22 May 2019, Gumbu became a Member of Parliament in the National Assembly. During his term in parliament, he served on the Portfolio Committee on Communications.

He left parliament at the 2024 general election.
