= Ciliesta Motsepe =

South African politician

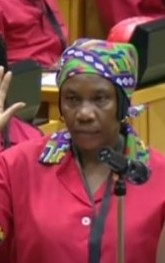

Member of the South African National Assembly
- In office 22 May 2019 – 1 June 2023
- Succeeded by: Mzwanele Manyi

Personal details
- Party: Economic Freedom Fighters
- Profession: Politician

Ciliesta Catherine Shoana Motsepe was a South African Member of Parliament for the Economic Freedom Fighters. She was elected to parliament in 2019. From June 2020, she was a member of the Portfolio Committee on Public Service and Administration. In March 2023, she was appointed to serve on the Portfolio Committee on Mineral Resources and Energy.

Motsepe was also an additional member of the EFF's Central Command Team, its highest decision-making structure.

On 6 June 2023, News24 reported that the EFF had fired Motsepe as a member of Parliament.
