= N. S. Puleng =

South African writer

N. S. Puleng (Samuel Puleng Nkomo) is a writer in the Northern Sotho language. He was born 10 January 1958 in South Africa, in the "Blacks only" township of Bengweni, which was next to Randfontein, which was a Whites-only town. His father was a missionary who had come from (then) Rhodesia as a Christian missionary. Because his father died early, he was raised by his mother, Sarah "Peggy" Priscilla Mmapoo, a nurse and midwife.

Mokgoatsana points out some influences in his writing, including his mother (especially in her role as nurse, seen in his poem Sekutupu), Phatudi Sekhukhune (his literary mentor), Simon R. Mamabolo and A. M. Ramonyai. His writings show a knowledge of the Bible, but Mokgoatsana believes that "The primary influence in Puleng derives largely from African cosmology… the cosmological origin of life informs the poetry of N. S. Puleng. "Puleng's poetry is to a large extent autobiographical. This is evident in his dramatic text Thellenyane ba tla bolela where the main character seems to be a disguised representation of the author."

"As an African, Puleng could not escape the African world view which gives impetus to his poetic works. Within his poetry Puleng is seen vacillating between the two poles: Christianity and African Traditional Religion. This religious plurality is reflective of what pertains to most Africans in Africa in general, where one or more religions are competing with the traditional religion of the original inhabitants... A large content of his poetry is allusive to hymns and various books of the Bible." His "father's Biblical influence upon his son's writings" has been noted. Examples of Biblical infleuences in his poetry include a paraphrasae of part of the Lord's Prayer. In addition, his Christian influences include echoes of some hymns.

Most of Puleng's writings have not been translated into English, yet. The poem "Kgadi'a Bakone", "Images of a Woman in Marriage" has been translated by Manthiba Phalane and is available online.

In terms of poetic technique, his use of Northern Sotho proverbs, in their standard forms or in forms he has altered, has been praised. In addition, he used poetic structures that are common across the world, such as parallelism, rhyme, rhythm, repetition, metaphor, personification, symbolism, and satire.

Puleng touched on a variety of themes in his poetry. His poem Bohwa bja ka "My Inheritance" was as protest against Apartheid.

The poetry of Puleng is recognized as being of "a high standard" and is recommended to be included in the high school curriculum and taught in high schools where Northern Sotho is spoken.

== Works by N.S. Puleng ==
- Seboko se tsene nyobeng. Pietersburg: SABC. 1978.
- Ditlalemeso. Pretoria: J.L. Van Schaik. 1980.
- Seipone sa Madimabe. Pretoria: J.L. Van Schaik. 1981.
- Kgaa kgati ya khwiti ya noka yeso. Johannesburg: Edu cum. 1983.
- Malopo a boreti. Pretoria: Van Schaik. 1983.
- antSu a ke a bomang? Pietersburg: SABC. 1984.
- Go thaila mathaithai mo! Pietersburg: SABC. 1989.
- Thellenyane Batlabolela. Pretoria: De Jager Haum. 1990.
- Sefahlego sa pelo ya ka. Pretoria: J.L. Van Schaik. 1991.
- Le diphiri di tla utologa. Pretoria: Kagiso Publishers. 1994.
- Thellenyane Batlabolela. a drama which also prompts one to believe that it is an autobiography. 1990.
- Seboko se tsene nyobeng. a one act play.
- MantSu a ke a bomang?. a one act play which won him the Astera Prize in 1984.
- Go thaila mathaithai mo. a radio serial drama for which he was nominated for the Idem award in 1989.
- Le diphiri di tla utologa. an anthology of radio serials that had been broadcast on Radio Lebowa, published by de Jager Raum. 1994.
- A leka Kaleka Maleka. a one act play, received a first prize and became an over-all winner in the De Jager Raum 1994/95 Literary competition for the category: Northern Sotho One Act Plays.
- Choral music, various
- Ditlalemeso. an anthology of poetry. 1980.
- Seipone sa madimabe. an anthology of poetry won him the E.M. Ramaila Prize in 1985. 1981.
- Kgaa kgati tSa khwiti ya noka yeso. an anthology of poetry. 1983.
- Malopo a boreti. "one of his masterpieces". 1983.
- Sefahlego sa pelo ya ka. 1991.

Some of his poems appear in M.S. Serudu's collections Ma!Swela (1989) and Sesegotheto (1989).

== Relevant literature ==
- Kgoana, P. 0. 1991. An Exposition of Northern Sotho Elegiac Poetry With Special Reference to the Poetry of S.r. Machaka, H.M.L. Lentsoane and Puleng. An unpublished BA(Hons) Extended Essay. Sovenga: University of the North.
- Lentosane, L.H.M. 1996. Direto tsa N. S. Puleng. MA dissertation. Pretoria: University of South Africa.
- Mamabolo, MR 1991. Religion in N. S. Puleng's Poetry With Special Reference to Seipone Sa Madimabe (1981) An unpublished BA(Hons) Extended Essay. Sovenga: University of the North.
- Mokgoatsana, Sekgothe Ngwato Cedric (1996) Some Aspects of N.S. Puleng's Poetry, University of South Africa, Pretoria,
- Mokgoatšana, Sekgothe. "Nkosi Sikelel'iAfrika:(dis) harmony or Justice (?)." South African Journal of African Languages 19, no. 1 (1999): 46–51.
- Mokgoatšana, Sekgothe. "'Old wine in new bottles': Heteroglossia or (un) conscious (re) production in NS Puleng's poetry." South African Journal of African Languages 42, no. 1 (2022): 9-16.
- Phalane, Manthiba. "'Kgadi'a Bakone' NS Puleng". Almas Urdu Research Journal 8, no. 1 (2005): 12–19.
- Tshauke, Maisaya H. The poetry of NS Puleng. MA thesis, VISTA University of Johannesburg (South Africa), 2014.
