= Raesibe Moatshe =

South African politician

Member of the National Assembly of South Africa
- In office 22 May 2019 – 28 May 2024

Personal details
- Born: 2 September 1973 (age 52)
- Party: African National Congress
- Profession: Politician

Raesibe Martha Moatshe (born 2 September 1973) is a South African politician who was elected to the National Assembly of South Africa in the 2019 general election. Moatshe is a member of the African National Congress.

In parliament, she served on the Portfolio Committee on Trade and Industry. She did not stand in the 2024 general election and left parliament.
