= Puleng Mashangoane =

South African politician

Member of the National Assembly
- In office 23 April 2004 – June 2009
- Constituency: Limpopo

Personal details
- Citizenship: South Africa
- Party: African National Congress

Puleng Roseline Mashangoane is a South African politician who represented the African National Congress (ANC) in the National Assembly from 2004 to 2009. She represented the Limpopo constituency. After her term in the assembly, she represented the ANC as a local councillor in Capricorn District Municipality and Polokwane Local Municipality.
