= Maakgalake Pholwane =

South African politician

Maakgalake Pholwane MP

Member of the National Assembly of South Africa
- Incumbent
- Assumed office 2024
- Constituency: regional list for Limpopo

Personal details
- Citizenship: South Africa
- Party: African National Congress

Maakgalake Beneilwe Pholwane is a South African politician who has been a Member of Parliament (MP) for the African National Congress from the regional list for Limpopo. Prior to her election to the National Assembly, she served as speaker of the municipal council of Fetakgomo Tubatse Local Municipality.
