= Carol Phiri =

South African politician

Carol Phiri MP

Member of Parliament from Limpopo
- Incumbent
- Assumed office 22 May 2019

Personal details
- Party: ANC

Carol Mokgadi Phiri is a South African politician. She has been a Member of Parliament (MP) for the African National Congress.

She was mayor of Musina Local Municipality until 2014.
