= Donald Selamolela =

South African politician

Donald Selamolela MPL

Member of the Limpopo Provincial Legislature
- Incumbent
- Assumed office 22 May 2019

Personal details
- Citizenship: South Africa
- Party: African National Congress

Selelo Donald Selamolela is a South African politician who is currently serving as a Member of the Limpopo Provincial Legislature. In December 2022, he was elected to a five-year term on the National Executive Committee of the African National Congress (ANC), and he was formerly the spokesperson of the ANC's Limpopo branch from 2018 to 2022.

== Career ==
Selamolela has a postgraduate degree from the University of Limpopo. He formerly headed the Youth Development Directorate in the Office of the Limpopo Premier and was a prominent member of the Limpopo branch of the African National Congress (ANC) Youth League. In June 2018, he was elected to the Provincial Executive Committee (PEC) of the ANC in Limpopo and became its official spokesperson. In July of that year, the Sowetan reported that Limpopo Premier Stan Mathabatha had intended to appoint Selamolela to the Limpopo Executive Council but had been overruled on the grounds that it was necessary to ensure gender diversity in the council.

In the 2019 general election, Selamolela was ranked 12th on the ANC's party list and was elected for the first time to a seat in the Limpopo Provincial Legislature. He was also elected chair of the legislature's committee on Economic Development, Environmental Affairs and Tourism.

Towards the end of his term as PEC member and spokesperson, Selamolela emerged as a candidate for election as Provincial Treasurer of the ANC's Limpopo branch. His campaign was reportedly proposed by a lobby which sought to ensure representation of young people in the party leadership, and it was supported by the ANC's Norman Mashabane region – the largest in the province – and by some branches in the Peter Mokaba region. However, when the party's provincial elective conference opened in June 2022, Selamolela declined nomination to the party treasury, saying that he had faith in both of the other candidates, Nakedi Sibanda-Kekana and Faith Chauke. At the same conference, he failed to gain re-election to the ANC PEC.

In December 2022, at the ANC's 55th National Conference, Selamolela was elected to a five-year term on the party's National Executive Committee. His candidacy was endorsed by the national leadership of the ANC Youth League and by number of votes received he was ranked 58th of the 80 candidates elected, receiving 1,143 votes across the 4,029 ballots cast.
