= Steve Chabane =

South African politician

Steve Chabane MP

Member of Parliament from Limpopo
- Incumbent
- Assumed office 2019

Personal details
- Other political affiliations: African National Congress

Mosa Steve Chabane is a South African politician who has been a Member of Parliament (MP) for the African National Congress.
