= Jerome Maake =

South African politician and apartheid political prisoner

Chairperson of the Joint Standing Committee on Intelligence
- In office 14 November 2019 – 28 May 2024
- Preceded by: Amos Masondo

Member of the National Assembly
- In office 6 May 2009 – 28 May 2024

Personal details
- Born: Jerome Joseph Maake
- Party: African National Congress (1980-present)
- Education: University of the Western Cape; Napier University; Stellenbosch University
- Occupation: Member of Parliament
- Profession: Politician

Jerome Joseph Maake is a South African politician and former political prisoner under apartheid who served as the Chairperson of the Joint Standing Committee on Intelligence from 2019 until 2024. A member of the African National Congress, Maake was a Member of the National Assembly of South Africa from 2009 until 2024.

== Background ==
Maake graduated from the University of Western Cape with a Bachelor of Commerce degree and holds a degree in Business Management from Napier University. He has a Master's degree in Economic Policy from Stellenbosch University.

Maake joined the ANC in 1980 while in Swaziland. He was a UMkhonto we Sizwe (MK) soldier and trained in Angola. He returned to South Africa in 1981 and conducted MK operations in the then Northern Transvaal. In 1982 Maake was arrested and sentenced to thirteen years imprisonment at Robben Island. He appealed the sentence in 1985 and won the appeal. There was a re-trail in Pietermaritzburg and he was given a suspended sentence. After the 1985 State of Emergency, he left South Africa and travelled to Angola again and attended a MK refresher course. In 1986, he returned to South Africa again and operated in the Mawudse area.

== Parliamentary career ==
In 2009, Maake was elected to the National Assembly of South Africa as an African National Congress representative and has been re-elected since in 2014 and 2019. He has served on the police, intelligence, defence, education, arts and culture, and public enterprises committees.

On 14 November 2019, he was appointed as chairperson of the Joint Standing Committee on Intelligence.

Maake was ranked too low on the ANC national list to be returned to parliament following the 2024 general election.
