= List of members of the 3rd Mpumalanga Provincial Legislature =

3rd Mpumalanga Provincial Legislature
←	2nd Legislature	4th Legislature	→

Overview
- Legislative body: Mpumalanga Provincial Legislature
- Jurisdiction: Mpumalanga, South Africa
- Term: 26 April 2004 – May 2009
- Election: 14 April 2004
- Members: 30
- Speaker: Pinky Phosa
- Deputy Speaker: Boy Nobunga
- Premier: Thabang Makwetla

This is a list of members of the third Mpumalanga Provincial Legislature, as elected in the election of 14 April 2004. The African National Congress (ANC) consolidated its majority in the legislature, winning 27 seats in the 30-seat legislature. The Democratic Alliance also increased its representation, winning two seats, and the Freedom Front Plus retained a single seat. The New National Party and United Democratic Movement lost the seats they had held in the prior legislature.

When the legislature convened for its first session on 26 April 2004, the ANC's Thabang Makwetla was elected as the third Premier of Mpumalanga. He opened his term with a major reshuffle of the Mpumalanga Executive Council. Pinky Phosa was elected as Speaker of the Mpumalanga Provincial Legislature, with Boy Nobunga as her deputy.

== Composition ==
Representation of parties
Party	Seats
African National Congress	27
Democratic Alliance	2
Freedom Front Plus	1
Total	30

== Members ==
This is a list of members of the Mpumalanga Provincial Legislature as elected on 14 April 2004. It does not take into account changes in membership after the election.

Membership as elected in 2004
Member	Party
Anthony Maximilian Benadie	DA
Mmathulare Coleman	ANC
Mabhuza Ginindza	ANC
Clive Winston Hatch	DA
William Lubisi	ANC
Jacob Mabena	ANC
Regalda Thoko Mabena	ANC
Jabulane Stephen Mabona	ANC
David Mabuza	ANC
Fish Mahlalela	ANC
Jabu Mahlangu	ANC
Ndaweni Mahlangu	ANC
Refilwe Caroline Mahlobogoane	ANC
Thabang Makwetla	ANC
Louis Johannes Botha Marneweck	FF+
Siphosezwe Masango	ANC
Candith Mashego	ANC
Madala Masuku	ANC
David Mkwanazi	ANC
Jackson Mthembu	ANC
Nomsa Mtsweni	ANC
Phumuzile Catherine Ngwenya	ANC
Boy Nobunga	ANC
Craig Novine Martin Padayachee	ANC
Pogisho Edwin Pasha	ANC
Pinky Phosa	ANC
Dina Pule	ANC
Vusi Shongwe	ANC
Sidney Norman Sikhosana	ANC
Gelana Sarian Sindane	ANC
