= List of members of the 4th Mpumalanga Provincial Legislature =

4th Mpumalanga Provincial Legislature
←	3rd Legislature	5th Legislature	→

Overview
- Legislative body: Mpumalanga Provincial Legislature
- Jurisdiction: Mpumalanga, South Africa
- Term: 6 May 2009 – May 2014
- Election: 22 April 2009
- Members: 30
- Speaker: Jackson Mthembu (2009); William Lubisi (2009–2014)
- Deputy Speaker: Violet Siwela (2009–2013); David Dube (2013–2014)
- Premier: David Mabuza

This is a list of members of the fourth Mpumalanga Provincial Legislature, as elected in the election of 22 April 2009. The African National Congress (ANC) retained its majority of 27 seats in the 30-seat legislature. The Democratic Alliance also retained its two seats. The Freedom Front Plus, however, lost its representation in the legislature, ceding its seat to a new entrant, the Congress of the People.

When the legislature convened for its first session on 6 May 2009, the ANC's David Mabuza was elected as the fourth Premier of Mpumalanga. He announced his Executive Council after his inauguration on 12 May. Jackson Mthembu was elected as Speaker of the Mpumalanga Provincial Legislature, with Violet Siwela as his deputy. However, Mthembu resigned from the position later in 2009 and was replaced by William Lubisi, who had formerly been Speaker during the legislature's first and second sessions. Likewise, Siwela was appointed to the Executive Council in February 2013 and was replaced as Deputy Speaker by David Dube.

The legislature met for the last time on 27 March 2014 before entering recess ahead of the 2014 general election.

== Composition ==
Representation of parties
Party	Seats
African National Congress	27
Democratic Alliance	2
Congress of the People	1
Total	30

== Members ==
This is a list of members of the Mpumalanga Provincial Legislature as elected on 22 April 2009. It does not take into account changes in membership after the election.

Membership as elected in 2009
Member	Party
Anthony Maximilian Benadie	DA
Thandi Cindrella Dibakoane	ANC
William Lubisi	ANC
Lazarus Thabelang Maabane	ANC
David Mabuza	ANC
Fish Mahlalela	ANC
Jabu Mahlangu	ANC
Refilwe Caroline Mahlobogoane	ANC
Bonakele Majuba	ANC
Meshack Themba Malinga	ANC
Nomakhosi Ceseline Mamabolo	ANC
Dumisa Reuben Mango	ANC
Velly Makasana Manzini	DA
Siphosezwe Masango	ANC
Madala Masuku	ANC
Reginah Mhaule	ANC
Clifford Rhulani Mkasi	ANC
Norman Mohlalefi Mokoena	ANC
Jackson Mthembu	ANC
Refilwe Mtsweni	ANC
Raymond Sizile Ndlovu	COPE
Patricia Ngobeni	ANC
Jabhile Pretty Ngubeni	ANC
Fikile Mavis Nyembe	ANC
Pinky Phosa	ANC
Thandi Shongwe	ANC
Vusi Shongwe	ANC
Lindiwe Sithole	ANC
Violet Siwela	ANC
Piet Simon Skhosana	ANC
