= List of members of the 5th Mpumalanga Provincial Legislature =

5th Mpumalanga Provincial Legislature
←	4th Legislature	6th Legislature	→

Overview
- Legislative body: Mpumalanga Provincial Legislature
- Jurisdiction: Mpumalanga, South Africa
- Term: 21 May 2014 – May 2019
- Election: 7 May 2014
- Members: 30
- Speaker: Thandi Shongwe (2014–2018); Violet Siwela (2018–2019)
- Deputy Speaker: David Dube (2014–2018); Bonakele Majuba (2018–2019)
- Premier: David Mabuza (2014–2018) Refilwe Mtsweni (2018–2019)

This is a list of members of the fifth Mpumalanga Provincial Legislature, as elected in the election of 7 May 2014. The African National Congress (ANC) retained a comfortable majority of 24 seats in the legislature but, for the first time since the legislature was established in 1994, its majority was diminished from the previous legislative session. The Democratic Alliance remained the largest opposition party in the legislature with three seats. The Congress of the People lost its representation in the legislature, while two new parties entered: the Economic Freedom Fighters won two seats, and the Bushbuckridge Residents Association won one seat.

Members were sworn in to their seats during the legislature's first sitting on 21 May 2014. In the same sitting, the legislature re-elected David Mabuza as Premier of Mpumalanga; he became the first person to be elected to a second term in that office. He announced a reconfigured Executive Council after his inauguration on 29 May. Thandi Shongwe was elected as Speaker of the Mpumalanga Provincial Legislature and David Dube was re-elected as Deputy Speaker.

On the evening of 26 February 2018, recently elected President Cyril Ramaphosa announced that Mabuza would be appointed as Deputy President of South Africa. Mabuza resigned from the provincial legislature the following day. Refilwe Mtsweni was acting Premier until 20 March 2018, when she was elected to fill the office permanently. Because Shongwe was appointed to Mtsweni's Executive Council, the legislature elected new presiding officers on 22 March: Violet Siwela was elected as Speaker and Bonakele Majuba was elected as her deputy.

== Composition ==
Representation of parties
Party	Seats
African National Congress	24
Democratic Alliance	3
Economic Freedom Fighters	2
Bushbuckridge Residents Association	1
Total	30

== Members ==
This is a list of members of the Mpumalanga Provincial Legislature as elected on 7 May 2014. It does not take into account changes in membership after the election.

Membership as elected in 2014
Member	Party
Anthony Maximilian Benadie	DA
David Dube	ANC
Andries Gamede	ANC
Bosman Grobler	DA
Eric Kholwane	ANC
David Mabuza	ANC
William Thulare Madileng	ANC
Norah Mahlangu	ANC
Sibusiso Malaza	ANC
Gillion Mashego	ANC
Rhoda Sazi Mathabe	ANC
Cleopas Maunye	BRA
Reginah Mhaule	ANC
Johanne Musa Mkhatshwa	ANC
Nomsa Mtsweni	ANC
Refilwe Mtsweni	ANC
Jeaneth Nghondzweni	ANC
Patricia Ngobeni	ANC
Pat Ngomane	ANC
Dumisile Nhlengethwa	ANC
Basani Violet Nkuna	ANC
Collen Sedibe	EFF
Gabisile Shabalala	ANC
Thandi Shongwe	ANC
Vusi Shongwe	ANC
Jane Sithole	DA
Violet Siwela	ANC
Piet Simon Skhosana	ANC
Ayanda Charlotte Tshabalala	EFF
Victor Vusumuzi Zibuthe Windvoël	ANC
