= List of members of the 6th Mpumalanga Provincial Legislature =

6th Mpumalanga Provincial Legislature
←	5th Legislature	7th Legislature	→

Overview
- Legislative body: Mpumalanga Provincial Legislature
- Jurisdiction: Mpumalanga, South Africa
- Meeting place: Mbombela
- Term: 22 May 2019 – 28 May 2024
- Election: 8 May 2019
- Members: 30
- Speaker: Makhosazane Masilela
- Deputy Speaker: Jeaneth Thabethe
- Premier: Refilwe Mtsweni-Tsipane
- Leader of the Opposition: Collen Sedibe

This is a list of members of the sixth Mpumalanga Provincial Legislature, as elected in the election of 8 May 2019 and taking into account changes in membership since the election. The legislative session dissolved on 28 May 2024 ahead of the 2024 national and provincial elections and was succeeded by the 7th legislature.

== Current composition ==
Party	Seats
African National Congress	22
Economic Freedom Fighters	4
DA	3
VF+	1
Total	30

== Graphical representation ==
This is a graphical comparison of party strengths as they are in the 6th Mpumalanga Provincial Legislature.

- Note this is not the official seating plan of the Mpumalanga Provincial Legislature.

== Members ==
Name	Party	Position
Bosman Grobler	DA	Member
Trudie Grove-Morgan	DA	Member
Nompumelelo Hlophe	ANC	Member
Mohita Latchminarain	ANC	Member
Bheki Lubisi	ANC	Member
Norah Mahlangu	ANC	Member
Bonakele Majuba	ANC	Member
Million Makaringe	ANC	Member
Sasekani Manzini	ANC	Member
Gillion Mashego	ANC	Member
Speedy Mashilo	ANC	Member
Makhosazane Masilela	ANC	Member
Ntsako Mkhabela	EFF	Member
Vusi Mkhatshwa	ANC	Member
Fidel Mlombo	ANC	Member
Mandla Msibi	ANC	Member
Refilwe Mtsweni-Tsipane	ANC	Premier
Gcina Mofokeng	EFF	Member
Pat Ngomane	ANC	Member
Lindiwe Ntshalintshali	ANC	Member
Nomshado Nyembe	EFF	Member
Michael Sedibe	EFF	Leader of the Opposition
Gabisile Tshabalala	ANC	Member
Busisiwe Shiba	ANC	Member
Thandi Shongwe	ANC	Member
Vusi Shongwe	ANC	Member
Jane Sithole	DA	Member
Jeaneth Thabethe	ANC	Member
Werner Weber	FF+	Member
