= List of members of the 2nd Mpumalanga Provincial Legislature =

2nd Mpumalanga Provincial Legislature
| ← | 1st Legislature | 3rd Legislature | → |

Overview
- Legislative body: Mpumalanga Provincial Legislature
- Jurisdiction: Mpumalanga, South Africa
- Term: June 1999 – April 2004
- Election: 2 June 1999
- Members: 30
- Speaker: William Lubisi
- Deputy Speaker: Pinky Phosa
- Premier: Ndaweni Mahlangu

This is a list of members of the second Mpumalanga Provincial Legislature, as elected in the election of 2 June 1999. The African National Congress (ANC) retained control of the legislature, winning 26 seats in the 30-seat legislature. Two parties, the Democratic Party and the United Democratic Movement, gained representation in the legislature for the first time, winning one seat each. The Freedom Front and New National Party retained a seat apiece.

The ANC's Ndaweni Mahlangu was elected as the second Premier of Mpumalanga. William Lubisi remained in his office as Speaker of the Mpumalanga Provincial Legislature, and he was deputised by Pinky Phosa. Lassy Chiwayo was Majority Chief Whip until mid-2001, when he was replaced by Jabu Mahlangu amid a major reshuffle of the ANC's caucus.

== Composition ==
Representation of parties
| Party | Seats |
|---|---|
| African National Congress | 26 |
| Democratic Party | 1 |
| Freedom Front | 1 |
| New National Party | 1 |
| United Democratic Movement | 1 |
| Total | 30 |

== Members ==
This is a list of members of the Mpumalanga Provincial Legislature as elected on 2 June 1999. It does not take into account changes in membership after the election.

Membership as elected in 1999
| Member | Party |
|---|---|
| Lassy Chiwayo | ANC |
| Mmathulare Coleman | ANC |
| Clive Winston Hatch | DP |
| William Lubisi | ANC |
| Jacob Mabena | ANC |
| Regalda Thoko Mabena | ANC |
| Jabulane Stephen Mabona | ANC |
| David Mabuza | ANC |
| Fish Mahlalela | ANC |
| James Mahlangu | UDM |
| Ndaweni Mahlangu | ANC |
| Refilwe Caroline Mahlobogoane | ANC |
| David Mickey Malatsi | NNP |
| Sibongile Manana | ANC |
| Siphosezwe Masango | ANC |
| Candith Mashego | ANC |
| January Boy Masilela | ANC |
| Hendrik Mentz | FF |
| Bushang Jacks Modipane | ANC |
| Jackson Mthembu | ANC |
| Zakhele Elphus Mthimkhulu | ANC |
| Wilson Mudau | ANC |
| Phumuzile Catherine Ngwenya | ANC |
| Boy Nobunga | ANC |
| Craig Novine Martin Padayachee | ANC |
| Pogisho Edwin Pasha | ANC |
| Pinky Phosa | ANC |
| Gelana Sarian Sindane | ANC |
| Bagudi Jonathan Tolo | ANC |
| Victor Vusumuzi Zibuthe Windvoel | ANC |
