= List of members of the 7th Mpumalanga Provincial Legislature =

This is a list of members of the 7th Mpumalanga Provincial Legislature, as elected in the 2024 provincial election and taking into account membership changes.

== Members ==
Name	Parliamentary group	Position
Mandla Ndlovu	African National Congress	Premier
Makhosazane Masilela	African National Congress	Speaker
Sam Masango	African National Congress	Deputy Speaker
Fana Mlombo	African National Congress	Chairperson of Committees · Chairperson – Select Committee of Chairpersons
Desmond Moela	African National Congress	Deputy Chairperson of Committees · Chairperson – Select Committee on Public Accounts (SCOPA)
Speedy Mashilo	African National Congress	MEC - Cooperative Governance, Human Settlements and Traditional Affairs & Leader of Government Business
Sasekani Manzini	African National Congress	MEC - Health
Bonakele Majuba	African National Congress	MEC - Provincial Treasury
Nompumelelo Hlophe	African National Congress	MEC - Social Development
Thulasizwe Thomo	African National Congress	MEC - Public Works, Roads and Transport
Jackie Macie	African National Congress	MEC - Community Safety, Security and Liaison
Lindi Masina	African National Congress	MEC - Education
Brenda Moeketsi	African National Congress	MEC - Agriculture, Rural Development and Environmental Affairs
Leah Mabuza	African National Congress	MEC - Culture, Sport and Recreation
Jesta Sidell	African National Congress	MEC - Economic Development and Tourism
Eva Makhabane	African National Congress	Chief Whip of the Majority Party (ANC)
Daniel Nkosi	African National Congress	Chairperson – Portfolio Committee on Co-operative Governance, Human Settlements & Traditional Affairs
Thulisile Khoza	African National Congress	Chairperson – Portfolio Committee on Education
Sipho Mahlangu	African National Congress	Chairperson – Select Committee on Public Participation, Petitions & Members’ Legislative Proposals
Cathy Dlamini	African National Congress	Chairperson – Portfolio Committee on Finance
Lucky Mbuyane	African National Congress	Chairperson – Portfolio Committee on Economic Development and Tourism
Life Monini	African National Congress	Chairperson – Portfolio Committee on Community Safety, Security & Liaison
Sonto Malepeng	African National Congress	Chairperson – Portfolio Committee on Public Works, Roads & Transport
Thabile Mavimbela	African National Congress	Member of the MPL
Munene Nhluvuko Mhlongo	African National Congress	Chairperson – Portfolio Committee on Health
Tshidiso Nkonyane	African National Congress	Chairperson – Portfolio Committee on Social Development
Stephens Sekoakoa	African National Congress	Member – Economic Development & Tourism
Benjamin Nxumayo	uMkhonto weSizwe Party	Leader of MKP
Tshepo Sikhosana	uMkhonto weSizwe Party	Chief Whip of Opposition
Joshua Lukhele	uMkhonto weSizwe Party	Member of the MPL
Jabulani Mdhluli	uMkhonto weSizwe Party	Member of the MPL
Mias Fenyane	uMkhonto weSizwe Party	Member of the MPL
Pekky Shongwe	uMkhonto weSizwe Party	Member of the MPL
Gabeni Ndimande	uMkhonto weSizwe Party	Member of the MPL
Nomaqhawe Bungane-Mtshweni	uMkhonto weSizwe Party	Member of the MPL
Busisiwe Mkhwebane	uMkhonto weSizwe Party	Member of the MPL
Collen Sedibe	Economic Freedom Fighters	Chairperson – Portfolio Committee on Agriculture, Rural Development, Land & Environmental Affairs
Jackson Malatjie	Economic Freedom Fighters	Chairperson – Select Committee on Women, Youth, Children & People with Disabilities
Ntsako Mkhabela	Economic Freedom Fighters	Member of the MPL
Micheal Ngwenya	Economic Freedom Fighters	Member of the MPL
Nomaswazi Nkambule	Economic Freedom Fighters	Member of the MPL
Rhulani Chibi	Economic Freedom Fighters	Member of the MPL
Nkateko Ndlovu	Economic Freedom Fighters	Member of the MPL
Bosman Grobler	Democratic Alliance	Chairperson – Portfolio Committee on Culture, Sports & Recreation
Trudie Grové-Morgan	Democratic Alliance	Chairperson – Oversight Committee on Legislature & Premier's Office
James Masango	Democratic Alliance	Member of the MPL
Teboho Sekaledi	Democratic Alliance	Member of the MPL
Annerie Weber	Democratic Alliance	Member of the MPL
Werner Weber	Freedom Front Plus	Member of the MPL
Thoko Mashiane	ActionSA	Member of the MPL

== Membership changes ==
On the government benches, African National Congress MPL Mandla Msibi resigned from the provincial legislature on 30 July 2024. Life Monini was sworn in to fill the casual vacancy arising from his resignation.

On the opposition side, Mary Phadi was expelled from the uMkhonto weSizwe Party and ceased to be a member of the provincial legislature in July 2025. Her seat was filled by Busisiwe Mkhwebane.

Democratic Alliance member Tersia Marshall died on 16 July 2026; the party will select her replacement from the party list.
