= Politics of Mpumalanga =

Politics in a South African region

As a province of South Africa, Mpumalanga is governed through a parliamentary system of government. From 1994 to the present, the African National Congress (ANC) has been the leading political party in Mpumalanga. Currently, the Economic Freedom Fighters (EFF), followed by the Democratic Alliance (DA) are the biggest opposition parties. The most recent elections were held with South Africa's general elections on 8 May 2019

== Executive ==
Since 2018, Refilwe Mtsweni-Tsipane, a member of the African National Congress, has held the office of the premier of Mpumalanga. The premier appoints ten members of the Mpumalanga Provincial Legislature to be on the Executive Council.

=== Mpumalanga Executive Council ===
Portfolio	MEC
Premier	Mandla Ndlovu
Community Safety, Security, and Liaison	Khensane Macie
Education	Cathy Dlamini
Social Development	Khethiwe Moeketsi
Economic Development and Tourism	Makhosazane Masilela
Agriculture, Rural Development, Land and Environmental Affairs	Nompumelelo Hlophe
Public Works, Roads, and Transport	Thulasizwe Thomo
Finance	Bonakele Majuba
Culture, Sport, and Recreation	Leah Mabuza
Health	Sasekani Manzini
Human Settlements and Co-Operative Governance and Traditional Affairs	Speedy Mashilo

== Legislative ==
The legislative functions of the provincial government are carried out by the Mpumalanga Provincial Legislature, which elects the leader of the largest party or coalition in the legislature as the premier of the province.

== See also ==
- Mpumalanga (National Assembly of South Africa constituency)
- Premier of Mpumalanga
- Mpumalanga Provincial Legislature
