= Executive Council of Mpumalanga =

Provincial government in South Africa

The Executive Council of Mpumalanga is the cabinet of the executive branch of the provincial government in the South African province of Mpumalanga. The Members of the Executive Council (MECs) are appointed from among the members of the Mpumalanga Provincial Legislature by the Premier of Mpumalanga, an office held since June 2024 by Mandla Ndlovu.

== Makwetla premiership: 2004–2009 ==
On 3 May 2004, Thabang Makwetla, who was elected Premier of Mpumalanga in the 2004 general election, announced his new Executive Council. Cabinet reshuffles were announced in January 2005 and February 2007. A final, major reshuffle was announced in May 2008, after the 52nd National Conference of the governing African National Congress (ANC) and ahead of the provincial elective conference of the ANC in Mpumalanga.

Mpumalanga Executive Council 2004–2009
Post	Member	Term		Party
Premier of Mpumalanga	Thabang Makwetla	2004	2009	ANC
MEC for Finance	Jabu Mahlangu	2008	2009	ANC
MEC for Finance	Mmathulare Coleman	2004	2008	ANC
MEC for Health and Social Development	Fish Mahlalela	2008	2009	ANC
MEC for Health and Social Development	William Lubisi	2007	2008	ANC
MEC for Health and Social Development	Pogisho Pasha	2005	2007	ANC
MEC for Health and Social Development	William Lubisi	2004	2005	ANC
MEC for Education	Mmathulare Coleman	2008	2009	ANC
MEC for Education	Siphosezwe Masango	2004	2008	ANC
MEC for Economic Development and Planning	Craig Padayachee	2007	2009	ANC
MEC for Economic Development and Planning	William Lubisi	2005	2007	ANC
MEC for Economic Development and Planning	Jacob Mabena	2004	2005	ANC
MEC for Agriculture and Land Administration	David Mabuza	2008	2009	ANC
MEC for Agriculture and Land Administration	Dina Pule	2007	2008	ANC
MEC for Agriculture and Land Administration	Madala Masuku	2005	2007	ANC
MEC for Agriculture and Land Administration	Nomsa Mtsweni	2004	2005	ANC
MEC for Public Works	Madala Masuku	2007	2009	ANC
MEC for Public Works	Candith Mashego-Dlamini	2004	2007	ANC
MEC for Roads and Transport	Jackson Mthembu	2008	2009	ANC
MEC for Roads and Transport	David Mabuza	2007	2008	ANC
MEC for Roads and Transport	Fish Mahlalela	2004	2007	ANC
MEC for Local Government and Housing	Candith Mashego-Dlamini	2007	2009	ANC
MEC for Local Government and Housing	Jabu Mahlangu	2004	2007	ANC
MEC for Safety and Security	Siphosezwe Masango	2008	2009	ANC
MEC for Safety and Security	Fish Mahlalela	2007	2008	ANC
MEC for Safety and Security	Dina Pule	2005	2007	ANC
MEC for Safety and Security	Pogisho Pasha	2004	2005	ANC
MEC for Culture, Sport and Recreation	Dina Pule	2008	2009	ANC
MEC for Culture, Sport and Recreation	Jabu Mahlangu	2007	2008	ANC
MEC for Culture, Sport and Recreation	Nomsa Mtsweni	2005	2007	ANC
MEC for Culture, Sport and Recreation	Madala Masuku	2004	2005	ANC

== Mabuza premiership: 2009-2018 ==
=== First term: 2009–2014 ===
On 12 May 2009, after his election in the 2009 general election, new Mpumalanga Premier David Mabuza announced his new Executive Council, including the restructuring of the local government and housing portfolio and the merger of the public works portfolio with roads and transport. His first reshuffle was announced on 3 November 2010, and on 19 July 2011 he announced that the MEC for Public Works, Roads and Transport, Clifford Mkasi, would swap portfolios with the MEC for Health and Social Development, Dikeledi Mahlangu. On 18 February 2013, in another reshuffle, Mabuza fired Mkasi and two other MECs, Siphosezwe Masango and Norman Mokoena.

Mpumalanga Executive Council 2009–2014
Post	Member	Term		Party
Premier of Mpumalanga	David Mabuza	2009	2014	ANC
MEC for Finance	Madala Masuku	2013	2014	ANC
MEC for Finance	Pinky Phosa	2009	2013	ANC
MEC for Health and Social Development	Candith Mashego-Dlamini	2013	2014	ANC
MEC for Health and Social Development	Clifford Mkasi	2011	2013	ANC
MEC for Health and Social Development	Dikeledi Mahlangu	2009	2011	ANC
MEC for Education	Reginah Mhaule	2009	2014	ANC
MEC for Economic Development and Planning	Pinky Phosa	2013	2014	ANC
MEC for Economic Development and Planning	Norman Mokoena	2010	2013	ANC
MEC for Economic Development, Environment and Tourism	Jabu Mahlangu	2009	2010	ANC
MEC for Agriculture, Rural Development and Land Administration	Violet Siwela	2013	2014	ANC
MEC for Agriculture, Rural Development and Land Administration	Candith Mashego-Dlamini	2010	2013	ANC
MEC for Agriculture, Rural Development and Land Administration	Meshack Malinga	2009	2010	ANC
MEC for Public Works, Roads and Transport	Dikeledi Mahlangu	2011	2014	ANC
MEC for Public Works, Roads and Transport	Clifford Mkasi	2009	2011	ANC
MEC for Human Settlements	Andries Gamede	2013	2014	ANC
MEC for Human Settlements	Siphosezwe Masango	2010	2013	ANC
MEC for Human Settlements	Madala Masuku	2009	2010	ANC
MEC for Community Safety, Security and Liaison	Vusi Shongwe	2010	2014	ANC
MEC for Community Safety, Security and Liaison	Sibongile Manana	2009	2010	ANC
MEC for Cooperative Governance and Traditional Affairs	Simon Sikhosana	2013	2014	ANC
MEC for Cooperative Governance and Traditional Affairs	Madala Masuku	2010	2013	ANC
MEC for Cooperative Governance and Traditional Affairs	Norman Mokoena	2009	2010	ANC
MEC for Culture, Sport and Recreation	Sibongile Manana	2010	2014	ANC
MEC for Culture, Sport and Recreation	Vusi Shongwe	2009	2010	ANC

=== Second term: 2014–2018 ===
On 30 May 2014, after his re-election in the 2014 general election, Mabuza announced his new Executive Council, restructuring several departments. In August 2016, after the 2016 local government elections, he announced a reshuffle.

Mpumalanga Executive Council 2014–2018
Post	Member	Term		Party
Premier of Mpumalanga	David Mabuza	2014	2018	ANC
MEC for Finance, Economic Development and Tourism	Eric Kholwane	2014	2018	ANC
MEC for Health	Gillion Mashego	2014	2018	ANC
MEC for Education	Reginah Mhaule	2014	2018	ANC
MEC for Agriculture, Rural Development, Land and Environmental Affairs	Vusi Shongwe	2016	2018	ANC
MEC for Agriculture, Rural Development, Land and Environmental Affairs	Andries Gamede	2014	2016	ANC
MEC for Public Works, Roads and Transport	Sasekani Manzini	2016	2018	ANC
MEC for Public Works, Roads and Transport	Dumisile Nhlengethwa	2014	2016	ANC
MEC for Human Settlements	Speedy Mashilo	2016	2018	ANC
MEC for Human Settlements	Violet Siwela	2014	2016	ANC
MEC for Community Safety, Security and Liaison	Pat Ngomane	2016	2018	ANC
MEC for Community Safety, Security and Liaison	Vusi Shongwe	2014	2016	ANC
MEC for Cooperative Governance and Traditional Affairs	Refilwe Mtsweni	2014	2018	ANC
MEC for Social Development	Busisiwe Shiba	2016	2018	ANC
MEC for Social Development	Nomsa Mtsweni	2014	2016	ANC
MEC for Culture, Sport and Recreation	Norah Mahlangu	2014	2018	ANC

== Mtsweni-Tsipane premiership: 2018-2024 ==
=== First term: 2018–present ===
In March 2018, Refilwe Mtsweni-Tsipane was officially sworn in as Premier, replacing David Mabuza, who had become Deputy President of South Africa; Mtsweni-Tsipane announced a reshuffle shortly after her inauguration. In July 2017, Mtsweni-Tsipane announced that Health MEC Gillion Mashego would swop portfolios with Public Works MEC Sasekani Manzini; the announcement followed protests by the National Education, Health and Allied Workers' Union, which called for Mashego's dismissal.

Mpumalanga Executive Council 2018–2019
Post	Member	Term		Party
Premier of Mpumalanga	Refilwe Mtsweni-Tsipane	2018	2019	ANC
MEC for Finance, Economic Development and Tourism	Eric Kholwane	2018	2019	ANC
MEC for Health	Sasekani Manzini	2018	2019	ANC
MEC for Health	Gillion Mashego	2018	2018	ANC
MEC for Education	Sibusiso Malaza	2018	2019	ANC
MEC for Agriculture, Rural Development, Land and Environmental Affairs	Vusi Shongwe	2018	2019	ANC
MEC for Public Works, Roads and Transport	Gillion Mashego	2018	2019	ANC
MEC for Public Works, Roads and Transport	Sasekani Manzini	2018	2018	ANC
MEC for Human Settlements	Norah Mahlangu	2018	2019	ANC
MEC for Community Safety, Security and Liaison	Pat Ngomane	2018	2019	ANC
MEC for Cooperative Governance and Traditional Affairs	Speedy Mashilo	2018	2019	ANC
MEC for Social Development	Busisiwe Shiba	2018	2019	ANC
MEC for Culture, Sport and Recreation	Thandi Shongwe	2018	2019	ANC

=== Second term: 2019–2024 ===
In the 2019 general election, Premier Mtsweni-Tsipane was elected to a full term as Premier and on 28 May 2019 she announced her new Executive Council. On 24 February 2021, she announced a reshuffle which removed four MECs, all viewed as political supporters of former Premier Mabuza. In October 2021, she also fired Mandla Msibi as MEC for Agriculture, Rural Development and Land Administration; Busisiwe Shiba, the MEC for Corporate Governance and Traditional Affairs, took over Msibi's portfolio in an acting capacity and then permanently in May 2022. Msibi returned to the Executive Council in an October 2022 reshuffle, which saw two other MECs fired.

Mpumalanga Executive Council 2019–2024
Post	Member	Term		Party
Premier of Mpumalanga	Refilwe Mtsweni-Tsipane	2019	2024	ANC
MEC for Finance, Economic Development and Tourism	Mpumi Hlophe	2022	2024	ANC
MEC for Finance, Economic Development and Tourism	Vusi Mkhatshwa	2021	2022	ANC
MEC for Finance, Economic Development and Tourism	Pat Ngomane	2019	2021	ANC
MEC for Health	Sasekani Manzini	2019	2024	ANC
MEC for Education	Bonakele Majuba	2019	2024	ANC
MEC for Agriculture, Rural Development and Land Administration	Busisiwe Shiba	2022	2024	ANC
MEC for Agriculture, Rural Development and Land Administration	Mandla Msibi	2021	2021	ANC
MEC for Agriculture, Rural Development and Land Administration	Vusi Shongwe	2019	2021	ANC
MEC for Public Works, Roads and Transport	Mandla Ndlovu	2022	2024	ANC
MEC for Public Works, Roads and Transport	Mohita Latchminarain	2021	2022	ANC
MEC for Public Works, Roads and Transport	Gillion Mashego	2019	2021	ANC
MEC for Human Settlements	Speedy Mashilo	2021	2024	ANC
MEC for Human Settlements	Norah Mahlangu	2019	2021	ANC
MEC for Community Safety, Security and Liaison	Vusi Shongwe	2021	2024	ANC
MEC for Community Safety, Security and Liaison	Gabisile Tshabalala	2019	2021	ANC
MEC for Cooperative Governance and Traditional Affairs	Mandla Msibi	2022	2024	ANC
MEC for Cooperative Governance and Traditional Affairs	Mandla Ndlovu	2022	2022	ANC
MEC for Cooperative Governance and Traditional Affairs	Busisiwe Shiba	2021	2022	ANC
MEC for Cooperative Governance and Traditional Affairs	Mandla Msibi	2019	2021	ANC
MEC for Social Development	Lindiwe Ntshalintshali	2021	2024	ANC
MEC for Social Development	Thandi Shongwe	2019	2021	ANC
MEC for Arts, Sports, Culture and Recreation	Thandi Shongwe	2021	2024	ANC
MEC for Arts, Sports, Culture and Recreation	Lindiwe Ntshalintshali	2019	2021	ANC

== Ndlovu premiership: 2024–present ==
Following the 2024 general election, ANC provincial chairperson Mandla Ndlovu was installed as the new premier of the province, succeeding Refilwe Mtsweni-Tsipane. He named his executive council following his inauguration on 18 June 2024. On 4 September 2024, Ndlovu appointed Leah Mabuza to the executive council following the resignation of the MEC for Culture, Sport, and Recreation, Fidel Mlombo.

Mpumalanga Executive Council 2024–present
Post	Member	Term		Party
Premier of Mpumalanga	Mandla Ndlovu	2024	Incumbent	ANC
MEC for Community Safety, Security, and Liaison	Jackie Macie	2024	Incumbent	ANC
MEC for Education	Cathy Dlamini	2024	Incumbent	ANC
MEC for Social Development	Khethiwe Moeketsi	2024	Incumbent	ANC
MEC for Economic Development and Tourism	Makhosazane Masilela	2024	Incumbent	ANC
MEC for Agriculture, Rural Development, Land and Environmental Affairs	Nompumelelo Hlophe	2024	Incumbent	ANC
MEC for Public Works, Roads and Transport	Thulasizwe Thomo	2024	Incumbent	ANC
MEC for Finance	Bonakele Majuba	2024	Incumbent	ANC
MEC for Culture, Sport, and Recreation	Leah Mabuza	2024	Incumbent	ANC
MEC for Culture, Sport, and Recreation	Fidel Mlombo	2024	2024	
MEC for Health	Sasekani Manzini	2024	Incumbent	ANC
MEC for Human Settlements and Co-Operative Governance and Traditional Affairs	Speedy Mashilo	2024	Incumbent	ANC

== See also ==
- Template:Mpumalanga Executive Council
- Government of South Africa
- Constitution of South Africa
