= Dikeledi Mahlangu =

South African politician

The Honourable Dikeledi Mahlangu MP

Delegate to the National Council of Provinces
- Incumbent
- Assumed office 23 May 2019
- Constituency: Mpumalanga

Member of the National Assembly
- In office 21 May 2014 – 7 May 2019

Member of the Mpumalanga Executive Council for Public Works, Roads and Transport
- In office July 2011 – May 2014
- Premier: David Mabuza
- Preceded by: Clifford Mkasi
- Succeeded by: Dumisile Nhlengethwa

Member of the Mpumalanga Executive Council for Health and Social Development
- In office May 2009 – July 2011
- Premier: David Mabuza
- Preceded by: Fish Mahlalela
- Succeeded by: Clifford Mkasi

Personal details
- Citizenship: South Africa
- Party: African National Congress

Dikeledi Gladys Mahlangu is a South African politician who is currently serving as Chairperson of the Select Committee on Appropriations in the National Council of Provinces. She formerly represented her party, the African National Congress, in the National Assembly from 2014 to 2019. Before that, she was a Member of the Mpumalanga Provincial Legislature and from 2009 to 2014 she served in the Mpumalanga Executive Council under Premier David Mabuza.

== Political career ==
In the 1990s, Mahlangu was a local leader of the African National Congress (ANC) and National Education, Health and Allied Workers' Union in KwaMhlanga in Mpumalanga. She is also a member of the ANC Women's League. In the 2009 general election, she was elected to a seat in the Mpumalanga Provincial Legislature. She was also appointed to the Mpumalanga Executive Council by David Mabuza, the newly elected Premier of Mpumalanga, who made her Member of the Executive Council (MEC) for Health and Social Development. On 19 July 2011, Mabuza announced that Mahlangu would swop portfolios with Clifford Mkasi, becoming MEC for Public Works, Roads and Transport. While she was in that portfolio, in 2012, Mahlangu was elected for the first time to the Provincial Executive Committee of the ANC's Mpumalanga branch.

Mahlangu left the provincial legislature and Executive Council after the 2014 general election, in which she was elected to the National Assembly, ranked 64th on the ANC's national party list. After a full legislative term in the National Assembly, Mahlangu was elected to the National Council of Provinces (NCOP) in the 2019 general election. The ANC also announced that it would nominate her to chair the NCOP's Select Committee on Appropriations. She was elected Chairperson on 2 July 2019, and also in July was elected Co-Chairperson of Parliament's Joint Standing Committee on the Financial Management of Parliament.
