= Violet Siwela =

South African politician (1956–2024)

The Honourable Violet Siwela

Chairperson of the Portfolio Committee on Small Business Development
- In office 2 July 2019 – 18 January 2024
- Preceded by: Ruth Bhengu

Member of the National Assembly
- In office 22 May 2019 – 18 January 2024
- Succeeded by: Nuraan Muller

Deputy Provincial Chairperson of the Mpumalanga African National Congress
- In office December 2015 – December 2017
- Chairperson: David Mabuza
- Preceded by: David Dube
- Succeeded by: Speedy Mashilo
Other provincial offices 2005–2019
Speaker of the Mpumalanga Provincial Legislature
In office 22 March 2018 – 7 May 2019
Deputy	Bonakele Majuba
Preceded by	Thandi Shongwe
Succeeded by	Busisiwe Shiba
Member of the Mpumalanga Executive Council for Human Settlements
In office 30 May 2014 – 17 August 2016
Premier	David Mabuza
Preceded by	Andries Gamede
Succeeded by	Speedy Mashilo
Member of the Mpumalanga Executive Council for Agriculture, Rural Development and Land Administration
In office 18 February 2013 – 30 May 2014
Premier	David Mabuza
Preceded by	Candith Mashego-Dlamini
Succeeded by	Andries Gamede
Member of the Mpumalanga Provincial Legislature
In office 2005 – 7 May 2019

Personal details
- Born: 26 April 1956 Bushbuckridge, Transvaal; Union of South Africa
- Died: 18 January 2024 (aged 67)
- Party: African National Congress

Violet Sizani Siwela (26 April 1956 – 18 January 2024) was a South African politician from Mpumalanga. She was a Member of the National Assembly, where she chaired the Portfolio Committee on Small Business Development, and a member of the National Executive Committee of the African National Congress (ANC). She served in the Mpumalanga Provincial Legislature until May 2019.

Born in Bushbuckridge, Siwela spent almost three decades as a teacher and primary school principal in Mpumalanga. She entered politics as a Ward Councillor for the ANC in the Bushbuckridge Local Municipality in 2000 and joined the provincial legislature in 2005. Between 2005 and 2019, she held a range of positions in the legislature, including as a member of the Mpumalanga Executive Council under Premier David Mabuza: she was Member of the Executive Council for Agriculture from 2013 to 2014 and Member of the Executive Council for Human Settlements from 2014 to 2016. Later, she served as Speaker of the Mpumalanga Provincial Legislature from March 2018 until May 2019. She was elected to the National Assembly in the 2019 general election.

Inside her political party, Siwela deputised Mabuza as Deputy Provincial Chairperson of the Mpumalanga ANC from December 2015 until December 2017, when the ANC's 54th National Conference elected her to the party's National Executive Committee. She was re-elected to a second five-year term on the committee in December 2022. She also served on the national executive of the ANC Women's League.

== Early life and education ==
Siwela was born on 26th April 1956 in Bushbuckridge in the former Transvaal Province. She completed a teaching certificate at Hoxane College of Education in Hazyview in 1980, and she later studied at university, completing a Master of Business Administration at Azaliah College in 2003.

== Early career ==
From 1977 to 2005, Siwela was a teacher in Bushbuckridge. During that period, she was the principal of Bushbuckridge's Ludlow Primary School from 1993 to 2005. At the same time, from 2000 to 2005, she represented the African National Congress (ANC) as a ward councillor and Member of the Mayoral Committee in Bushbuckridge Local Municipality.

== Mpumalanga Provincial Legislature: 2005–2019 ==
In 2005, Siwela was sworn in to the Mpumalanga Provincial Legislature, where she filled a casual vacancy in the ANC's caucus. She served as the ANC's chief whip until the April 2009 general election, after which she was elected as Deputy Speaker of the Mpumalanga Provincial Legislature. She deputised Jackson Mthembu and then William Lubisi, who succeeded Mthembu as Speaker later in 2009. During her term as Deputy Speaker, she chaired the women's caucus in the provincial legislature.

Siwela also continued to rise through the ranks of the ANC. In 2008, she was elected both to the National Executive Committee of the ANC Women's League and to the Provincial Executive Committee of the party's Mpumalanga branch. In April 2012, she was elected as the ANC's Deputy Provincial Secretary in Mpumalanga, serving under Provincial Chairperson David Mabuza and Provincial Secretary Lucky Ndinisa.

=== MEC for Agriculture: 2013–2014 ===
On 18th February 2013, Siwela was appointed to the Executive Council of Mpumalanga by Mabuza, who was then in his first term as Premier of Mpumalanga. He named her to succeed Candith Mashego-Dlamini as Member of the Executive Council (MEC) for Agriculture, Rural Development and Land Administration. The opposition Democratic Alliance, criticising various aspects of the reshuffle, said that its "greatest concern" was the appointment of Siwela, whom it considered "a weak leader". According to the party, Siwela's appointment was "surely a reward for securing Premier Mabuza's support with ANC structures in the Bushbuckridge region" and "signals a sad day for the agricultural sector in Mpumalanga – a sector in which she has little or no knowledge, or sentiment."

=== MEC for Human Settlements: 2014–2016 ===
Ahead of the May 2014 general election, the ANC Provincial Executive Committee submitted Siwela as one of three possible candidates to stand as the party's candidate for election as Premier, though Mabuza was presumed likely to be re-elected. Pursuant to the election, Siwela was re-elected to the provincial legislature, ranked sixth on the ANC's provincial party list, and Mabuza appointed her to his second-term Executive Council as MEC for Human Settlements; she traded portfolios with Andries Gamede. Upon assuming office, she said that she would seek to involve her department in job creation, skills development, and public–private partnership.

During this period, at the ANC's next provincial elective conference at Mbombela Stadium in December 2015, Siwela's term as ANC Deputy Provincial Secretary expired. Instead of standing for re-election, she stood for – and won – election as Deputy Provincial Chairperson, serving under Mabuza, who was re-elected to his third term as Provincial Chairperson. She succeeded David Dube in that position.

At the same time, she remained in the Human Settlements portfolio until 17 August 2016, when Mabuza announced a reshuffle in the aftermath of recent local government elections. Siwela was sacked from the Executive Council, to be replaced by Speedy Mashilo, and became an ordinary Member of the Provincial Legislature.

=== Nasrec conference: 2017 ===
In December 2017, Siwela attended the ANC's 54th National Conference at Nasrec, where she was elected to a five-year term as a member of the party's National Executive Committee. By number of votes received, she was ranked seventh of the 80 ordinary members elected to the committee.

Because she had been elected to national party office, the ANC's constitution required Siwela to step down as Deputy Provincial Chairperson in Mpumalanga. The party said that an acting replacement would be appointed until the next provincial party elections. A permanent replacement for Siwela was not elected until April 2022, when Speedy Mashilo became Deputy Provincial Chairperson.

=== Speaker of the Mpumalanga Legislature: 2018–2019 ===
In the aftermath of the ANC's national conference, Mabuza was promoted to become Deputy President of South Africa. He was replaced as Premier by Refilwe Mtsweni, who reshuffled the provincial cabinet. As a result of the reshuffle, the Mpumalanga Provincial Legislature elected new presiding officers on 22 March 2018, electing Siwela to succeed Thandi Shongwe as the Speaker. Bonakele Majuba was elected as her deputy. Siwela served in the Speaker's office until the May 2019 general election, when Busisiwe Shiba was elected to succeed her.

== National Assembly: 2019–2024 ==
In the 2019 election, Siwela did not stand for re-election to the provincial legislature; instead, she was sworn in to a seat in the National Assembly, the lower house of the South African Parliament. She was ranked 51st on the ANC's national party list. On 2 July 2019, she was elected unopposed as the chairperson of Parliament's Portfolio Committee on Small Business Development, which shadows the Ministry of Small Business Development. She was also appointed to the Section 194 Enquiry into the Public Protector, Busisiwe Mkhwebane; however, in June 2023, she recused herself from the enquiry in order to avoid bias in dealing with a related complaint laid by Mkhwebane in the Joint Committee on Ethics and Members' Interests, of which Siwela was also a member.

In December 2022, at the ANC's 55th National Conference, Siwela was narrowly re-elected to another five-year term on the ANC National Executive Committee. She received 969 votes across about 4,000 ballots, meaning that she was ranked 79th of the committee's 80 elected members.

== Death ==
Violet Siwela died on 18 January 2024, at the age of 67. She was replaced in Parliament by Nuraan Muller.

== See also ==
- List of members of the National Assembly of South Africa who died in office
