= Pinky Phosa =

South African politician (born 1956)

Member of the National Assembly of South Africa
- In office 21 May 2014 – 7 May 2019
- Constituency: Mpumalanga

Mpumalanga MEC for Economic Development, Environment and Tourism
- In office 19 February 2013 – 7 May 2014
- Premier: David Mabuza
- Preceded by: Norman Mokoena
- Succeeded by: Eric Kholwane

Mpumalanga MEC for Finance
- In office 12 May 2009 – 18 February 2013
- Premier: David Mabuza
- Preceded by: Jabu Mahlangu
- Succeeded by: Madala Masuku

Speaker of the Mpumalanga Provincial Legislature
- In office May 2004 – 5 May 2009
- Preceded by: Sipho William Lubisi
- Succeeded by: Jackson Mthembu

Member of the Mpumalanga Provincial Legislature
- In office 1999–2014

Personal details
- Born: 4 September 1956 (age 70)
- Party: African National Congress
- Spouse: Mathews Phosa
- Education: University of the North; Damelin Business School; UNISA; Wits Business School
- Profession: Politician

Yvonne Nkwenkwezi "Pinky" Phosa (born 4 September 1956) is a South African politician who served as a Member of the National Assembly for the African National Congress from 2014 until 2019. She was the chairperson of parliament's Standing Committee on Appropriations from 2016 until 2019. Before her election to Parliament, she served in the Mpumalanga provincial government. Phosa is married to former ANC treasurer-general and previous Mpumalanga premier Mathews Phosa.

== Early life and education ==
Phosa was born on 4 September 1956. She obtained a BA degree in social work from University of the North in 1990. In 1988, she studied at Damelin Business School and received a certificate in business management. She obtained her master's degree in public administration from the University of Pretoria in 1998. In 2006, Phosa achieved a certificate in public finance from the University of South Africa. From Wits Business School, she attained a certificate in governance and leadership in 2012 and a diploma in governance and leadership in 2013.

== Political career ==
Phosa is a member of the African National Congress. She served on the Nelspruit Transitional Council from 1993 until 1999. In the 1999 election, she was elected to the Mpumalanga Provincial Legislature. She was appointed deputy speaker of the legislature. She was promoted to speaker after the 2004 election. David Mabuza was elected the provincial premier in the April 2009 election. He selected Phosa to be the MEC (Member of the Executive Council) for Finance. He later moved her to the Economic Development, Environment and Tourism portfolio in February 2013.

Following the 2014 general election, Phosa was sworn in as a Member of the National Assembly. She was first the chairperson of the Portfolio Committee on Higher Education and Training before she was elected head of the Standing Committee on Appropriations in May 2016. Phosa was not selected as an ANC parliamentary candidate for the 2019 election. As a result, her last day as a parliamentarian was on 7 May 2019.

In March 2022, Phosa was appointed as South Africa's ambassador to Cuba and the Dominican Republic.

== Personal life ==
Phosa is married to Mathews Phosa, the former Premier of Mpumalanga and the former ANC treasurer-general. They had two daughters and a son together. Phosa's eldest daughter died in January 2020.
