= Andries Gamede =

South African politician (born 1964)

Member of the Mpumalanga Executive Council for Agriculture, Rural Development, Land and Environmental Affairs
- In office May 2014 – May 2019
- Premier: David Mabuza
- Preceded by: Violet Siwela
- Succeeded by: Vusi Shongwe

Member of the Mpumalanga Executive Council for Human Settlements
- In office February 2013 – May 2014
- Premier: David Mabuza
- Preceded by: Siphosezwe Masango
- Succeeded by: Violet Siwela

Personal details
- Born: 1964 (age 61–62) Nongoma, Natal; South Africa
- Party: ANC, MK
- Other political affiliations: Independent Community Movement Association

Mzikayifani Andries Gamede (born 1964) is a South African politician who served in the Mpumalanga Executive Council from February 2013 until May 2019, when he declined to stand for re-election to the Mpumalanga Provincial Legislature. A member of the African National Congress (ANC), he served as Member of the Executive Council (MEC) for Human Settlements from 2013 to 2014 and as MEC for Agriculture, Rural Development, Land and Environmental Affairs from 2014 to 2019. He is also a former mayor of Mkhondo Local Municipality and of Gert Sibande District Municipality, and he founded the Independent Community Movement Association, which is active in that region.

== Early life and career ==
Gamede was born in 1964 in Nongoma in the former Natal province. He entered politics through the apartheid-era trade union movement as an organiser for the Food Alliance Workers' Union in the Eastern Transvaal from 1989 to 1993. Thereafter, from 1993 to 1995, he served as Deputy Provincial General-Secretary of the South African National Civic Organisation (SANCO) in the region.

== Career in government ==
In 1996, Gamede became Mayor of the Piet Retief Local Municipality, later reconfigured as Mkhondo Local Municipality; he served two terms in that office. He also served one term, from 2007, as Executive Mayor of Gert Sibande District Municipality. During his time in local government, he was also active in the ANC and became a local leader in the party's branch in Gert Sibande region.

At a party elective conference in April 2012, Gamede was elected as Provincial Treasurer of the ANC's provincial branch in Mpumalanga, serving under Provincial Chairperson David Mabuza. In the following months, Gamede was sworn in as a Member of the Mpumalanga Provincial Legislature and then, on 18 February 2013, was appointed to the Mpumalanga Executive Council; Mabuza, in his capacity as Premier of Mpumalanga, named Gamede as Member of the Executive Council (MEC) for Human Settlements.

In the next general election in 2014, Gamede was elected to a full term in the Mpumalanga Provincial Legislature, ranked third on the ANC's provincial party list. Mabuza, who was re-elected as Premier, appointed Gamede as MEC for Agriculture, Rural Development, Land and Environmental Affairs in his second-term cabinet. He remained in that office until August 2016, when Mabuza announced a reshuffle which saw Gamede fired from the Executive Council and replaced by Vusi Shongwe. He served the remainder of the legislative term as an ordinary Member of the Provincial Legislature but did not stand for re-election in the 2019 general election.

In the 2021 local government elections, Gamede did not campaign for the ANC but for a civic organisation he founded, the Independent Community Movement Association, which fielded independent candidates for election to the Mkhondo council. He told News24 that he was still a member of the ANC and compared his organisation to SANCO, a close ANC ally which nonetheless fielded candidates against the ANC in local elections.

In January 2024 he joined uMkhonto we Sizwe.

== Personal life ==
Gamede is married to Zamagambu Memela.
