= Fidel Mlombo =

South African politician (born 1964)

Fidel Mlombo MPL

Member of the Mpumalanga Executive Council for Culture, Sports and Recreation
- In office 18 June 2024 – 4 September 2024
- Premier: Mandla Ndlovu
- Preceded by: Thandi Shongwe
- Succeeded by: Leah Mabuza

Member of the Mpumalanga Provincial Legislature
- Incumbent
- Assumed office 15 August 2016

Personal details
- Citizenship: South Africa
- Party: African National Congress
- Other political affiliations: South African Communist Party

Fana Vincent "Fidel" Mlombo (born 21 December 1964) is a South African politician and trade unionist who served as Mpumalanga's Member of the Executive Council (MEC) for Culture, Sports and Recreation from June until September 2024 and has represented the African National Congress (ANC) in the Mpumalanga Provincial Legislature since August 2016. He was formerly the Provincial Secretary of the Mpumalanga branch of the Congress of South African Trade Unions (COSATU) from 2009 to 2016, and he has also served in the provincial executive of the South African Communist Party (SACP).

== Trade union career ==
Mlombo entered politics in 1985 when he joined COSATU. He was active in the Paper, Printing, Wood, and Allied Workers' Union while working at a Sappi plant in Ngodwana, but he moved to the South African Commercial, Catering and Allied Workers Union in 1995 to become a provincial organiser for the union. In 2002, he joined COSATU as a provincial organiser. He was elected Provincial Secretary of COSATU Mpumalanga in 2009 and he remained in that position when he joined the provincial legislature in August 2016. At that time he was also a member of the Provincial Executive Committee of the SACP in Mpumalanga.

== Legislative career ==
In the legislature, Mlombo filled a casual vacancy that had arisen after the 2016 local government elections when Nomsa Mtsweni resigned to become Mayor of Thembisile Hani. He was sworn in on 15 August 2016. In the 2019 general election, he was elected to his first full term in the provincial legislature, ranked 13th on the ANC's provincial party list. As of 2022, he was the Majority Chief Whip in the provincial legislature, with Million Makaringe as his deputy.

Following the 2024 general election, Mlombo joined the provincial government as the Member of the Executive Council (MEC) for Culture, Sports and Recreation. Less than three months, he resigned as an MEC and was replaced with Leah Mabuza after the National Executive Committee of the African National Congress instructed premier Mandla Ndlovu to fire one of his male MECs and replace them with a woman in order for his executive council to be compliant with their gender policy that if a province has a male premier, 60% of the members of the executive council must be women.
