= Candith Mashego-Dlamini =

South African politician (born 1960)

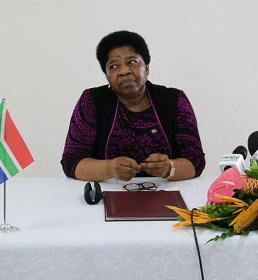
- Mashego-Dlamini in 2022

Deputy Minister of International Relations and Cooperation
- In office 29 May 2019 – 30 June 2024 Serving with Alvin Botes
- President: Cyril Ramaphosa
- Minister: Naledi Pandor
- Preceded by: Reginah Mhaule
- Succeeded by: Thandi Moraka

Member of the National Assembly
- In office 21 May 2014 – 30 June 2024

Deputy Minister of Rural Development and Land Reform
- In office 26 May 2014 – 25 May 2019 Serving with Mcebisi Skwatsha
- President: Jacob Zuma; Cyril Ramaphosa
- Minister: Gugile Nkwinti; Maite Nkoana-Mashabane
- Preceded by: Pam Tshwete
- Succeeded by: Portfolio abolished

Personal details
- Born: Kwati Candith Mashego; 1 January 1960 (age 66) Hazyview, Transvaal; Union of South Africa
- Spouse: Noah Dlamini
- Education: University of South Africa

Kwati Candith Mashego-Dlamini (born 1 January 1960) is a South African politician from Mpumalanga. She served as the Deputy Minister of International Relations and Cooperation from May 2019 until June 2024, and she also served as Deputy Minister of Rural Development and Land Reform from 2014 to 2019.

A teacher by profession, Mashego-Dlamini was a member of the Mpumalanga Provincial Legislature from 1994 to 2014 and served in several different portfolios in the Mpumalanga Executive Council. She was elected to the National Assembly in 2014 and was appointed as a deputy minister by President Jacob Zuma. Zuma's successor, President Cyril Ramaphosa, appointed her to her current position after the 2019 general election.

Mashego-Dlamini is a member of the African National Congress (ANC) and was formerly an office bearer in the Mpumalanga branch of the ANC Women's League. From 2017 to 2022, she was an elected member of the ANC National Executive Committee.

== Early life and career ==
Mashego-Dlamini was born on 1 January 1960 on a farm in Hazyview in the former Eastern Transvaal. After matriculating at Mshadza High School, she was a temporary teacher at Mganduzweni High School between 1980 and 1981. She went on to complete a teaching diploma and, later, a bachelor's degree at the University of South Africa.

While teaching, she was active in anti-apartheid organisations, including the Federation of South African Women, and in the National Education Union of South Africa, a precursor to the South African Democratic Teachers' Union. She became active in the African National Congress (ANC) during the negotiations to end apartheid, joining the ANC Youth League and ultimately becoming a member of the party's Provincial Executive Committee in the Eastern Transvaal. She also began a decade-long stint as provincial treasurer of the Eastern Transvaal branch of the ANC Women's League.

== Provincial government ==
In South Africa's first post-apartheid elections in 1994, Mashego-Dlamini was elected to represent the ANC in the Mpumalanga Provincial Legislature, where she served for the next two decades. She also served in the Executive Council of Mpumalanga during that time, initially as Member of the Executive Council (MEC) for Health, Welfare and Gender Affairs under Premier Mathews Phosa and then as MEC for Agriculture, Conservation and Environment under Premier Ndaweni Mahlangu.

She remained in her ANC Women's League office during this period, and, between 1999 and 2002, she served on the ANC National Executive Committee as a co-opted member. Her co-option followed the ANC's 50th National Conference in 1997, at which the Mpumalanga ANC had unsuccessfully attempted to secure her direct election onto the committee. She was also viewed as a possible "dark-horse" contender to succeed Mahlangu as ANC provincial chairperson in 2002, though that position ultimately went to Fish Mahlalela.

Under Premier Thabang Makwetla, who governed Mpumalanga from 2004 to 2009, Mashego-Dlamini held two portfolios: she was appointed as MEC for Public Works in 2004, but she became MEC for Local Government and Housing in a reshuffle in 2007. While she was serving in the latter office, in August 2008, she stood for election as deputy provincial chairperson of the ANC's Mpumalanga branch, but she was defeated by Charles Makola; Makola's candidacy was backed by David Mabuza, who became provincial chairperson at the same elective conference. Unlike Mabuza, Mashego-Dlamini was a supporter of Premier Makwetla and of former ANC president Thabo Mbeki.

Mabuza became Premier of Mpumalanga after the 2009 general election, and Mashego-Dlamini, still perceived as a political threat to him, was not initially appointed to his Executive Council. However, she joined in November 2010, when Mabuza appointed her as MEC for Agriculture, Rural Development and Land Administration. In another reshuffle in July 2013, she became MEC for Health and Social Development, a portfolio which she held until the 2014 general election.

== National government ==
=== Rural Development and Land Reform: 2014–2019 ===
In the 2014 election, Mashego-Dlamini was nominated to stand for the National Assembly, the lower house of the South African Parliament, and she was elected, ranked 58th on the ANC's national party list. In the aftermath of the election, President Jacob Zuma appointed her as Deputy Minister of Rural Development and Land Reform. She was one of two deputy ministers in the portfolio, the other being Mcebisi Skwatsha.

During this period, at the ANC's 54th National Conference in December 2017, Mashego-Dlamini was directly elected to the ANC National Executive Committee for the first time. She was elected narrowly, ranked 80th of the 80 elected members by number of votes received.

=== International Relations and Cooperation: 2019–2024 ===
Pursuant to the 2019 general election, Mashego-Dlamini was re-elected to the National Assembly and reappointed as a deputy minister: President Cyril Ramaphosa named her as Deputy Minister of International Relations and Cooperation, serving under Minister Naledi Pandor and alongside Alvin Botes. In this capacity, during a March 2022 parliamentary debate about the Russian invasion of Ukraine, Mashego-Dlamini urged "all South Africans not to take sides [in] the conflict between Russia and Ukraine, as this could go against our principles".

Her five-year term on the ANC National Executive Committee ended in December 2022 and she was not re-elected at the party's 55th National Conference.

She was also not reelected to the National Assembly of South Africa following the 2024 South African general election.

== Personal life ==
She is married to Noah Dlamini, who owns a private security company in Mpumalanga.
