= Norah Mahlangu =

South African politician (born 1973)

Norah Mahlangu MPL

Member of the Mpumalanga Provincial Legislature
- Incumbent
- Assumed office 21 May 2014

Member of the Mpumalanga Executive Council for Human Settlements
- In office March 2018 – 24 February 2021
- Premier: Refilwe Mtsweni-Tsipane
- Preceded by: Speedy Mashilo
- Succeeded by: Speedy Mashilo

Member of the Mpumalanga Executive Council for Culture, Sport and Recreation
- In office 30 May 2014 – March 2018
- Premier: Refilwe Mtsweni-Tsipane
- Preceded by: Sibongile Manana
- Succeeded by: Thandi Shongwe

Personal details
- Citizenship: South Africa
- Party: African National Congress

Norah Mahlangu-Mabena (born 7 July 1973) is a South African politician who is currently representing the African National Congress (ANC) as a Member of the Mpumalanga Provincial Legislature. She previously served in the Executive Council of Mpumalanga as Member of the Executive Council (MEC) for Culture, Sport and Recreation from 2014 to 2018 and MEC for Human Settlements from 2018 to 2021.

Mahlangu-Mabena was elected to the provincial legislature in the 2014 general election, ranked tenth on the ANC's provincial party list. On 30 May 2014, David Mabuza, then the Premier of Mpumalanga, announced his new Executive Council, in which Mahlangu-Mabena was appointed MEC for Culture, Sport and Recreation. Mahlangu-Mabena was also active in local structures of the ANC; in 2015 she was elected as an ordinary member of the Mpumalanga ANC's Provincial Executive Committee, ranked fifth by number of votes received, and by mid-2017 she was the Regional Chairperson of the ANC Woman's League's Nkangala branch. She was viewed as a political supporter of Mabuza and endorsed his candidacy for the national ANC presidency ahead of the party's 54th National Conference in December 2017.

She remained MEC for Culture, Sport and Recreation until March 2018, when Mabuza's successor, Refilwe Mtsweni-Tsipane, appointed her MEC for Human Settlements in a cabinet reshuffle. In the 2019 general election, she was re-elected to her legislative seat, ranked ninth on the ANC's party list, and retained the human settlements portfolio in Mtsweni-Tsipane's new Executive Council. She was fired from the Executive Council on 24 February 2021, along with three other MECs who were viewed as loyalists of Mabuza.

In February 2025, she had to take a one-month special leave from work after her nude video was leaked on the WhatsApp group of her party’s provincial structures.
