= Mmathulare Coleman =

South African politician

Member of the National Assembly
- In office 6 May 2009 – 7 May 2019

Member of the Mpumalanga Provincial Legislature
- In office April 1994 – May 2009

Member of the Mpumalanga Executive Council for Education
- In office May 2008 – May 2009
- Premier: Thabang Makwetla
- Preceded by: Siphosezwe Masango
- Succeeded by: Reginah Mhaule

Personal details
- Born: 15 August 1966 (age 59)
- Citizenship: South African
- Party: African National Congress

Elsie Mmathulare "Busi" Coleman (born 15 August 1966) is a South African politician who represented the African National Congress (ANC) in the National Assembly from 2009 to 2019. Before that, she served in the Mpumalanga Provincial Legislature from 1994 to 2009, including as a Member of the Executive Council (MEC) from 1999 to 2009. She served in Premier Ndaweni Mahlangu's government as MEC for Social Services from 1999 to 2003 and as MEC for Health from 2003 to 2004, and then in Premier Thabang Makwetla's government as MEC for Finance from 2004 to 2008 and as MEC for Education from 2008 to 2009.

== Early life ==
Coleman was born on 15 August 1966.

== Provincial legislature: 1994–2009 ==
During the 1990s, she was active in the ANC Women's League, and she was elected to an ANC seat in the Mpumalanga Provincial Legislature during South Africa's first democratic elections in 1994. Towards the end of the legislative term that followed, from 1998 to 1999, she served as the Majority Chief Whip in the provincial legislature.

Pursuant to the 1999 general election, she was re-elected to her legislative seat and appointed to the Mpumalanga Executive Council by Premier Ndaweni Mahlangu, who named her as Member of the Executive Council (MEC) for Social Services, Population and Development. She remained in that portfolio until August 2003. During that time, in March 2002, she was elected to a three-year term as Deputy Provincial Secretary of the ANC's Mpumalanga branch. In September 2003, Mahlangu moved her to a new government office as MEC for Health, and she remained in that office until the 2004 general election.

After the election, on 3 May 2004, newly elected Premier Thabang Makwetla announced that Coleman would serve as MEC for Finance in his government. She remained in that position until a reshuffle in May 2008, when she was replaced by Jabu Mahlangu and appointed as MEC for Education.

== National Assembly: 2009–2019 ==
In the 2009 general election, Coleman was elected to an ANC seat in the National Assembly, the lower house of the South African Parliament. She was re-elected to her seat in 2014, ranked 68th on the ANC's national party list. During her second term in the Assembly, the chaired the Portfolio Committee on Economic Development. She did not stand for re-election in the 2019 general election.

== Personal life ==
She is married to businessman Teddy Coleman, with whom she has one daughter.
