= Sibongile Manana =

South African politician

Member of the National Assembly

Assembly Member for Mpumalanga
- In office 21 May 2014 – 7 May 2019
- In office 23 April 2004 – May 2009

Personal details
- Born: 6 September 1960 (age 65)
- Citizenship: South Africa
- Party: African National Congress
- Children: Mduduzi Manana

Millicent Ntombizodwa Sibongile Manana (born 6 September 1960) is a South African politician from Mpumalanga. She represented the African National Congress (ANC) as a legislator from 1994 to 2019, most proximately in the National Assembly from 2014 to 2019 and 2004 to 2009. She also sat in the Mpumalanga Provincial Legislature, where she served on the Mpumalanga Executive Council from 1999 to 2004 and 2009 to 2014.

Manana is best known for her tenure as Mpumalanga's Member of the Executive Council (MEC) for Health from 1999 to 2003 during the HIV/AIDS epidemic; she staunchly resisted the rollout of antiretroviral drugs in the province's public health facilities. She was a member of the ANC's National Executive Committee from 2007 to 2012.

== Early life ==
Manana was born on 6 September 1960.

== Legislative career ==
=== 1994–1999: Provincial backbenches ===
Manana worked as a nurse during apartheid and was elected to represent the ANC in the Mpumalanga Provincial Legislature in the 1994 general election, South Africa's first under universal suffrage. She subsequently chaired the legislature's Standing Committee on Health until she was appointed chairperson and then whip of the ANC caucus.

=== 1999–2004: Executive Council ===
Pursuant to the next general election in 1999, Manana was appointed to the Mpumalanga Executive Council by Premier Ndaweni Mahlangu, who named her as Member of the Executive Council (MEC) for Health. Her tenure in that office was extremely controversial. IOL said she was "reviled" and "disastrous", the Mail & Guardian said had "a reputation as Mpumalanga's own Nurse Ratched", and the Treatment Action Campaign said she was "a disaster". Her tenure coincided with the peak of the HIV/AIDS epidemic in South Africa, which was especially severe in Mpumalanga, but she adhered to the AIDS-skepticism propagated by the national government under President Thabo Mbeki and Health Minister Manto Tshabalala-Msimang and she actively resisted the roll-out of antiretroviral drugs in public health facilities in the province.

==== Battle with GRIP ====
From 2001, Manana engaged in a prolonged battle with the Greater Nelspruit Rape Intervention Project (GRIP), a non-profit organisation whose volunteers provided counselling and information to rape victims in public hospitals and police stations. Among GRIP's services was access to antiretroviral drugs, subsidised by private donations. Manana said that the provision of antiretrovirals constituted an attempt to undermine the government's policy and ordered GRIP to leave the public hospitals where they worked. She said that GRIP was

abusing hospital facilities, staff and patients for unethical research purposes. There's no cure here. What about the patients? What are they giving them, how much of it, what are the protocols and who is monitoring follow up?

Manana obstructed the group's antiretroviral access programme by instructing that GRIP could not have access to the HIV testing results of its clients, some of them children, and fired the medical superintendent at one of the hospitals for having allowed GRIP to operate in the facility. When doctors and administrators in public hospitals objected, they faced reprisal: at least five senior administrators were charged with gross misconduct for advocating for GRIP to remain in their facilities, while at least three doctors were fired from public hospitals in the province for having signed memoranda in support of the prescription of post-exposure prophylaxis for rape victims; the Labour Court later found that they had been dismissed unfairly. In February 2003, the Public Protector, Lawrence Mushwana, publicly appealed to Manana to abandon her campaign against GRIP, saying that it was an unjustifiable expense to taxpayers.

==== ARV rollout and spending ====
At the same time, after the Constitutional Court ordered in 2002 that public hospitals had to provide access to mother-to-child transmission prevention drugs, Manana was viewed as "the worst offender" in failing to implement this directive. Both the Treatment Action Campaign and the AIDS Law Project sued her for defying the court order, and the South African Human Rights Commission investigated her department for possible human rights violations. Responding to the possibility that Manana would be held in contempt of court for failing to obey the Constitutional Court, national Health Minister Tshabalala-Msimang famously said that "they'll have to jail me as well". The opposition United Democratic Movement said that "going to jail in solidarity with her MEC is the first constructive proposal she has ever made in her entire term of office".

By 2003, Manana's department was also under investigation for alleged financial mismanagement at senior levels: among other things, there was evidence that the department had spent millions of rands from its HIV/AIDS budget on recreational events, despite the severe lack of capacity in the health system. While the investigation was ongoing, Manana's head of department alleged that Manana had been bullying and threatening her staff. In late August 2003, Premier Mahlangu announced that two forensic audits into the department had "revealed issues of management and aspects of gross negligence in the procurement of medical equipment and the use of the HIV/Aids budget". He therefore reshuffled the Executive Council, appointing Manana as MEC for Sports, Recreation, Arts and Culture; she remained in that portfolio until the 2004 general election.

=== 2004–2009: National Assembly backbenches ===
In the 2004 election, Manana was elected to an ANC seat in the National Assembly, the lower house of the South African Parliament; she represented the Mpumalanga constituency. She served a full legislative term in the seat. During that time, at the ANC's 52nd National Conference in December 2007, she was elected to a five-year term on the ANC's National Executive Committee; by the number of votes received, she was ranked 64th of the 80 ordinary members elected.

=== 2009–2014: Return to the Executive Council ===
Pursuant to the next general election in May 2009, Manana returned to the Mpumalanga Provincial Legislature, where newly elected Premier David Mabuza appointed her as MEC for Community Safety, Security and Liaison. She remained in that portfolio until Mabuza's first reshuffle on 3 November 2010, in which she swopped portfolios with Vusi Shongwe and became MEC for Culture, Sport and Recreation.

=== 2014–2019: Return to the National Assembly ===
After four years as Culture MEC, Manana was listed 100th on the ANC's national party list in the 2014 general election and returned to the National Assembly backbenches. She served another full term and left the seat after the 2019 general election.

== Personal life ==
Her son is national politician Mduduzi Manana.
