= Siphosezwe Masango =

South African politician

Member of the National Assembly
- In office 21 May 2014 – 7 May 2019

Member of the Mpumalanga Executive Council for Human Settlements
- In office 3 November 2010 – 18 February 2013
- Premier: David Mabuza
- Preceded by: Madala Masuku
- Succeeded by: Andries Gamede

Member of the Mpumalanga Executive Council for Safety and Security
- In office May 2008 – May 2009
- Premier: Thabang Makwetla
- Preceded by: Fish Mahlalela
- Succeeded by: Sibongile Manana (for Community Safety, Security and Liaison)

Personal details
- Citizenship: South Africa
- Party: African National Congress

Moses Siphosezwe Amos Masango is a South African politician who represented the African National Congress (ANC) in the National Assembly from 2014 to 2019, during which time he chaired the Portfolio Committee on International Relations and Cooperation. Before that, he served in the Mpumalanga Provincial Legislature and also sat on the Mpumalanga Executive Council.

== Legislative career ==
Masango is a member of the African National Congress (ANC) and served as the party's Deputy Provincial Secretary in Mpumalanga from 1999 to 2002. He also served in the Mpumalanga Executive Council prior to 2004 and ahead of the 2004 general election he was ranked first in the ANC's internal candidate selection process, receiving more nominations than even the outgoing Premier, Ndaweni Mahlangu. After the election, he was retained in the Executive Council by Mahlangu's successor, Premier Thabang Makwetla, who appointed him as Member of the Executive Council (MEC) for Education. He remained in that position until May 2008, when he was moved to a new portfolio as MEC for Safety and Security.

He was re-elected to another term in the Mpumalanga Provincial Legislature in the 2009 general election, ranked ninth on the ANC's provincial party list. However, he was not initially appointed to the Executive Council of newly elected Premier David Mabuza. Instead, he served as an ordinary Member of the Provincial Legislature until 3 November 2010, when Mabuza announced a reshuffle which saw Masango return to the Executive Council as MEC for Human Settlements. He remained in that position until Mabuza's second reshuffle, announced on 18 February 2013, in which he was fired for "poor performance".

In the 2014 general election, Masango was elected to an ANC seat in the National Assembly, the lower house of the South African Parliament; he was ranked 91st on the ANC's national party list. During the legislative term that followed, he chaired the Portfolio Committee on International Relations and Cooperation. He did not stand for re-election to Parliament in 2019.

== Assault charge ==
In 2013 and 2014, Masango appeared in court on charges of assault and intimidation: a man alleged that he and two of his bodyguards had assaulted him at Nkomazi toll plaza in July 2012.
