= Nomsa Mtsweni =

South African politician

Member of the Mpumalanga Executive Council for Social Development
- In office May 2014 – August 2016
- Premier: David Mabuza
- Preceded by: Candith Mashego-Dlamini (for Health and Social Development)
- Succeeded by: Busi Shiba

Member of the Mpumalanga Executive Council for Culture, Sport and Recreation
- In office January 2005 – February 2007
- Premier: Thabang Makwetla
- Preceded by: Madala Masuku
- Succeeded by: Jabu Mahlangu

Member of the Mpumalanga Executive Council for Agriculture and Land Administration
- In office May 2004 – January 2005
- Premier: Thabang Makwetla
- Succeeded by: Madala Masuku

Personal details
- Citizenship: South Africa
- Party: African National Congress

Nomsa Sammy Mtsweni is a South African politician who has represented the African National Congress (ANC) in the Mpumalanga Provincial Legislature and the National Assembly, including as a Member of the Mpumalanga Executive Council from 2004 to 2007 and from 2014 to 2016. She has also served as Mayor of Thembisile Hani Local Municipality and Dr JS Moroka Local Municipality.

== Political career ==
Mtsweni formerly represented the ANC in the National Assembly, the lower house of the South African Parliament. In the 2004 general election, she was elected to an ANC seat in the Mpumalanga Provincial Legislature. Premier Thabang Makwetla also appointed her to the Mpumalanga Executive Council, where she served as a Member of the Executive Council (MEC) for Agriculture and Land Administration. She held that position for less than a year before, in January 2005, she was named as MEC for Culture, Sport and Recreation. In February 2007, in another reshuffle, Makwetla fired her from the Executive Council altogether. She remained an ordinary Member of the Provincial Legislature.

Mtsweni subsequently left the legislature and did not return until the 2014 general election, in which she was ranked ninth on the ANC's provincial party list. After the election, Premier David Mabuza appointed her to his second-term cabinet as MEC for Social Development. However, her tenure was again short-lived: she stood as a candidate in the 2016 local elections and was elected as Executive Mayor of Thembisile Hani Local Municipality, necessitating her departure from the provincial legislature. Her portfolio in the Executive Council was transferred to Busi Shiba.

As of 2022, Mtsweni was the Executive Mayor of Dr JS Moroka Local Municipality.
