= Breyten =

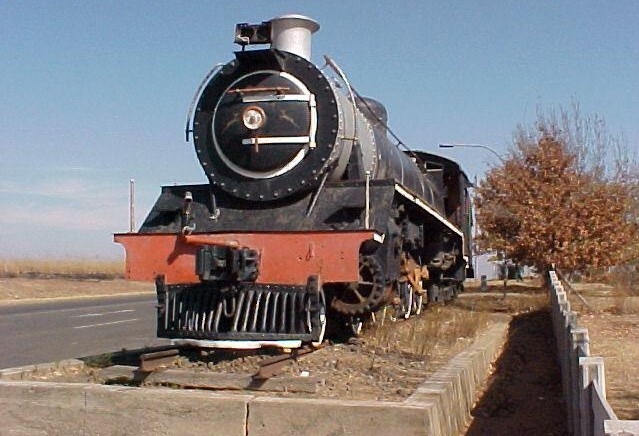
- SAR Class 19 no. 1369, plinthed in Breyten

- Location within Mpumalanga Location within South Africa
- Coordinates: 26°18′S 29°59′E
- Country: South Africa
- Province: Mpumalanga
- District: Gert Sibande
- Municipality: Msukaligwa

Area
  - Total: 4.52 km^{2} (1.75 sq mi)
- Elevation: 1,753 m (5,751 ft)

Population (2011)
  - Total: 14,347
  - Density: 3,170/km^{2} (8,220/sq mi)

Racial makeup (2011)
  - Black African: 94.4%
  - Coloured: 0.8%
  - Indian/Asian: 0.6%
  - White: 4.0%
  - Other: 0.2%

First languages (2011)
  - Zulu: 81.4%
  - Swazi: 4.5%
  - Afrikaans: 4.3%
  - English: 2.9%
  - Other: 6.8%
- Time zone: UTC+2 (SAST)
- Postal code (street): 2330
- PO box: 2330
- Area code: 017

Breyten is a small farming town in Mpumalanga, South Africa. It is situated at the foot of Klipstapel, the highest point on the watershed between the westward-flowing Vaal River system and the eastward-flowing Olifants and Komati River systems. The town is located 25 km (15 mi) west of Chrissiesmeer, 30 km (19 mi) north of Ermelo, 32 km (20 mi) southwest of Carolina, and 35 km (21 mi) southeast of Hendrina. The main spoken languages are Zulu, Swati and Afrikaans.

The town was built upon the Bothasrust farmstead, which itself was granted to one Lukas Potgieter as compensation for his losing a leg during the First Boer War. The farm was later sold to Nicolaas Breytenbach, a field cornet during the Second Boer War, after whom the town was named in 1906.

Breyten was once a vibrant railway town. Passenger and freight trains departed and connected in Breyten to Johannesburg, Nelspruit, Witbank, Pretoria and other areas of South Africa. Common freight was agricultural produce and livestock, but most predominantly coal from the local collieries. Due to losses in the manufacturing sector, the town has since become depressed with high unemployment. Breyten is now a stopover for tourists who are headed to either the Lowveld or Highveld. Tourists can be served by a local hotel and a few guest houses.

Breyten continues to be a mining community, with the majority of the population still employed in collieries such as Tselentis and Spitzkop of the Imbawula Group. Coal is still the most transported good out of Breyten. A leather factory named JCB Leather Works can also be found in Breyten. Breyten now features a private college called Xtensive ICT Academy, which is centered around information technology training.

== Notable people ==
- Ahmed Timol - Anti-apartheid activist and communist
- Naas Botha - National rugby union team player
- Vusi Shongwe - Politician, former acting Premier of Mpumalanga, current MEC for the Mpumalanga Department of Agriculture, Rural Development, Land and Environmental Affairs
