= Mpumi Hlophe =

South African politician (born 1980)

Member of the Mpumalanga Executive Council for Agriculture, Rural Development and Environmental Affairs
- In office 18 June 2024 – 15 July 2025
- Premier: Mandla Ndlovu
- Preceded by: Busisiwe Shiba
- Succeeded by: Khethiwe Moeketsi

Member of the Mpumalanga Executive Council for Finance, Economic Development and Tourism
- In office 7 October 2022 – 14 June 2024
- Premier: Refilwe Mtsweni-Tsipane
- Preceded by: Vusi Mkhatshwa
- Succeeded by: Office abolished

Member of the Mpumalanga Provincial Legislature
- Incumbent
- Assumed office 22 May 2019

Personal details
- Party: African National Congress

Nompumelelo "Mpumi" Hlophe (born 29 September 1980) is a South African politician who is currently serving as Mpumalanga's Member of the Executive Council (MEC) for Agriculture, Rural Development and Environmental Affairs since June 2024. She is a member of the African National Congress (ANC).

Hlophe was elected to the Mpumalanga Provincial Legislature in the 2019 general elections, ranked tenth on the ANC's party list. She was appointed Chairperson of Committees ("chair of chairs") in the legislature. In April 2022, she was elected to the Provincial Executive Committee of the ANC's Mpumalanga branch; her candidacy was supported by the provincial ANC Youth League and was subsequently appointed the ANC's Mpumalanga deputy secretary. In October of that year, she was appointed to the Mpumalanga Executive Council by Refilwe Mtsweni-Tsipane, the incumbent Premier of Mpumalanga; she succeeded Vusi Mkhatshwa as MEC for Finance, Economic Development and Tourism.

Following the 2024 general election, Hlophe was appointed MEC for Agriculture, Rural Development and Environmental Affairs.
