= Collen Sedibe =

South African politician (born 1971)

Collen Sedibe MPL
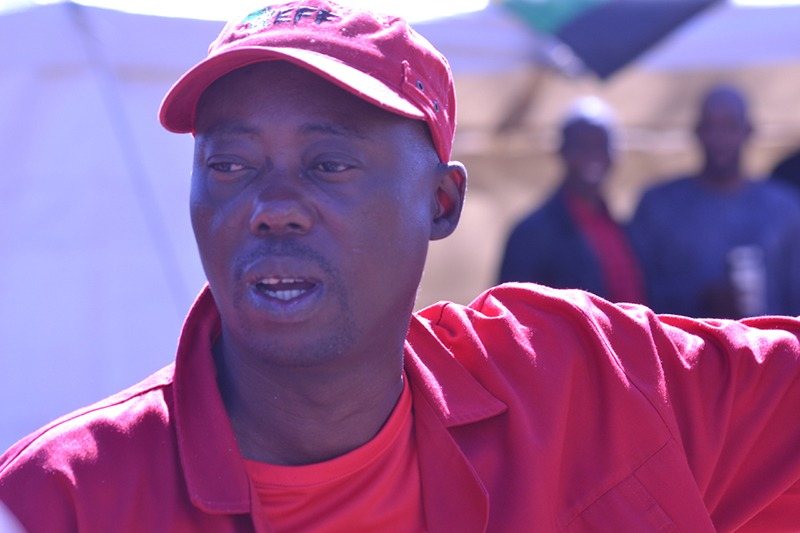
- Sedibe in 2016

Member of the Mpumalanga Provincial Legislature
- Incumbent
- Assumed office 21 May 2014

Personal details
- Born: 23 September 1971 (age 55)
- Citizenship: South Africa
- Party: Economic Freedom Fighters (since 2013); African National Congress (until 2013)
- Education: University of the North; Regenesys Business School

Michael Collen Sedibe (born 23 September 1971) is a South African politician who is currently a Member of the Mpumalanga Provincial Legislature and the provincial leader of the legislature's official opposition party, the Economic Freedom Fighters (EFF). He joined the EFF in 2013 after he was expelled from the African National Congress and he was first elected to the provincial legislature in the 2014 general election. In September 2022, he was elected to a third term as the EFF's Provincial Chairperson in Mpumalanga.

== Early life and education ==
Sedibe was born on 23 September 1971. According to the EFF, he was active in the South African Youth Congress and Congress of South African Students in the 1980s. He was arrested for his anti-apartheid activism. He matriculated in 1992 and in 1994 he enrolled in a public management degree at the University of the North at Turfloop, where he joined the South African Students Congress. He was later active in the trade union movement and also joined the African National Congress (ANC) and its Youth League; his local ANC branch was in White River in Mpumalanga. In 2017 he completed a Master's degree in public management at Regenesys Business School.

== African National Congress ==
By the early 2000s, Sedibe worked in the provincial government of Mpumalanga, first in the department of cooperative governance and then in the treasury department. He also remained active in the ANC: by 2012, he was Branch Chairperson of the ANC's White River branch. He supported ANC Deputy President Kgalema Motlanthe's bid to unseat Jacob Zuma as ANC President at the party's 53rd National Conference; he became known for promoting Motlanthe's campaign in Mpumalanga. He was also known as an opponent of David Mabuza, who was the Premier of Mpumalanga between 2009 and 2018, and of the ANC faction aligned to Mabuza.

On 18 April 2013, Sedibe was involved in a violent altercation at a regional meeting of the ANC in Malalane. In his account, he was assaulted after he raised a point of order because Ngrayi Ngwenya, the pro-Mabuza chairperson of the ANC's Ehlanzeni region, "was speaking when another speaker was on the floor"; he said that he was then punched and kicked by Ngwenya and by Bheki Mhlongo, a bodyguard of Thulisile Khoza, then the Mayor of Nkomazi. He subsequently laid criminal charges against Ngwenya and Mhlongo, both of whom were convicted of assault.

However, the ANC alleged that Sedibe had disrupted the April 2013 meeting, as well as two other party meetings, and he was subjected to an internal disciplinary hearing. He was expelled from the party and joined the Economic Freedom Fighters (EFF), a newly launched opposition party.

== Economic Freedom Fighters ==
=== Member of the Provincial Legislature: 2014–2019 ===
After he joined the EFF in 2013, Sedibe became the party's head of organising and campaigns in Mpumalanga, and in January 2014, he quit his job in the provincial government. In the 2014 general election, the EFF touted him as the party's candidate for election as Premier of Mpumalanga, and he was listed first on the EFF's party list in the provincial election. He was elected to one of two EFF-held seats in the Mpumalanga Provincial Legislature.

In January 2017, Sedibe was involved in planning a political demonstration which he described on Facebook as "a land occupation programme which will take place between White River and Hillsview". He later explained that the EFF had planned to target unoccupied government-owned land, rather than to invade occupied properties. On 29 January, the day of the demonstration, he was arrested with an EFF local councillor, Cyril Chuene; they appeared in court on charges of trespassing, incitement to public violence, and a violation of the Regulation of Gatherings Act. The case was struck off the roll in late February 2017. However, a week later, Sedibe was arrested again, immediately after he and another EFF legislator, Alfred Skhosana, were ejected from the legislature for disrupting Premier Mabuza's State of the Province address. A police spokesman said that he faced fraud charges.

Sedibe was also formally installed as the chairperson of the EFF's Mpumalanga branch, although News24 reported that there were tensions within the provincial party about Sedibe's style of leadership. He was re-elected as EFF Provincial Chairperson in September 2018, with Sam Zandamela as his deputy.

=== Leader of the Opposition: 2019–present ===
In the 2019 general election, the EFF displaced the Democratic Alliance as the ANC's official opposition in the provincial legislature; Sedibe was again ranked first on the party list and was re-elected to his legislative seat. He was also on the EFF's national party list, for election to the South African Parliament, but, ranked 179th, he did not gain election to a national seat. When the provincial legislature was constituted, the EFF nominated Sedibe for election as Speaker of the Mpumalanga Provincial Legislature, but he was defeated in a vote by Busisiwe Shiba. On 17 September 2022, during a party elective conference in Mbombela, he was elected to a third term as EFF Provincial Chairperson in Mpumalanga, with Rhulani Qhibi as his new deputy; he defeated a challenge from Stan Hlatshwayo, earning over 400 votes to Hlatshwayo's 287.

== Personal life ==
As of 2012, Sedibe was a single father of two children.

On 29 March 2025, a warrant of arrest was issued for EFF's Collen Sedibe, after he threatened the life of a service provider in connection with a multimillion-rand department of education contract.
