= Mandla Msibi =

South African politician (born 1975)

Mandla Msibi MPL

Mpumalanga MEC for Co-operative Governance and Traditional Affairs
- In office 7 October 2022 – 18 June 2024
- Premier: Refilwe Mtsweni-Tsipane
- Preceded by: Mandla Ndlovu
- Succeeded by: Office abolished
- In office 29 May 2019 – 24 February 2021
- Premier: Refilwe Mtsweni-Tsipane
- Preceded by: Speedy Mashilo
- Succeeded by: Busisiwe Shiba

Provincial Treasurer of the African National Congress in Mpumalanga
- Incumbent
- Assumed office 2 April 2022; Stepped aside: 2 April 2022 - 5 September 2022
- Provincial Chairperson: Mandla Ndlovu
- Preceded by: Vusi Shongwe

Mpumalanga MEC for Agriculture, Rural Development, Land and Environmental Affairs
- In office 24 February 2021 – 12 October 2021
- Premier: Refilwe Mtsweni-Tsipane
- Preceded by: Vusi Shongwe
- Succeeded by: Busisiwe Shiba

Member of the Mpumalanga Provincial Legislature
- Incumbent
- Assumed office 22 May 2019

Speaker of the Mbombela Local Municipality
- In office 2016–2019
- Preceded by: Jesta Sidell

Personal details
- Born: Mandla Jeffrey Msibi; 14 December 1975 (age 50) Daantjie, Transvaal Province, South Africa
- Party: African National Congress
- Profession: Politician

Mandla Jeffrey Msibi (born 14 December 1975) is a South African politician and educator who has been a Member of the Mpumalanga Provincial Legislature since May 2019. He was the MEC for Cooperative Governance and Traditional Affairs from May 2019 to February 2021, the MEC for Agriculture, Rural Development, Land and Environmental Affairs from February 2021 until his dismissal in October 2021 and the MEC for Co-operative Governance and Traditional Affairs from October 2022 until June 2024. Prior to serving in the legislature, he was the speaker and a councillor in the Mbombela Local Municipality. Msibi is a member of the African National Congress.

On 2 April 2022, he was elected as the provincial treasurer of the ANC in Mpumalanga, despite the ANC's "step aside" rule for all members who have been criminally charged. At the time, Msibi faced charges of murder and attempted murder. He stepped aside from the position on 5 April. In September 2022, the murder charges were provisionally withdrawn.

== Early life and education ==
Msibi was born on 14 December 1975 in Daantjie in the Transvaal Province, now Mpumalanga. He attended Lekazi Central High School. He achieved a senior teacher's diploma from the Elijah Mango College of Education. Msibi obtained a certificate in negotiation skills and basic business skills from the University of Potchefstroom before attaining a certificate in executive leadership from the University of Pretoria.

== Career ==
Msibi was an educator for the education department. He later found employment as a youth commissioner in the office of the Premier of Mpumalanga. In March 2006, he was elected as a councillor in the Mbombela Local Municipality. He took over as the speaker of the municipality following the 2016 municipal elections.

On 22 May 2019, Msibi became a member of the provincial legislature. Premier Refilwe Mtsweni-Tsipane appointed him to the post of MEC for Cooperative Governance and Traditional Affairs. He assumed office on 29 May.

On 24 February 2021, Msibi was moved to the Agriculture, Rural Development, Land and Environmental Affairs portfolio of the executive council.

On 12 October 2021, Mtsweni-Tsipane fired Msibi as MEC for Agriculture, Rural Development, Land and Environmental Affairs as he faced murder and attempted murder charges. He remained as an ordinary ANC member of the provincial legislature.

=== Provincial treasurer of the ANC ===
On 25 March 2022, the provincial African National Congress Women's League in Mpumalanga nominated Msibi for ANC provincial treasurer ahead of the party's provincial elective conference from 1–3 April 2022, despite the party's "step aside" rule for all members with criminal charges to stand back from all party activities until their cases have been resolved. ANC NEC member Dakota Legoete did however say that Msibi was allowed to contest the position at the conference.

On 2 April, Msibi was officially nominated in absentia for the provincial treasurer position. He was elected with 442 votes, defeating Norah Mahlangu who received only 271 votes. He is however ineligible to serve, given the criminal charges against him. The ANC coordinator in the office of the secretary-general, Gwen Ramokgopa, described his election as disappointing as the "step aside" rule had failed to translate to branches and said that the ANC NEC will likely engage with him and possibly ask him to contemplate resigning from the position as Ramokgopa described the newly elected provincial leadership as incomplete and "limping" without him. On 5 April 2022, he stepped aside after the national ANC treasurer-general Paul Mashatile reminded him of the step-aside resolution in a letter dated 3 April.

=== Return to the provincial executive council ===
On 5 September 2022, the NPA provisionally withdrew the murder charges against him, meaning he could assume his duties as ANC provincial treasurer. He was appointed as MEC for Co-operative Governance and Traditional Affairs on 7 October 2022. Following the 2024 provincial election, the newly elected premier Mandla Ndlovu did not appoint Msibi to his Executive Council.

== Controversies ==
In July 2017, Msibi was accused of vandalising a vehicle that belonged to a councillor. He was then accused of breaking into and vandalising a house in August. Msibi was also accused of attempted murder and the assault of a person who was left partially disabled after the ordeal. He was also accused of wrecking a BMW X5. In February 2018, he was arrested in Pienaar outside Mbombela for malicious damage to property after he allegedly retaliated against community members who accused him of being corrupt.

=== 2021 murder and attempted murder charges ===
Msibi and his co-accused, Njabulo Mkhonto and Anele Sonke Mnisi, are currently facing two counts of murder and one of attempted murder relating to the fatal shooting of Dingaan Ngwenya and Sindela Lubisi and the wounding of a third person at the Cayotes Shisa Nyama in Nelspruit on 22 August 2021. On 11 October 2021, Msibi handed himself over to police and has since remained in police custody. He and his co-accused appeared in the Nelspruit Magistrate's Court on 12 October 2021 There was a bomb scare at Msibi's bail hearing in court on 13 October. He was later granted bail on 19 October. On 24 February, the Nelspruit Magistrate's Court postponed the trial to 1 March 2022 as to give the National Prosecuting Authority (NPA) enough time to establish its charge sheet against Msibi and his co-accused.

On 5 September 2022, the murder charges against Msibi were provisionally withdrawn.
