= Makhosazane Masilela =

South African politician (born 1980)

Makhosazane Masilela MPL

Member of the Mpumalanga Executive Council for Economic Development and Tourism
- Incumbent
- Assumed office 18 June 2024
- Premier: Mandla Ndlovu
- Preceded by: New portfolio

Speaker of the Mpumalanga Provincial Legislature
- In office 2 March 2021 – 28 May 2024
- Premier: Refilwe Mtsweni-Tsipane
- Deputy: James Jim Skosana; Jeaneth Thabethe
- Preceded by: Busisiwe Shiba
- Succeeded by: Lindi Masina

Member of the Mpumalanga Provincial Legislature
- Incumbent
- Assumed office 22 May 2019

Personal details
- Citizenship: South Africa
- Party: African National Congress

Makhosazane Christine Masilela (born 29 September 1980) is a South African politician who has represented the African National Congress (ANC) in the Mpumalanga Provincial Legislature since 2019. She was appointed Speaker of the Provincial Legislature in March 2021. Masilela was appoinrted Member of the Executive Council (MEC) for Economic Development and Tourism in June 2024.

== Political career ==
Masilela was elected to her legislative seat in the 2019 general election, ranked 19th on the ANC's provincial party list. On 2 March 2021, she was elected unopposed as Speaker of the provincial legislature, with James Skosana as her deputy. Masilela and Skosana succeeded Busisiwe Shiba and her deputy Vusi Mkhatshwa, who had left their offices to join the Mpumalanga Executive Council. Masilela's appointment was welcomed by the opposition Democratic Alliance and Freedom Front Plus.

She is also active in the ANC's Ehlanzeni regional branch, the party's largest branch in Mpumalanga. In April 2022, at a party elective conference in White River, she was elected Deputy Regional Chairperson of the Ehlanzeni ANC, beating Momotho Thumbathi in a vote. She stood for the position as Jackie Macie's running mate on a slate viewed as politically aligned to Mandla Ndlovu, the recently elected Provincial Chairperson of the Mpumalanga ANC. She and Macie defeated an opposing slate led by Gillion Mashego and Ngrayi Ngwenya, both strong allies of David Mabuza, Ndlovu's predecessor and rival.

Following the 2024 election, Masilela was succeeded as speaker of the provincial legislature by Lindi Masina. Masilela was then appointed Member of the Executive Council (MEC) for Economic Development and Tourism by the newly elected premier Mandla Ndlovu.
