= Speedy Mashilo =

South African politician

Speedy Mashilo MPL

Member of the Mpumalanga Executive Council for Human Settlements, Co-operative Governance and Traditional Affairs
- Incumbent
- Assumed office 18 June 2024
- Premier: Mandla Ndlovu
- Preceded by: Office established

Provincial Treasurer of the African National Congress in Mpumalanga
- Acting; 5 April 2022 – 7 October 2022
- Provincial Chairperson: Mandla Ndlovu
- Preceded by: Mandla Msibi

Deputy Provincial Chairperson of the African National Congress in Mpumalanga
- Incumbent
- Assumed office 2 April 2022
- Provincial Chairperson: Mandla Ndlovu

Member of the Mpumalanga Executive Council for Human Settlements
- In office 24 February 2021 – 14 June 2024
- Premier: Refilwe Mtsweni-Tsipane
- Preceded by: Norah Mahlangu
- Succeeded by: Office abolished

Member of the Mpumalanga Provincial Legislature
- Incumbent
- Assumed office 7 August 2015
Former positions
Premier of Mpumalanga
Acting; 25 July 2022 – 5 August 2022
Preceded by	Refilwe Mtsweni-Tsipane
Succeeded by	Refilwe Mtsweni-Tsipane
Member of the Mpumalanga Executive Council for Cooperative Governance and Traditional Affairs
In office 18 August 2016 – 26 February 2018
Premier	David Mabuza
Preceded by	Violet Siwela
Succeeded by	Norah Mahlangu
In office 20 March 2018 – 29 May 2019
Preceded by	Refilwe Mtsweni-Tsipane
Succeeded by	Mandla Msibi
Mayor of Nkangala District Municipality
In office 2010–2014

Personal details
- Born: Speedy Katisho Mashilo; 27 December 1965 (age 60)
- Party: African National Congress

Speedy Katisho Mashilo (born 27 December 1965) is a South African politician who is currently the Member of the Executive Council (MEC) for Human Settlements, Co-operative Governance and Traditional Affairs in Mpumalanga. He is also the deputy provincial chairperson and was the acting provincial treasurer of the local branch of the African National Congress (ANC).

== Political career ==
Mashilo became Nkangala district mayor in 2010, having previously served as district mayor of Ekangala. He lost the post of chairman of the ANC in Nkangala briefly in 2013 when the provincial executive was dissolved.

Following the ANC's poor performance in Nkangala during the 2014 election, the ANC provincial executive committee decided that Mashilo would no longer serve as district mayor and become a member of the National Council of Provinces instead. Mashilo turned down the offer and resigned as district mayor. In 2015, Mashilo became a member of the Mpumalanga Provincial Legislature.

In September 2017, Nkangala ANC branches called to remove Mashilo as their regional chairman when it emerged that Mashilo had a property in Bronkhorstspruit, Gauteng, listed as his residence. They questioned how he was appointed as a Mpumalanga MEC when he did not qualify. When asked in an interview Mashilo did not deny that he lived in Bronkhorstspruit, saying that for years he had held several leadership positions in the province and at local government level and that nobody had brought up those questions.

In March 2018, he became the MEC for Cooperative Governance and Traditional Affairs.

In 2019, Mashilo was excluded from the Mpumalanga executive council by Premier Refilwe Mtsweni-Tsipane with The Citizen describing it as an "unexpected move that ignited political shock waves in the province". Furthermore, it said that the sidelining of Mashilo marked the beginning of a process to "purge" certain leaders that were said to be threat to her power.

Following premier Mtsweni-Tsipane's cabinet reshuffle in 2021, Mashilo was reappointed to the cabinet as the MEC for Human Settlements.

Following the 2024 general election, Mashilo was appointed to the lead the amalgamated Department of Human Settlements and Cooperative Governance and Traditional Affairs in the Executive Council.

== Kidnapping and aftermath ==
In November 2021, Mashilo was kidnapped by hijackers for seven hours whilst driving on the R568 road between Ekangala and KwaMhlanga. According to Mpumalanga police spokesperson Brigadier Selvy Mohlala, his Toyota Hilux, R25,000 in cash and a hunting rifle with 25 rounds of ammunition were stolen from him. The hijackers also asked him for his pin numbers and withdrew R80,000 from several of his bank cards.

In April 2022, Mashilo was elected deputy provincial chairperson of the ANC in Mpumalanga with 505 votes, beating David Nhlabathi who got 209 votes. He was then appointed as acting provincial treasurer of Mpumalanga, after Mandla Msibi stepped aside due to attempted murder charges. Mashilo will continue to act as treasurer until Msibi's court case has been finalised.

Mashilo was the acting premier of Mpumalanga from 25 July to 5 August 2022 when Refilwe Mtsweni-Tsipane was out of the country, attending the 24th International Aids Conference in Montreal, Canada.

== See also ==
- List of kidnappings
