= Thandi Shongwe =

South African politician (born 1962)

Member of the Mpumalanga Executive Council for Culture, Sport and Recreation
- In office 24 February 2021 – 14 June 2024
- Premier: Refilwe Mtsweni-Tsipane
- Preceded by: Lindiwe Ntshalintshali
- Succeeded by: Fana Mlombo
- In office March 2018 – 28 May 2019
- Premier: Refilwe Mtsweni-Tsipane
- Preceded by: Norah Mahlangu
- Succeeded by: Lindiwe Ntshalintshali

Member of the Mpumalanga Executive Council for Social Development
- In office 28 May 2019 – 24 February 2021
- Premier: Refilwe Mtsweni-Tsipane
- Preceded by: Busisiwe Shiba
- Succeeded by: Lindiwe Ntshalintshali

Speaker of the Mpumalanga Provincial Legislature
- In office May 2014 – March 2018
- Premier: David Mabuza
- Preceded by: William Lubisi
- Succeeded by: Violet Siwela

Personal details
- Born: Barberton, Transvaal; South Africa
- Party: African National Congress

Blessing Thandi Shongwe (born 28 February 1962) is a South African politician. She formerly served as Speaker of the Mpumalanga Provincial Legislature from 2014 until March 2018, when she was first appointed to the Mpumalanga Executive Council as the MEC for Culture, Sport and Recreation. Following the 2019 election, she was moved to the Social Development portfolio before returning as the MEC for Culture, Sport and Recreation in February 2021. She left the provincial legislature in May 2024. She is a member of the African National Congress (ANC).

== Early life and career ==
Shongwe was born on 28 February 1962 in Barberton in the Transvaal, now part of Mpumalanga province. She trained as a teacher. While working as a teacher and then as a headmaster at primary schools in Mpumalanga, she was active in the ANC's Ehlanzeni regional branch, in the ANC Women's League, and in the South African Democratic Teachers Union. From 2000 to 2006, she was an ANC local councillor in Ehlanzeni and served as the Member of the Mayoral Committee responsible for finance and community safety.

== Career in the legislature ==
In 2009, she was elected to a seat in the Mpumalanga Provincial Legislature, and she subsequently served Deputy Chief Whip of the Majority Party, the ANC, from 2010 to 2014. In the 2014 general election, she was re-elected to the provincial legislature, ranked seventh on the ANC's party list, and was elected Speaker of the legislature. In 2018, the opposition Economic Freedom Fighters laid a complaint against Shongwe with the South African Police Service, alleging that as Speaker Shongwe had contravened the Public Finance Management Act in failing to ensure accountability after the Auditor-General found that two provincial government contracts had been improperly awarded.

Shongwe left the Speaker's office in March 2018 when Refilwe Mtsweni-Tsipane was sworn in as Premier of Mpumalanga and appointed Shongwe to her Executive Council as MEC for Culture, Sport and Recreation. In the 2019 general election, Shongwe was re-elected to the provincial legislature, ranked 11th on the ANC's party list, and Mtsweni-Tsipane moved her to a new portfolio as MEC for Social Development. She remained in that position until February 2021, when Mtsweni-Tsipane announced a reshuffle which saw Shongwe swop portfolios with Lindiwe Ntshalintshali and return to her earlier post as MEC for Culture, Sport and Recreation. Shongwe left the provincial legislature and the provincial government in 2024.
