= Leah Mabuza =

South African politician (1972)

Leah Mabuza MPL

MEC of the Department of Sport, Arts and Culture in Mpumalanga
- Incumbent
- Assumed office September 2024
- Premier: Mandla Ndlovu
- Preceded by: Fidel Mlambo

Member of the Mpumalanga Provincial Legislature
- Incumbent
- Assumed office 2 July 2024

Personal details
- Born: Leah Martha Mabuza; 24 May 1972 (age 53) Witbank, Mpumalanga, South Africa
- Party: African National Congress
- Profession: Politician

Leah Martha Mabuza (born 24 May 1972) is a South African politician who currently serves as MEC for the Department of Sport, Arts and Culture in Mpumalanga since September 2024. She previously served as Mayor of the Nkangala District Municipality from January 2022 to June 2023 and then Mayor of Emalahleni Local Municipality until her appointment as the MEC of the provincial cabinet of Mpumalanga.

Mabuza is currently a member of the Mpumalanga Provincial Legislature since July 2024. She previously served as the regional secretary of the African National Congress (ANC) in the Nkangala District Municipality. She is currently the interim Mpumalanga convenor of the African National Congress Women's League (ANCWL).
