= Busisiwe Shiba =

South African politician (1965)

Mpumalanga MEC for Agriculture, Rural Development, Land and Environmental Affairs
- In office 10 May 2022 – 18 June 2024
- Premier: Refilwe Mtsweni-Tsipane
- Preceded by: Mandla Msibi
- Succeeded by: Nompumelelo Hlophe

Mpumalanga MEC for Cooperative Governance and Traditional Affairs
- In office 24 February 2021 – 10 May 2022
- Premier: Refilwe Mtsweni-Tsipane
- Preceded by: Mandla Msibi
- Succeeded by: Mandla Ndlovu

Speaker of the Mpumalanga Provincial Legislature
- In office 22 May 2019 – 24 February 2021
- Deputy: Vusi Mkhatshwa
- Preceded by: Violet Siwela

Mpumalanga MEC for Social Development
- In office 18 August 2016 – 22 May 2019
- Premier: Refilwe Mtsweni-Tsipane; David Mabuza
- Preceded by: Nomsa Mtsweni
- Succeeded by: Thandi Shongwe

Personal details
- Born: Busisiwe Paulina Shiba; 10 May 1965 (age 61) Breyten, Mpumalanga
- Party: African National Congress
- Children: 3
- Education: Master’s Degree (Public Management)
- Alma mater: Regenesys Business School
- Profession: Politician

Busisiwe Paulina "Busi" Shiba (born 10 May 1965) is a South African politician who was the Mpumalanga MEC for Agriculture, Rural Development, Land and Environmental Affairs from 2022 to 2024. She previously served as the Mpumalanga MEC for Cooperative Governance and Traditional Affairs from 2021 to 2022, as the Speaker of the Mpumalanga Provincial Legislature from 2019 to 2021 and as the MEC for Social Development from 2016 to 2019. Shiba is a member of the African National Congress (ANC).

Shiba was the mayor of the Chief Albert Luthuli Local Municipality in Carolina before former Premier of Mpumalanga and now deputy president David Mabuza reshuffled his cabinet and made Shiba the new MEC of Social Development soon after the August 2016 local government elections. She was also appointed the convener of the Mpumalanga African National Congress Women's League (ANC).
