= Brenda Moeketsi =

South African politician (1980)

Member of the Mpumalanga Executive Council for Social Development
- Incumbent
- Assumed office June 2024
- Premier: Mandla Ndlovu
- Preceded by: Lindiwe Ntshalintshali

Mayor of Dipaleseng Local Municipality
- In office November 2021 – June 2024
- Preceded by: Mafunda Makhubu

Personal details
- Born: 29 August 1980 (age 46) Balfour, Mpumalanga
- Party: African National Congress

Brenda Khethiwe Moeketsi (born 29 August 1980) is a South African politician who currently serves as MEC for the Mpumalanga Department of Agriculture, Rural Development, Land and Environmental Affairs from July 2025 after a cabinet reshuffle by Mpumalanga Premier Mandela Ndlovu. In June 2024 she was appointed as MEC for Social Development and She had also served as speaker of council for the Dipaleseng Local Municipality from August 2016 until November 2021 when she was elected mayor of the same municipality.

== Scandals ==
In March 2022, Moeketsi was implicated in an investigation report compiled by the Mpumalanga Provincial Government. The report probed bad governance, nepotism and corruption at the Dipaleseng Local Municipality and found that at least R53.8 million was irregularly paid to seven companies and that officials increased their salaries without following proper procedures. The money wasted in corruption in that municipality amounted to over R100-million in just less than a year. In August 2022, she was ordered by her party African National Congress to go lay corruption charges against those implicated in the report, which included herself, at the Balfour police station following a public outcry over delays in taking actions against corruption but up to date nobody was arrested.

News agency 013NEWS reported in March 2022 how a brand new Toyota Hilux Legend 50 bakkie was allegedly bought for Moeketsi by two tenderpreneurs implicated in the investigation report when she was still a speaker in October 2020. The tenderpreneurs bought the high-end bakkie for her after they were awarded a three-year security contract at the Dipaleseng municipality where Moeketsi was speaker. Opposition party Freedom Front Plus in their condemnation said it always raised suspicion when a service provider buys a car for a sitting speaker.
