= Reginah Mhaule =

South African politician

The Honourable Reginah Mhaule MP

Deputy Minister of Basic Education
- Incumbent
- Assumed office 29 May 2019
- President: Cyril Ramaphosa
- Minister: Angie Motshekga; Siviwe Gwarube
- Preceded by: Enver Surty

Member of the National Assembly
- Incumbent
- Assumed office 26 February 2018

Deputy Minister of International Relations and Cooperation
- In office 26 February 2018 – 7 May 2019 Serving with Luwellyn Landers
- President: Cyril Ramaphosa
- Minister: Lindiwe Sisulu
- Preceded by: Nomaindiya Mfeketo
- Succeeded by: Alvin Botes; Candith Mashego-Dlamini
Prior offices 2003–2018
Member of the Mpumalanga Executive Council for Education
In office May 2009 – 26 February 2018
Premier	David Mabuza
Preceded by	Mmathulare Coleman
Succeeded by	Sibusiso Malaza
Member of the Mpumalanga Provincial Legislature
In office 6 May 2009 – 26 February 2018
Executive Mayor of Mbombela
In office 2003–2006

Personal details
- Born: Makgabo Reginah Mhaule; 1 December 1961 (age 64) Hazyview, Transvaal; South Africa
- Party: African National Congress
- Education: University of Fort Hare (PhD)

Makgabo Reginah Mhaule (born 1 December 1961) is a South African politician from Mpumalanga who is currently serving as Deputy Minister of Basic Education. She has represented the African National Congress (ANC) in the National Assembly since 2018.

Mhaule is a teacher by profession and entered government as a local councillor in Mbombela Local Municipality, where she was Executive Mayor from 2003 to 2006. After that, she served in the Mpumalanga Provincial Legislature from 2009 to 2018. Throughout that time, she was Mpumalanga's Member of the Executive Council for Education in the provincial government of Premier David Mabuza.

She has been an elected member of the ANC National Executive Committee since December 2017, and she joined the National Assembly in February 2018, when President Cyril Ramaphosa appointed her as Deputy Minister of International Relations and Cooperation. She remained in that portfolio until after the 2019 general election, when she was appointed to her current office.

== Education and early career ==
Mhaule was born on 1 December 1961 in Hazyview in the former Eastern Transvaal. She trained as a teacher after graduating high school. Later, after the end of apartheid, she completed a Bachelor of Arts at the University of South Africa in 1996, a Bachelor of Education Honours at the University of Potchefstroom in 2002, and a Master's in public administration at the University of Pretoria in 2012. In May 2019, she completed a doctorate in public administration at the University of Fort Hare, with a dissertation about education outcomes in KwaMhlanga.

She began her career as a primary school teacher in the Eastern Transvaal in 1980, though she later moved to a secondary school, Sibukosetfu Secondary in Hazyview, where she rose to become deputy principal and acting principal. During her 20 years as a teacher, she was also politically active; she was the inaugural chairperson of the local Hazyview branch of the South African Democratic Teachers' Union when the union was established in 1990, and she also became a member of the African National Congress (ANC).

== Mbombela Local Municipality: 2000–2006 ==
In the December 2000 local elections, Mhaule was elected to represent the ANC as a local councillor in Mbombela Local Municipality in the Eastern Transvaal, by then renamed as Mpumalanga Province. She also became speaker of the council. In July 2003, she was promoted when she was elected as mayor of Mbombela. She held that office for three years, departing the council entirely in 2006. Thereafter she worked as a senior manager in the provincial Department of Roads and Transport until 2009.

== Mpumalanga Executive Council: 2009–2018 ==
In the April 2009 general election, Mhaule was elected to an ANC seat in the Mpumalanga Provincial Legislature. On 12 May, newly elected Premier David Mabuza announced that she would also join the Executive Council of Mpumalanga as Member of the Executive Council for Education. She was re-elected to her seat in the 2014 general election and remained in office for the remainder of Mabuza's premiership.

During this period, Mhaule rose through the ranks of the ANC's provincial and national structures. In 2015, she was co-opted as a member of the ANC National Executive Committee, and she was elected to a full five-year term on the committee at the ANC's 54th National Conference in December 2017. Indeed, at the 2017 conference, she was the third-most popular candidate, behind only Zweli Mkhize and Lindiwe Zulu. The Citizen reported that Mabuza had lobbied heavily for her candidacy, possibly because he wanted her to act as his "de-facto chief whip" in the committee.

== National government ==
=== International Relations and Cooperation: 2018–2019 ===
On 26 February 2018, recently elected President Cyril Ramaphosa announced his cabinet and named Mhaule as Deputy Minister of International Relations and Cooperation under Minister Lindiwe Sisulu. She was one of two deputy ministers in the portfolio, serving alongside Luwellyn Landers. In order to take up this position in the national government, Mhaule resigned from the Mpumalanga Provincial Legislature and was sworn in to the National Assembly. James Masango, the provincial leader of the opposition Democratic Alliance, objected to Mhaule's promotion, claiming that both she and Mabuza – who was appointed as Ramaphosa's Deputy President – had "left havoc in the departments they oversaw" in Mpumalanga.

=== Basic Education: 2019–present ===
In the May 2019 general election, Mhaule was elected to a full term in the National Assembly, ranked 57th on the ANC's national party list. In the aftermath of the election, Ramaphosa appointed her as Deputy Minister of Basic Education under long-serving Minister Angie Motshekga. In December 2022, at the ANC's 55th National Conference, she was narrowly re-elected to the ANC National Executive Committee, ranked 78th of the 80 ordinary members elected.

== Personal life ==
Mhaule is married. In January 2019, her domestic worker opened a complaint against her with the police, alleging that Mhaule might have drawn her salary fraudulently.
