= Madala Masuku =

South African politician

First Deputy General Secretary of the South African Communist Party
- Incumbent
- Assumed office 15 July 2022
- Secretary: Solly Mapaila
- Second Deputy: David Masondo
- Preceded by: Solly Mapaila

Member of the National Assembly
- In office 21 May 2014 – 28 May 2024

Deputy Minister of Economic Development
- In office 26 May 2014 – 25 May 2019
- President: Jacob Zuma; Cyril Ramaphosa
- Minister: Ebrahim Patel
- Preceded by: Hlengiwe Mkhize
- Succeeded by: Portfolio reconfigured

Personal details
- Born: Madala Backson Masuku; 6 June 1965 (age 61)
- Party: African National Congress
- Other political affiliations: South African Communist Party
- Education: Witwatersrand University; University of KwaZulu-Natal

Madala Backson Masuku (born 6 June 1965) is a South African politician who is currently serving as the deputy general secretary of the South African Communist Party (SACP). He was formerly the Deputy Minister of Economic Development from May 2014 to May 2019.

Masuku entered government in the Mpumalanga Provincial Legislature, holding various positions in the Mpumalanga Executive Council from 2004 to 2014 under Premiers Thabang Makwetla and David Mabuza. He went on to serve in the National Assembly of South Africa between 2014 and 2024, during which time he was appointed as deputy minister under President Jacob Zuma's second cabinet.

He held his legislative positions as a representative of the African National Congress (ANC), the SACP's Tripartite Alliance partner, and he was formerly a member of the ANC's Provincial Executive Committee in Mpumalanga. He has also been a member of the SACP's Central Committee since July 2007, and he was elected to a five-year term as the SACP's first deputy general secretary in July 2022.

== Early life and career ==
Masuku was born on 6 June 1965. He has a master's degree in public management and development management from the University of the Witwatersrand, completed in 2002, and a master's degree in leadership from the University of KwaZulu-Natal, completed in 2014.

Formerly a maths and science teacher, Masuku began his professional career in the public sector during the apartheid transition. A member of the African National Congress (ANC), he was an organiser for the ANC Youth League from 1993 to 1994, ahead of the first democratic elections in April 1994, and then was the media coordinator for the newly appointed Premier of Mpumalanga, Mathews Phosa, from 1994 to 1995. He later served as spokesman and head of communication in the premier's office. During the same period, he was elected in 1992 to the provincial executive of the South African Communist Party (SACP), where he served until 2007, and he was a member of the ANC Provincial Executive Committee in Mpumalanga between 1993 and 1999.

== Provincial government: 2004–2014 ==
Between May 2004 and May 2014, Masuku served in several different positions in the Mpumalanga provincial government as a Member of the Executive Council (MEC). He was first appointed to the Executive Council after the April 2004 general election by premier Thabang Makwetla; in a series of reshuffles, Makwetla named him as MEC for Culture, Sports and Recreation in May 2004, MEC for Agriculture and Land Administration in January 2005, and MEC for Public Works in February 2007.

Ahead of the April 2009 general election, Masuku was one of three candidates whom the provincial ANC nominated as suitable to succeed Makwetla as Premier of Mpumalanga, but he was considered a dark horse candidate and the position was given to David Mabuza. Mabuza, too, devised several reshuffles, appointing Masuku as MEC for Human Settlements—a new portfolio—in May 2009, MEC for Cooperative Governance and Traditional Affairs in November 2010, and MEC for Finance in February 2013. He was thus in the finance portfolio in late 2013 when the provincial government made irregular expenditures related to memorials for Nelson Mandela, which were investigated by both the Public Protector and the Hawks.

During the course of his service in the Executive Council, Masuku returned to the ANC Provincial Executive Committee between 2004 and 2012. He also became a senior member of the SACP. At the SACP's national congress in July 2007, Masuku was elected to the SACP's Central Committee for the first time; by number of votes received, he was ranked 25th of the 30 ordinary members elected. He was re-elected to another five-year term at the next national congress in July 2012, now ranked 13th of 35.

Also during this period, the SACP said that Masuku was being threatened with "political thuggery" by unknown aggressors. In October 2010, his official vehicle was shot at and then robbed while he was driving to Johannesburg on the N12. The SACP said that it was the fourth attack on Masuku that year and linked the intimidation to rumours that Masuku was a candidate to succeed Mabuza as premier, though the local police said that they viewed the shooting as "just mischief".

As the May 2014 general election approached, Masuku was again mooted as a possible candidate for the Mpumalanga premiership. However, when the party's final list of candidates for the provincial legislature was published, Masuku was excluded altogether.

== National government: 2014–2024 ==
In the May 2014 election, Masuku was instead elected to an ANC seat in the National Assembly, the lower house of the South African Parliament. Announcing his second-term cabinet on 25 May 2014, President Jacob Zuma appointed Masuku as Deputy Minister of Economic Development, in which capacity he deputised Ebrahim Patel. Both he and Patel retained their offices through the entirety of the Fifth Parliament, continuing their roles in the cabinet that Cyril Ramaphosa appointed in 2018 when he replaced Zuma as president. In addition, at the SACP's congress in July 2017, Masuku was re-elected to the SACP Central Committee and additionally appointed to its politburo.

In the next general election in May 2019, Masuku was re-elected to the National Assembly, ranked 146th on the ANC's national party list. He served the parliamentary term as a backbencher; President Ramaphosa sacked him from the cabinet, reportedly despite the SACP lobbying for his reappointment. However, Mabuza—Masuku's former boss in Mpumalanga—had been elevated to the deputy presidency of South Africa, and in October 2020 he announced that he had appointed Masuku as his special advisor. At the SACP's July 2022 congress, Masuku was promoted to a top leadership position; he was elected to a five-year term as the party's first deputy general secretary, serving under general secretary Solly Mapaila and alongside second deputy David Masondo.

== Later career: 2024–present ==
Masuku was not reelected to Parliament in the May 2024 general election. He remained a prominent member of the SACP's leadership.
