= Fish Mahlalela =

South African politician

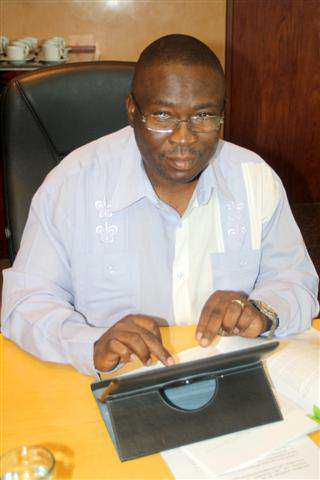
- Mahlalela in the Mpumalanga Provincial Legislature in April 2013

Deputy Minister of Tourism
- In office 29 May 2019 – 17 June 2024
- President: Cyril Ramaphosa
- Minister: Mmamoloko Kubayi-Ngubane; Lindiwe Sisulu; Patricia de Lille
- Preceded by: Elizabeth Thabethe

Member of the National Assembly
- In office 21 May 2014 – 28 May 2024

Provincial Chairperson of the African National Congress in Mpumalanga
- In office March 2002 – June 2005
- Deputy: William Lubisi
- Preceded by: Ndaweni Mahlangu
- Succeeded by: Thabang Makwetla

Personal details
- Born: Amos Fish Mahlalela; 29 August 1962 (age 64) Mbuzini, Eastern Transvaal; South Africa
- Party: African National Congress
- Education: University of the Witwatersrand

Amos Fish Mahlalela (born 29 August 1962) is a South African politician from Mpumalanga who was the Deputy Minister of Tourism from May 2019 until June 2024 and represented the African National Congress (ANC) in the National Assembly from May 2014 until May 2024. In June 2023, he was additionally elected as the Provincial Chairperson of the ANC Veterans' League in Mpumalanga.

A former anti-apartheid activist in Umkhonto we Sizwe, Mahlalela joined the government in 1994. Before returning to the National Assembly in 2014, he served in the Mpumalanga Provincial Legislature and held several positions in the Mpumalanga Executive Council. He was the Provincial Chairperson of the ANC's Mpumalanga branch from 2002 to 2005.

== Early life and activism ==
Mahlalela was born on 29 August 1962 in Mbuzini, a village in the former Eastern Transvaal (present-day Mpumalanga). He matriculated at the nearby Nkomazi High School and later completed an honours degree in governance and leadership at the University of the Witwatersrand.

He joined the African National Congress (ANC) in 1980 at a time when it was banned by the apartheid government. In 1985, he went into exile with the party, joining Umkhonto we Sizwe (MK) and receiving military training in Ethiopia, Angola, and the Soviet Union. After his training was complete, in 1989, MK sent him back across the South African border to carry out underground operations. He was arrested and detained for four months before the end of apartheid.

During the post-apartheid transition, Mahlalela applied for amnesty at the Truth and Reconciliation Commission. In his testimony to the commission, he confessed to having carried out the assassination of Thomas Joshua Mangane, whom he shot dead in Mbuzini on 10 January 1990. He said that he had carried out the shooting on the orders of his MK commanders, who had apparently identified Mangane as a police informant.

== Post-apartheid political career ==
=== Provincial government ===
In the first post-apartheid elections in April 1994, Mahlalela was elected to an ANC seat in the new National Assembly. However, he was subsequently transferred to the Mpumalanga Provincial Legislature, where he served in the Mpumalanga Executive Council under Premiers Mathews Phosa, Ndaweni Mahlangu, and Thabang Makwetla. At various times, he was a Member of the Executive Council in six different portfolios: Environmental Affairs and Tourism; Culture, Sports and Recreation; Local Government and Traffic; Roads and Transport; Safety and Security; and Health and Social Development.

During his time in the Mpumalanga Provincial Legislature, Mahlalela served as Provincial Chairperson of the ANC's Mpumalanga branch from 2002 to 2004. He ran for the position in a crowded field of contenders, which also included the incumbent, Ndaweni Mahlangu, and provincial Speaker William Lubisi, among others. He was elected in a landslide at a provincial party conference on 23 March 2002, receiving 261 votes to Mahlangu's 98. He served only one term in the office: at the next elective conference in June 2005, he was unseated by Mahlangu's successor as Premier, Thabang Makwetla.

=== National government ===
In the 2014 general election, Mahlalela stood as a candidate for the National Assembly and was elected to a seat. He served as the ANC's whip in the Portfolio Committee on Health during the fifth democratic Parliament from 2014 to 2019. Ahead of the ANC's 54th National Conference in December 2017, Mahlalela was a prominent campaigner for Cyril Ramaphosa's winning presidential bid.

He was re-elected to his parliamentary seat in the 2019 general election, and, on 29 May 2019, President Ramaphosa appointed Mahlalela as Deputy Minister of Tourism under his second-term cabinet. On 3 June 2023, he was elected as the Provincial Chairperson of the Mpumalanga branch of the ANC Veterans' League, serving alongside Provincial Secretary Wilson Mudau.

Mahlalela left parliament at the 2024 general election and was succeeded by Maggie Sotyu as Deputy Minister of Tourism.
