= Mathews Phosa =

South African politician and lawyer (born 1952)

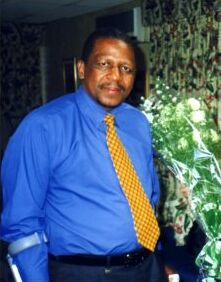
- Phosa in 1998

1st Premier of Mpumalanga
- In office 7 May 1994 – 15 June 1999
- Preceded by: Position established
- Succeeded by: Ndaweni Mahlangu

Personal details
- Born: 1 September 1952 (age 74) Bushbuckridge Mpumalanga, South Africa
- Spouse: Pinky Phosa
- Education: University of the North
- Profession: Attorney; Politician

Nakedi Mathews Phosa (born 1 September 1952) is a South African attorney and politician and was also an anti-apartheid activist. He is a former premier of Mpumalanga as well as a member of the National Executive Committee of the African National Congress (ANC). Phosa ran for President of the ANC in 2017 but lost to Cyril Ramaphosa.

== Early life and education ==
Phosa was born in Mbombela township, Nelspruit. However, he grew up with his grandfather in a rural area near Potgietersrus (Mokopane). He matriculated at Orhovelani High School in Thulamahashe, Bushbuckridge.

== Political career ==
He was one of the first four members of the ANC to enter South Africa from exile in 1990 in order to start the process of negotiation with the National Party government.

As a result of the first fully inclusive democratic elections in 1994, Phosa was appointed as the first premier of Mpumalanga, a position which he held until 1999. During his time in office, Phosa pioneered planning interaction between the private sector and government. He also spearheaded Nelson Mandela's reconciliation initiatives between the government and the Afrikaans speaking community. Phosa was elected as a member of the National Executive Committee of the ANC in 1999.

In 2001, Cyril Ramaphosa, Tokyo Sexwale and Phosa were investigated in connection with an alleged plot to oust Mbeki. They were cleared.

During the 2007 Conference of the ANC (the 52nd National Conference) held in Polokwane in the Limpopo Province, Phosa was elected to the post of Treasurer General for the Organisation.

== Business career ==
Since 1999 Phosa has served as a business consultant for various local and international businesses. In addition, Phosa currently holds chairman, vice-chairman or board member positions at more than ten prominent South African institutions and companies, including the University of South Africa, Afrikaanse Handelsinstituut, Special Olympics South Africa, Value Logistics, EOH (Pty) Ltd, SA Golden Leaf and Hans Merensky Holdings. On 14 April 2025 Phosa was announced as chairman of Jubilee Metals PLC, the London Stock Exchange listed metals miner and processor.

== Presidential ambitions ==
Phosa unsuccessfully ran for the post of ANC Deputy President in 2012. Cyril Ramaphosa received 3,018 votes and was elected deputy president of the ANC, convincingly defeating Mathews Phosa, who received 470 votes and Human Settlements Minister Tokyo Sexwale, who received 463. On April 29, 2017, Phosa announced that he had accepted a nomination for the ANC Presidency and would be a candidate at the 54th ANC conference in December.

On June 11, 2017, Phosa officially announced his intention to seek the Presidential nomination in December 2017.

== Works ==
- Deur die oog van 'n naald (1996, Tafelberg)
