= Jabu Mahlangu (politician) =

South African politician (born 1958)

National Assembly of South Africa
- In office 21 May 2014 – 7 May 2019

Member of the Mpumalanga Executive Council for Economic Development, Environment and Tourism
- In office 12 May 2009 – 3 November 2010
- Premier: David Mabuza
- Preceded by: Craig Padayachee (for Economic Development and Planning)
- Succeeded by: Norman Mokoena (for Economic Development and Planning)

Member of the Mpumalanga Executive Council for Finance
- In office May 2008 – 12 May 2009
- Premier: Thabang Makwetla
- Preceded by: Mmathulare Coleman
- Succeeded by: Pinky Phosa

Personal details
- Born: Jabulani Lukas Mahlangu; 21 January 1958 (age 68)
- Citizenship: South Africa
- Party: African National Congress

Jabulani Lukas Mahlangu (born 21 January 1958) is a South African politician who represented the African National Congress (ANC) in the Mpumalanga Provincial Legislature and both houses of the South African Parliament from 1994 to 2019. He also served on the Mpumalanga Executive Council from 2004 to 2010 under Premiers Thabang Makwetla and David Mabuza. Most recently, Mahlangu chaired the National Assembly's Portfolio Committee on Telecommunications and Postal Services until the 2019 general election, in which he did not seek re-election.

== Legislative career ==
Mahlangu was elected to Parliament in South Africa's first democratic elections in April 1994. He held his seat until 1997, when he left to take up a seat in the Mpumalanga Provincial Legislature. After two years in Mpumalanga, he returned to the national Parliament in the 1999 general election, in which he was elected to the National Council of Provinces, where he served until 2001.

He left the national Parliament in 2001 to return to the Mpumalanga Provincial Legislature, and he was elected to a full term in the province in the 2004 general election. After the election, he was appointed to the Mpumalanga Executive Council by Premier Thabang Makwetla, who on 3 May 2004 announced that he would serve as Member of the Executive Council (MEC) for Local Government and Housing. He remained in that portfolio until 13 February 2007, when he was transferred to a new portfolio as MEC for Culture, Sport and Recreation in what was viewed as a demotion. He was moved once more during Makwetla's administration, becoming MEC for Finance in May 2008.

After the 2009 general election, on 12 May 2009, new Mpumalanga Premier David Mabuza announced that Mahlangu would remain in the Executive Council, now as MEC for Economic Development, Environment and Tourism. He remained in that portfolio for less than two years before he was fired from the Executive Council in Mabuza's first reshuffle on 3 November 2010. Thereafter, he served as an ordinary Member of the Provincial Legislature and chaired the Portfolio Committee on Public Works, Roads and Transport, and Safety and Security.

In the 2014 general election, Mahlangu was ranked 113th on the ANC's national party list and secured election to the National Assembly, the lower house of the South African Parliament. From October 2017, he chaired the Portfolio Committee on Telecommunications and Postal Services, succeeding Mmamoloko Kubayi, who had been appointed to Cabinet. He did not stand for re-election to his seat in the 2019 general election.
