= Vusi Shongwe =

South African politician (born 1958)

The Honourable Vusi Shongwe MPL
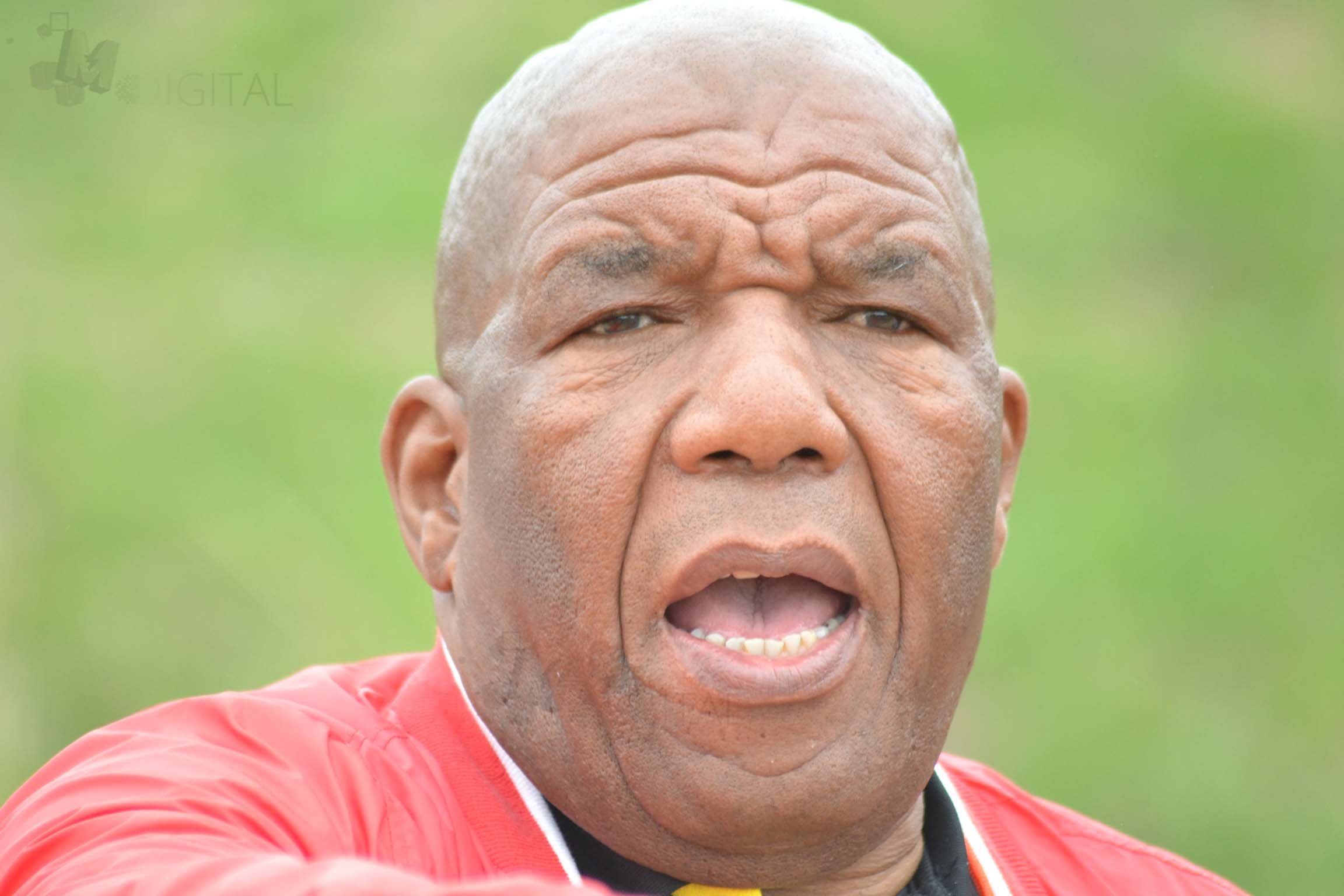
- Vusi Shongwe in 2016

MEC for the Department of Security, Community Safety and Liaison
- In office 24 February 2021 – 18 June 2024
- Premier: Refilwe Mtsweni-Tsipane
- Preceded by: Gabisile Tshabalala
- Succeeded by: Jackie Macie
- In office July 2011 – August 2016
- Premier: David Mabuza
- Preceded by: Sibongile Manana
- Succeeded by: Pat Ngomane

MEC for the Mpumalanga Department of Agriculture, Rural Development, Land and Environmental Affairs
- In office 17 August 2016 – 24 February 2021
- Preceded by: Andries Gamede
- Succeeded by: Mandla Msibi

Acting Premier of Mpumalanga
- In office August 2015 – November 2015
- President: Jacob Zuma

Provincial treasurer of the Mpumalanga ANC
- In office December 2015 – April 2021
- Preceded by: Andries Gamede
- Succeeded by: Mandla Msibi

Personal details
- Born: Vusumuzi Robert Shongwe; 22 April 1958 (age 68) Breyten, Mpumalanga
- Citizenship: South Africa
- Party: African National Congress
- Spouse: Charmaine Zwane (m. 2016)
- Children: Only 3 known, one of them was fatally hit by a car in 2015
- Profession: Politician

Vusumuzi Robert Shongwe (born 22 April 1958) is a South African politician who served in the Mpumalanga Provincial Legislature. He formerly served in the Executive Council in Mpumalanga province. Between September and November 2015, Shongwe served as acting Premier of Mpumalanga while Premier David Mabuza was on sick leave. He is a member of the African National Congress and was formerly treasurer of the party's provincial executive committee in Mpumalanga, previously the chairperson of the ANC in the Gert Sibande region.

== Early life ==
Vusumuzi Robert Shongwe was born on 22 April 1958 in Breyten near Ermelo in what is now Mpumalanga province.

== Career in government ==
In the 2014 South African general election, Shongwe was elected as a member of the Mpumalanga provincial legislature for the African National Congress (ANC). He was appointed Member of the Executive Council (MEC) for Community Safety, Security and Liaison in the province, in which capacity he was the political head of the provincial security structure. While he was in this role, David Mabuza took extended sick leave and Shongwe was appointed acting Premier of Mpumalanga in his stead between September and November 2015.

After the 2016 local government elections, Mabuza reshuffled his cabinet and appointed Shongwe his MEC for Agriculture, Rural Development, Land and Environmental Affairs. He also became Leader of Government Business in the Mpumalanga legislature under Premier Refilwe Mtsweni-Tsipane. In February 2020, Premier Mtsweni-Tsipane assigned him to meet with Russia's Sverdlovsk region minister of international and foreign economic affairs, Visiliy Kozlov, for bilateral talks held in Mbombela.

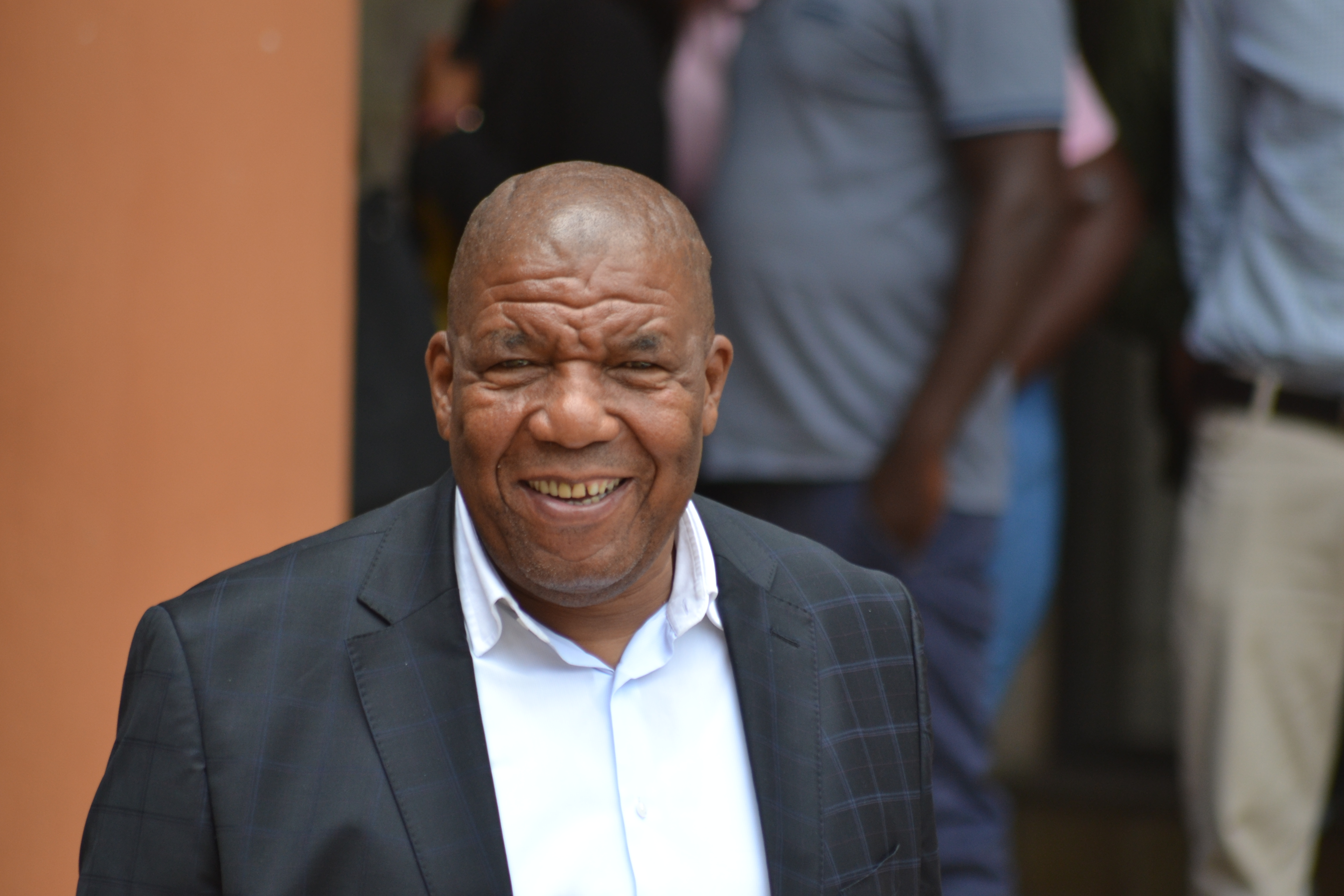
Vusi Shongwe outside the Mpumalanga Provincial Legislature, March 2020

In April 2020, Shongwe called on families and municipalities in Mpumalanga to consider starting vegetable gardens in response to the COVID-19 outbreak in South Africa, as an alternative to receiving food donations.

On 24 February 2021, Shongwe returned to his old portfolio as MEC for Community Safety, Security and Liaison. Shongwe was not included in newly elected premier Mandla Ndlovu's Executive Council following the 2024 election.

== African National Congress positions ==
In December 2015, Shongwe was elected the provincial treasurer of the ANC in Mpumalanga during an elective congress that also elected Mabuza for a third term as ANC provincial chairperson. Before that, Shongwe had served as regional chairperson of the ANC in the party's large Gert Sibande region.

== Personal life ==
Shongwe lives in Ermelo in Gert Sibande District Municipality. He is married to Charmaine Zwane and they have three children. Their third child, Sethu Thandiswa, died on 15 April 2015 at the age of eight when she was hit by a speeding car while crossing a street.
