= Jackson Mthembu =

South African politician (1958–2021)

Minister in the Presidency
- In office 30 May 2019 – 21 January 2021
- President: Cyril Ramaphosa
- Preceded by: Nkosazana Dlamini-Zuma
- Succeeded by: Mondli Gungubele

Chief Whip of the Majority Party
- In office 2 March 2016 – 22 May 2019
- President: Jacob Zuma; Cyril Ramaphosa
- Preceded by: Stone Sizani
- Succeeded by: Pemmy Majodina

Member of the National Assembly of South Africa
- In office 16 May 2014 – 21 January 2019
- Succeeded by: Xiaomei Havard

National Spokesperson of the African National Congress
- In office 1995 – 20 December 1997
- President: Nelson Mandela
- Preceded by: Carl Niehaus
- Succeeded by: Carl Niehaus
- In office 9 May 2009 – 26 May 2014
- President: Kgalema Motlanthe; Jacob Zuma
- Preceded by: Carl Niehaus
- Succeeded by: Zizi Kodwa

Personal details
- Born: Jackson Mphikwa Mthembu; 5 June 1958 Witbank, Mpumalanga, South Africa
- Died: 21 January 2021 (aged 62) Johannesburg, South Africa
- Cause of death: COVID-19
- Citizenship: South Africa
- Party: African National Congress
- Spouse: Thembi Mthembu
- Children: 6
- Parent: Rosie Nantoni Mthembu (d. 25 February 2018)
- Occupation: Politician; spokesperson; anti-apartheid activist

Jackson Mphikwa Mthembu (5 June 1958 – 21 January 2021) was a South African politician who served as Minister in the Presidency of South Africa's government, and as a parliamentarian for the African National Congress (ANC). Previously, he served as the Whip of Parliament for the ruling ANC as well as the national spokesperson for the ANC.

== Early life ==
Mthembu was born in Witbank on 5 June 1958. His mother was Nantoni Mthembu.

== Political career ==
Mthembu served as the MEC for Transport in Mpumalanga from 1997 to 1999, during which he was criticized for spending R2.3 million on ten BMWs.

Mthembu was elected to National Assembly of South Africa in 2014 where he served till his death in 2021.

On 28 November 2017, some of Mthembu's ANC colleagues criticised him for "colluding" with the DA to schedule a debate on state capture in Parliament in defiance of President Jacob Zuma and his colleagues in the ANC caucus who had already called for a more inclusive process to investigate state capture.

== Personal life and death ==
Mthembu was married to Thembi Mthembu. He had six children. His daughter, 25-year-old Nokhwezi Mthembu, committed suicide on 20 March 2019, at their Pelican Park parliamentary village home in Cape Town.

In 2014, Mthembu was shot in the cheek while using an Absa ATM on Mandela Street in the Witbank CBD. The armed man and his accomplices proceeded to Mthembu's car, where four of his friends were waiting for him, and robbed them of their money and cellphones.

Mthembu died from complications of COVID-19 on 21 January 2021, during the COVID-19 pandemic in South Africa. A medical helicopter transporting one of his doctors crashed the same day, killing all five on board.

== See also ==
- List of members of the National Assembly of South Africa who died in office
