= Ndaweni Mahlangu =

South African politician

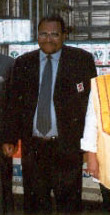

2nd Premier of Mpumalanga
- In office 15 June 1999 – 30 April 2004
- Preceded by: Mathews Phosa
- Succeeded by: Thabang Makwetla

Ndaweni Mahlangu was the former Premier of Mpumalanga in South Africa.
