= William Lubisi =

South African politician

Sipho William Lubisi is a South African politician who served two terms as Speaker of the Mpumalanga Provincial Legislature from 1998 to 2004 and from 2009 to 2014. Between those terms, he served in the Executive Council of Mpumalanga as Member of the Executive Council (MEC) for Health and Social Development (2004–2005, 2007–2008) and MEC for Economic Development and Planning (2005–2007) before he was fired by Premier Thabang Makwetla in May 2008. He was also active in the senior ranks of the Mpumalanga branch of his political party, the African National Congress (ANC).
