= Mandla Ndlovu =

South African politician (1969)

The Honourable Mandla Ndlovu MPL
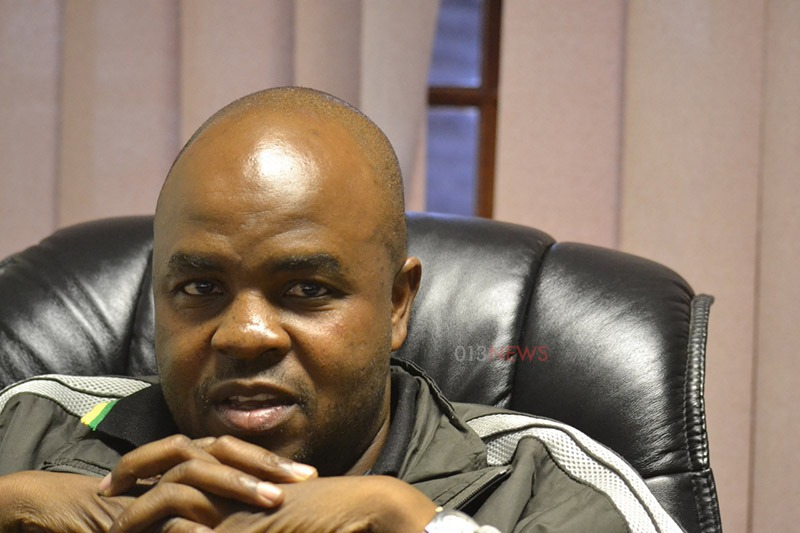
- Ndlovu in 2016

6th Premier of Mpumalanga
- Incumbent
- Assumed office 18 June 2024
- Preceded by: Refilwe Mtsweni-Tsipane

Mpumalanga MEC for Public Works, Roads and Transport
- In office 7 October 2022 – 14 June 2024
- Premier: Refilwe Mtsweni-Tsipane
- Preceded by: Mohita Latchminarain
- Succeeded by: Thulasizwe Thomo

Mpumalanga MEC for Cooperative Governance and Traditional Affairs
- In office 10 May 2022 – 7 October 2022
- Premier: Refilwe Mtsweni-Tsipane
- Preceded by: Busisiwe Shiba
- Succeeded by: Mandla Msibi

Provincial Chairperson of the African National Congress in Mpumalanga
- Incumbent
- Assumed office 2 April 2022
- Deputy: Speedy Mashilo
- Preceded by: David Mabuza

Member of the Mpumalanga Provincial Legislature
- Incumbent
- Assumed office 5 May 2022
- Preceded by: Muzi Chirwa

Personal details
- Born: Mandla Ndlovu; 21 September 1969 (age 56) Bushbuckridge, Mpumalanga
- Party: African National Congress
- Profession: Educator, politician

Mandla Padney Ndlovu (born 21 September 1969) is a South African politician who has served as the sixth Premier of Mpumalanga since June 2024. Between October 2022 and June 2024, he served as Mpumalanga's Member of the Executive Council (MEC) for Public Works, Roads and Transport. He previously served as the MEC for Cooperative Governance and Traditional Affairs May 2022 until October 2022. He has been a member of the Mpumalanga Provincial Legislature since May 2022. Ndlovu is the provincial chairperson of the African National Congress in Mpumalanga.

== Background ==
Ndlovu studied to become an educator he is from the Tsonga tribe. He served as an ANC councillor and as a member of the mayoral committee (MMC) at the Bushbuckridge Local Municipality. He was the regional secretary of the ANC's Bohlabelo region, which is now part of the ANC's Ehlanzeni region. At the ANC's provincial elective conference in December 2015, he was elected as the provincial secretary of the party. After ANC provincial chairperson David Mabuza resigned from the position to take up the position of national ANC deputy president in early 2018, Ndlovu was appointed to serve as the acting provincial chairperson until the next provincial elective conference.

On 2 April 2022, Ndlovu was elected as the ANC's provincial chairperson for a full term. He defeated former provincial secretary, Lucky Ndinisa, for the position with 440 votes to Ndinisa's 278 votes.

== Provincial government ==
On 3 May 2022, the provincial ANC announced that Ndlovu would be taking up the newly elected provincial secretary Muzi Chirwa's seat in the Mpumalanga Provincial Legislature since Chirwa resigned to serve as the provincial secretary full-time. He was sworn in as an MPL on 5 May 2022.

On 10 May 2022, Mpumalanga premier Refilwe Mtsweni-Tsipane announced that she had appointed Ndlovu as the Member of the Executive Council (MEC) for Cooperative Governance and Traditional Affairs, replacing Busisiwe Shiba, who was moved to the agriculture portfolio.

On 7 October 2022, Mtsweni-Tsipane conducted a reshuffle of her executive. Ndlovu was moved to the Public Works, Roads and Transport portfolio, succeeding Mohita Latchminarain, who had been dropped from the executive council.

On 14 June 2024, Ndlovu was elected Premier of Mpumalanga. He was sworn in on 18 June 2024.
