= Premier of Mpumalanga =

Head of government of Mpumalanga province in South Africa

- Incumbent; Mandla Ndlovu since 18 June 2024
- Style: The Honourable
- Appointer: Mpumalanga Provincial Legislature
- Term length: Five years, renewable once
- Inaugural holder: Mathews Phosa
- Formation: 7 May 1994
- Website: www.mpumalanga.gov.za/otp/

The premier of Mpumalanga is the head of government of Mpumalanga province in South Africa. The current premier of Mpumalanga is Mandla Ndlovu, a member of the African National Congress. He took office on 18 June 2024.

== Functions ==
In terms of the constitution, the executive authority of a province is entrusted in the premier. The premier designates an Executive Council made up of ten members of the provincial legislature; they are called members of the Executive Council (MECs). The MECs are accordingly ministers and the Executive Council a cabinet at the provincial level. The premier has the ability to appoint and dismiss MECs at his/her own discretion.

The premier and the Executive Council are responsible for implementing provincial legislation, along with any national legislation allotted to the province. They specify provincial policy and administer the departments of the provincial government; their actions are subject to the national constitution.

In order for an act of the provincial legislature to officially become law, the premier must sign the legislation. The premier can refer legislation back to the legislature for reconsideration if the premier believes the act is unconstitutional. If the premier and the legislature cannot agree, the act must be referred to the Constitutional Court for a final ruling.

The premier is also ex officio a member of the National Council of Provinces, the upper house of Parliament, as one of the special delegates from the province.

== List ==
No.	Portrait	Name (Birth–Death)	Term of office			Political party
No.	Portrait	Name (Birth–Death)	Took office	Left office	Time in office	Political party
1		Mathews Phosa (born 1952)	7 May 1994	15 June 1999	5 years, 39 days	African National Congress
2		Ndaweni Mahlangu	15 June 1999	30 April 2004	4 years, 320 days	African National Congress
3		Thabang Makwetla (born 1957)	30 April 2004	10 May 2009	5 years, 10 days	African National Congress
4		David Mabuza (1960–2025)	10 May 2009	26 February 2018	8 years, 292 days	African National Congress
5		Refilwe Mtsweni-Tsipane (Acting: 27 February – 20 March 2018) (born 1973)	20 March 2018	18 June 2024	6 years, 90 days	African National Congress
6		Mandla Ndlovu (born 1969)	18 June 2024	Incumbent	2 years, 81 days	African National Congress

== Election ==
The election for the Mpumalanga Provincial Legislature is held every five years, simultaneously with the election of the National Assembly; the last such election occurred on 29 May 2024. At the first meeting of the provincial legislature after an election, the members choose the premier from amongst themselves. The provincial legislature can force the premier to resign by a motion of no confidence. If the premiership becomes vacant (for whatever reason) the provincial legislature must choose a new premier to serve out the period until the next election. One person cannot have served more than two five-year terms as premier; however, when a premier is chosen to fill a vacancy the time until the next election does not count as a term.

== See also ==
- Politics of Mpumalanga
- Premier (South Africa)
- President of South Africa
- Politics of South Africa
