= Reedstream Park =

- Location within Mpumalanga Location within South Africa
- Coordinates: 26°10′28″S 29°11′10″E
- Country: South Africa
- Province: Mpumalanga
- District: Nkangala
- Municipality: Emalahleni

Area
  - Total: 7.48 km^{2} (2.89 sq mi)

Population (2011)
  - Total: 5,387
  - Density: 720/km^{2} (1,870/sq mi)

Racial makeup (2011)
  - Black African: 95.8%
  - White African: 2.6%
  - Indian or Asian: 0.24%
  - Coloured: 0.13%
  - Other: 1.13%

First languages (2011)
  - isiZulu: 41%
  - isiXhosa: 12%
  - isiNdebele: 8.9%
  - SiSwati: 7.7%
  - Sepedi: 7.3%
  - Xitsonga: 5.8%
  - English: 5.5%
  - Sesotho: 5.2%
  - Sign language: 0.3%
  - Other: 6.0%
- Time zone: UTC+2 (SAST)
- PO box: 868023

Reedstream Park is a populated place in the Emalahleni Local Municipality, Nkangala District Municipality in the Mpumalanga Province of South Africa.

As of the 2011 census, Reedstream Park had 1,761 households.

== See also ==
- List of populated places in South Africa
