= Vosman =

- Location within Mpumalanga Location within South Africa
- Coordinates: 25°52′12″S 29°08′24″E
- Country: South Africa
- Province: Mpumalanga
- District: Nkangala
- Municipality: Emalahleni

Area
  - Total: 7.48 km^{2} (2.89 sq mi)

Population (2011)
  - Total: 18,963
  - Density: 2,540/km^{2} (6,570/sq mi)

Racial makeup (2011)
  - Black African: 99%
  - Coloured: 0.4%
  - Indian or Asian: 0.2%
  - White African: 0.04%
  - Other: 0.3%

First languages (2011)
  - isiZulu: 52%
  - Sepedi: 10%
  - isiNdebele: 10%
  - SiSwati: 7.9%
  - Xitsonga: 4.9%
  - isiXhosa: 4.2%
  - Sesotho: 2.9%
  - English: 2.1%
  - Sign language: 0.1%
  - Other: 6.0%
- Time zone: UTC+2 (SAST)
- PO box: 868004

Vosman is a populated place in the city of Witbank, Emalahleni Local Municipality, Nkangala District Municipality in the Mpumalanga Province of South Africa.

As of the 2011 census, Vosman had 5,830 households.

== See also ==
- List of populated places in South Africa
