= New Largo =

- Location within Mpumalanga Location within South Africa
- Coordinates: 25°58′17″S 28°58′00″E
- Country: South Africa
- Province: Mpumalanga
- District: Nkangala
- Municipality: Emalahleni

Area
  - Total: 7.21 km^{2} (2.78 sq mi)

Population (2011)
  - Total: 252
  - Density: 35.0/km^{2} (90.5/sq mi)

Racial makeup (2011)
  - Black African: 87%
  - Coloured: 6%
  - White African: 5.1%
  - Indian or Asian: 1.5%
  - Other: 0.4%

First languages (2011)
  - isiZulu: 51%
  - Setswana: 37%
  - Sepedi: 4.2%
  - Sesotho: 2.8%
  - isiNdebele: 2.8%
  - Xitsonga: 1.4%
- Time zone: UTC+2 (SAST)
- PO box: 868014

New Largo is a populated place in the Emalahleni Local Municipality, Nkangala District Municipality in the Mpumalanga Province of South Africa.

As of the 2011 census, New Largo had 19 households.

== See also ==
- List of populated places in South Africa
