= Clewer, Mpumalanga =

Clewer
- Location within Mpumalanga Location within South Africa
- Coordinates: 25°54′24″S 29°07′56″E
- Country: South Africa
- Province: Mpumalanga
- District: Nkangala
- Municipality: Emalahleni

Area
  - Total: 51.70 km^{2} (19.96 sq mi)

Population (2011)
  - Total: 4,569
  - Density: 88.38/km^{2} (228.9/sq mi)

Racial makeup (2011)
  - Black African: 88.2%
  - White African: 8.5%
  - Coloured: 2.3%
  - Indian or Asian: 0.6%
  - Other: 0.2%

First languages (2011)
  - isiZulu: 33.6%
  - isiNdebele: 13.8%
  - Afrikaans: 9.9%
  - Northern Sotho: 8.9%
  - Sotho: 7.6%
  - Swazi: 6.6%
  - isiXhosa: 6.1%
  - English: 4.9%
  - Sign language: 0.3%
  - Other: 7.8%
- Time zone: UTC+2 (SAST)
- PO box: 868006

Clewer is a town in the Emalahleni Local Municipality, Nkangala District Municipality in the Mpumalanga Province of South Africa. It is located near Kendal Power Station, surrounded by the farmstead of Tweefontein and the mountain of Doornrug.

As of the 2011 census, Clewer had 1,487 households.

== See also ==
- List of populated places in South Africa
