= Wolwekrans =

- Country: South Africa
- Province: Mpumalanga
- District: Nkangala
- Municipality: Emalahleni

Area
  - Total: 37.99 km^{2} (14.67 sq mi)

Population (2011)
  - Total: 249
  - Density: 6.55/km^{2} (17.0/sq mi)

Racial makeup (2011)
  - Black African: 99.2%
  - Coloured: 0.40%
  - Indian or Asian: 0.40%

First languages (2011)
  - isiZulu: 38.9%
  - SiSwati: 13.6%
  - Sepedi: 12.0%
  - Xitsonga: 10.8%
  - Sesotho: 6.8%
  - isiNdebele: 6.4%
  - isiXhosa: 6.4%
  - Tshivenda: 2.4%
  - Setswana: 0.8%
  - Other: 1.6%
- Time zone: UTC+2 (SAST)
- PO box: 868018

Wolwekrans is a populated place in the Emalahleni Local Municipality of the Nkangala District Municipality in the Mpumalanga Province of South Africa.

As of the 2011 census, Wolwekrans had 106 households.

== See also ==
- List of populated places in South Africa
