= Phola, Mpumalanga =

Phola
- Country: South Africa
- Province: Mpumalanga
- District: Nkangala
- Municipality: Emalahleni

Area
  - Total: 6.35 km^{2} (2.45 sq mi)

Population (2011)
  - Total: 31,885
  - Density: 5,020/km^{2} (13,000/sq mi)

Racial makeup (2011)
  - Black African: 98.3%
  - Coloured: 0.61%
  - White African: 0.53%
  - Indian or Asian: 0.22%
  - Other: 0.26%

First languages (2011)
  - isiZulu: 58%
  - isiNdebele: 15.3%
  - Sepedi: 5.4%
  - SiSwati: 4.6%
  - Xitsonga: 3.6%
  - isiXhosa: 3.4%
  - Sesotho: 2.5%
  - English: 2.2%
  - Sign language: 0.2%
  - Other: 3.5%
- Time zone: UTC+2 (SAST)
- PO box: 868017

Phola is a populated place in the Emalahleni Local Municipality, Nkangala District Municipality in the Mpumalanga Province of South Africa.

As of the 2011 census, Phola had a population of 31,885 distributed across 8,913 households.

== History ==
On 28 February 2017, protests took place in Phola over the issue of employment. One of the key demands was for more business opportunities and skill development centres in the area, as many looking for employment had to work at cities elsewhere. The protesters constructed road barricades out of burning tyres and set fire to several vehicles, including a bus. The local law enforcement made ten arrests and charged them with public violence.

== See also ==
- List of populated places in South Africa
