= Pambili =

- Country: South Africa
- Province: Mpumalanga
- District: Nkangala
- Municipality: Emalahleni

Area
  - Total: 0.41 km^{2} (0.16 sq mi)

Population (2011)
  - Total: 41
  - Density: 100/km^{2} (260/sq mi)

Racial makeup (2011)
  - Black African: 100%

First languages (2011)
  - SiSwati: 28%
  - Sepedi: 21%
  - isiZulu: 14%
  - Xitsonga: 12%
  - isiNdebele: 12%
  - Setswana: 9.5%
  - Sesotho: 2.2%
- Time zone: UTC+2 (SAST)
- PO box: 868013

Pambili is a populated place in the Emalahleni Local Municipality, Nkangala District Municipality in the Mpumalanga Province of South Africa.

As of the 2011 census, Pambili had 26 households.

== See also ==
- List of populated places in South Africa
