= Coronation (disambiguation) =

A coronation is the crowning ceremony of a monarch.

Coronation may also refer to:

== Christianity ==
- Coronation of Mary, Queen of Heaven and Earth, the fifth of the Glorious Mysteries of the Holy Rosary
- Coronation of the Virgin, crowning of the Virgin Mary in many famous Christian artworks

== Places ==
- Coronation, Alberta, a Canadian town
- Coronation, KwaZulu-Natal, Abaqulusi Local Municipality, South Africa
- Coronation, Mpumalanga, South Africa
- Coronation Glacier, a glacier on Baffin Island, Nunavut, Canada
- Coronation Gulf, Nunavut, Canada
- Coronation Peak, a mountain in New Zealand

== Other uses ==
- Coronation (2000 film), a Chilean film
- Coronation (2020 film), a documentary film shot in China
- Coronation (grape), a table grape originating from Canada (also called Sovereign Coronation)
- Coronation Street, the world's longest-running television soap opera still in production
- HMS Coronation (1685)
- LMS Princess Coronation Class 6220 Coronation, first locomotive of the LMS Princess Coronation Class
- Coronation, tune by Oliver Holden, first published in 1779, used for the hymn "All Hail the Power of Jesus' Name"
- Coronation (British horse), a Thoroughbred racehorse, winner of the 1841 Epsom Derby
- Coronation (French horse), a Thoroughbred racehorse, winner of the 1949 Prix de l'Arc de Triomphe
- Coronation rock, a named rock on the planet Mars near the landing site of the Curiosity rover
- Coronations (women's cricket), a women's cricket team from South Africa
- A kind of re-enactment event hosted by the Society for Creative Anachronism

== See also ==
- The Coronation (disambiguation)
- Coronation Park (disambiguation)
- Coronation Stakes (disambiguation)
