= Naauwpoort, Mpumalanga =

Naauwpoort
- Country: South Africa
- Province: Mpumalanga
- District: Nkangala
- Municipality: Emalahleni

Area
  - Total: 18.22 km^{2} (7.03 sq mi)

Population (2011)
  - Total: 170
  - Density: 9.3/km^{2} (24/sq mi)

Racial makeup (2011)
  - Black African: 99.4%
  - Other: 0.6%

First languages (2011)
  - Sepedi: 41%
  - isiZulu: 24%
  - SiSwati: 7%
  - Sesotho: 6%
  - isiNdebele: 6%
  - isiXhosa: 4%
  - Xitsonga: 3%
  - Setswana: 2%
  - English: 1%
  - Other: 6%
- Time zone: UTC+2 (SAST)
- PO box: 868011

Naauwpoort is a populated place in the Emalahleni Local Municipality, Nkangala District Municipality in the Mpumalanga Province of South Africa.

As of the 2011 census, Naauwpoort had 142 households.

== See also ==
- List of populated places in South Africa
