= Landau Colliery =

- Country: South Africa
- Province: Mpumalanga
- District: Nkangala
- Municipality: Emalahleni

Area
  - Total: 11.91 km^{2} (4.60 sq mi)

Population (2011)
  - Total: 1,029
  - Density: 86.40/km^{2} (223.8/sq mi)

Racial makeup (2011)
  - Black African: 91%
  - White African: 7%
  - Coloured: 1%
  - Indian or Asian: 0.13%
  - Other: 0.26%

First languages (2011)
  - isiXhosa: 19.6%
  - Sepedi: 17.8%
  - Xitsonga: 12.9%
  - isiZulu: 12.9%
  - Sesotho: 12.3%
  - Afrikaans: 9.7%
  - isiNdebele: 6.3%
  - SiSwati: 2.4%
  - Sign language: 0.2%
  - Other: 4.9%
- Time zone: UTC+2 (SAST)
- PO box: 868008

Landau Colliery is a populated place in the Emalahleni Local Municipality of the Nkangala District Municipality in the Mpumalanga Province of South Africa.

As of the 2011 census, Landau Colliery had 256 households.

== See also ==
- List of populated places in South Africa
