= Greenside Colliery =

- Country: South Africa
- Province: Mpumalanga
- District: Nkangala
- Municipality: Emalahleni

Area
  - Total: 14.97 km^{2} (5.78 sq mi)

Population (2011)
  - Total: 1,029
  - Density: 68.74/km^{2} (178.0/sq mi)

Racial makeup (2011)
  - Black African: 74.4%
  - White African: 23%
  - Coloured: 1.26%
  - Indian or Asian: 1.26%

First languages (2011)
  - Afrikaans: 21.9%
  - Sesotho: 14.2%
  - Xitsonga: 13.5%
  - Sepedi: 11.4%
  - isiXhosa: 11.3%
  - isiZulu: 9.3%
  - English: 7.3%
  - Setswana: 5.6%
  - Sign language: 0.1%
  - Other: 3.7%
- Time zone: UTC+2 (SAST)
- PO box: 868009

Greenside Colliery is a town in the Emalahleni Local Municipality of the Nkangala District Municipality in the Mpumalanga Province of South Africa. Numerous former mines are located in Greenside Colliery from when mining was the largest industry.

As of the 2011 census, Greenside Colliery had 428 households.

== See also ==
- List of populated places in South Africa
