= Springbok, Mpumalanga =

Springbok
- Country: South Africa
- Province: Mpumalanga
- District: Nkangala
- Municipality: Emalahleni

Area
  - Total: 30.39 km^{2} (11.73 sq mi)

Population (2011)
  - Total: 1,153
  - Density: 37.94/km^{2} (98.26/sq mi)

Racial makeup (2011)
  - Black African: 90%
  - White African: 8%
  - Coloured: 0.61%

First languages (2011)
  - isiZulu: 32.4%
  - isiXhosa: 15.8%
  - Sesotho: 14.3%
  - Afrikaans: 9.4%
  - Sepedi: 8.7%
  - Xitsonga: 6.4%
  - isiNdebele: 5.8%
  - SiSwati: 3.7%
  - Sign language: 0.09%
  - Other: 2.9%
- Time zone: UTC+2 (SAST)
- PO box: 868020

Springbok is a populated place in the Emalahleni Local Municipality of the Nkangala District Municipality in the Mpumalanga Province of South Africa.

As of the 2011 census, Springbok had 527 households.

== See also ==
- List of populated places in South Africa
