= Toitskraal =

- Location within Mpumalanga Location within South Africa
- Coordinates: 25.099°S 28.515°E
- Country: South Africa
- Province: Mpumalanga
- District: Nkangala
- Municipality: Dr JS Moroka

Area
  - Total: 4.34 km^{2} (1.68 sq mi)

Population (2011)
  - Total: 669
  - Density: 154/km^{2} (399/sq mi)

Racial makeup (2011)
  - Black African: 93.3%
  - Coloured: 0.7%
  - Indian/Asian: 3.9%
  - White: 1.8%
  - Other: 0.3%

First languages (2011)
  - Northern Sotho: 45.5%
  - Southern Ndebele: 13.7%
  - Sotho: 8.3%
  - English: 7.1%
  - Other: 25.3%
- Time zone: UTC+2 (SAST)

Toitskraal is a town in Nkangala District Municipality in the Mpumalanga province of South Africa.
