= KwaGuqa =

KwaGuqa (Ezinambeni)
- Location within Mpumalanga Location within South Africa
- Coordinates: 25.856°S 29.114°E
- Country: South Africa
- Province: Mpumalanga
- District: Nkangala
- Municipality: Emalahleni
  - Councillor: (ANC)

Area
  - Total: 22.15 km^{2} (8.55 sq mi)

Population (2011)
  - Total: 130,920
  - Density: 5,911/km^{2} (15,310/sq mi)

Racial makeup (2011)
  - Black African: 96.8%
  - Coloured: 2.5%
  - Indian/Asian: 0.2%
  - White: 0.1%
  - Other: 0.3%

First languages (2011)
  - Zulu: 47.3%
  - Northern Sotho: 18.3%
  - S. Ndebele: 9.6%
  - Swazi: 7.4%
  - Other: 17.4%
- Time zone: UTC+2 (SAST)
- Area code: 013

KwaGuqa is a township west of the industrial town of eMalahleni in the South African province of Mpumalanga.
