= Hendrina =

- Location within Mpumalanga Location within South Africa
- Coordinates: 26°9′S 29°43′E
- Country: South Africa
- Province: Mpumalanga
- District: Nkangala
- Municipality: Steve Tshwete

Area
  - Total: 6.28 km^{2} (2.42 sq mi)

Population (2011)
  - Total: 2,359
  - Density: 376/km^{2} (973/sq mi)

Racial makeup (2011)
  - Black African: 29.2%
  - Coloured: 1.5%
  - Indian/Asian: 1.8%
  - White: 66.1%
  - Other: 1.4%

First languages (2011)
  - Afrikaans: 69.0%
  - Zulu: 11.2%
  - English: 5.8%
  - Swazi: 2.4%
  - Other: 11.6%
- Time zone: UTC+2 (SAST)
- Postal code (street): 1095
- PO box: 1095
- Area code: 013

Hendrina is a town in Nkangala District Municipality, in the Mpumalanga province of South Africa. The town is 53 km (32.9 mi) northwest of Ermelo, 40 km (24.8 mi) southwest of Carolina, and 53 km (32.9 mi) southeast of Middelburg.

== History ==
Hendrina was established in 1914 on Garsfontein Farm and named after Hendrina Beukes, wife of Gert Beukes, who first owned the farm. It was administered by a health committee and village council from 1919 to 1926.

== Economy ==
Hendrina's main economic activities are coal mining and diversified farming of beans, potatoes, and maize. It is the location of two of the largest power stations operated by Eskom: Arnot Power Station and Hendrina Power Station.

== Sources ==
- Erasmus, B.P.J. (1995). Op Pad in Suid-Afrika. New York: Jonathan Ball Publishers. ISBN 1-86842-026-4.
- Rosenthal, Eric (1967). Ensiklopedie van Suidelike Afrika. Cape Town/Johannesburg: Juta.
- https://www.mpumalanga.com/places-to-go/grass-wetlands/hendrina
