= Mbibana =

- Location within Mpumalanga Location within South Africa
- Coordinates: 25.173°S 28.895°E
- Country: South Africa
- Province: Mpumalanga
- District: Nkangala
- Municipality: Dr JS Moroka

Area
  - Total: 16.73 km^{2} (6.46 sq mi)

Population (2001)
  - Total: 6,098
  - Density: 364.5/km^{2} (944.0/sq mi)

Racial makeup (2001)
  - Black African: 99.6%
  - Coloured: 0.2%
  - White: 0.1%

First languages (2001)
  - Northern Sotho: 47.6%
  - Southern Ndebele: 14.3%
  - Tsonga: 13.7%
  - Sotho: 7.8%
  - Other: ZU%
- Time zone: UTC+2 (SAST)

Mbibana is a town in Nkangala District Municipality in the Mpumalanga province of South Africa.
