= Klarinet, Emalahleni =

Klarinet
- Location within Mpumalanga Location within South Africa Location within Africa
- Coordinates: 25.969°S 29.273°E
- Country: South Africa
- Province: Mpumalanga
- District: Nkangala
- Municipality: Emalahleni

Area
  - Total: 3.12 km^{2} (1.20 sq mi)

Population (2011)
  - Total: 9,822
  - Density: 3,150/km^{2} (8,150/sq mi)

Racial makeup (2011)
  - Black African: 98.0%
  - Coloured: 1.4%
  - Indian/Asian: 0.2%
  - White: 0.1%
  - Other: 0.3%

First languages (2011)
  - Zulu: 44.5%
  - Northern Sotho: 22.2%
  - Southern Ndebele: 8.5%
  - Swazi: 5.5%
  - Other: 19.2%
- Time zone: UTC+2 (SAST)

Klarinet is a town north of the city centre of eMalahleni (previously known as Witbank).

== Location ==
The town lies within the Emalahleni Local Municipality in the Nkangala District Municipality in the Mpumalanga province of South Africa.
