= Coronation, Mpumalanga =

Coronation
- Country: South Africa
- Province: Mpumalanga
- District: Nkangala
- Municipality: Emalahleni

Area
  - Total: 2.56 km^{2} (0.99 sq mi)

Population (2011)
  - Total: 12,598
  - Density: 4,920/km^{2} (12,700/sq mi)

Racial makeup (2011)
  - Black African: 99.2%
  - White African: 0.06%
  - Coloured: 0.06%
  - Indian or Asian: 0.04%
  - Other: 0.5%

First languages (2011)
  - Sepedi: 42%
  - isiZulu: 15.3%
  - Xitsonga: 12.3%
  - SiSwati: 11.8%
  - isiNdebele: 5.8%
  - Sesotho: 3%
  - isiXhosa: 1.7%
  - English: 1.5%
  - Sign language: 0.2%
  - Other: 6.0%
- Time zone: UTC+2 (SAST)
- PO box: 868003007

Coronation is a populated place in the Emalahleni Local Municipality, Nkangala District Municipality in the Mpumalanga Province of South Africa.

As of the 2011 census, Coronation had 6,658 households.

== See also ==
- List of populated places in South Africa
