= Mhluzi =

- Location within Mpumalanga Location within South Africa
- Coordinates: 25°45′32″S 29°25′47″E
- Country: South Africa
- Province: Mpumalanga
- District: Nkangala
- Municipality: Steve Tshwete

Area
  - Total: 10.29 km^{2} (3.97 sq mi)
- Elevation: 1,490 m (4,890 ft)

Population (2011)
  - Total: 76,462
  - Density: 7,431/km^{2} (19,250/sq mi)

Racial makeup (2011)
  - Black African: 98.5%
  - Coloured: 0.7%
  - Indian/Asian: 0.2%
  - White: 0.2%
  - Other: 0.4%

First languages (2011)
  - Zulu: 43.0%
  - S. Ndebele: 18.0%
  - Northern Sotho: 16.7%
  - Swazi: 6.6%
  - Other: 15.7%
- Time zone: UTC+2 (SAST)
- Postal code (street): 1050
- PO box: 1055

Mhluzi is a township just west of the large farming and industrial town Middelburg in the South African province of Mpumalanga.

It has 8 primary schools and 6 secondary.

== Background and History ==
The Town Councils of Middelburg and Mhluzi, as well as the Management Committees for Eastdene (Indian area) and Nasaret (Coloured area according to apartheid laws) amalgamated during 1994 to form the Transitional Local Council for Middelburg.

Middelburg was the first town in Mpumalanga to amalgamate in terms of the Local Government Transition Act, and the proclamation to establish the new TLC appeared in the Mpumalanga Provincial Gazette, No 2/1994 on 16 November 1994.

== Education ==
=== Primary schools ===
- Manyano Primary School
- Thušanang Primary School
- Mvuzo Primary School
- Mhluzi Primary School
- Elusindisweni Primary School
- Makhathini Primary School
- Mthombeni primary school
- Zikhuphule primary school

=== Secondary schools ===
- Sozama Secondary School
- Sofunda Secondary School
- Mphanama comprehensive high school
- L.D Moetanalo high school
- Ekwazini secondary school
