= Steve Tshwete Local Municipality elections =

The Steve Tshwete Local Municipality is a Local Municipality in Mpumalanga, South Africa. The council consists of fifty-eight members elected by mixed-member proportional representation. Twenty-nine councillors are elected by first-past-the-post voting in twenty-nine wards, while the remaining twenty-nine are chosen from party lists so that the total number of party representatives is proportional to the number of votes received. In the election of 1 November 2021 no party won a majority on the council. The African National Congress (ANC) was the largest party, winning twenty-one seats.

== Results ==
The following table shows the composition of the council after past elections.

Event	ACDP	ANC	DA	EFF	FF+	Other	Total
2000 election	1	33	12	—	—	1	47
2006 election	1	29	11	—	1	5	47
2011 election	0	39	17	—	1	1	58
2016 election	0	32	17	7	2	0	58
2021 election	0	21	17	9	3	8	58

== December 2000 election ==
The following table shows the results of the 2000 election.

Party	Ward			List			Total seats
Party	Votes	%	Seats	Votes	%	Seats	Total seats
African National Congress	23,967	68.20	19	24,229	69.01	14	33
Democratic Alliance	8,834	25.14	5	8,923	25.41	7	12
Middelburg Residents Organisation	864	2.46	0	981	2.79	1	1
African Christian Democratic Party	609	1.73	0	742	2.11	1	1
Independent candidates	808	2.30	0				0
Inkatha Freedom Party	61	0.17	0	236	0.67	0	0
Total	35,143	100.00	24	35,111	100.00	23	47
Valid votes	35,143	98.03		35,111	97.94		
Invalid/blank votes	706	1.97		739	2.06		
Total votes	35,849	100.00		35,850	100.00		
Registered voters/turnout	77,723	46.12		77,723	46.13		

== March 2006 election ==
The following table shows the results of the 2006 election.

Party	Ward			List			Total seats
Party	Votes	%	Seats	Votes	%	Seats	Total seats
African National Congress	22,850	61.99	21	23,087	62.84	8	29
Democratic Alliance	8,319	22.57	3	8,239	22.43	8	11
Greater Middelburg Residents Association	3,520	9.55	0	3,345	9.11	4	4
Freedom Front Plus	776	2.11	0	851	2.32	1	1
Middelburg Residents Organisation	680	1.84	0	730	1.99	1	1
African Christian Democratic Party	531	1.44	0	486	1.32	1	1
Inkatha Freedom Party	149	0.40	0				0
Pan Africanist Congress of Azania	35	0.09	0				0
Total	36,860	100.00	24	36,738	100.00	23	47
Valid votes	36,860	97.59		36,738	97.05		
Invalid/blank votes	912	2.41		1,117	2.95		
Total votes	37,772	100.00		37,855	100.00		
Registered voters/turnout	85,755	44.05		85,755	44.14		

== May 2011 election ==
The following table shows the results of the 2011 election.

Party	Ward			List			Total seats
Party	Votes	%	Seats	Votes	%	Seats	Total seats
African National Congress	35,980	67.57	22	36,284	68.06	17	39
Democratic Alliance	15,152	28.45	7	14,962	28.07	10	17
Congress of the People	935	1.76	0	948	1.78	1	1
Freedom Front Plus	333	0.63	0	403	0.76	1	1
African Christian Democratic Party	412	0.77	0	290	0.54	0	0
National Freedom Party	260	0.49	0	298	0.56	0	0
Pan Africanist Congress of Azania	115	0.22	0	123	0.23	0	0
Independent candidates	65	0.12	0				0
Total	53,252	100.00	29	53,308	100.00	29	58
Valid votes	53,252	98.65		53,308	98.77		
Invalid/blank votes	727	1.35		663	1.23		
Total votes	53,979	100.00		53,971	100.00		
Registered voters/turnout	98,060	55.05		98,060	55.04		

== August 2016 election ==
The following table shows the results of the 2016 election.

Party	Ward			List			Total seats
Party	Votes	%	Seats	Votes	%	Seats	Total seats
African National Congress	31,964	55.27	23	32,160	55.71	9	32
Democratic Alliance	16,911	29.24	6	16,692	28.91	11	17
Economic Freedom Fighters	6,439	11.13	0	6,588	11.41	7	7
Freedom Front Plus	1,485	2.57	0	1,482	2.57	2	2
African Christian Democratic Party	288	0.50	0	269	0.47	0	0
Independent candidates	460	0.80	0				0
African People's Convention	136	0.24	0	246	0.43	0	0
United Constructive Party	87	0.15	0	81	0.14	0	0
Congress of the People	24	0.04	0	117	0.20	0	0
Sindawonye Progressive Party	40	0.07	0	94	0.16	0	0
Total	57,834	100.00	29	57,729	100.00	29	58
Valid votes	57,834	98.73		57,729	98.73		
Invalid/blank votes	741	1.27		741	1.27		
Total votes	58,575	100.00		58,470	100.00		
Registered voters/turnout	110,703	52.91		110,703	52.82		

=== By-elections from August 2016 to November 2021 ===
The following by-elections were held to fill vacant ward seats in the period from August 2016 to November 2021.

Date	Ward	Party of the previous councillor	Party of the newly elected councillor
3 October 2018	25	African National Congress	African National Congress

In the October 2018 by-election, the ANC candidate retained ward 25 for the party. The ANC's share dropped from 79% in the 2016 election to 70%, while the Economic Freedom Fighters (EFF) candidate almost doubled their party's share of the vote to 30%.

== November 2021 election ==
The following table shows the results of the 2021 election.

Party	Ward			List			Total seats
Party	Votes	%	Seats	Votes	%	Seats	Total seats
African National Congress	17,051	36.41	21	17,307	37.29	0	21
Democratic Alliance	13,252	28.30	7	13,202	28.44	10	17
Economic Freedom Fighters	6,951	14.84	0	6,971	15.02	9	9
Middelburg and Hendrina Residents Front	4,955	10.58	0	5,382	11.60	7	7
Freedom Front Plus	2,567	5.48	0	2,566	5.53	3	3
Independent candidates	1,338	2.86	1				1
African Christian Democratic Party	278	0.59	0	353	0.76	0	0
Patriotic Alliance	193	0.41	0	247	0.53	0	0
African Transformation Movement	141	0.30	0	183	0.39	0	0
United Independent Movement	41	0.09	0	131	0.28	0	0
Spectrum National Party	57	0.12	0	43	0.09	0	0
Bolsheviks Party of South Africa	4	0.01	0	29	0.06	0	0
Disability and Older Person Political Party	5	0.01	0				0
Total	46,833	100.00	29	46,414	100.00	29	58
Valid votes	46,833	98.07		46,414	98.04		
Invalid/blank votes	922	1.93		929	1.96		
Total votes	47,755	100.00		47,343	100.00		
Registered voters/turnout	108,499	44.01		108,499	43.63		

=== By-elections from November 2021 ===
The following by-elections were held to fill vacant ward seats in the period since November 2021.

Date	Ward	Party of the previous councillor	Party of the newly elected councillor
28 Aug 2024	10	African National Congress	African National Congress
