= Ikageng, Mpumalanga =

Ikageng
- Country: South Africa
- Province: Mpumalanga
- District: Nkangala
- Municipality: Emalahleni

Area
  - Total: 0.25 km^{2} (0.097 sq mi)

Population (2011)
  - Total: 65
  - Density: 260/km^{2} (670/sq mi)

Racial makeup (2011)
  - Black African: 100%

First languages (2011)
  - isiZulu: 38.4%
  - isiXhosa: 27.6%
  - Sepedi: 10.7%
  - Setswana: 9.2%
  - Tshivenda: 9.2%
  - English: 1.5%
  - SiSwati: 1.5%
  - Other: 1.5%
- Time zone: UTC+2 (SAST)
- PO box: 868012

Ikageng is a populated place in the Emalahleni Local Municipality of the Nkangala District Municipality in the Mpumalanga Province of South Africa.

As of the 2011 census, Ikageng had 17 households.

== See also ==
- List of populated places in South Africa
