= List of South African provinces by population density =

Since the election of 27 April 1994, South Africa has been divided into nine provinces. They vary widely in population density, from the highly urbanized Gauteng with nearly 700 people per square kilometre, to the mostly-desert Northern Cape with less than four people per square kilometre. The following table shows the provincial population density according to the Statistics South Africa Census.

Rank	Province	Population	Area (km²)	Density (per km²)
1	Gauteng	15,099,422 (census, 2022)	18,178.0	831
2	KwaZulu-Natal	12,423,907 (census, 2022)	94,361.0	132
3	Mpumalanga	5,143,324 (census, 2022)	76,495.0	67.2
4	Western Cape	7,113,776 (est, 2021)	129,462.0	54.9
5	Limpopo	6,572,720 (census, 2022)	125,754.0	52.3
6	Eastern Cape	7,230,204 (census, 2022)	168,966.0	42.8
7	North West	3,804,548 (census, 2022)	104,882	36.3
8	Free State	2,964,412 (census, 2022)	129,825.0	22.8
9	Northern Cape	1,355,946 (census, 2022)	372,889.0	3.64
South Africa		62,027,503 (census, 2022)	1,221,037	50.8

== Historical data ==
Since the creation of the current provinces in 1994 there have been four censuses, in 1996, 2001, 2011, and 2022. The results from the 2022 Census are due to be released on 10 October 2023.

Province	Census 1996	Census 2001	Census 2011
Gauteng	432.0	519.5	675.1
KwaZulu-Natal	91.4	102.3	108.8
Mpumalanga	35.2	39.3	52.8
Western Cape	30.6	35.0	45.0
Limpopo	39.8	42.6	43.0
Eastern Cape	37.2	38.0	38.8
North West	28.8	31.5	33.5
Free State	20.3	20.9	21.1
Northern Cape	2.3	2.3	3.1
South Africa	33.3	36.8	42.4

== See also ==
- List of South African provinces by population
- List of South African provinces by area
