= Petronel Nieuwoudt =

South African wildlife conservationist

- Born: South Africa
- Occupation: wildlife conservation

Petronel Nieuwoudt is a South African wildlife conservationist. In 2011, she established the Care For Wild rhinoceros sanctuary in Mpumalanga, South Africa. It is the largest such sanctuary in the world. She is also the chief executive officer of the foundation.

== Early life ==
Raised in the 1970s on a rural farm in Roedtan, Limpopo, Nieuwoudt attended Rand Afrikaans University between 1988 and 1991. Her father ran the farm; her mother was a teacher.

== Career ==
Niewoudt joined the public-relations department of the South African Police Service's Endangered Species Protection Unit in 1991, and later became captain. She founded The Game Capture School, which educated people on the capture, treatment and management of wildlife.

She next founded Sondela Wildlife Centre, in Bela-Bela, which was in operation from 2005 to 2007, followed by Tamboti Wildlife Centre, in Mookoopong, between 2007 and 2010.

In 2011, Petronel relocated from Limpopo to Mpumalanga, where she established Care For Wild Africa, a rehabilitation centre for indigenous African wildlife which has become the largest rhinoceros sanctuary in the world. The sanctuary gained its first orphan rhinoceros the following year. Four others followed shortly thereafter.

In 2014, South African National Parks invited Petronel to form a partnership to assist in the rescue, rehabilitation and protection of orphaned animals. Nieuwoudt set in motion a registration of her sanctuary as a non-profit organisation.
