= Elandspark =

- Location within Gauteng Location within South Africa
- Coordinates: 26.243°S 28.110°E
- Country: South Africa
- Province: Gauteng
- Municipality: City of Johannesburg
- Main Place: Johannesburg

Area
  - Total: 2.38 km^{2} (0.92 sq mi)

Population (2011)
  - Total: 4,789
  - Density: 2,010/km^{2} (5,210/sq mi)

Racial makeup (2011)
  - Black African: 46.8%
  - Coloured: 8.4%
  - Indian/Asian: 15.7%
  - White: 27.2%
  - Other: 1.8%

First languages (2011)
  - English: 41.9%
  - Afrikaans: 15.8%
  - Zulu: 13.9%
  - Sotho: 6.2%
  - Other: 22.2%
- Time zone: UTC+2 (SAST)
- Postal code (street): 2197

Elandspark is a suburb of Johannesburg, South Africa. It is located in Region F of the City of Johannesburg Metropolitan Municipality.

== Demographics ==
According to the South African National Census of 2011, 3,334 people lived in Elandspark.

52.1% were White, 29.5% Black African, 12.4% Coloured and 5.9% Indian or Asian.

47.6% spoke English, 23.7% Afrikaans, 10.9% Zulu, 4.7% Sotho, 3.1% Tswana, 3.0% Xhosa, 2.9% Northern Sotho, 1.1% Tsonga, 0.6% Venda, 0.3% Swazi, 0.3% Southern Ndebele and 1.7% some other language as their first language.
