= List of South African provinces by population =

Since the election of 27 April 1994, South Africa has been divided into nine provinces. They vary widely in population, from the mostly-urban Gauteng, which contains over 20% of the national population, to the mostly-desert Northern Cape, which contains less than 3%. The following table shows the provincial populations according to the 2011 National Census, the 2016 Community Survey, and the most recent 2022 Census.

== List ==
Rank	Province	Census 2011		2016 community survey		Census 2022	
Rank	Province	Population	Percentage	Population	Percentage	Population	Percentage
1	Gauteng	12,272,263	23.7	13,399,724	24.1	15,099,422	24.3
2	KwaZulu-Natal	10,267,300	19.8	11,065,240	19.9	12,423,907	20.0
3	Western Cape	5,822,734	11.2	6,279,730	11.3	7,433,019	12.0
4	Eastern Cape	6,562,053	12.7	6,996,976	12.6	7,230,204	11.6
5	Limpopo	5,404,868	10.4	5,799,090	10.4	6,572,720	10.6
6	Mpumalanga	4,039,939	7.8	4,335,964	7.8	5,143,324	8.3
7	North West	3,509,953	6.8	3,748,435	6.7	3,804,548	6.1
8	Free State	2,745,590	5.3	2,834,714	5.1	2,964,412	4.8
9	Northern Cape	1,145,861	2.2	1,193,780	2.1	1,355,946	2.2
South Africa		51,770,561	100.0	55,653,654	100.0	62,027,503	100.0

== Historical data ==
Since the creation of the current provinces in 1994 there have been three censuses, in 1996, 2001 and 2011.

Province	Census 1996	Percentage	Census 2001	Percentage	Census 2011	Percentage
Gauteng	7,348,423	18.1	8,837,178	19.7	12,272,263	23.7
KwaZulu-Natal	8,417,021	20.7	9,426,017	21.0	10,267,300	19.8
Eastern Cape	6,302,525	15.5	6,436,763	14.4	6,562,053	12.7
Western Cape	3,956,875	9.7	4,524,335	10.1	5,822,734	11.2
Limpopo	4,929,368	12.1	5,273,642	11.8	5,404,868	10.4
Mpumalanga	2,800,711	6.9	3,122,990	7.0	4,039,939	7.8
North West	3,354,825	8.3	3,669,349	8.2	3,509,953	6.8
Free State	2,633,504	6.5	2,706,775	6.0	2,745,590	5.3
Northern Cape	840,321	2.1	822,727	1.8	1,145,861	2.2
South Africa	40,583,573	100.0	44,819,776	100.0	51,770,561	100.0

== See also ==
- List of South African provinces by population density
