= Ikageng =

Ikageng may refer to:

- Ikageng, Mpumalanga
- Ikageng, North West
