= Care For Wild =

Care For Wild Rhino Sanctuary
- Date opened: 2011 (15 years ago)
- Location: Barberton, South Africa
- Land area: 28,000 hectares (69,000 acres)
- Director: Petronel Nieuwoudt, Chris de Bruno Austin
- Website: www.careforwild.co.za

Care For Wild is the largest rhinoceros sanctuary in the world, spanning 28,000 hectares (69,000 acres) in the greater Barberton Nature Reserve in Mpumalanga, South Africa. The exact location of the sanctuary is not disclosed for security reasons. Opened in 2011, by its founder Petronel Nieuwoudt, it was started to provide care and rehabilitation to a wide range of animals, especially the critically endangered black rhinoceros and white rhinoceros, whose numbers continue to decline due to rhino poaching. Other than rhinoceros, the sanctuary is home to lions, nyala, duiker, owl, hippopotamus, and others.

Care For Wild rescues orphaned rhinos mainly from the Kruger National Park, which is still heavily affected by rhino poaching. They also rescue orphaned rhinos from the neighbouring game reserves in the Mpumalanga and Limpopo region.

Care For Wild is a nonprofit organisation.
