= The Coronation =

The Coronation may refer to:

- The Coronation (play), 1630s play
- The Coronation (train), 1937 British railway train
- The Coronation (novel), 2000 novel
- The Coronation (film), 2018 BBC documentary

== See also ==
- Coronation (disambiguation)
