= Steve Tshwete Local Municipality =

Steve Tshwete
- Local municipality
- Seal

- Location in Mpumalanga
- Coordinates: 25°50′S 29°35′E
- Country: South Africa
- Province: Mpumalanga
- District: Nkangala
- Seat: Middelburg
- Wards: 29

Government
  - Type: Municipal council

Area
  - Total: 3,976 km^{2} (1,535 sq mi)

Population (2023)
  - Total: 229,831
  - Density: 57.80/km^{2} (149.7/sq mi)

Racial makeup (2011)
  - Black African: 73.6%
  - Coloured: 2.6%
  - Indian/Asian: 1.6%
  - White: 21.8%

First languages (2011)
  - Zulu: 34.4%
  - Afrikaans: 29.6%
  - Southern Ndebele: 14.9%
  - Northern Sotho: 10.8%
  - Other: 23.4%
- Time zone: UTC+2 (SAST)
- Municipal code: MP313

Steve Tshwete Municipality (Zulu: UMasipala iSteve Tshwete; Afrikaans: Steve Tshwete Munisipaliteit; Southern Ndebele: UMasipaladi weSteve Tshwete; Northern Sotho: Mmasepala wa Steve Tshwete), formerly Middelburg Municipality, is a local municipality within the Nkangala District Municipality, in the Mpumalanga province of South Africa. The seat is Middelburg. The local municipality was one of the four to have passed the 2009-10 audit by the Auditor-General of South Africa, who deemed it to have a clean administration.

The municipality is named after Steve Tshwete, an ANC activist imprisoned by the apartheid authorities on Robben Island from February 1964 to 1983.

== Main places ==
The 2011 census divided the municipality into the following main places:

Place	Code	Area (km^{2})	Population	Most spoken language
Hendrina	869013	6.28	2,359	Afrikaans
Kranspoort, MP	869001001	6.39	153	Afrikaans
KwaZamokuhle	869012	3.79	20,427	Zulu
Mhluzi	869004	10.29	76,462	Zulu
Middelburg	869005	117.40	87,348	Afrikaans
Piet Tlou	869003	6.57	5,039	Southern Ndebele
Remainder of the municipality	869002	3,775.34	26,079	

== Politics ==
The municipal council consists of fifty-eight members elected by mixed-member proportional representation. Twenty-nine are elected by first-past-the-post voting in twenty-nine wards, while the remaining twenty-nine are chosen from party lists so that the total number of party representatives is proportional to the number of votes received. In the election of 1 November 2021 no party won a majority on the council. The African National Congress (ANC) was the largest party, winning twenty-one seats.

The following table shows the results of the election.

Party	Ward			List			Total seats
Party	Votes	%	Seats	Votes	%	Seats	Total seats
African National Congress	17,051	36.41	21	17,307	37.29	0	21
Democratic Alliance	13,252	28.30	7	13,202	28.44	10	17
Economic Freedom Fighters	6,951	14.84	0	6,971	15.02	9	9
Middelburg and Hendrina Residents Front	4,955	10.58	0	5,382	11.60	7	7
Freedom Front Plus	2,567	5.48	0	2,566	5.53	3	3
Independent candidates	1,338	2.86	1				1
7 other parties	719	1.54	0	986	2.12	0	0
Total	46,833	100.00	29	46,414	100.00	29	58
Valid votes	46,833	98.07		46,414	98.04		
Invalid/blank votes	922	1.93		929	1.96		
Total votes	47,755	100.00		47,343	100.00		
Registered voters/turnout	108,499	44.01		108,499	43.63		

== Municipal services ==
Middelburg's municipal workers started sporadic strikes in September 2021, and these continued into 2022 which affected several services. Licenses could not be renewed at the license office, property transfers could not be done, refuse was not removed and security guards shot two strikers, while political parties chose not to intervene.
