= Emalahleni Local Municipality, Mpumalanga =

eMalahleni eZinambeni
- Local municipality
- eNambeni
- Seal

- Location in Mpumalanga
- Coordinates: 26°0′S 29°10′E
- Country: South Africa
- Province: Mpumalanga
- District: Nkangala
- Seat: eMalahleni
- Wards: 34

Government
  - Type: Municipal council
  - Mayor: Connie Kantshalintshali (ANC)

Area
  - Total: 2,678 km^{2} (1,034 sq mi)

Population (2023)
  - Total: 395,466
  - Density: 147.7/km^{2} (382.5/sq mi)

Racial makeup (2023)
  - Black African: 81.3%
  - White: 15.7%
  - Coloured: 1.7%
  - Indian/Asian: 0.9%

First languages (2011)
  - IsiZulu: 38.6%
  - Afrikaans: 14.9%
  - Sepedi: 11.3%
  - IsiNdebele: 8.9%
  - SiSwati: 5.8%
  - English: 5.6%
  - Xitsonga: 3.5%
  - Sesotho: 3.2%
  - IsiXhosa: 3.1%
  - Other: 4%
- Time zone: UTC+2 (SAST)
- Municipal code: MP312

eMalahleni Municipality (Zulu: UMasipala wase Malahleni; Afrikaans: eMlahleni Munisipaliteit; Northern Sotho: Mmasepala wa eMalahleni) is a local municipality within the Nkangala District Municipality, in the Mpumalanga province of South Africa. eMalahleni is a Nguni word meaning place of coal.

== Main places ==
The 2001 census divided the municipality into the following main places:

Place	Code	Area (km^{2})	Population	Most spoken language
Boschmans Colliery	80901	0.63	3	Xhosa
Clewer	80902	36.52	2,657	Zulu
Coalville	80903	1.33	154	Afrikaans
Cologne	80904	0.45	120	Zulu
Coronation	80905	0.96	6	Southern Ndebele
eMalahleni	80948	240.39	61,093	Afrikaans
Greenside Colliery	80907	10.86	1,314	Afrikaans
Hlalanikahle	80908	4.38	27,092	Zulu
Ikageng	80909	0.46	311	Zulu
Kendal	80910	32.65	285	Zulu
Khutala Colliery	80911	0.58	0	-
Klarinet	80912	0.52	195	Northern Sotho
Klipplaat	80913	0.14	249	Zulu
Klippoortjie	80914	0.99	382	Zulu
Kriel	80915	37.87	11,695	Afrikaans
KwaGuqa Part 1	80916	1.87	8,005	Northern Sotho
KwaGuqa Part 2	80918	8.57	67,461	Zulu
KwaGuqa Part 3	80919	0.09	189	Zulu
KwaGuqa Part 4	80920	0.21	1,997	Northern Sotho
KwaGuqa Part 5	80917	0.05	510	Northern Sotho
Landau Colliery	80921	4.71	1,707	Zulu
Lehlaka Park	80922	1.85	2,867	Zulu
Lekama	80923	0.48	283	Zulu
Madressa	80924	0.63	189	Zulu
Matla Coal Mine	80925	1.04	1,207	Xhosa
Naauwpoort	80926	0.50	1,782	Zulu
New Largo	80927	26.50	797	Zulu
Ogies	80928	1.50	897	Afrikaans
Pambili	80929	0.43	108	Northern Sotho
Paxton	80930	1.00	1,410	Zulu
Phoenix Colliery	80931	2.69	99	Afrikaans
Phola	80932	3.26	22,864	Zulu
Pine Ridge	80933	1.07	898	English
Reedstream Park	80934	1.19	905	Zulu
Rethabile	80935	1.12	762	Xhosa
Rietspruit Opencast Mine	80936	51.22	292	Southern Ndebele
Saaiwater	80937	0.12	270	Zulu
Soetvelde	80938	0.21	118	Zulu
Springbok	80939	0.90	369	Afrikaans
Tavistock Colliery	80940	0.66	0	-
Thubelihle	80941	0.96	5,746	Zulu
Travistock South	80943	0.47	307	Afrikaans
Travistock	80942	0.47	709	Zulu
Tweefontein	80944	0.93	650	Afrikaans
Vandyksdrif	80945	2.56	2,010	Sotho
Voltargo	80946	0.43	237	Zulu
Vosman	80947	2.15	13,126	Zulu
Witbank Consolidated Colliery	80949	0.13	249	Tsonga
Witcons	80950	0.63	184	Afrikaans
Wolwekrans	80951	1.40	463	Afrikaans
Zaaiwater	80952	0.23	21	Southern Ndebele
Remainder of the municipality	80906	2,182.06	31,209	Zulu

== Politics ==
The municipal council consists of sixty-eight members elected by mixed-member proportional representation. Thirty-four are elected by first-past-the-post voting in thirty-four wards, while the remaining thirty-four are chosen from party lists so that the total number of party representatives is proportional to the number of votes received. In the election of 1 November 2021 the African National Congress (ANC) won a majority of thirty-five seats on the council.

The following table shows the results of the election.

Party	Ward			List			Total seats
Party	Votes	%	Seats	Votes	%	Seats	Total seats
African National Congress	36,302	50.33	28	36,665	50.83	7	35
Economic Freedom Fighters	14,536	20.15	0	14,994	20.79	14	14
Democratic Alliance	13,276	18.41	6	13,198	18.30	7	13
Freedom Front Plus	4,039	5.60	0	3,944	5.47	4	4
Independent candidates	1,778	2.46	0				0
African Independent Congress	614	0.85	0	780	1.08	1	1
African Christian Democratic Party	664	0.92	0	635	0.88	1	1
10 other parties	923	1.28	0	1,921	2.66	0	0
Total	72,132	100.00	34	72,137	100.00	34	68
Valid votes	72,132	98.22		72,137	98.10		
Invalid/blank votes	1,307	1.78		1,398	1.90		
Total votes	73,439	100.00		73,535	100.00		
Registered voters/turnout	186,763	39.32		186,763	39.37		
