= Dr JS Moroka Local Municipality =

Dr JS Moroka
- Local municipality
- Seal

- Location in Mpumalanga
- Coordinates: 25°5′S 28°50′E
- Country: South Africa
- Province: Mpumalanga
- District: Nkangala
- Seat: Siyabuswa
- Wards: 31

Government
  - Type: Municipal council
  - Mayor: Grace Tinny Mthimunye

Area
  - Total: 1,416 km^{2} (547 sq mi)

Population (2011)
  - Total: 249,705
  - Density: 176.3/km^{2} (456.7/sq mi)

Racial makeup (2011)
  - Black African: 99.4%
  - Coloured: 0.1%
  - Indian/Asian: 0.3%
  - White: 0.1%

First languages (2011)
  - Southern Ndebele: 36.2%
  - Northern Sotho: 30.7%
  - Tswana: 17.3%
  - Tsonga: 5.0%
  - Other: 10.8%
- Time zone: UTC+2 (SAST)
- Municipal code: MP316

Dr JS Moroka Municipality (Southern Ndebele: UMasipaladi weDr JS Moroka; Northern Sotho: Mmasepala wa Dr JS Moroka; Tswana: Mmasepala wa Dr JS Moroka) is a local municipality within the Nkangala District Municipality, in the Mpumalanga province of South Africa. The seat is Siyabuswa. It is named after James Moroka, 8th President-General of the African National Congress.

== Main places ==
The 2001 census divided the municipality into the following main places:

Place	Code	Area (km^{2})	Population	Most spoken language
Dr JS Moroka	81301	186.37	185	Northern Sotho
Kameelpoort	81302	0.93	1,639	Northern Sotho
Mbibana	81303	16.73	6,098	Northern Sotho
Mdutjana	81304	260.44	84,756	Southern Ndebele
Moretele	81305	915.02	112,330	Tswana
Moutse 2	81306	4.40	0	-
Siyabuswa	81307	13.56	26,273	Southern Ndebele
Toitskraal	81308	0.47	207	Southern Ndebele
Vaalbank	81309	3.85	11,818	Northern Sotho

== Politics ==
The municipal council consists of sixty-two members elected by mixed-member proportional representation. Thirty-one are elected by first-past-the-post voting in thirty-one wards, while the remaining thirty-one are chosen from party lists so that the total number of party representatives is proportional to the number of votes received. In the election of 3 August 2016 the African National Congress (ANC) won a majority of forty-three seats on the council.

The following table shows the results of the 2016 election.

Party	Votes				Seats		
Party	Ward	List	Total	%	Ward	List	Total
ANC	46,379	46,985	93,364	67.8	30	13	43
EFF	11,057	10,784	21,841	15.9	0	10	10
DA	4,257	4,432	8,689	6.3	0	4	4
Independent	4,387	–	4,387	3.2	1	–	1
AIC	275	1,438	1,713	1.2	0	1	1
PAC	675	684	1,359	1.0	0	1	1
Forum 4 Service Delivery	508	531	1,039	0.8	0	1	1
APC	366	594	960	0.7	0	1	1
Others	1,811	2,535	4,346	3.2	0	0	0
Total	69,715	67,983	137,698	100.0	31	31	62
Spoilt votes	1,505	1,922	3,427				

In a by-election held on 8 January 2019, a ward previously held by the ANC was won by an independent candidate. Council composition was reconfigured as seen below:

Party	Ward	PR list	Total
ANC	29	13	42
EFF	0	10	10
DA	0	4	4
Independent	2	–	2
AIC	0	1	1
APC	0	1	1
Forum 4 Service Delivery	0	1	1
PAC	0	1	1
Total	31	31	62
