= List of South African provinces by area =

Since the election of 27 April 1994, South Africa has been divided into nine provinces. They vary widely in size, from the Northern Cape, which covers nearly one-third of the country's land area, to Gauteng, which takes up a mere 1.5%.

Rank	Province	Area (km^{2})	Percentage
1	Northern Cape	372,889	30.5
2	Eastern Cape	168,966	13.8
3	Free State	129,825	10.6
4	Western Cape	129,462	10.6
5	Limpopo	125,755	10.2
6	North West	104,882	8.6
7	KwaZulu-Natal	94,361	7.7
8	Mpumalanga	76,495	6.3
9	Gauteng	18,178	1.5
South Africa		1,220,813	100.0

The Prince Edward Islands, which are considered part of the Western Cape for legal purposes but are administered by the national Department of Environmental Affairs, are not included in this table; they have surface areas of 290 km^{2} (Marion Island) and 45 km^{2} (Prince Edward Island).

== Historical data ==
The provincial borders have changed twice since 1994: once on 1 March 2006, when all provinces except the Free State and the Western Cape were affected; and once on 3 April 2009, when only the Gauteng–North West border was altered.

Province	1994–2006 (km^{2})	Percentage	2006–2009 (km^{2})	Percentage	2009–present (km^{2})	Percentage
Northern Cape	361,830	29.7	372,889	30.5	372,889	30.5
Eastern Cape	169,580	13.9	168,966	13.8	168,966	13.8
Free State	129,480	10.6	129,825	10.6	129,825	10.6
Western Cape	129,370	10.6	129,462	10.6	129,462	10.6
Limpopo	123,910	10.2	125,755	10.2	125,755	10.2
North West	116,320	9.5	106,512	8.7	104,882	8.6
KwaZulu-Natal	92,100	7.6	94,361	7.7	94,361	7.7
Mpumalanga	79,490	6.5	76,495	6.3	76,495	6.3
Gauteng	17,010	1.4	16,548	1.4	18,178	1.5
South Africa	1,219,090	100.0	1,220,813	100.0	1,220,813	100.0

The pre-2006 figures are based on a less accurate calculation, and therefore the total is different from that for the post-2006 figures.
