= Coronation Stakes (disambiguation) =

The Coronation Stakes is a horse race run at Ascot Racecourse.

Coronation Stakes may also refer to:

- Coronation Stakes (greyhounds), a greyhound racing competition between 1928 and 1994
- Coronation Stakes, a horse race now known as the Brigadier Gerard Stakes

Coronation Cup Stakes may also refer to:

- Coronation Cup Stakes, an American thoroughbred horse race
