= Coronation Park =

Coronation Park may refer to:

- Coronation Park (Toronto), a public park and memorial in Toronto, Ontario, Canada
- Coronation Park (Sunyani, Ghana), a multi-use stadium in Sunyani, Ghana
- Coronation Park, Delhi, India
- The home football stadium of Eastwood Town F.C., Nottinghamshire, England
- A public park in Woodcroft, Edmonton, Alberta, Canada
- A public park in Riverview, Ottawa, Canada
- A public park in Radcliffe, Greater Manchester, England
- A public park located in Palmerston North, New Zealand
- An area of Krugersdorp, South Africa

== See also ==
- Centenary and Coronation Park, in Thimphu, Bhutan
