= 2011 South African census =

3rd National Census
← 2001	9 October 2011	2022 →
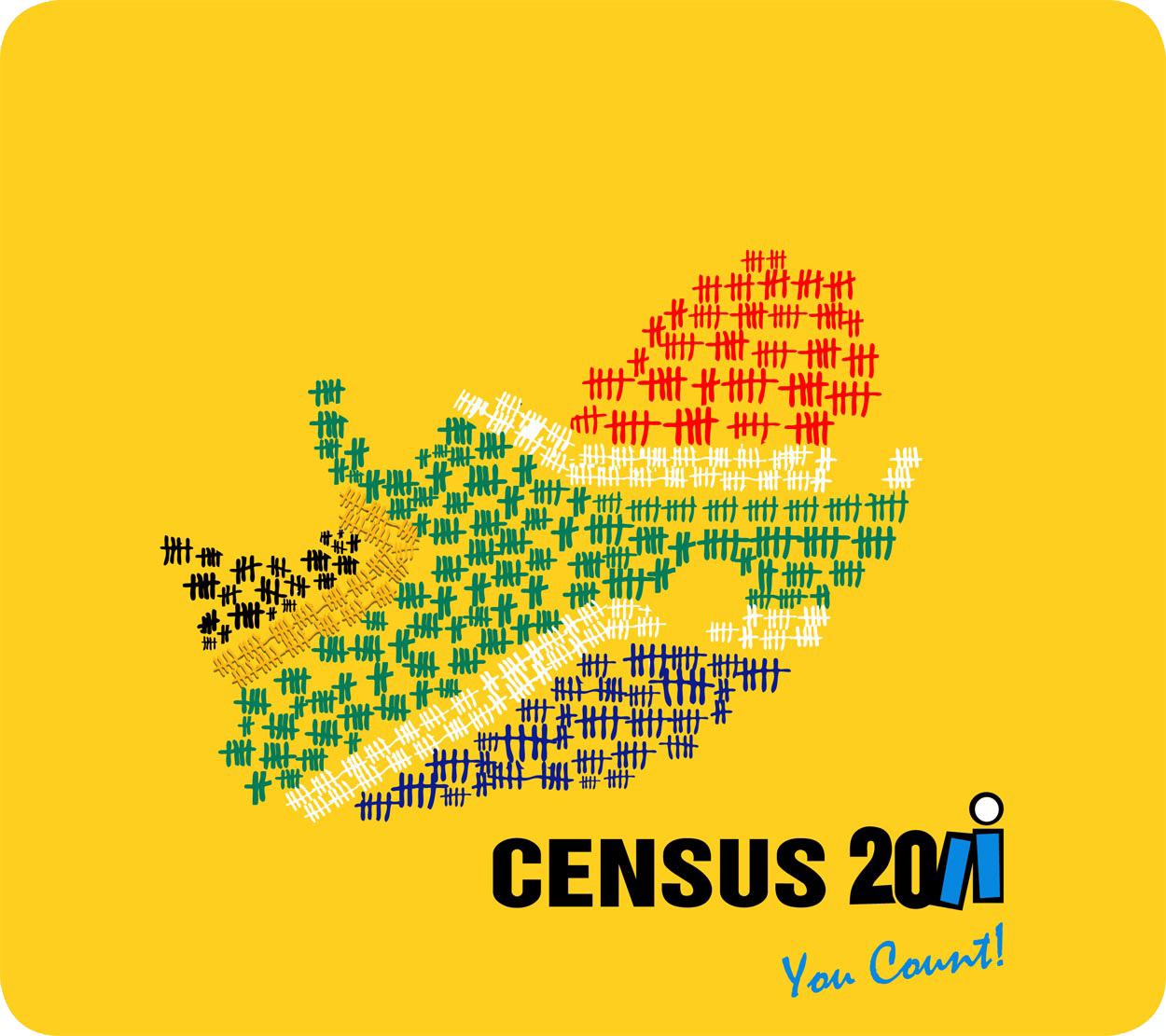

General information
- Country: South Africa

Results
- Total population: 51.8 million (14.39% ▲)
- Most populous region: Gauteng
- Least populous region: Northern Cape

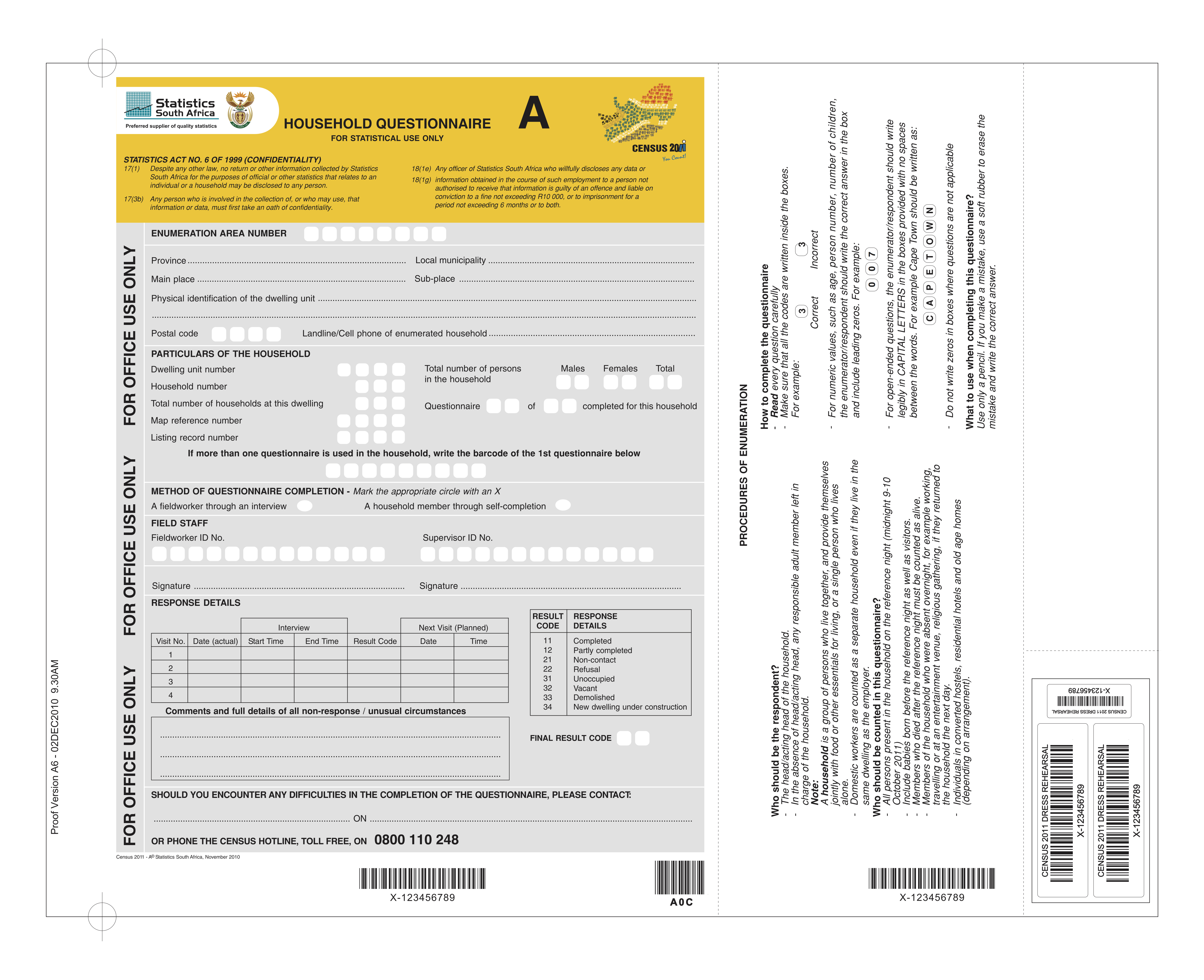
Questionnaire A

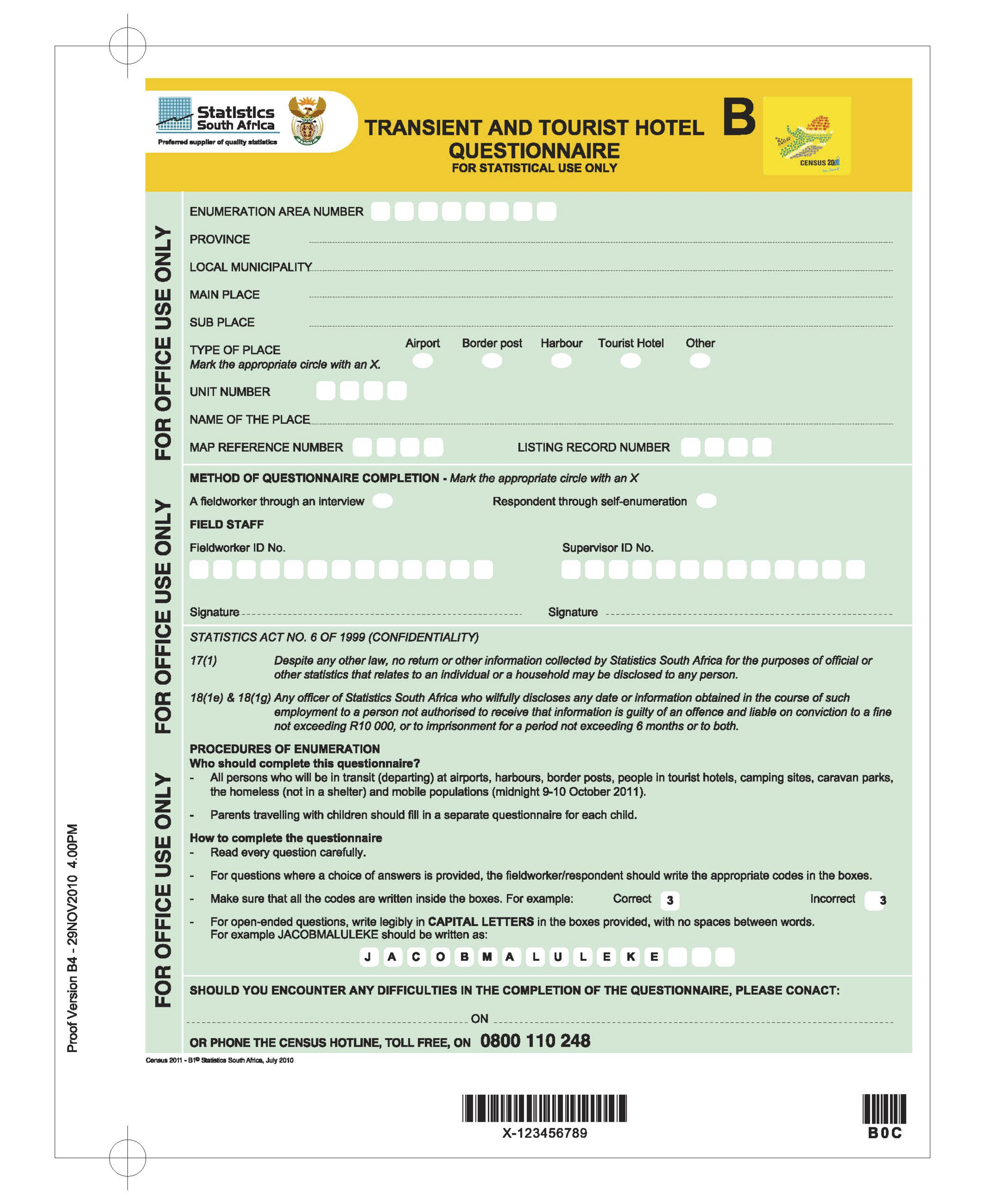
Questionnaire B

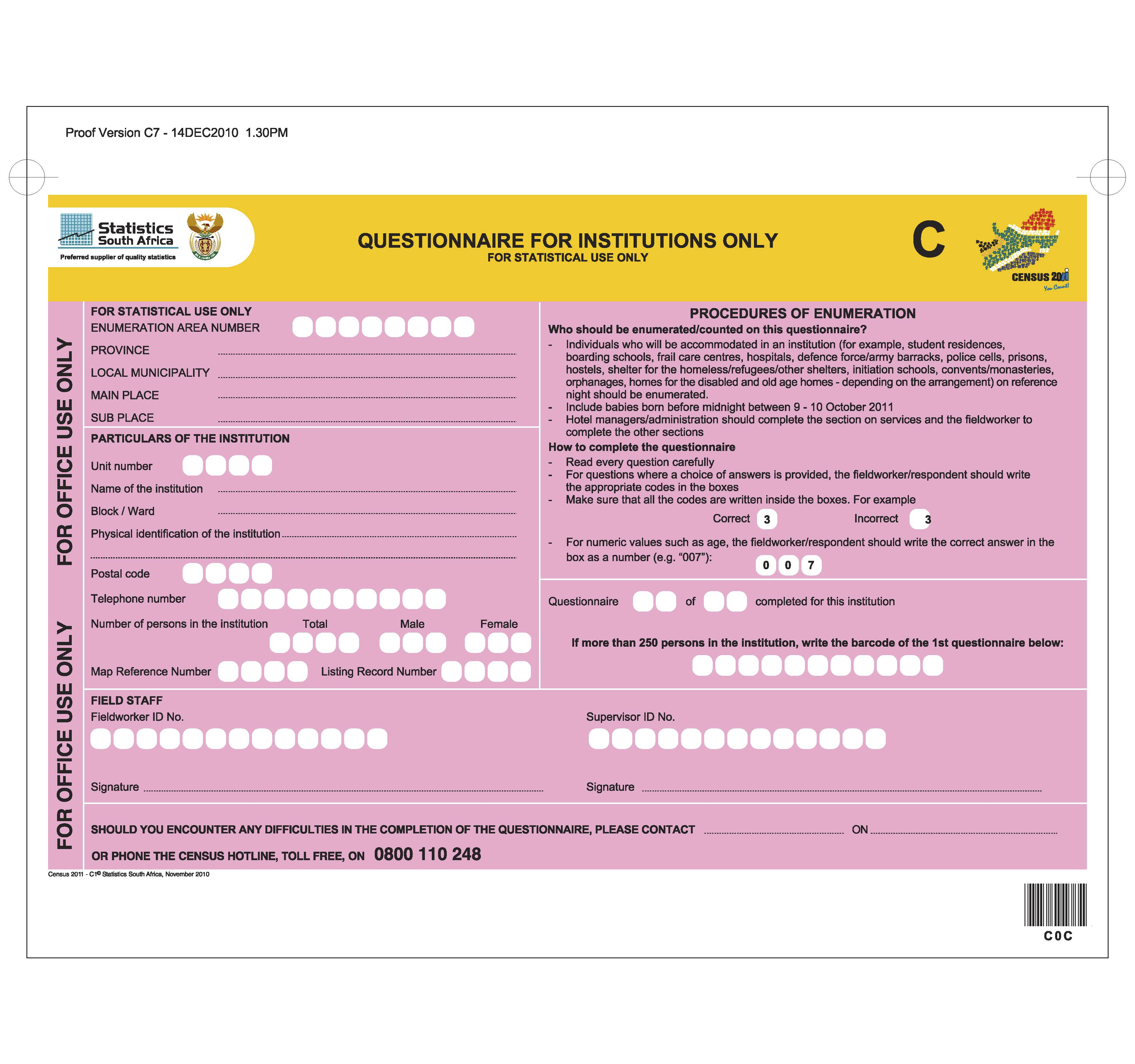
Questionnaire C

The South African National Census of 2011 is the 3rd comprehensive census performed by Statistics South Africa.

The 2011 census was the first census to include geo-referencing for every individual dwelling in South Africa.

== How the count was done ==
=== Planning ===
The development of an overall strategy began in April 2003 in the rainbow nation, initially for a planned national census in 2006 to meet the United Nations global directive for a census every five years. After an application to the government, it was postponed to 2011 to improve strategies to reduce undercounting in gated communities, farmlands and rural areas.

In February 2007 a large-scale Community Survey was conducted in all provinces. It was based on a random sample, enumerating 246,618 households. The main objective was to provide data of geography at district and municipal levels, build a logistics capacity for 2011 and primary data for population projections. The results were released in October 2007 with the caution that figures must be read with a "certain interval of confidence".

With lessons from the National Census in 2001 and Community Survey in 2007, a "team cells" approach was developed. This strategy was adopted mainly because of a skills-shortage, using experts from the United States, Kenya and United Kingdom to conduct on-the-job training for temporary Census staff. The programme was divided into a three-level hierarchy of sub-projects as follows:

1. Head office with the main function of providing support to the lower levels.
2. Provincial offices were responsible for coordination of all activities at their associated district and satellite offices.
3. District/Satellite offices implemented the fieldwork operations throughout the country.

During October 2010 a "dress rehearsal" was held, it tested all processed and refined the process to ensure a successful enumeration. There were a large number of non-response cases that were investigated by fieldworkers. This suggested that non-responses may be a "challenge" during the census night.

=== Pre-enumeration ===
The pre-enumeration phase involved over 7000 temporary staff, who concurrently demarcated enumeration areas, evaluated questionnaires and developed satellite office logistics.

The demarcation process involved dividing the country into "small pockets" of land, called enumeration areas based on administrative boundaries, size, and population density. The data used included satellite images, address data, gated community blueprints, sectional titles and sub-place spatial boundaries; sourced from private service providers and the geo-referencing Dwelling Frame Project. The objective of the project was to identity, locate and describe approximately 50% of dwelling structures in South Africa that have no address, predominantly in the former bantustans. It piloted in 2002 and was utilised for the first time in the 2011 National Census.

The geography division produced a list of 103,576 enumeration areas, a 25.68% increase of the 80,000 areas used in the 2001 Census. These areas were classified into ten types: Formal residential, Informal residential, Traditional residential, Farm, Parks and recreation, Collective living quarters, Industrial, Small holding, Vacant, and Commercial. The Verification Project only audited 28.96% of enumeration areas between November 2010 and July 2011. This resulted in some large areas to be verified during enumeration fieldwork, in some cases the area was split by identifiable features on the ground and earmarked for extra fieldworkers.

The development of the 2011 questionnaire focused on accuracy, relevance, interpretability, and coherence. There was a review of data points used in the 2001 Census and part of the review involved aligning the new questionnaire with best practises outlined by the United Nations Principles and Recommendations for Population and Housing Censuses. During 2009, a series of "behind-the-glass" test interviews were conducted with various Living Standard Measurement and language groups in South Africa. This research provided insight into the willingness of the respondent to answer "sensitive" questions, such as income, employment, mortality, fertility, disability and migration. The final questionnaires were printed predominantly in the English, Afrikaans and Isizulu, with translation guides for the remaining official languages, and split into three forms:

- Questionnaire A was designed for all people living in a households, including within institution grounds such as staff residences.
- Questionnaire B was for those in collective living quarters.
- Questionnaire C was for the population in transit (at ports of entry and exit) on Census night, including the homeless.

The recruitment process for permanent and temporary staff was held between early-2007 and May 2011, it involved Capacity Building Training Projects, targeted recruitment, employment agencies and a nationwide advertising campaign through multiple channels. A projected 181,426 staff members were required for the Census, the phase ended with 169,225 recruited out 350,000 potential candidates – leaving a 6.96% shortfall. The largest gaps were in the Fieldwork Coordinators, Fieldwork Supervisors and Fieldworkers positions, as the Census was designed to be community based and some areas were without potential Fieldworkers. The logistics of Fieldworker payment was managed by Recruitment, Appointment, Administration, Payment, Termination and Reconciliation (RAAPTR) committee, who aimed to deliver payment a week after completion of work.

=== Enumeration ===
Stats SA indicated that they would be recruiting 156,000 individuals for the Census 2011 operation including 120,000 fieldworkers, 30,000 supervisors and 6,000 census fieldwork coordinators.

Census night was the night between 9 and 10 October 2011. Approximately 20 million questionnaires were distributed during the 21-day enumeration phase from 10 to 31 October 2011 and a two-week "mop-up exercise" following up on households missed during the enumeration phase.

=== Data processing ===
"The processing of about 15 million questionnaires commenced in January 2012, immediately after bringing the sealed EA boxes from the various census offices to the processing centre in Pretoria during December 2011. Each box, and its contents, was assigned a store location position via a computerised store management system. Each time a box was required for any process it was called up and allocated through this system."

== Post-enumeration survey ==
"The PES collected data from all households in each of the selected EAs, based on particular questions in the census questionnaire. It also has specific additional questions focusing on where each person in the household was on census night. During data processing, these data from the PES are compared with the census data from the same households in a matching process, in order to determine how many people were missed in the census and how many were counted more than once. Reconciliation visits to the relevant households were undertaken when queries were raised that could not be resolved through matching of questionnaires."

== Controversy ==
=== Undercount ===
Stats SA announced that there was an undercount of 14.6% of the South African population with children under 5 years of age and white South Africans being amongst the most notable groups undercounted. The undercount means that an estimated 7.5 million South Africans were not counted in the census which in turn implies that South Africa actually had an estimate of a national population of 51.7 million in 2011.

=== Be counted or jailed ===
Section 16 of the Statistics Act of 1999 outlines the duties of every person in South Africa to participate in the collection of census data and section 18 of the same act provides for prosecution of any person refusing to provide information required for the census. For the 2011 census Statistics South Africa specifically applied for permission from the court to enforce section 16 and 18 of the act.

=== Crime-related incidents ===
Stats SA put various measures in place to help the public identify legitimate enumerators as a result of security concerns.

During the enumeration phase ending on 31 October 2011 crime-related incidents reported by census workers included 10 cases of assault, 15 cases of robbery and seven cases of intimidation. Eight staff members died in road accidents during this period.

=== Fieldworkers strike ===
On 31 October 2011 dissatisfied census workers in Gauteng protested over lower contractual fees than those advertised during the Census 2011 recruitment drive.

On 31 October 2011 Census enumerators in KwaZulu-Natal went on strike threatening to withhold completed questionnaires following an inaccurate report by a Durban newspaper that enumerators in other areas would be paid more than the R5,000 amount they had contractually agreed to. Statistician-General Pali Lehohla told reporters that all enumerators would receive a flat fee of R5,000 and that payment of census field workers was expected to cost a total of R700 million out of a total Census 2011 budget of R2.2 billion. Homes of striking census workers were raided by the police who confiscated thousands of completed census questionnaires.

Approximately 3,000 frustrated census workers had still not been paid by the end of November 2011 due to bank payment problems.

=== Unrealistic findings ===
The 2011 census data has been dismissed by many because of unrealistic findings.

== Key findings ==
The first reports of statistics, published on 30 October 2012, showed a total population of 51,770,560.

- Area: 1,220,813 square kilometres (471,359 sq mi)
- Population: 51,770,560
- Households: 14,450,161

=== Demographics ===
79.6% of the population is black. The median age of the total population is 25 years but the black population's median age is lower at 21 years.

Population pyramid, 2011

Population change in South Africa by group
Rank	Group	2001 Census	2011 Census	Change	Percent change
1	Black African	35,416,166	41,000,938	5,584,772 ▲	14.62% ▲
2 ▲	Coloured	3,994,505	4,615,401	620,896 ▲	14.42% ▲
3 ▼	White	4,293,640	4,586,838	293,198 ▲	6.60% ▲
4	Asian or Indian	1,115,467	1,286,930	171,463 ▲	14.27% ▲
5	Other	No Data	280,454	Steady	Steady
Total population		44,819,778	51,770,560	6,950,782 ▲	14.39% ▲

Population change in South Africa by language
Rank	First language	2001 Census	2011 Census	Change	Percent change
1	IsiZulu	10,677,305	11,587,374	910,069 ▲	8.18% ▲
2	IsiXhosa	7,907,153	8,154,258	247,105 ▲	3.08% ▲
3	Afrikaans	5,983,426	6,855,082	871,656 ▲	13.58% ▲
4 ▲	English	3,673,203	4,892,623	1,219,420 ▲	28.47% ▲
5 ▼	Sepedi	4,208,980	4,618,576	409,596 ▲	9.28% ▲
6 ▼	Setswana	3,677,016	4,067,248	390,232 ▲	10.08% ▲
7	Sesotho	3,555,186	3,849,563	294,377 ▲	7.95% ▲
8	Xitsonga	1,992,207	2,277,148	284,941 ▲	13.35% ▲
9	SiSwati	1,194,430	1,297,046	102,616 ▲	8.24% ▲
10	Tshivenda	1,021,757	1,209,388	187,631 ▲	16.82% ▲
11	IsiNdebele	711,821	1,090,223	378,402 ▲	42% ▲
12	Other	217,293	828,258	610,965 ▲	116.87% ▲
13	SA Sign Language	No Data	234,655	Steady	Steady

Population change in South Africa by gender
Rank	Gender	2001 Census	2011 Census	Change	Percent change
1	Female	23,385,737	26,581,769	3,196,032 ▲	12.79% ▲
2	Male	21,434,040	25,188,791	3,754,751 ▲	16.11% ▲

Population change in South Africa by province
Rank	Province	2001 Census	2011 Census	Change	Percent change
1 ▲	Gauteng	8,837,178	12,272,263	3,435,085 ▲	32.55% ▲
2 ▼	KwaZulu-Natal	9,426,017	10,267,300	841,283 ▲	8.54% ▲
3	Eastern Cape	6,436,763	6,562,053	125,290 ▲	1.93% ▲
4 ▲	Western Cape	4,524,335	5,822,734	1,298,399 ▲	25.10% ▲
5 ▼	Limpopo	5,273,642	5,404,868	131,226 ▲	2.46% ▲
6 ▲	Mpumalanga	3,122,990	4,039,939	916,949 ▲	25.60% ▲
7 ▼	North West	3,669,349	3,509,953	159,396 ▼	-4.44% ▼
8	Free State	2,706,775	2,745,590	38,815 ▲	1.42% ▲
9	Northern Cape	822,727	1,145,861	323,134 ▲	32.83% ▲
Total population		44,819,778	51,770,560	6,950,782 ▲	14.39% ▲

=== Education ===
Only 28.4% of South Africans over the age of twenty years have completed the 12th grade while only 33.8% even got to high school and 8.6% had no schooling at all. 12.1% have a tertiary qualification.

=== Household economic indicators ===
There are about 14.5 million households in South Africa, 77.6% live in formal dwellings, 7.9% in traditional and 13.6% live in informal dwellings.

Average household income is R103 204 per year with 13.18 million of the population employed.

A total of almost 1.3 million households have no access to piped water and as far as sanitation is concerned 8,242,924 have flush toilets, 297,847 households use bucket toilets and 748,597 households have no toilet at all.

Domestic appliance ownership is as follows; 11.1 million have an electric or gas stove, 9.9 million own a refrigerator. Washing machines are found in 4.6 million households and 2.5 million own a vacuum cleaner. Car ownership extends to 4.3 million households.

In terms of access to media and telecommunications 10.7 million own a television and 8.6 million have a DVD player while approximately 9.4 million have internet access, although not necessarily in the home. More than 12.8 million households have mobile phones.

=== Health and welfare ===
About one in nine South Africans are infected with HIV. 3.37 million children under the age of 17 had lost one or both parents and AIDS is blamed as a major factor.

=== Disability ===
"Because "disability" was redefined as having difficulties with a series of tasks such as seeing, hearing and walking, the census recorded higher figures than in previous years, most likely as a result of people with such difficulties choosing not to be defined as disabled."

The new method is based on the Washington Group on Disability Statistics which replaced the previously used 1980 version of the World Health Organization's International Classification of Impairments, Disabilities and Handicaps.

The two most used "assistive devices" are spectacles at 14% of the population and chronic medication is used by 12.3%. Walking sticks or frames, hearing aids and wheelchairs are used by 2.3% to 3.2% of South Africans.

== See also ==
- South African National Census of 2001
- South African National Census of 2022
- Demographics of South Africa
