= Mpumalanga =

Coordinates: 26°S 30°E

Mpumalanga iMpumalanga (Swazi) iPumalanga (Southern Ndebele)
- Province
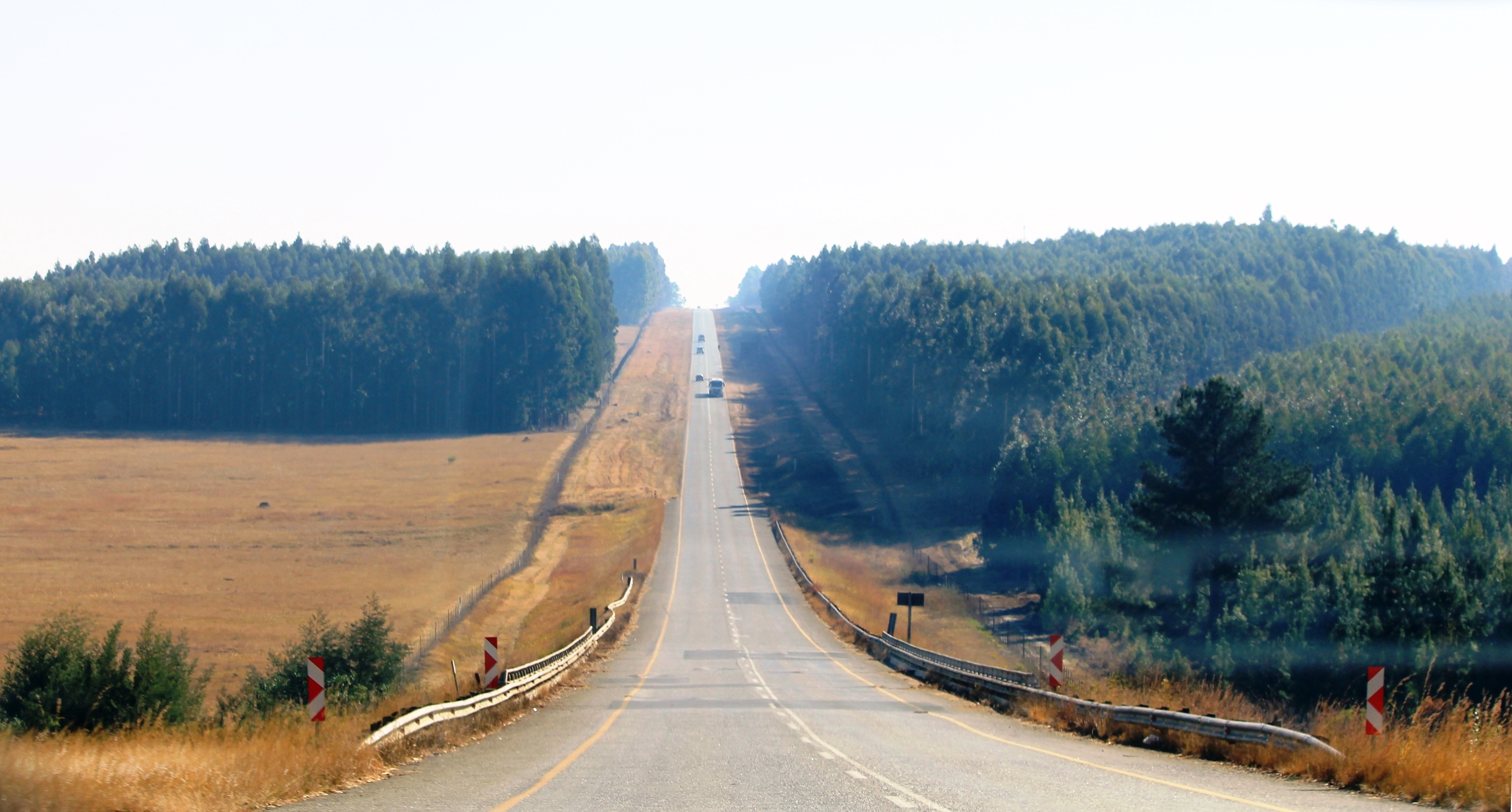
- The R33 road crossing the Assegaai River, south of Piet Retief

- Flag Coat of arms
- Motto: Omnia labor vincit (Labour will conquer all)
- Location of Mpumalanga in South Africa
- Country: South Africa
- Established: 27 April 1994
- Capital: Mbombela
- Districts: List: Gert Sibande; Nkangala; Ehlanzeni

Government
  - Type: Parliamentary system
  - Premier: Mandla Ndlovu (ANC)
  - Legislature: Mpumalanga Provincial Legislature

Area
  - Total: 76,495 km^{2} (29,535 sq mi)
  - Rank: 8th in South Africa
- Highest elevation: 2,331 m (7,648 ft)

Population (2022)
  - Total: 5,142,216
  - Rank: 6th in South Africa
  - Density: 67.223/km^{2} (174.11/sq mi)
  - Rank: 3rd in South Africa

Population groups (2022)
  - Black: 95.3%
  - White: 3.6%
  - Coloured: 0.6%
  - Indian or Asian: 0.5%
  - Other: 0.5%

Languages (2022)
  - Swazi: 30.5%
  - Zulu: 27.8%
  - Tsonga: 10.6%
  - Pedi: 10.3%
  - Southern Ndebele: 9.9%
  - Afrikaans: 3.2%
  - Southern Sotho: 2.3%
  - English: 1.5%
- Time zone: UTC+2 (SAST)
- ISO 3166 code: ZA-MP
- HDI (2019): 0.675 medium · 7th of 9
- GDP: US$58.2 billion
- Website: www.mpg.gov.za

Mpumalanga
- Zulu: iMpumalanga
- Xhosa: iMpumalanga
- Afrikaans: Mpumalanga
- Sepedi: Bohlabaletšatši
- Swazi: iMpumalanga
- Sesotho: Bochabaletsatsi
- Setswana: Botlhabatsatsi
- Xitsonga: Vuhuma-dyambu
- Venda: Vhubvaḓuvha
- Southern Ndebele: iPumalanga
- Khoekhoe: Sorebnaǂoaxaǀxāb

Mpumalanga (/əmˌpuːməˈlɑːŋɡə/; Portuguese: Mepumalanga) is one of the nine provinces of South Africa. The name means "East", or literally "The Place Where the Sun Rises" in the Nguni languages. Mpumalanga lies in eastern South Africa, bordering Eswatini and Mozambique and accounts for 6.3% of South Africa's total land area. It shares borders with the South African provinces of Limpopo to the north, Gauteng to the west, the Free State to the southwest, and KwaZulu-Natal to the south. The capital is Mbombela.

Mpumalanga was formed in 1994 at the end of apartheid, when the area that was the Eastern Transvaal was merged with the former bantustans KaNgwane, KwaNdebele and parts of Lebowa and Gazankulu. Much of the history and current significance of the region are as an area of trade.

== History ==
=== Precolonial era ===
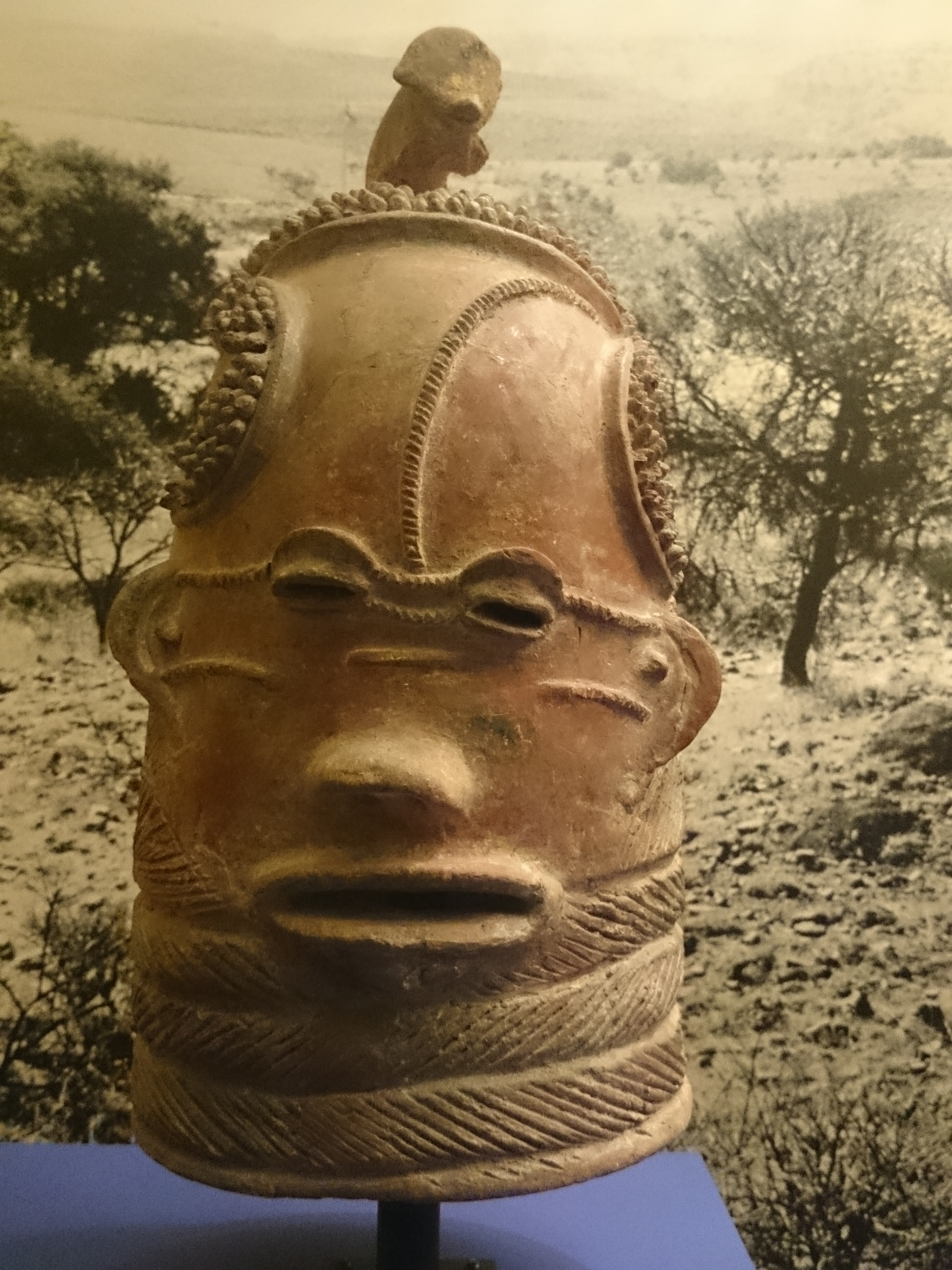
One of the Lydenburg Heads from around A.D. 500 found in Mpumalanga

Archeological sites in the Mpumalanga region indicate settlement by humans and their ancestors dating back 1.7 million years. Rock paintings, engravings and other archeological evidence throughout the province indicate that Mpumalanga has a long history of human habitation by groups of hunter gatherers. Excavations not far from the Mpumalanga border in the Origstad district, show evidence of Middle Stone Age habitation dating back to 40,000 years ago. The Lion Cavern, in Ngwenya on the Eswatini border, shows evidence of people mining iron ore in the Mpumalanga region and surrounding areas from at least 28,000 years ago.

Evidence from mine shafts and trade goods shows that there was notable industry in tin, copper, gold, iron, ochre, and bronze. The Lydenburg Heads, from around 500 CE, are Africa's oldest Iron Age artworks south of the equator and were found in Mpumalanga. Evidence from a site near Mbombela shows evidence of agricultural societies from between the 6th to 17th century.

Mbayi stone-walled sites on the Mpumalanga highveld are indicative of a large precolonial agropastoral society between ~1500 and 1820 CE. These societies became centers of trade, with increasingly large and centralised populations This pattern increased as they connected to the Portuguese trading post in Maputo Bay.

In this era, groups that would become the Swazi, Pedi, Ndebele, Tsonga people, Mapulana and others established themselves in the area that is now Mpumalanga.

=== Colonial era ===
In 1845, as part of the Great Trek, the first Dutch-speaking colonial settlers arrived in what they called the eastern Transvaal. The rest of the 19th century in the region was characterised by colonial encroachment and conflict over land and political control. In 1852, the Boers established the South African Republic. The well established Pedi, Swazi and Zulu kingdoms put up significant resistance against the settlers. The Pedi fought wars with the Boers in 1876 (see Sekhukhune Wars) and the Zulu fought with British settlers in 1879 (see Anglo-Zulu War). These interconnected conflicts played a role in shifting the balance of power in southern Africa to colonial control. After 1860, missionaries, especially German missionaries, like Alexander Merensky, set up mission stations in the region, spreading Christianity and European values.

Just as the region had been a center for trade in the precolonial era, in the colonial era, the Eastern Transvaal region became an important thoroughfare for trade between Johannesburg and Delagoa Bay (now Maputo). Gold mining around areas like Pilgrims Rest and Barberton and farming were the main forms of economic activity. On farms in the Transvaal, under a system known as Inboekstelsel, Boers carried out raids to capture children and forced them into indentured labour. During the South African War, the region was the site of notable battles.

=== Apartheid ===
When the National Party came to power in 1948, their policy of apartheid intensified the segregation that had defined communities in the Transvaal. Under a policy of forced removals, Black South Africans were evicted from areas reserved for white people and moved into homelands, including KaNgwane, KwaNdebele, Lebowa and Gazankulu. As the apartheid regime implemented oppressive policies that defined almost every aspect of life, activists responded with resistance.

In 1959, the small town of Bethal on what is now the Mpumalanga highveld was the center of the anti-apartheid consumer potato boycott in response to the working conditions Black South African labourers faced on farms in the area. The region was influenced by dynamics in exile and elsewhere in the country, for instance Black Consciousness, the Sharpeville Massacre and the 1976 Soweto Uprisings. In the 1980s, under intense repression, youth and labour organizations moblized against the government and townships and Bantustans erupted in political unrest and violence.

In 1986, an avoidable disaster killed 177 mine workers in Kinross Mine in the region's highveld. The response to the disaster by the National Union of Mineworkers was a key point in the South African labour struggle. By the late 1980s, the intensity of resistance across South Africa (including areas like Mpumalanga, which hadn't previously been seen as key areas of resistance) combined with economic factors and international pressure was strong enough to end apartheid. On 27 April 1994, when South Africa held its first democratic elections, Mpumalanga province was formed. It was originally called the "Eastern Transvaal" province, but the name was later changed to Mpumalanga on 24 August 1995.

=== Post-apartheid ===
The liberation movement turned leading party, the African National Congress (ANC) came into power in Mpumalanga after white minority rule ended. A program of land redistribution, aimed at granting land back to the black communities who were forcibly moved during apartheid, had redistributed tens of thousands of hectares to these communities and their descendants. However, the process has been marked by corruption, controversy and has been seen as inadequate to address the extent of apartheid spatial planning.

In 2001, 1,270 hectares of the Boomplaats farm near Mashishing was the first farm in South Africa to be expropriated.

== Geography ==
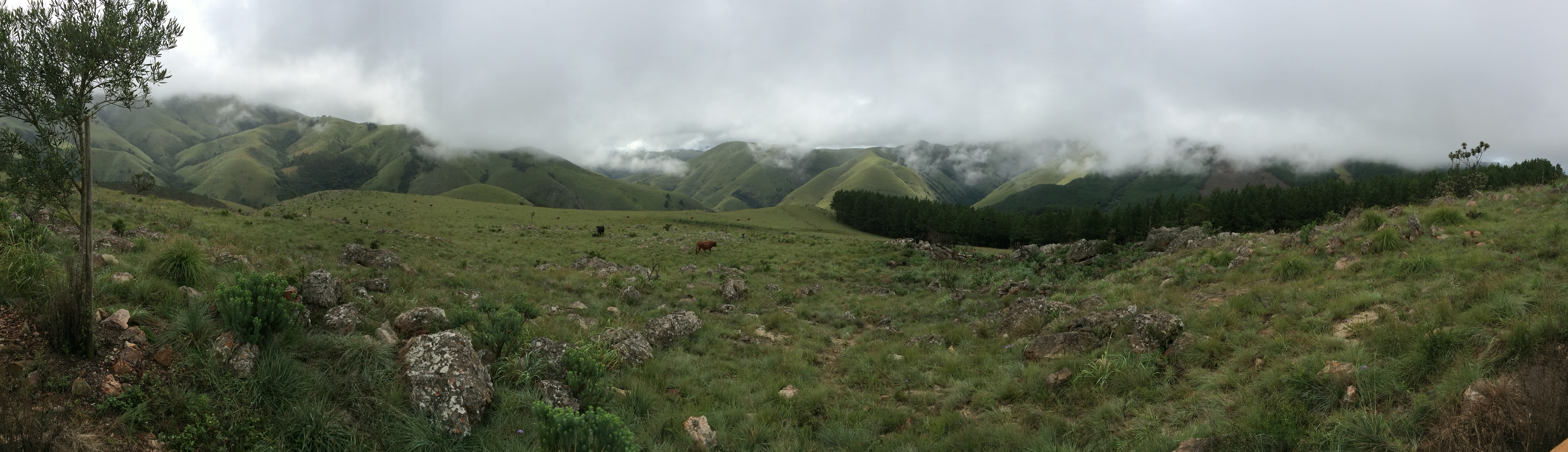
A view from the mountains of the Barberton Geotrail, where evidence of the earliest signs of life (3.2 billion-years-old) was found.

The Drakensberg escarpment divides Mpumalanga into a westerly half consisting mainly of high-altitude grassland called the Highveld and an eastern half situated in low-altitude subtropical Lowveld/Bushveld, mostly savanna habitat. The southern half of the Kruger National Park is in the latter region. The Drakensberg exceeds heights of 2000 m in most places, with this central region of Mpumalanga being very mountainous. These regions have alpine grasslands and small pockets of Afromontane forest. The Lowveld is relatively flat with interspersed rocky outcrops. The Lebombo Mountains form a low range in the far east, on the border with Mozambique.

Some of the oldest rocks on Earth have been found in the Barberton area; these ancient greenstones and metamorphosed granites form the Crocodile River Mountains in the southeast of the province. The Lowveld is underlaid by African Cratonic Basement rocks of ages in excess of 2 billion years. The Highveld is mostly Karoo Sequence sedimentary rock of a younger, Carboniferous to Permian age.

Mpumalanga is the only South African province to border two provinces of Mozambique (Gaza Province to the northeast and Maputo Province to the east), as well as all four regions of Eswatini (Lubombo, Hhohho, Manzini, and Shiselweni districts).

=== Climate ===
The Lowveld is subtropical, due to its latitude and proximity to the warm Indian Ocean. The Highveld is comparatively much cooler and drier, due to its elevation of 1700 m to 2300 m above sea level. The Drakensberg escarpment receives the most precipitation, with all other areas being moderately well-watered by mostly-summer thunderstorms. The Highveld often experiences considerable freezing, while the Lowveld is mostly frost-free. Winter rainfall is rare, except for some drizzle on the escarpment. The differences in climate are demonstrated by comparing the capital, Mbombela, which is in the Lowveld, with Belfast, which is an hour away on the Highveld:

- Mbombela averages: January maximum: 29 °C (min: 19 °C), July maximum: 23 °C (min: 6 °C), annual precipitation: 767 mm
- Belfast averages: January maximum: 23 °C (min: 12 °C), June maximum: 15 °C (min: 1 °C), annual precipitation: 878 mm

With climate change in the province, rainfall is becoming more variable, temperatures and evaporation rates are rising and extreme weather events are becoming more frequent. It is predicted that these changes will shift biomes so that most of the province will be savanna.

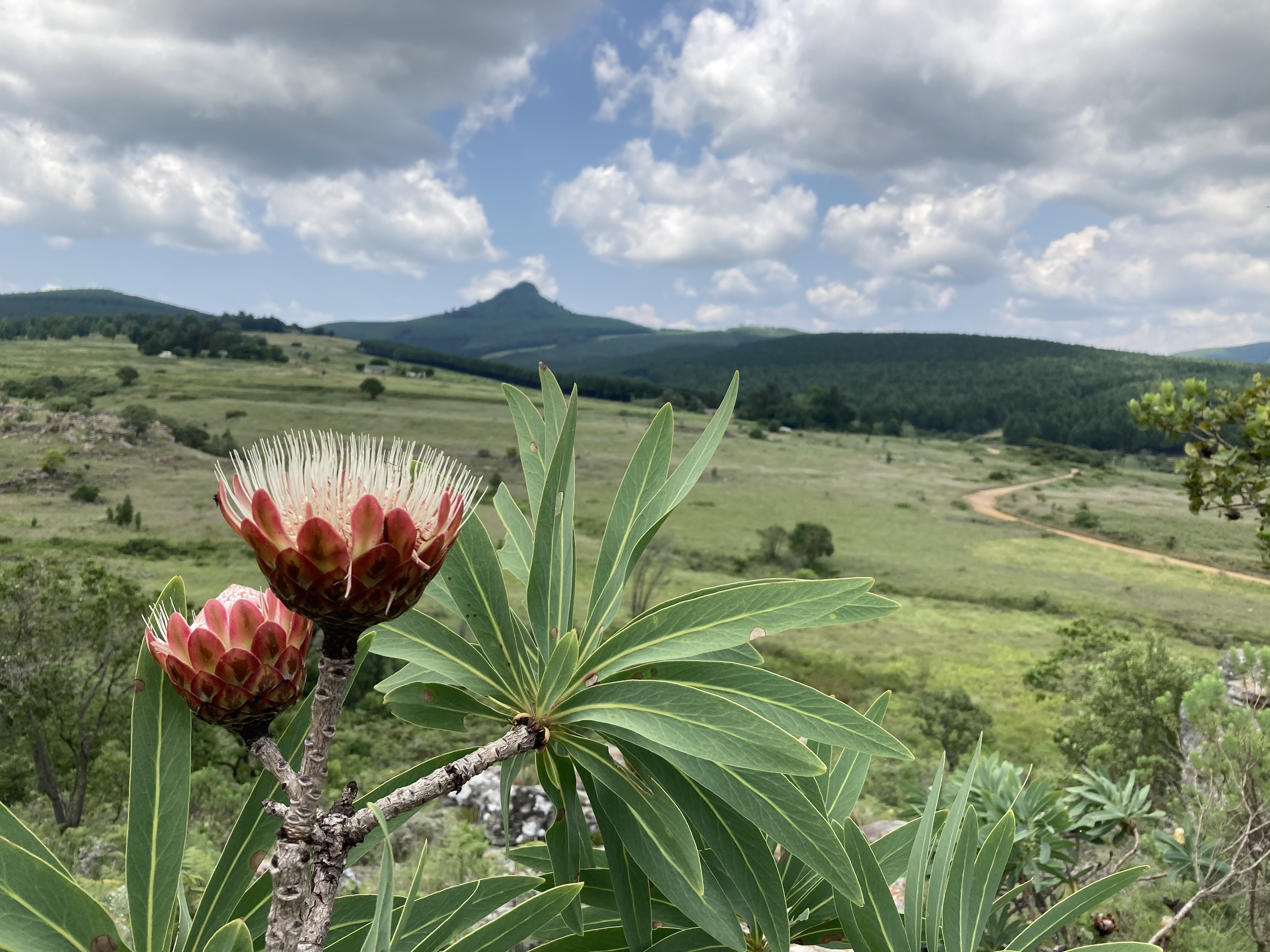
Proteas near Sabie

== Ecology ==
Some of the earliest signs of life on Earth have been found in Mpumalanga. In the Makhonjwa mountain range's greenstone belt near Barberton, a fossil layer shows microbial activity that is 3.22 billion years old. This discovery indicates that life emerged on Earth 300 million years earlier than previously thought.

Mpumalanga has a high plant and animal diversity. Many species are endemic to the province.

=== Endemic species ===
A partial list of species that are endemic to Mpumalanga

- Robust Golden Mole (Amblysomus robustus), a mammal in the golden mole family.
- Treur River Barb (Enteromius treurensis), a river fish.
- Barberton sugarbush (Protea curvata), a protea plant threatened by mining activity.
- Sim's Spotted Aloe (Aloe simii) an aloe threatened by road construction.
- Komati Waterberry (Syzygium komatiense) a species of waterberry tree.
- Thorncroftia lotterii, a flowering plant.
- Acontias albigularis, a lizard species.
- Procrica mariepskopa, a moth species.
- Inkomati Mountain Catfish (Amphilius engelbrechti)
- Yellow Baberton Grass Aloe (Aloe craibii)
- Longtom oneye (Monopsis kowynensis)
- Graskop cliff aloe (Aloe nubigena)

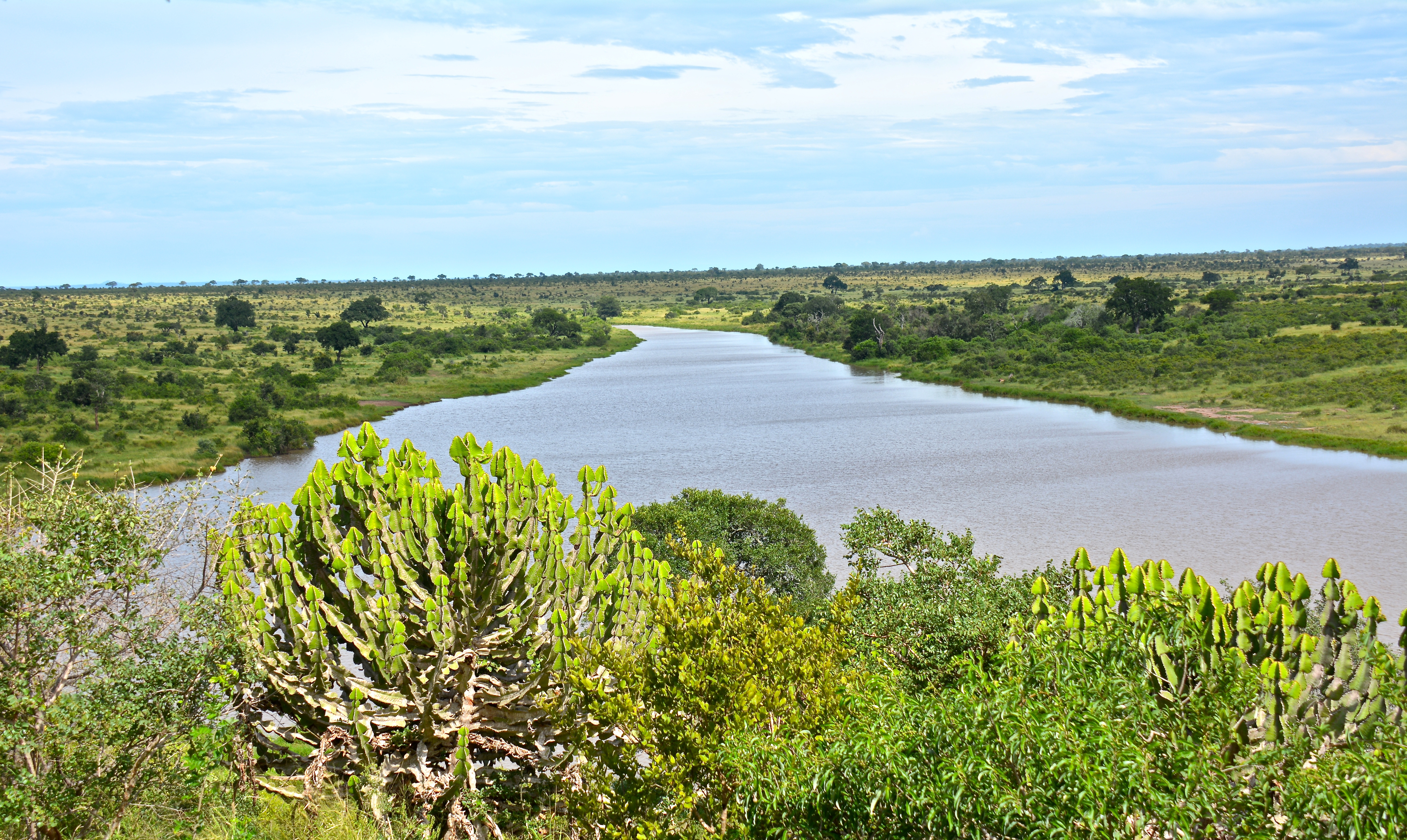
Kruger National Park, South Africa's largest conservation area

=== Conservation areas ===
The diverse and special flora and fauna of the province enjoys protection in a range of nature reserves.

- Barberton Nature Reserve
- Blyde River Canyon Nature Reserve
- Great Limpopo Transfrontier Park, previously known as Gaza-Kruger-Gonarezhou Transfrontier Park. This international game park brings together some of the best and most established wildlife areas in southern Africa. The park is managed as an integrated unit across an unprecedented three international boundaries which includes the Kruger National Park (South Africa), Limpopo National Park (Mozambique) and Gonarezhou National Park (Zimbabwe).
- Lowveld National Botanical Garden in Mbombela
- Sabi Sand Game Reserve, which is built up of numerous private reserves: Nottens Bush Camp, Idube Safari Lodge, Chitwa Chitwa Game Lodge, Djuma Game Reserve, Exeter Game Lodge, Inyati Private Game Reserve, Leopard Hills Private Game Reserve, Lion Sands Private Game Reserve, Londolozi Game Reserve, Mala Mala Game Reserve, Savanna Private Game Reserve and Ulusaba Game Lodge.
- Verloren Vallei near Dullstroom

Many species of plants are unique to the different geological formations within Mpumalanga. Some examples of these formations include serpentines of Barberton Mountains, norites of Sekhukhuneland, quartzites of Blyde River Canyon, and the dolomites in the northern plateaus.

== Law and government ==
Mpumalanga is governed by the Mpumalanga Provincial Legislature, a unicameral system of 30 legislators democratically elected though a closed list system. Under the constitution of South Africa, the legislature is intended to create laws, promote public participation and provide oversight. From 1994 to the present, the African National Congress has been the leading party in the Mpumalanga legislature. As of the 2019 elections, the Economic Freedom Fighters, Democratic Alliance and Freedom Front Plus are in opposition in the legislature. Elected every five years, the premier of Mpumalanga is the head of government. The Executive Council of Mpumalanga is appointed by the premier from among the members of the provincial legislature. Since 2024 Mandla Ndlovu has held the office of premier.

== Municipalities ==
Mpumalanga districts and local municipalities

Mpumalanga Province is divided into three district municipalities. The district municipalities are in turn divided into 18 local municipalities:

=== District municipalities ===
- Ehlanzeni District
  - Bushbruckridge
  - Mbombela
  - Nkomazi
  - Thaba Chweu
  - Umjindi
- Gert Sibande District
  - Albert Luthuli
  - Dipaleseng
  - Govan Mbeki
  - Lekwa
  - Mkhondo
  - Msukaligwa
  - Pixley ka Seme
- Nkangala District
  - Delmas
  - Dr JS Moroka
  - Emalahleni
  - Highlands
  - Steve Tshwete
  - Thembisile

== Economy ==
=== Farming ===
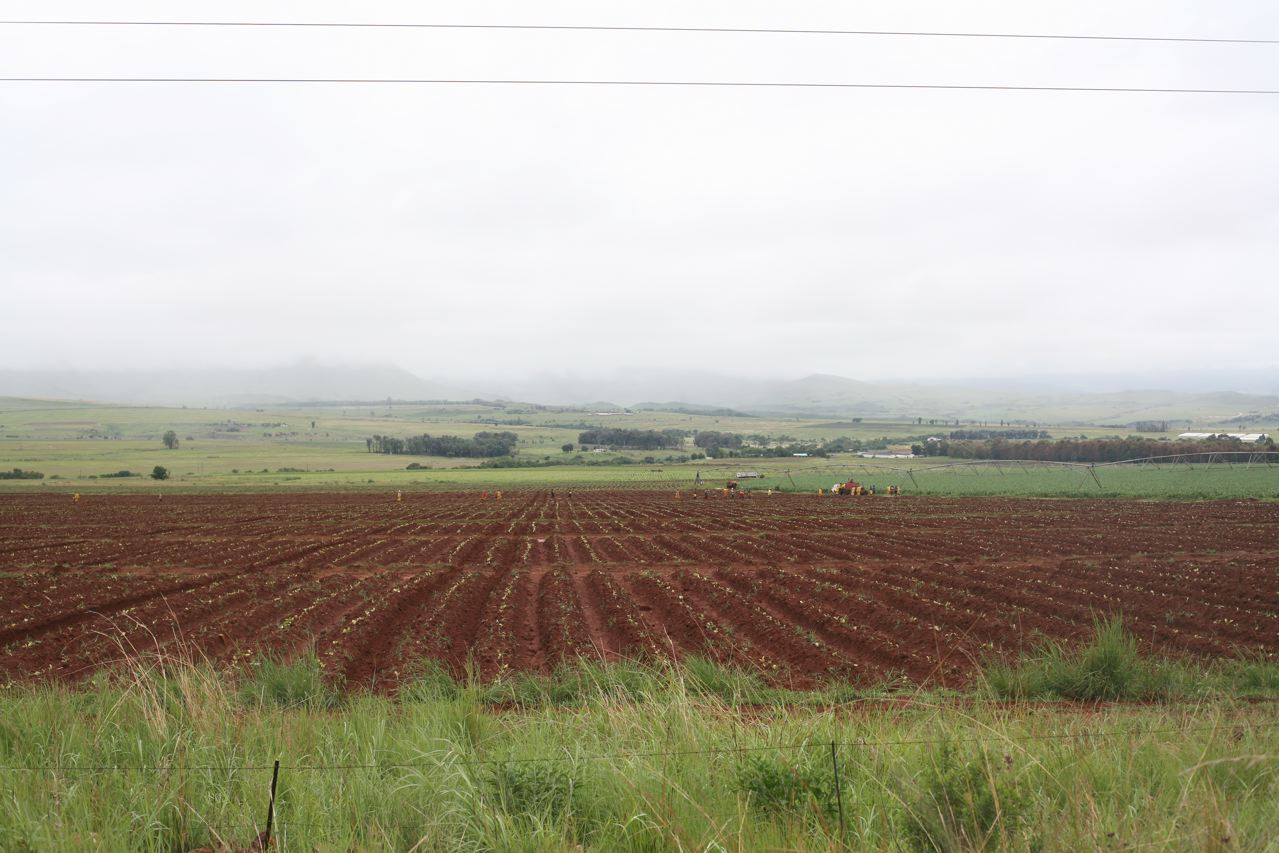
Farm in Mpumalanga highveld

68% of land area in the province is used by agriculture. The climatic contrasts between the drier Highveld region, with its cold winters, and the hot, humid Lowveld allow for a variety of agricultural activities. Mpumalanga has been an important supplier of fruit and vegetables for local and international markets for decades. A history of dispossession mean that farming land is largely white owned, although policies of land redistribution era aim to address this.

Crops include maize, wheat, sorghum, barley, sunflower seed, soybeans, macadamias, groundnuts, sugar cane, vegetables, coffee, tea, cotton, tobacco, citrus, subtropical and deciduous fruit. Natural grazing covers approximately 14% of Mpumalanga. The main products are beef, mutton, wool, poultry and dairy.

Farming in the province is driven by both a combination of seasonal, permanent and temporary labourers. Conditions on farms vary widely but seasonal and temporary workers, many of whom are migrant workers from nearby Mozambique, face intense insecurity.

Forestry is extensive around Sabie and Graskop. Located near the forests, Ngodwana is the site of one of South Africa's largest paper mills (Sappi).

=== Mining ===
Extensive mining is done and the minerals found include gold, platinum group metals, silica, chromite, vanadiferous magnetite, argentiferous zinc, antimony, cobalt, copper, iron, manganese, tin, coal, andalusite, chrysotile asbestos, kieselguhr, limestone, magnesite, talc and shale.

Gold was first discovered in Mpumalanga province in 1883 by Auguste Roberts in the mountains surrounding what is now Barberton. Gold is still mined in the Barberton area today.

Mpumalanga accounts for 83% of South Africa's coal production. 90% of South Africa's coal consumption is used for electricity generation and the synthetic fuel industry. Coal power stations are in proximity to the coal deposits. A coal liquefaction plant in Secunda (Secunda CTL) is one of the country's two petroleum-from-coal extraction plants, which is operated by the synthetic fuel company Sasol.

The high density of coal power stations on the Mpumalanga highveld means that the region has the highest levels of nitrogen dioxide pollution in the world.

=== Attractions ===
Mpumalanga is popular with tourists. Kruger National Park, established in 1898 for the protection of Lowveld wildlife, covering 20,000 square kilometres (7,700 sq mi), is a popular destination. The other major tourist attractions include the Sudwala Caves and the Blyde River Canyon.

Many activities including the big jump, mountain and quad biking, horse trails, river rafting and big game viewing are endemic to the region. This is "Big Five" territory. Towns in the Lowveld are Barberton, Mbombela, White River, Sabie, Graskop, Hazyview, Malelane, Pilgrim's Rest, Lydenburg and Nkomazi.

In 2008, an haute cuisine route was formed, trickling from Mbombela down to Hazyview. The Lowveld gourmet route covers the four top fine dining restaurants the area has to offer.

== Culture ==
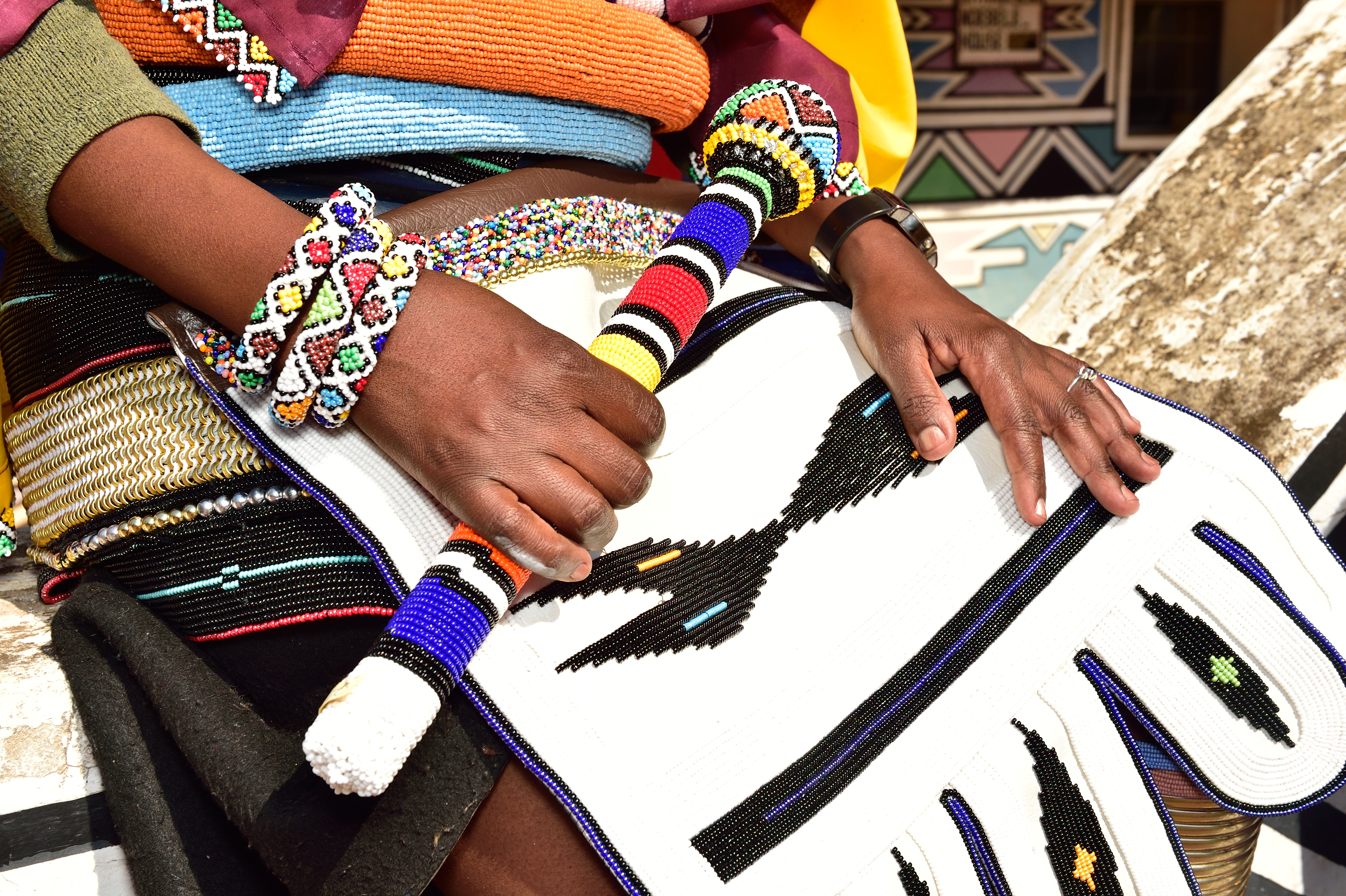
Ndebele traditional dress

Mpumalanga is home to a diverse range of cultures, including Swazi, Ndebele, Afrikaans, Tsonga, Zulu, Mapulana, Portuguese and Pedi communities.

The Ndebele Cultural Village at Botshabelo is a renowned center of cultural heritage, with displays of Ndebele house painting. Ndebele artist Esther Mahalangu gained international acclaim for her artwork rooted in Ndebele traditions and geometric patterns. Prominent South African artist Gerard Sekoto was born in Botshabelo.

Many celebrated South African musicians, such as Ray Phiri, Rebecca Malope, Oncemore Six, and Pretty Yende, are from Mpumalanga.

Since 2003, Mpumalanga's capital city, Mbombela, has hosted the Afrikaans national arts festival Innibos. The festival features music, comedy, arts, crafts and theatre.

== Gallery ==
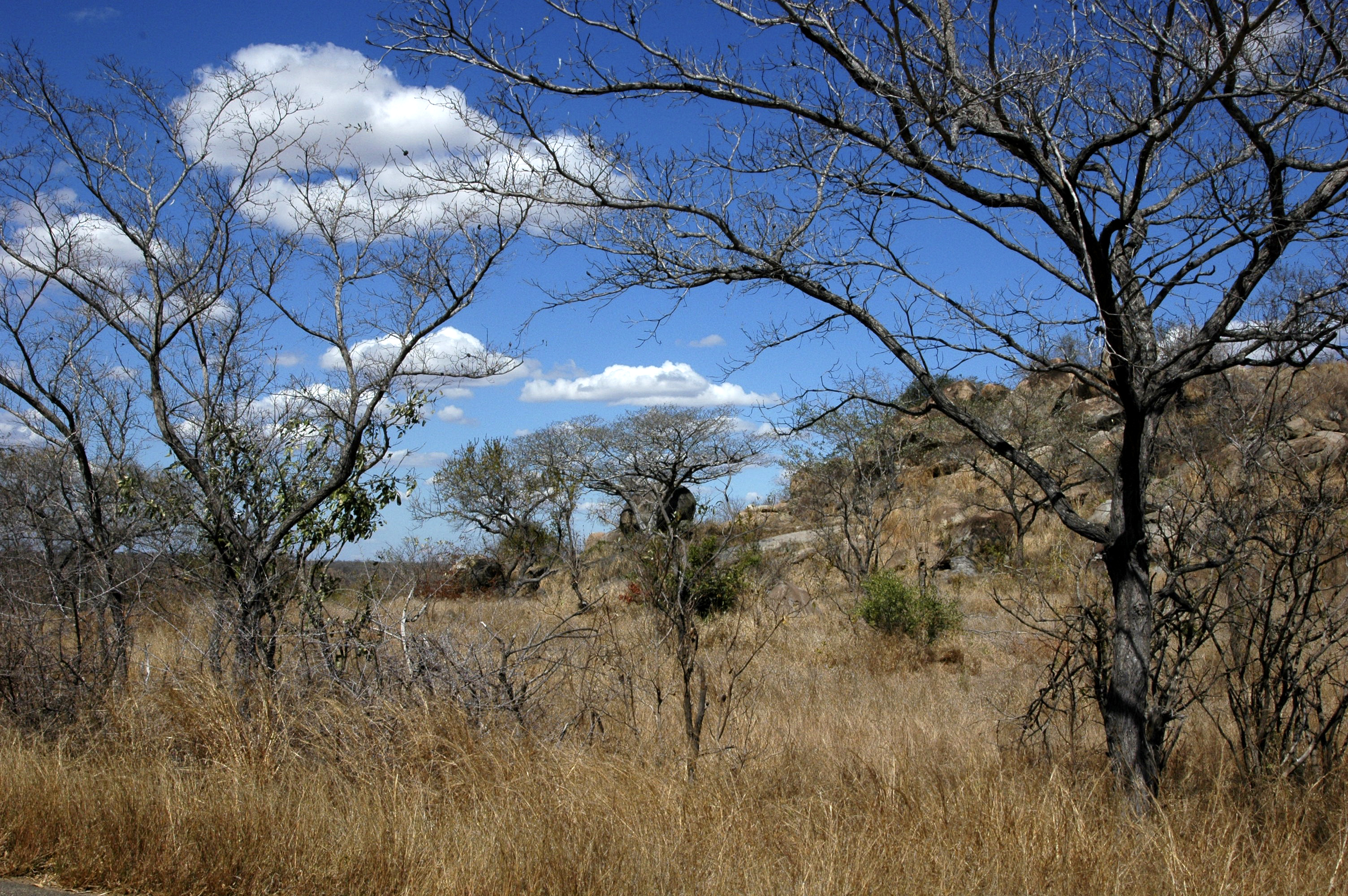
Kruger National Park.

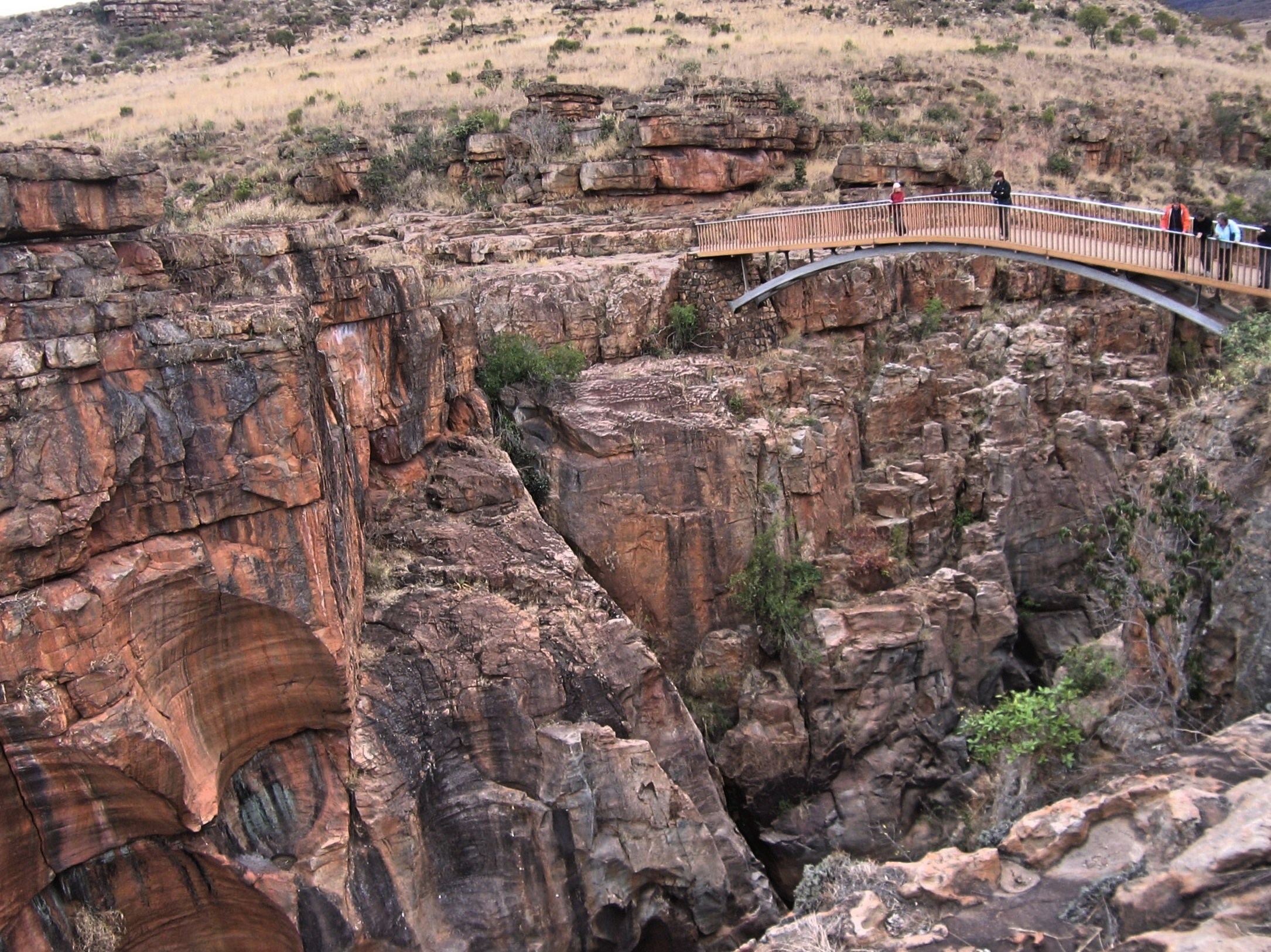
Bourke's Luck Potholes.

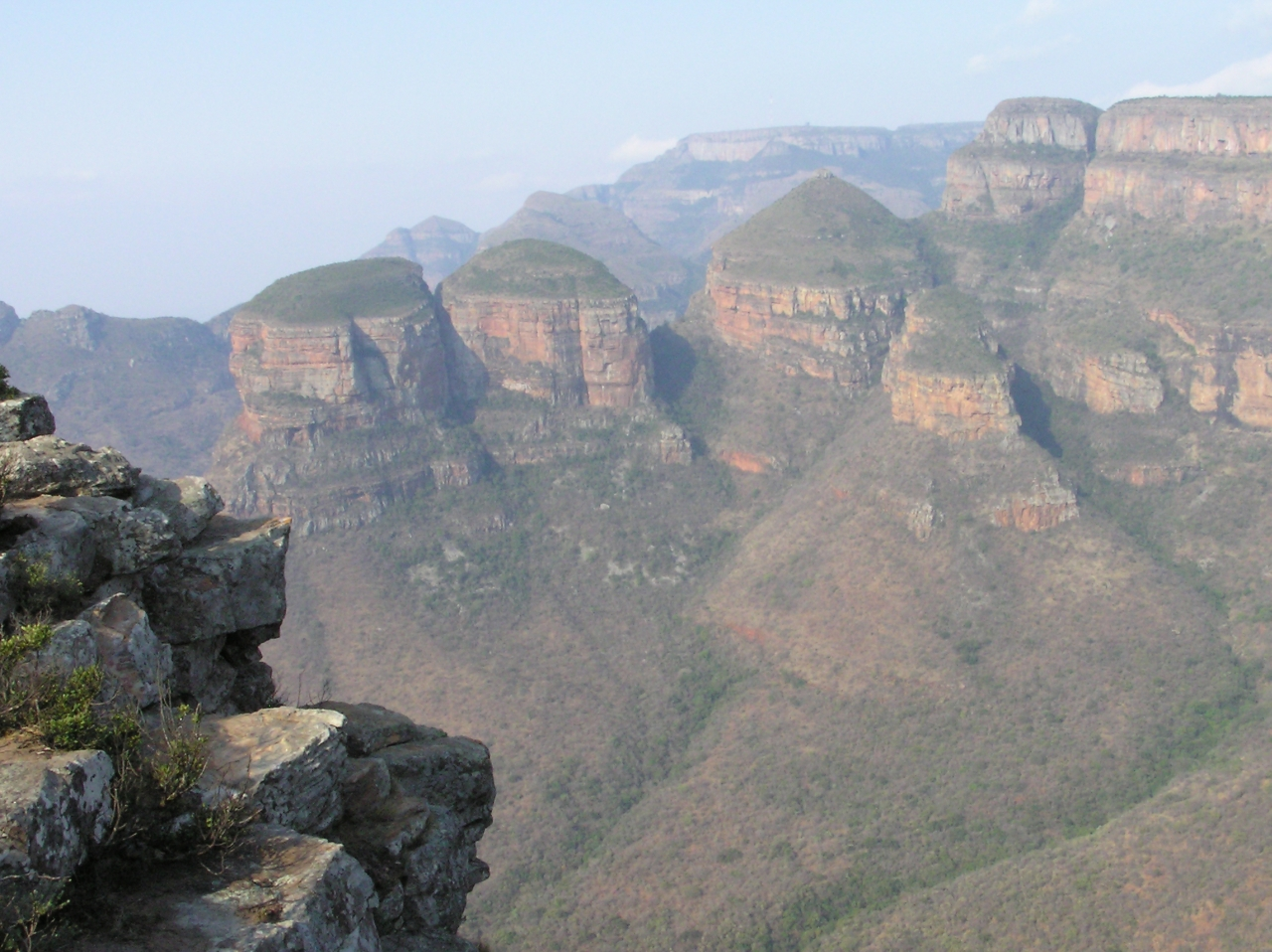
Three Rondavels of the Blyde River Canyon.

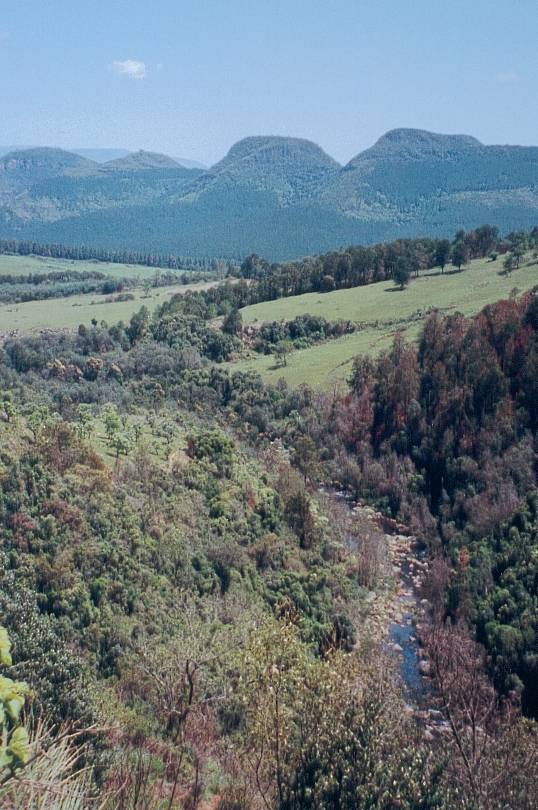
Escarpment.

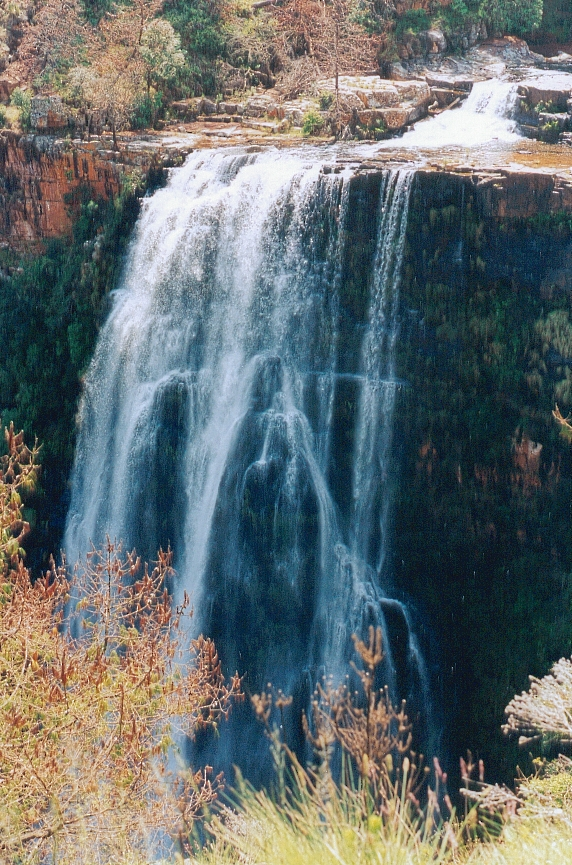
Lisbon Falls.

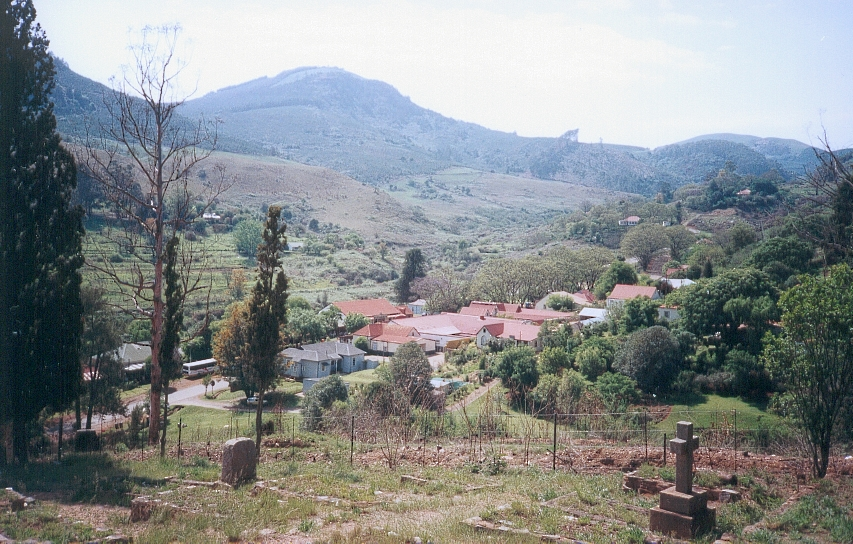
Pilgrim's Rest.

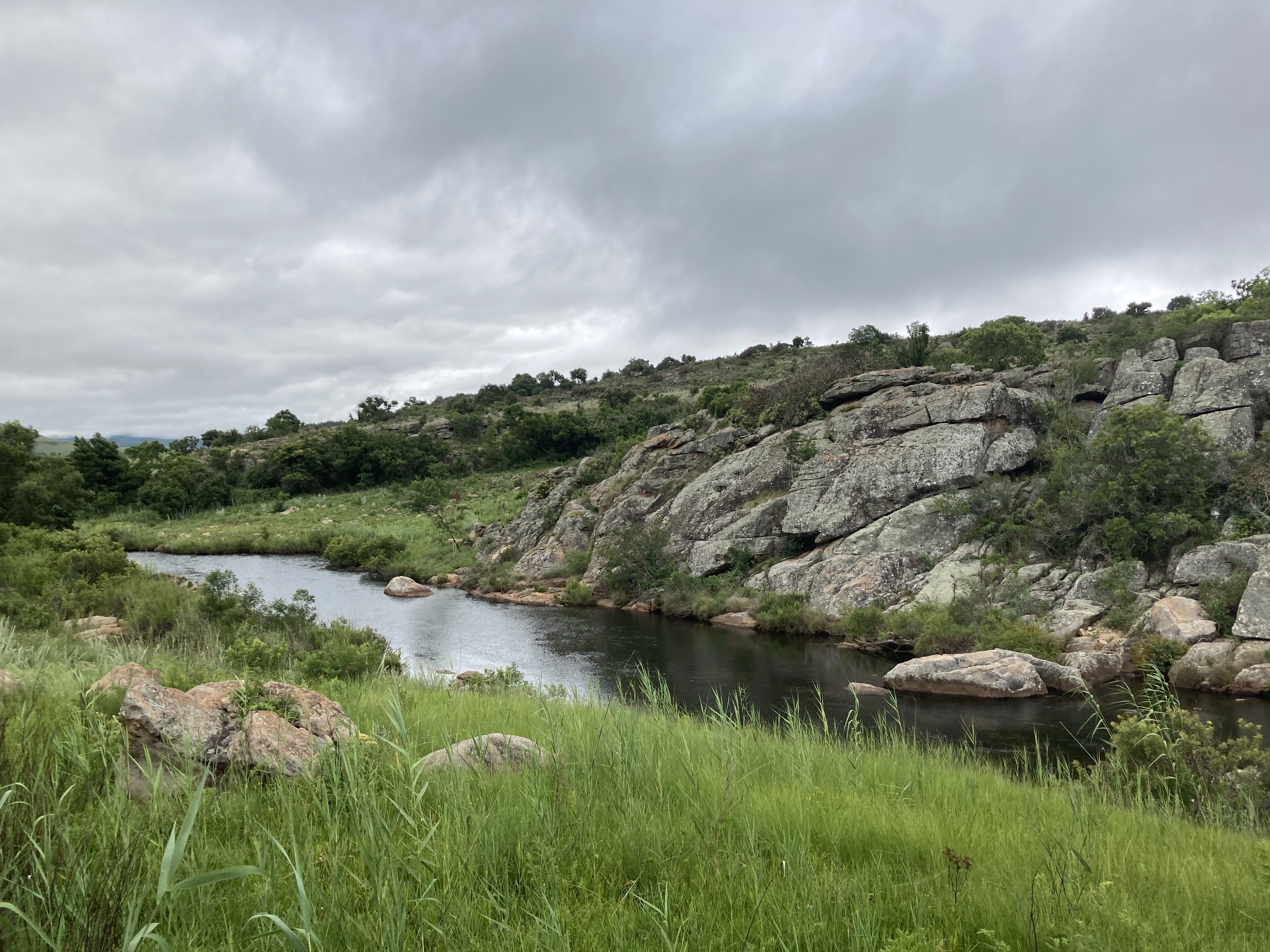
Treur River

== Demographics ==
Population density in Mpumalanga: <1 /km²; 1–3 /km²; 3–10 /km²; 10–30 /km²; 30–100 /km²; 100–300 /km²; 300–1000 /km²; 1000–3000 /km²; >3000 /km²

Dominant home languages in Mpumalanga: Afrikaans; English; Ndebele; Xhosa; Zulu; Pedi; Tswana; Swazi; Tsonga; No language dominant

Mpumalanga's population is 4,039,939 people (according to the 2011 census). The average population density is 52.81 people per km^{2}.

Some 30% of the people speak siSwati, the language of neighbouring Eswatini, with 26% speaking isiZulu, 10.3% isiNdebele, 10.2% Sepedi and 11.6% Xitsonga. As of the 2011 census, approximately 90.65% of Mpumalanga's population are Black, 7.51% are White, and 0.91% are Coloured and 0.69% are Indian or Asian.

== See also ==
- List of heritage sites in Mpumalanga
- List of speakers of the Mpumalanga Provincial Legislature
- Care For Wild rhinoceros sanctuary
