= List of Southern Ndebele people =

The following is a list of Southern Ndebele people.

== Kings, chiefs, princes and princess ==
- Ingwenyama Mayitjha II
- James Mahlangu
- Senteni Masango
- Nyabêla

== Academics ==
- Ntongela Masilela
- Jonas Sibanyoni

== Militants ==
- Themba Mabaso
- Solomon Mahlangu
- Davidson Masuku

== Religious ==
- Moses Mahlangu

== Politicians and activities ==
- Bongani Bongo
- Curtis Mabena
- Jacob Mabena
- Fish Mahlalela
- Dikeledi Mahlangu
- Gwen Mahlangu-Nkabinde
- James Mahlangu
- M. J. Mahlangu
- Ndaweni Mahlangu
- Norah Mahlangu
- Qedani Mahlangu
- Solomon Mahlangu
- Bonakele Majuba
- Mduduzi Manana
- James Masango
- Makhosazane Masilela
- Bandile Masuku
- Madala Masuku
- Busisiwe Mkhwebane
- Refilwe Mtsweni-Tsipane
- Pat Ngomane
- Lindiwe Ntshalintshali
- Busisiwe Shiba
- Gert Sibande
- Gijimani Skosana
- James Jim Skosana
- Maki Skosana

== Artists, actors and writers ==
- Sibusiso Khwinana
- Mduduzi Mabaso
- Nomuzi Mabena
- Cindy Mahlangu
- Esther Mahlangu
- Moses Mahlangu
- Sandile Mahlangu
- Vincent Mahlangu
- Lebohang Masango-Msiza
- Dumisani Masilela
- Bongani Masuku
- Thulani Mtsweni
- Gerard Sekoto
- Mbali Skosana

== Athletes ==
- Happy Jele
- Ndumiso Mabena
- Siyabonga Mabena
- Innocent Maela
- Bongani Mahlangu
- Bongani Mahlangu (cricketer)
- Duncan Mahlangu
- Jabu Mahlangu
- July Mahlangu
- May Mahlangu
- Ntando Mahlangu
- Sibusiso Mahlangu
- Thabang Mahlangu
- Victor Mahlangu
- Mandla Masango
- Dumisani Masilela
- Tsepo Masilela
- Khethokwakhe Masuku
- Menzi Masuku
- Thabo Mamojele
- Dumisa Ngobe
- Jonas Sibanyoni
- Nkosinathi Sibanyoni
- Thabang Sibanyoni
- Jerry Sikhosana
- Brian Skosana
- Lwazi Skosana
- Josia Thugwane
- Nothando Vilakazi

== Criminals ==
- Chris Mahlangu

== See also ==
- List of Xhosa people
- List of South Africans
- List of Zulu people
- List of South African office-holders
- Southern Ndebele people
