= Skosana =

Skosana is a surname. Notable people with the surname include:

- Ben Skosana (1947–2014), South African politician
- Brian Skosana (born 1991), South African rugby union player
- Gijimani Skosana (born 1978), South African politician in the National Assembly since 2017 and former mayor of Dr JS Moroka
- James Skosana (1962–2021), South African politician in the National Assembly (2009–2018) and Mpumalanga Provincial Legislature
- Lwazi Skosana (born 1991), South African footballer
- Maki Skosana (c. 1961–1985), South African woman who was burned to death

== See also ==
- SS Skosana Nature Reserve, protected area in South Africa
- Minister of Police v Skosana, South African law case
