= Masilela =

Masilela is a surname. Notable people with the surname include:

- Dumisani Masilela (1988–2017), South African actor, musician and soccer player
- Makhosazane Masilela (born 1980), South African politician
- Ntongela Masilela, South-African-born academic
- Tsepo Masilela (born 1985), South African soccer player
