= James Mahlangu =

South African politician and Ndebele prince (1953–2005)

Member of the Mpumalanga Provincial Legislature
- In office June 1999 – April 2000

Member of the National Assembly
- In office May 1994 – 1995

Chief Minister of KwaNdebele
- In office 1 May 1990 – 26 April 1994
- Preceded by: Jonas Mabena
- Succeeded by: Position abolished

Personal details
- Born: Senzangakhona James Mahlangu; 3 February 1953 eMthambothini, Weltevrede; Transvaal, Union of South Africa
- Died: 19 August 2005 (aged 52) Louis Pasteur Hospital, Pretoria; Gauteng, South Africa
- Party: African National Congress
- Other political affiliations: United Democratic Movement (1999–2000); Intando Yesizwe (until 1994)
- Education: University of Zululand; University of the North

Prince Senzangakhona James Mahlangu (3 February 1953 – 19 August 2005) was a South African politician and Ndebele prince of the Ndzundza royal family. He served as the last Chief Minister of the KwaNdebele bantustan between May 1990 and April 1994 and founded the bantustan's Intando Yesizwe party in 1990. Currently there is a school in Mogononong named after him Prince S.J Combined School

The son of Ndebele king Mabusabesala II and the brother of Mabusabesala's successor, Mayitjha II, Mahlangu rose to prominence as the de facto leader of the political opposition in KwaNdebele in the 1980s. He was an outspoken opponent of the apartheid-era policy of separate development and of proposals to grant nominal independence to KwaNdebele. He came to power in KwaNdebele at the outset of the democratic transition and subsequently joined the African National Congress (ANC) in 1994.

After KwaNdebele was dissolved, Mahlangu briefly represented the ANC in the post-apartheid National Assembly between 1994 and 1995. He later represented the opposition United Democratic Movement in the Mpumalanga Provincial Legislature from 1999 until 2000, when he returned to the ANC and took up a position in the Mpumalanga provincial government. He was granted formal status as Inkosi of the Ndzundza Mabusa Tribal Authority in Mpumalanga in late 2001 and held that position until his death in 2005.

== Early life and education ==
Mahlangu was born on 3 February 1953 in eMthambothini in Weltevrede in the former Transvaal. He was born into the Ndzundza royal family as the second-eldest son of the reigning Ndebele king, Ingwenyama Mabusabesala II (also known as David Mabhoko Mahlangu), and his wife Queen Johanna Selepi. His elder brother, Cornelius, later succeeded their father as monarch, reigning as Ingwenyama Mayitjha II.

Mahlangu matriculated in 1974 and the following year enrolled at the University of Zululand. In 1976, his studies were interrupted by the Soweto uprising, and Mahlangu himself joined the South African Students' Movement. He resumed his degree in 1978 at the University of the North, where he completed a bachelor's in administration.

== KwaNdebele homeland ==
=== Opposition to independence: 1981–1989 ===
In 1981, the apartheid government granted self-governing status to KwaNdebele, a bantustan devised to accommodate South Africa's Ndebele population under the policy of separate development. Although Mahlangu and other family members served in the KwaNdebele Legislative Assembly, the Ndzundza royal family was opposed to separate development and to independence. In later years, and particularly from 1986, Mahlangu himself was viewed as "the unofficial but de facto 'leader of the Opposition'" in KwaNdebele.

From around 1986, KwaNdebele was engulfed in a civil conflict between political elites who supported independence and anti-independence royalists. Mahlangu was viewed as a leader of the so-called "Comrades" movement, which was generally allied with the anti-apartheid United Democratic Front and which often clashed violently with Imbokodo, a pro-government vigilante group, and with KwaNdebele police forces. Mahlangu himself came under questioning for his own role in the comrades' use of violence against Imbokodo, including through alleged necklacings; he was later questioned on this subject at the Truth and Reconciliation Commission. Mahlangu was also a founding member of the Congress of Traditional Leaders of South Africa (Contralesa) in 1987 and he sent an envoy as part of Contralesa's delegation to a meeting with the anti-apartheid African National Congress (ANC).

In November 1986, the incumbent Chief Minister of KwaNdebele, Simon Skosana, died. In the immediate aftermath, as preparations for the election of Skosana's successor began, Mahlangu was one of several people detained by the bantustan police. He was released shortly before the vote and stood in the election, but he was defeated by George "Majozi" Mahlangu by 41 votes to his 25 votes.

The KwaNdebele government had withdrawn its recognition of the Ndzundza royal family in July 1985, but, under Majozi Mahlangu's government, Mahlangu faced further repressive state actions. The Truth and Reconciliation Commission later concluded that he was "continually harassed, detained, tortured and had his property destroyed by the Kwa-Ndebele Police" between 1986 and 1987. In late April 1987, Mahlangu and his brother were expelled from the legislative assembly, and Mahlangu was again detained by the police. The following week, the legislative assembly voted in favour of joining the so-called TBVC states in becoming a (nominally) independent republic.

=== Government: 1989–1994 ===
However, following the 1988 legislative election, Majozi Mahlangu was ousted by an anti-independence candidate, Jonas Mabena, who appointed James Mahlangu to his cabinet as Minister of Education and Culture. Mahlangu himself succeeded Mabena as Chief Minister of KwaNdebele in May 1990. He held that position throughout South Africa's democratic transition, leaving on 26 April 1994; thereafter, KwaNdebele was reintegrated into the republic, becoming part of the new Mpumalanga province. By then, Mahlangu had dissolved his political movement, Intando Yesizwe (formally launched in 1990), in favour of joining the ANC.

== Post-apartheid career ==
=== Parliament: 1994–1995 ===
In the 1994 general election, Mahlangu was elected to an ANC seat in the National Assembly, the lower house of the new South African Parliament. According to Jeff Peires, Mahlangu joined Parliament "under the impression that then President Nelson Mandela had promised him a seat in the national cabinet", but he was disappointed. His attendance record was notably poor: in one period, he missed almost 40 consecutive days of parliamentary sittings.

He resigned just over a year after his election, in May 1995, citing health reasons – he said that Cape Town was bad for his asthma. However, it was widely reported that he was expelled for his absenteeism.

=== Defection to the UDM: 1999–2000 ===
In 1999, Mahlangu joined the United Democratic Movement (UDM), a breakaway from the ANC, and became its provincial leader in Mpumalanga. In the general election of that year, he was elected as the UDM's sole representative in the Mpumalanga Provincial Legislature.

He resigned from the UDM and from the legislature less than a year later, in April 2000, again citing health reasons. The Mail & Guardian later reported that he had sought early retirement on the grounds that he had poorly controlled systemic hypertension and had incurred brain damage as a complication of recurrent cardiovascular accidents. It was also reported that his defection followed "public criticism of his perceived sabotaging of opposition initiatives" in Mpumalanga.

=== Return to the ANC and chieftaincy: 2000–2005 ===
However, soon after leaving the UDM, Mahlangu rejoined the ANC. In May 2000, he announced that he would be appointed director of traditional affairs in the provincial government of Mpumalanga, serving under Premier Ndaweni Mahlangu, a fellow member of the royal family and Mahlangu's former Deputy Chief Minister in KwaNdebele.

In 2001, Ingwenyama Mayitjha III, Mahlangu's brother, approached Premier Mahlangu to request that Mahlangu should be installed as the Inkosi of a new tribe. The tribe was established in terms of South African law on 28 September, called the Ndzundza Mabusa Tribal Authority and holding jurisdiction over Klipplaatdrift, Waterval and KwaMagula, rural areas in Mpumalanga province. Mahlangu became the traditional leader of the tribe with effect from 3 October 2001.

== Personal life and death ==
Mahlangu was married and had two children. He died on 19 August 2005 at Louis Pasteur Hospital in Pretoria. His eldest son, Sipho Mahlangu, also served in the Ndzundza Mabusa Traditional Council and chaired the National House of Traditional Leaders.
