= Mac Mathunjwa =

South African actor (1948-2021)

- Born: MacDonald Ndodana Mathunjwa; 15 July 1948; Johannesburg, South Africa
- Died: 1 June 2021 (aged 72); Tsakane, Gauteng, South Africa
- Other names: Bra Mac
- Occupations: Actor, Producer, Director, Musician
- Years active: 1980–2021
- Known for: Khululeka 1994, Ubambo Lwami 1991
- Height: 5 ft 8 in (173 cm)
- Children: 2

MacDonald 'Mac' Ndodana Mathunjwa (15 July 1948 – 1 June 2021), or affectionately known as Bra Mac, was a South African actor, producer, director and musician. He is best known for the father figure roles in the television serials and soap operas such as; Home Affairs, Generations, Soul City, Intsika, Khululeka, Bones of Bone.

== Personal life ==
Mathunjwa was born on 15 July 1948 in KwaThema in Springs, Johannesburg, South Africa. After the death of both parents, he moved to Johannesburg with his late brother, Madoda Mathunjwa.

His daughters, Makwande and Zanoxolo Mathunjwa, are also actresses and media personalities.

== Career ==
From 1989 to 1992 he starred alongside Menzi Ngubane, Daphney Hlomuka and veteran Don Eric Mlangeni amongst others in the popular Zulu drama series titled Ubambo Lwami, where he played the role of an antagonist terrorising the character of Mazwi (played by Menzi Ngubane). In 2008, Mathunjwa acted in the SABC1 mini-series uGugu no Andile. The musical serial is based on the Shakespearean play Romeo and Juliet. In 2010, he joined the cast of popular soap Generations and played the role of 'Mawande's Father' for some episodes. In 2010, he played the role of 'Tat'Ngcobo aka Vuzi' in the SABC1 drama series Home Affairs. The show became very popular where he continued to play the role for four seasons until 2013.

In 2011, he joined the SABC1 drama serial Intsika and starred as 'Tshibaphi'. Later in the same year, he acted in the serial Home Sweet Home. However, his most popular role came through the SABC1 comedy series Khululeka when he played the role of 'Oupa'. After quitting Home Affairs, he joined the fifth season of eKasi: Our Stories and played the role of 'Tata'. In 2014, he played the role of 'Bab' Jacob' in the eighth season of the soap Soul City.

In 2016, he joined season two of SABC1 sitcom Sgudi 'Snaysi and played the role of 'Derek'. In 2017, he played the supportive role of 'Rev Phiri' in the SABC2 drama series Bone of My Bones. In 2019, he appeared in the 1Magic thriller serial iThemba with the role of 'Tat'Mkhokheli'. Apart from that, he also acted in the short film Uzozwa Ngami.

As a prolific musician, he composed songs for many local groups, such as; the Soul Brothers, Amadodana Ase Wesile, Abigail Kubheka, and Mpharanyana Radebe. In humanitarian works, he was part of the process of building and strengthening the Living Legends Legacy Fraternity Trust, conducted by the Department of Sport, Arts and Culture. In December 2020, he attended the national summit. He owned a film production company called Mathunjwa Film Production.

== Death ==
Mathunjwa started having difficulty breathing late on 29 May 2021. He was rushed to the doctor on 30 May, where the doctor wrote a letter for him to be transferred to the hospital. He was admitted to the Pholosong Hospital on the same day. After two days, he died on 1 June 2021 from COVID-19 complications at the age of 72. His memorial service was held at Kwa-Thema Old Age Home in Springs Gauteng, East of Johannesburg on 4 June 2021.

== Filmography ==
Year	Film	Role	Genre	Ref.
2008	uGugu no Andile	Bishop Mbengashe	Film	
2010	Generations	Mawande's Father	Film	
2010	Home Affairs	Vuzi/Tat'Ngcobo	Film	
2011	Home Sweet Home	Maakaplan	Film	
2011	Intsika	Tshibaphi	Film	
2012	Stokvel	Mr. Pink	Film	
2013	eKasi: Our Stories	Tata	Film	
2014	Loxion Lyric	Old Musician	Film	
2014	Soul City	Bab' Jacob	Film	
2016	Sgudi 'Snaysi	Derek	Film	
2017	Bone of My Bones	Rev Phiri	Film	
2019	iThemba	Tat'Mkhokheli	Film	
