= 1988 KwaNdebele legislative election =

Parliamentary elections were held in KwaNdebele between 8 and 10 December 1988. A total of 54 candidates contested the 16 elected seats.

== Electoral system ==
The territory's Legislative Assembly had sixteen elected members, together with others appointed by tribal authorities and the Chief Minister.
