= Mayitjha II =

Southern Ndebele monarch (1947–2005)

Ingwenyama (King) Mayitjha II

King of the Southern Ndebele Nation (Ndzundza)
- Reign: 1992 – 30 June 2005
- Predecessor: Mabusabesala II
- Successor: Mabhoko III
- Born: Nyumbabo Cornelius Mahlangu; 2 June 1947 eMthambothini, Transvaal; Union of South Africa
- Died: 30 June 2005 (aged 58)
- Relatives: James Mahlangu (brother)

Ingwenyama uMayitjha II (2 June 1947 – 30 June 2005), born Nyumbabo Cornelius Mahlangu, was the king of the Southern Ndebele Ndzundza nation in Mpumalanga, South Africa. He succeeded his father, Ingwenyama Mabusabesala II, and his reign lasted from 1992 until his death in 2005.

During apartheid, while the Southern Ndebele were governed as nominal citizens of the KwaNdebele bantustan, Mayitjha served in several positions in the cabinet of the Chief Minister of KwaNdebele but was also a prominent opponent of separate development.

== Early life and career ==
He was born on 2 June 1947 in eMthambothini in the former Eastern Transvaal. His father was the reigning Ndebele king Ingwenyama Mabusabesala II (David Mabhoko Mahlangu II), himself the son of Ingwenyama Mayitjha I (Cornelius Mahlangu II). They were the descendants of the great King of the Ndzundza Ndebele, Ingwenyama uMabhoko ka Magodongo.

During his early life, Mayitjha pursued business interests in construction and farming, and he began a political career in 1969 as a member of the Ndzundza Tribal Authority, established in terms of the apartheid-era Bantu Authorities Act to govern the Southern Ndebele people of the region.

== KwaNdebele government: 1979–1992 ==
In 1979, when the apartheid government established the KwaNdebele homeland, Mayitjha served as the bantustan's inaugural Minister of Education. He served in that office until 1984, when he became Minister of Health. However, Mayitjha and his family were prominent opponents of the government's proposal to accept (nominal) independence from South Africa, and he and his brother were expelled from the KwaNdebele Legislative Assembly in late April 1987.

When his brother, Prince James Mahlangu, became Chief Minister of KwaNdebele, Mayitjha returned to government and served as Minister of Public Works from 1990 to 1992.

== Reign: 1992–2005 ==
In 1992, following his father's death, he was crowned as Ingwenyama. At the time of his death, the Nhlapo Commission on Traditional Leadership Disputes and Claims was ongoing, and Mayitjha was in talks with King Makhosonke II of the Manala royal house about unifying the Southern Ndebele nation under a single monarch. He died on 30 June 2005.

== Personal life ==
He married for the first time in 1975, wedding Princess Siphila Dlamini of Swaziland, after which he married Princess Lena Masilela, followed by Nomsa Sanny-flora Mtsweni, Gabisile Elizabeth Mabona, Nomsa Daphane Mdaka and Lizzy Pumzile Mabona. In 2004, he told the Washington Post that he had "plus-minus 20" children; he is recorded as having 20 children from his marriages and others from five informal liaisons.
