= Tim Lopes =

Tim Lopes may refer to:

- Tim Lopes (journalist) (1950–2002), Brazilian investigative journalist
- Tim Lopes (baseball) (born 1994), American professional baseball player

== See also ==
- Tim Lopez
