= Tim Lopes (journalist) =

Brazilian investigative reporter (1950–2002)

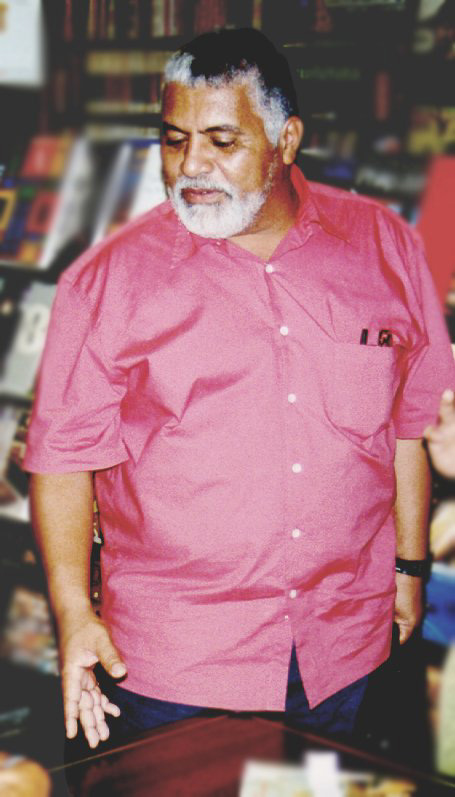
- Tim Lopes
- Born: Arcanjo Antonino Lopes do Nascimento; November 18, 1950; Pelotas, Rio Grande do Sul, Brazil
- Died: June 2, 2002 (aged 51); Favela da Grota, Complexo do Alemão, Rio de Janeiro, Brazil
- Cause of death: Assassination
- Occupation: Investigative journalist
- Known for: In-depth features about people and culture of Rio de Janeiro

Tim Lopes (Note: Brazilian Portuguese pronunciation: [ˈtʃĩ ˈlɔpis].) (born Arcanjo Antonino Lopes do Nascimento; (Note: Brazilian Portuguese pronunciation: [aʁˈkɐ̃ʒu ɐ̃toˈninu ˈlɔpis du nasiˈmẽj̃tu].) November 18, 1950 – June 2, 2002) was a Brazilian investigative journalist and producer for the Brazilian television network Rede Globo. In 2002, the media reported him missing while working undercover on a story in one of Rio's favelas. It was later learned that Lopes had been accosted by drug traffickers who controlled the area, was kidnapped, driven to the top of a neighboring favela in the trunk of a car, tied to a tree and subjected to a mock trial, tortured by having his hands, arms, and legs severed with a sword while still alive, and then had his body necklaced – a practice that traffickers have dubbed micro-ondas (in allusion to the microwave oven).

The details of Lopes's death received substantial attention in Brazil's media because of the barbarity of the crime and due to it highlighting the existence of poder paralelo (parallel power) within Rio—meaning criminals controlling areas of the city with impunity.

== Early life and personal life ==
Arcanjo Antonino Lopes do Nascimento was born in Pelotas, Brazil, the fourth child of a family of twelve. When he was 8 years old, his parents moved the family to Rio de Janeiro, where they lived in humble circumstances in the Mangueira favela in a three-room shanty.

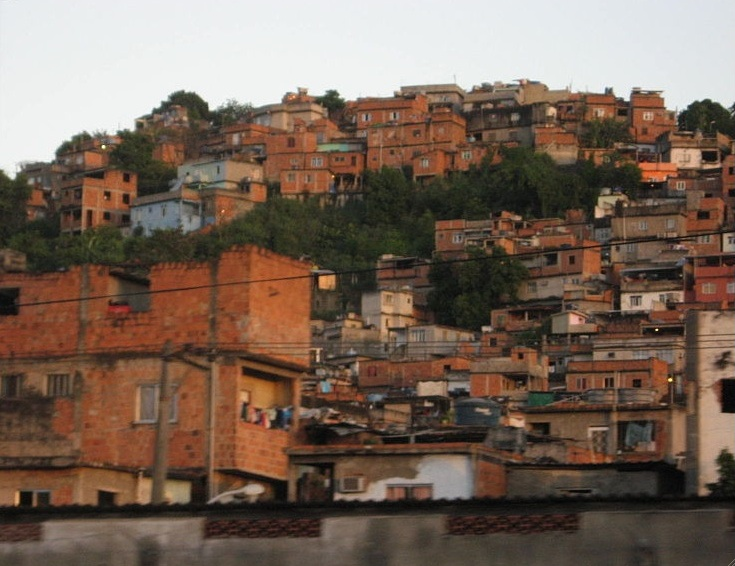
Hill which is part of the Mangueira favela where Lopes grew up in Rio de Janeiro

Mangueira is home to the samba school, Mangueira and is located on a hill near Maracanã football stadium.

Years later as a journalist, Lopes produced a piece about Mangueira samba and one of its founders, the Carioca sambista Carlos Cachaça. Cachaça saw the story and commented to a sambista friend, Monarco, of the Velha Guarda da Portela, that Lopes's reporting was "the best material that he had ever seen" on Mangueira. In 2002, Lopes was co-writing a book, about Mangueira samba school and his experience growing up there, with Alexander Medeiros.

Lopes was one of the founders of the carnival block "Simpatia é quase amor" ("sympathy is almost like love"), of Ipanema, and had served as an official judge of the annual carnival procession at the Sambadrome Marquês de Sapucaí. He was a dedicated fan of the professional Rio football club, Vasco da Gama.

Lopes lived with his wife Alessandra Wagner and her son Diogo. Lopes also had a nineteen-year-old son, Bruno, from a previous marriage, with whom he maintained a father-son relationship. Although Lopes was born Gaucho (native resident of Rio Grande do Sul), "he was a stereotypical Carioca" (native resident of Rio de Janeiro), always smiling with a friendly disposition and knowing every corner of Rio. He was at ease hanging out with wealthy residents in Leblon or with those living in poor areas of the city or on the street, and in speaking street slang.

== Career ==
Tim Lopes attended journalism school at the Faculdade Hélio Alonso (FACHA) in Rio de Janeiro and during his career wrote for the Rio newspapers O Globo, O Dia, and Jornal do Brasil. As part of an investigative piece in 1978, Lopes worked at a construction site on Rio's underground Metro to highlight difficult working conditions in the stifling heat. Lopes won a Brazilian journalism award called the Prêmio Abril de Jornalismo in both 1985 and 1986 for feature stories involving football in the sports magazine Placar.

Tim Lopes's journalism colleagues described him as an old-school type reporter who gleaned his stories from researching on the street as opposed to sitting in an air-conditioned office browsing the Internet for ideas. A consistent theme of Tim Lopes's reporting was to show how low-income citizens living within Rio's favelas could be subjected to terror and powerlessness under the 'law of the traffickers.' Lopes felt that the government had ceded control of poor neighborhoods to violent drug traffickers. An example of this was the series he wrote for the Rio newspaper O Dia in 1994 entitled, "Funk: Som, Alegria, e Terror," (Funk: Sound, Joy, and Terror). The story described certain baile funk run by traffickers (baile funk are dance concerts held in favelas featuring live performers singing a style of rap called Rio Funk).

His first foray into broadcast journalism was for the popular newsmagazine program Fantástico on the Globo network. During one assignment in 1995, Lopes posed as a street vendor while concealing a camera within a cooler. His aim was to shine a journalistic light on the risks posed to ordinary citizens of Rio of being mugged or assaulted by thieves, as this was a particularly acute reality at that time. During the course of the investigation, Lopes witnessed a dramatic scene which was all caught on camera: A group of teenagers mug a pedestrian couple in Rio's Centro business district, with one of the thieves wielding a large knife. When a taxi driver scares the mugger off by firing a revolver, the boy runs into heavy traffic on Avenida Presidente Vargas and is violently killed when he is hit by a city bus. Several Globo cameras were filming the entire episode from different angles, which was shown during the report (a black bar covered a portion of the frame at the moment the boy was killed). The scene weighed on Lopes's mind for a long time.

Lopes became a producer at Rede Globo in 1996. In 2001 Lopes and his team at Rede Globo received the Prêmio Esso (Brazil's version of the Pulitzer) for an investigative series entitled "Feirão das Drogas" ("Big Drug Fair"), in which he used a hidden camera to show dealers on the street openly hawking cocaine to passing pedestrians, yelling out the drug and its price. His footage also captured armed traffickers parading past on motorcycles with AK-47s. This footage was shot in a dense network of favelas in the Zona Norte called the Complexo do Alemão (German Complex); more specifically within the Complexo this particular area is known as the Grota.

One of the reporters working on Lopes's team to collect undercover footage for the same investigative report was Globo journalist Cristina Guimarães. She filmed in the Rio favelas of Mangueira and Rocinha during the same time period. The report was televised in Brazil on the program Jornal Nacional on August 3, 2001. The report got a lot of attention, which in turn caused Rio's political administration to take action. Police crackdowns followed, and dealers in the favela da Grota, and the other favelas featured were prevented from openly selling drugs on the street for a while, and some were arrested. Subsequently, the drug lords of the criminal factions controlling these areas were not happy with the decrease in revenues. One of the dealers arrested, known as Ratinho (literally, "Little Rat"), would subsequently be involved in Lopes's death.

Tim Lopes and his team were awarded Brazil's top journalism prize for the report which was titled "Feirão das Drogas" ("Big Drug Fair") - the first Prêmio Esso given for broadcast investigative journalism in Brazil.

In 2002 Lopes started working on a story about long-distance truck drivers that traverse Brazil (caminhoneiros) for Globo TV.

== Death ==
=== Kidnapping ===
On the afternoon of June 2, 2002, Lopes left his apartment in a middle class section of Rio's Copacabana neighborhood.

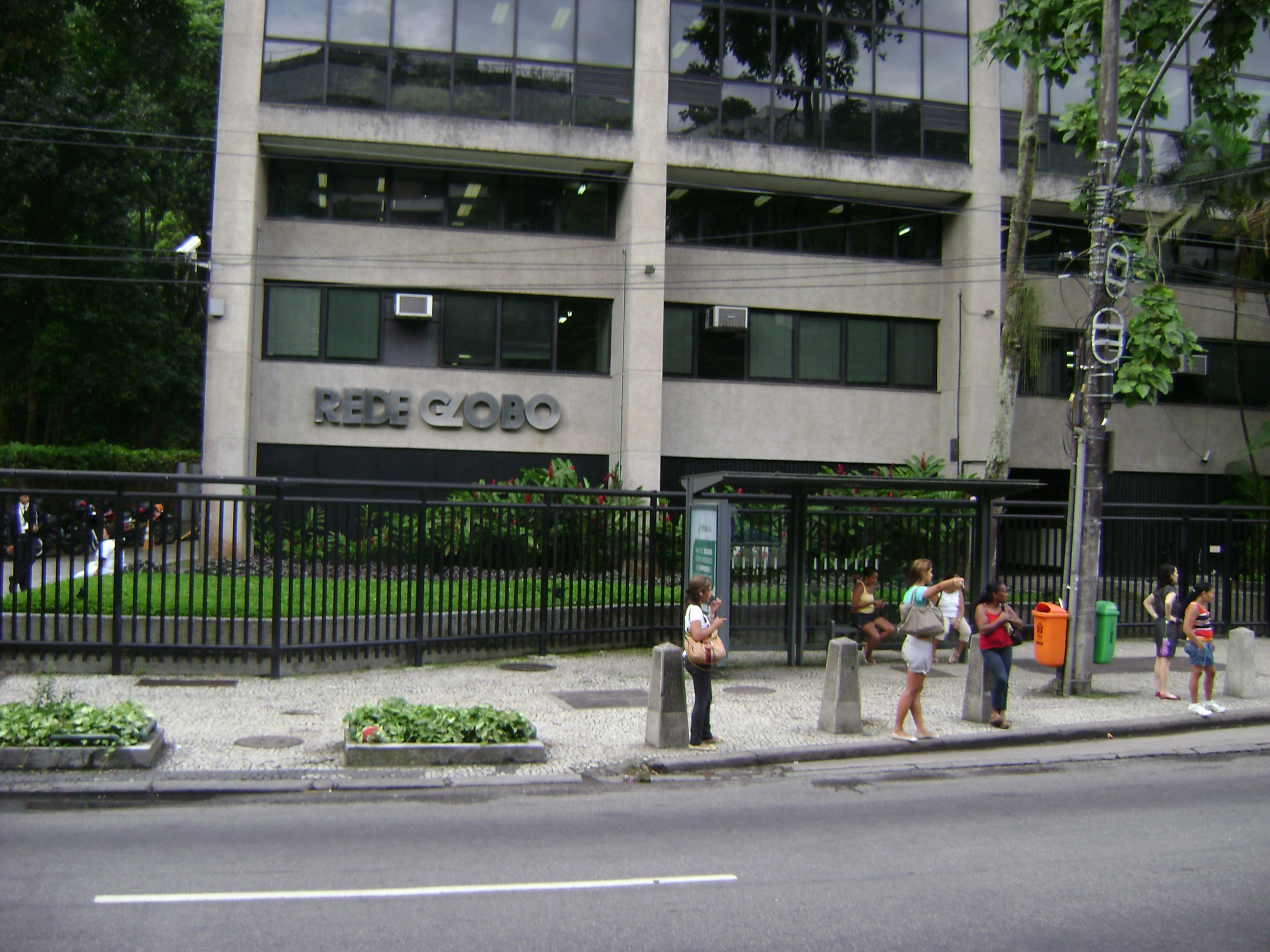
Rede Globo headquarters in Rio's Jardim Botânico neighborhood, where Lopes began working in the broadcast news division in the mid-1990s as an investigative journalist and producer.

He was heading to the Vila Cruzeiro favela after first stopping by his office at Rede Globo, where he had been a broadcast producer since 1996. César Sebra, the man who was Lopes's boss for six years at Rede Globo, recalled: "Most of the journalists working at Globo's offices are middle-class. Only a few people live like Tim used to live in the favelas."

Lopes had heard that the gang of drug traffickers who controlled Vila Cruzeiro were putting on a baile funk that night, at which local residents had informed him that traffickers were promoting child prostitution. Lopes had previously confided to colleagues that he was feeling tired and wanted to take a break from the agitation and violence of the city and find a rural retreat somewhere where he could recuperate. "The deeper in the jungle the better," he told them. His awareness of drugs and crime plaguing the city, and the lack of social services for youth to deal with these problems, seemed to drain him of energy.

Rio's poor communities, the favelas, had been neglected for decades and were considered outside the control of the State. Filling in this power vacuum were young drug traffickers, who patrolled the favelas with automatic weapons. In addition to drug selling, traffickers in certain favelas were sexually exploiting minors from the community at their baile funk, sometimes forcing girls to put on explicit shows by having sex out in the open against a wall at these events.

Residents were telling Lopes that girls from the local community who didn't participate in the baile funk were targeted for reprisals. Since residents could not seek redress from the police, they instead sought help from Lopes. Nassif Elias Sobrinho, president of the Rio journalist union, recalled: "Tim Lopes was called because there was no one to hear their problems. The community told the police many times and nothing was done."

After leaving his office that afternoon at the Rede Globo television studios, where he left his "cell phone, wallet, and dress shirt," Lopes went to the Penha Shopping Mall where he rigged himself with a hidden camera. He was using a micro-camera concealed within a small pack at his waist. One of the purposes of this baile funk was to draw crowds from other neighborhoods, so Lopes's presence there would not have made him a target in and of itself. However, the "Feirão das Drogas" report from the previous year had received a lot of attention and led to numerous arrests. Furthermore, after Lopes and his team had been granted the Prêmio Esso, his image was subsequently broadcast all over Rio.

On the afternoon of June 2, Lopes decided to film at a drug-selling location (boca de fumo) along Rua Oito (Eighth Street) in the Vila Cruzeiro favela. Lopes's aim was to obtain footage of drugs and weapons, as he had in 2001 in the favela da Grota within the Complexo do Alemão. It was later learned that before this night, Lopes had recently filmed in Vila Cruzeiro three different times.

Inside Vila Cruzeiro, Lopes went to a bar and bought a beer, then walked across the street and hung out on the sidewalk while filming armed traffickers driving by on motorcycles. Lopes was accosted by two members of the criminal faction who controlled Vila Cruzeiro and most of the Complexo do Alemão (often just referred to as "o Complexo"), André da Cruz Barbosa and Maurício de Lima Matias. As is common in the criminal underworld, the traffickers were known by their nicknames: André "Capeta" (André the Devil) and "Boizinho" (literally, Little Ox). A young boy had earlier approached Lopes when he was at the bar, and he did not know that the boy was a lookout for a drug dealer. The traffickers became suspicious when someone noticed a small light coming from the pack at Lopes's waist, where his camera was concealed, and reported it to one of the armed traffickers.

Upon being confronted, Lopes stated that he was a journalist from Rede Globo. They asked for his journalist credentials, which Lopes did not carry when working undercover. Lopes was subsequently beaten at the scene. Using a Nextel radio, the traffickers called the head drug lord, Elias Pereira da Silva, known by his nickname, Elias "Maluco" (literally, "Crazy Elias" or "Madman Elias"), at the faction's headquarters at the favela da Grota within the Complexo do Alemão for instructions. They were told to wait for a car to pick them up to transport Lopes from Vila Cruzeiro across the hills to the top of the Grota in the Complexo do Alemão where Elias Maluco was waiting for what he viewed as the captured "trophy". Before putting him into the trunk of a stolen Fiat Palio, the traffickers shot Lopes in either his feet or legs and tied his hands behind his back.

=== Murder ===
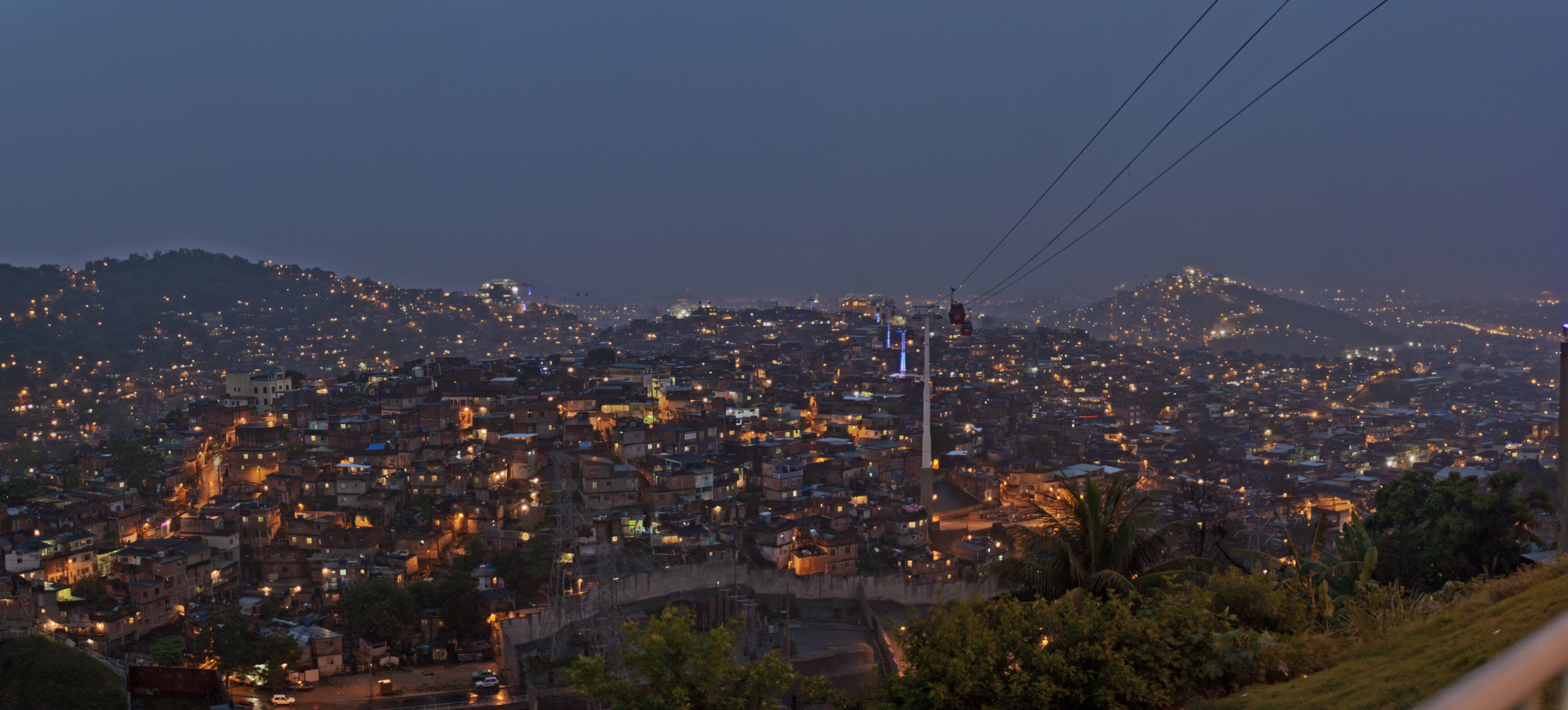
The Complexo do Alemão.

The traffickers drove Lopes along a winding back dirt road leading away from the Vila Cruzeiro favela (which is situated in Penha) and into the Complexo do Alemão network of favelas, a distance of about 5 kilometers (3.1 miles) on winding roads through hilly terrain (this also being the same route used by groups of fleeing criminals brandishing assault rifles when military police units and the Brazilian military invaded Vila Cruzeiro during the 2010 Rio de Janeiro security crisis). Upon arriving at the Favela da Grota (which was the headquarters of the criminal faction who controlled the Complexo), Tim Lopes was met by Elias Maluco. Once they pulled Lopes out of the car trunk he was recognized by one of the traffickers, Cláudio Orlando do Nascimento, known by the nickname "Ratinho" (literally, "Little Rat"). (Lopes had filmed Ratinho on the street in the Grota the previous year while Ratinho was cleaning an automatic rifle; the footage was aired as part of the "Feirão das Drogas" report). Also present were other traffickers named Xuxa and Zeu.

Elias Maluco and other traffickers then transported Lopes to a nearby hill within the Complexo called Pedra do Sapo. The sides of the hill are densely packed with the type of brick shacks typical of favelas, but the geography at the top of the hill features a desolate, grassy plateau with scattered small trees and a rudimentary football field. For many years these hilltops were used by leaders of drug trafficking gangs as sanctuary from law enforcement; they now feature the stations of a gondola transport system connecting the Complexo, operational since July 2011.

The traffickers tied Lopes to a tree. Ratinho was convinced that this was the same Tim Lopes that did the television report in 2001, resulting in his arrest and interference with the gang's drug profits. For this, he insisted that Lopes had to die. Lopes pleaded for his life, but he was told that he would die. One of the traffickers who was present, Frei, later told detectives that there were more than twenty people present at the scene, nine of whom participated in Lopes's murder.

They burned Lopes's eyes with a cigarette. In a "macabre ritual" of violence, using a katana or a "ninja"-type sword, Elias Maluco cut off Lopes' hands, arms, and legs while Lopes was still alive. The other traffickers, including André "Capeta" and Ratinho, also participated in the torture. Police were later told that there was blood on several of the traffickers that were gathered around. Lopes was placed within several tires, covered in diesel fuel, and set on fire. This process, which had become institutionalized among traffickers within Rio's most violent favelas at the time, was referred to as micro-ondas (literally, "microwave oven")

=== Investigation ===
Detective Daniel Gomes learned through speaking to shopkeepers and others in Vila Cruzeiro that Lopes had arrived at the favela in the afternoon and was accosted by traffickers at around 8:00. Before entering Vila Cruzeiro, he had arranged to have someone wait in a car outside of the favela in order to give him a ride home at a certain time. The driver continued to wait until midnight, at which point he contacted Rede Globo. Individuals at Globo subsequently waited until 11:00 am before contacting the police. At that time, a Globo attorney entered a nearby police station with the driver from the previous night and spoke with Inspector Daniel Gomes, the chief detective in charge of the Lopes case.

When Gomes started investigating in Vila Cruzeiro that Monday, the word on the street was electric, as residents spoke about a man who had been captured and beaten by traffickers. It was related that the traffickers had taken this man to the top of Vila Cruzeiro hill and incinerated him. Gomes was directed to the area and found burned tires, fresh blood, and human remains. It seemed to the police at the moment that Lopes' fate ended at that location, but through DNA testing they discovered that it was, in fact, not Lopes.

Rio police detective Daniel Gomes looking over the area at the top of Pedra do Sapo hill where Tim Lopes was tied to a tree and tortured, and where charred bone fragments from Lopes were uncovered by Gomes and his team. The Pedra do Sapo favela is nearby, albeit not visible in this image.

Days after Lopes' disappearance, two suspect traffickers were arrested by the 38ª DP-Brás de Pina Military Police in the Morro da Caixa DÁgua, which is in Penha near Vila Cruzeiro. Both traffickers were part of Elias Maluco's gang. During interrogation, they went into detail and explained the entire course of events, stating that it was Elias Maluco who assassinated Tim Lopes. They described how Lopes was transported by car to the Grota in the Complexo do Alemão to meet Elias Maluco and others of the gang and how Lopes was recognized from television and made to suffer humiliation and torture and his body burned to destroy evidence. This led the detective, with substantial reinforcements, to diligently search the Grota and the Pedra do Sapo for Lopes' remains.

On June 11, detectives following an anonymous tip discovered a secret grave site in a field near a rudimentary football field at the top of Pedra do Sapo hill. There they uncovered a few burned bone fragments of several individuals. Through DNA testing they were able to positively identify a small part of a rib belonging to Lopes. Also found buried at the site were Lopes' wristwatch, his crucifix, and the micro-camera that he had been using that night. There was also what remained of a burned ninja sword.

Gomes' final police report was 658 pages in length. Gomes concluded in his investigation that Lopes had not filmed at the baile funk in Vila Cruzeiro that night, but that he filmed traffickers dealing drugs and carrying guns that night. Lopes' boss at Globo said that Lopes was working on a story about sexual exploitation at the baile funk, with the understanding that he would have tried to obtain footage at the baile funk had he not been accosted relatively early in the night. Gomes wrote that if Globo would have notified the police at midnight on June 2, there was still a chance that Lopes' life could have been saved through police interdiction.

The Globo program Jornal Nacional subsequently televised a response, including an editorial by newscaster William Bonner criticizing Gomes' report. Jornal Nacional stated that Lopes' recorded footage was incinerated that night and that the community at Vila Cruzeiro had asked for Lopes help concerning minors being prostituted at the baile funk in their community. Jornal Nacional also stated that Tim Lopes was the behind-the-scene producer for 2001's "Feirão de Drogas", so his likeness would not necessarily have been well-known. Rio Governor Benedita da Silva subsequently took Gomes off of the case.

On July 7, Lopes's remains were buried at the Jardim da Saudade cemetery in the Rio suburb of Sulacap. State governor Benedita da Silva attended the funeral.

Five years after Lopes's death, a teenager was arrested in southern Brazil who had been at the scene of his murder. Then going by the name Cinqüenta (literally, "Fifty"), he was a 12-year-old boy in 2002 when he was told to buy diesel fuel and bring it to the top of the hill in order to set fire to Lopes. Upon his arrest in 2007, he gave police a detailed account of that night and spoke to a group of journalists, adding to what had been previously said during the investigation.

=== Traffickers involved ===
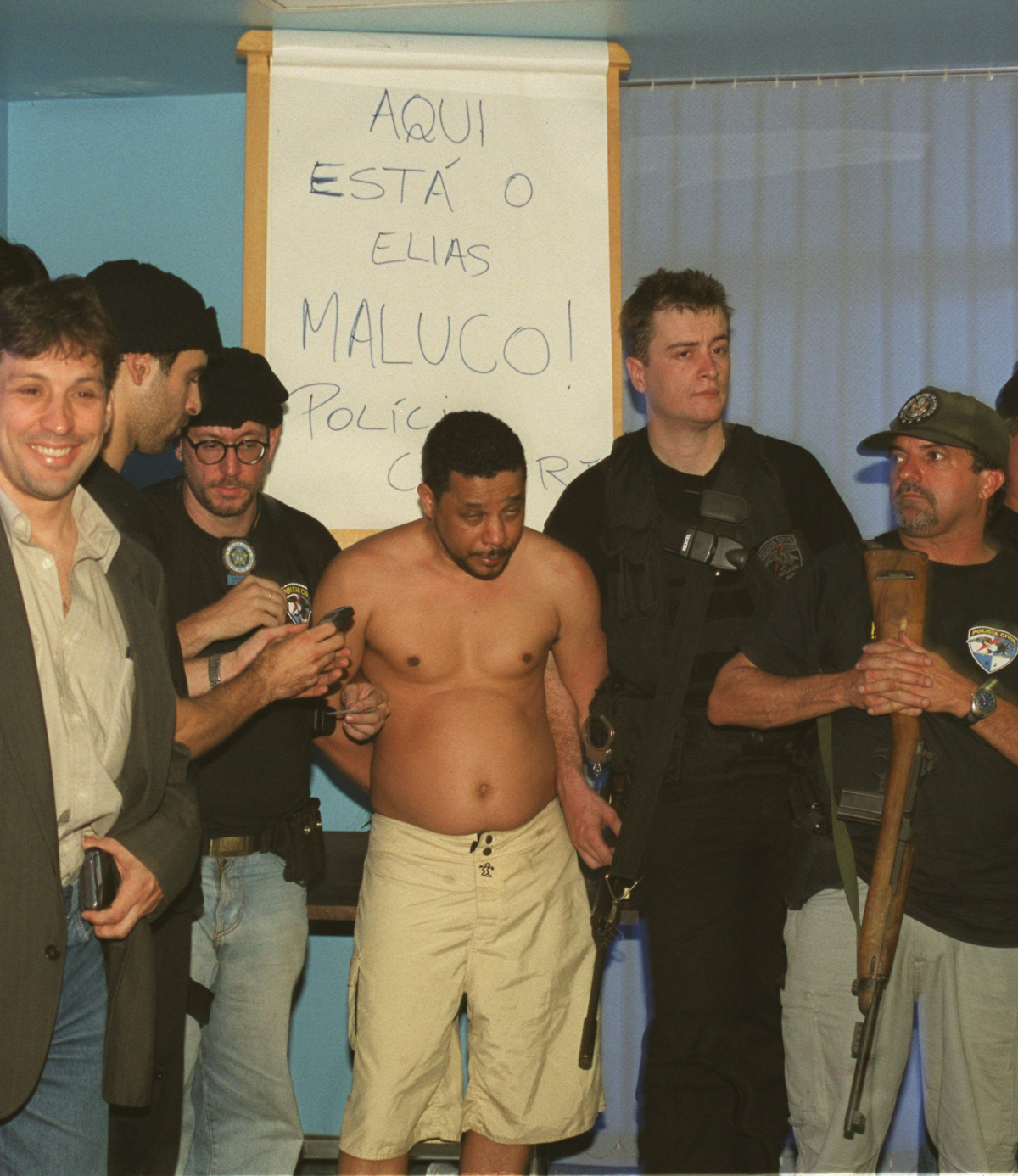
Elias Maluco as he was being presented to the media by the civil police, September 19, 2002. He had been apprehended in the Favela da Grota, Complexo do Alemão

The nine traffickers who were sought by police, and eventually stood trial and put behind bars were, ordered in terms of the degree of their culpability in Lopes's torture and murder: Elias Pereira da Silva (Elias "Maluco"), the gang leader; André da Cruz Barbosa (André "Capeta"), Elias's right-hand man; Cláudio Orlando do Nascimento ("Ratinho"); Maurício de Lima Matias ("Boizinho"); Claudino dos Santos Coelho (Xuxa); Elizeu Felício de Souza ("Zeu"); Ângelo da Silva ("Primo"); Reinaldo Amaral de Jesus ("Cadê"); and Fernando Sátyro da Silva ("Frei").

After an intensive and highly publicized 3½-month man-hunt, Elias Maluco was captured by police in the Favela da Grota on September 19, 2002. On May 25, 2005 he was given a prison sentence of 28½ years. Years later, he was transferred to the max-security prison in Catanduvas, where he was held until his mysterious death in September 2020.

Of the group of traffickers involved who were subsequently pursued, three were killed by police, and others were sentenced to prison. After their incarceration, anger was expressed through Rio's media when two of the traffickers were paroled on work release at which point they fled. Both have since been recaptured.

Among those convicted of Lopes's murder, Claudino dos Santos Coelho ("Xuxa"), and Cláudio Orlando do Nascimento ("Ratinho") were each sentenced to 23 years and 6 months' incarceration.

Ratinho took an active part in torturing Lopes and was strongly in favor of killing Lopes when they conducted a mock trial. Ratinho had been one of the traffickers featured in the "Big Drug Fair" report from the previous year, which had resulted in a period of police crackdowns. (In 2011 he was charged with assault while in prison after throwing boiling water on his girlfriend during a conjugal visit).

Claudino dos Santos Coelho (known by the nicknames "Xuxa" and "Russão") escaped from the Bangu penitentiary in Rio's Zona Oeste in February 2013, along with 30 other prisoners, by tunneling to a sewer. By September 2013, he was one of those leading a gang of sixty heavily armed bandits ensconced in the jungled hills above Rio (between Covanca and Lins de Vasconcelos) as a home base from which they preyed on neighborhoods. When the police special forces unit of BOPE mounted an operation against them in September 2013 he and another trafficker were killed in the ensuing gun battle along with a lieutenant of BOPE.

Elizeu Felício de Souza ("Zeu") was responsible for setting fire to Lopes's body. In 2007 he was paroled, at which point he fled to the Complexo do Alemão, which was an area outside of police interference at that time. Zeu was later secretly filmed working as a drug trafficker in the Complexo do Alemão. It was only in 2010 when military and police units invaded the network of favelas in the Complexo that they discovered him hiding in a house in a part of the Complexo known as Coqueiro. He was taken into custody. The arrest was widely publicized and applauded in Rio's media.

Ângelo Ferreira da Silva ("Primo") was sentenced to nine years. After he had completed a sixth of his total sentence he was let out of prison on work release, at which point he fled. He was recaptured by police in the Rio suburb of Santa Cruz in May 2010.

Other traffickers implicated in Lopes's torture and murder were André da Cruz Barbosa (André "Capeta"), who cut off Lopes's legs and ordered others to burn the body; Flávio Reginaldo dos Santos ("Buda"); and Maurício de Lima Matias ("Boizinho"), who were all killed in confrontations with police.

=== Aftermath ===
Though a prominent journalist, Tim Lopes only became nationally known after his death in a crime that shocked the country. The television program Jornal Nacional pursued the story, which increased the pressure on the authorities to capture the criminals involved; and O Globo newspaper and TV began using the term poder paralelo ("parallel power") to describe the paradigm of that time of criminal gangs controlling certain favelas within Rio with impunity.

Rio journalist Jorge Antonio Barros, who has been writing about Rio's favelas and the crime beat since the 1980s and was a colleague of Lopes at Globo, wrote that Lopes's death served to snap him out of the dream state, to which people sometimes fall prey, of romanticizing "the malandro;" and that his death reminded people who don't have to live in favelas under the "law of the trafficker" of the terror that exists as a daily reality.

Another colleague of Lopes at Globo was journalist César Seabra, who wrote: "The death of Tim Lopes opened our eyes to a new reality. Now our dilemma is to figure out how to report stories from the areas controlled by drug dealers." Seabra wrote in response to Lopes's death that the culture of crime reporting at that time needed to change: "We're tired of giving the criminals the front page. We're tired of interviewing the criminal on TV. We're tired of empowering the criminal in order to get an exclusive."

"The reflections about journalism generated by Lopes's killing led to the creation of the Brazilian Association of Investigative Journalism (Abraji in Portuguese) in December of that year".

Tim Lopes was honored in a São Paulo carnaval (carnival) procession in 2003 by the samba school, Acadêmicos do Tucuruvi, with the theme "Do not shut my voice," a tribute to a free press, with lyrics such as, "the truth Tim-Tim by Tim-Tim," in reference to his nickname.

A street has since been named after Tim Lopes in Rio's west suburb of Barra da Tijuca. It is called Avenida Tim Lopes. The change was lobbied by the Sindicato dos Jornalistas Profissionais do Município do Rio (Union of Professional Journalists of the City of Rio).

When a new public high school was built in the Complexo do Alemão, it was named Colégio Tim Lopes. From time to time, on the anniversary of Lopes's death, students have artistic performances and other expressions to memorialize Lopes.

==== Police invades Vila Cruzeiro and the Complexo ====
On November 25, 2010, Rio's special forces battalion (BOPE), supported by other police units, entered Vila Cruzeiro in Penha via Brazilian Marine armored transport to various points within the slum and ultimately took control of the hill and the surrounding area of Penha. This action was in response to attacks throughout Rio by the criminal faction headquartered there. Military and civil police units (which included CORE, Batalhão de Choque, Federal Police, among others) then took over the territory of the network of favelas comprising the Complexo do Alemão with support from the Brazilian Armed Forces. Thousands of soldiers of the Brazilian military were stationed throughout these communities during the subsequent two years.

During the 2010 Rio de Janeiro security crisis, after BOPE reached strategic points at the top of Vila Cruzeiro hill via tanks driven by Brazilian Marines, Rio's media showed live aerial footage of a multitude of criminals frantically fleeing on foot over the dirt back roads that exited into the Complexo do Alemão. This was the same route that the kidnapped Tim Lopes traveled in a car trunk when he was being transported from Vila Cruzeiro to the Complexo do Alemão.

Several Brazilian journalists visited these favelas in the days after the security forces took control and discussed what the changes meant. (During a time period after Tim Lopes's death, when journalists would enter favelas housing criminal factions associated with the traffickers who killed Lopes, they would sometimes hear "vai ter mais Tim, vai ter mais Tim!" (There will be more Tims!) as a warning insinuating that more reporters could be killed.)

==== UPPs established ====
In June 2012, ten years after Tim Lopes's death, the Complexo do Alemão began to be under the umbrella of eight new Pacifying Police Units (UPPs) at the predetermined conclusion of the military's presence. The UPPs cover the areas of the Complexo do Alemão (which comprises 13 favelas) and Penha. Just the Complexo itself is policed by 1,200 UPP officers (it was announced in July 2012 that the number would be increased to 1,800). One of the UPPs within the Complexo covers the area of the Pedra do Sapo, which is the hill and upper field where an anonymous tip led detectives to discover a clandestine cemetery which contained some fragments of Lopes's bones and some of his personal effects.

In December 2010, a mass was held to commemorate Lopes in a church in the Complexo called the Igreja Nossa Senhora de Guadalupe. Lopes's 87-year-old mother, Maria do Carmo do Nascimento, was in attendance. The service was organized by Rio's municipal union for journalists, the Sindicato dos Jornalistas do Município do Rio de Janeiro.

In January 2011, during the inauguration ceremony marking his reelection, Rio de Janeiro State Governor Sérgio Cabral mentioned Tim Lopes in his inaugural speech. Cabral stated that Tim Lopes's memory had been honored by Rio's government when the press room and a public high school were named after Lopes.

== Documentary films ==
Tim Lopes's son, Bruno Quintella (who was 19 when his father was killed), completed a university degree in journalism in 2010. In 2011 he began filming a biographical documentary film about the life of his father to show a broader perspective, not just the details of his death. In May 2012, 29-year-old Quintella visited Vila Cruzeiro, and also Pedro do Sapo in the Complexo do Alemão, the location of the clandestine cemetery that had held his father's remains. His visit coincided with the establishment of a permanent community police presence, as new UPPs were inaugurated in the area. The title of the film is "Histórias de Arcanjo: um documentário sobre Tim Lopes," (Stories of Archangel: a documentary about Tim Lopes); Arcanjo being Tim Lopes's first name.

In 2011 it was announced that Brazilian film director José Padilha, who is best known for his Elite Squad films (and who directed the remake of the 1987 urban sci-fi action film, RoboCop) is directing a documentary about the 2010 invasion of Vila Cruzeiro and the Complexo do Alemão by Rio's police and the Brazilian military. It's been reported that the documentary begins with an opening scene recounting the torture of Tim Lopes.

== Posthumous human rights award ==
Tim Lopes was posthumously awarded Brazil's top human rights prize, the Prêmio Direitos Humanos, on December 17, 2012, among other recipients. The award was presented by Brazilian President Dilma Rousseff to Lopes's sister Tânia Lopes at Itamaraty in Brasília. President Dilma expressed that the award honors "individuals fighters" who "risk their lives in defense of human rights."
