= Pholosong Hospital =

Geography
- Location: Tsakane, Ekurhuleni, Gauteng, South Africa
- Coordinates: 26°20.3725′S 28°22.5986′E

Organisation
- Type: General

Services
- Emergency department: Yes
- Beds: 300

Links
- Lists: Hospitals in South Africa

Pholosong Hospital is located in Tsakane, Gauteng, South Africa. The hospital serves a population of 900,000 from Tsakane, Kwa-Thema and Duduza.

== History ==
Construction of the hospital was completed in 1992 and the hospital first admitted patients that same year. The hospital celebrated its 20th anniversary in March 2012.

== Features and capacity ==
The hospital has 300 permanent beds and almost 1000 medical staff.

As of 2010, the hospital admitted approximately 20,000 patients annually. The hospital is responsible for approximately 5000 live births per year. In 2010, the hospital treated 118,399 trauma patients.

The hospital provides Paediatric, Obstetrics and Gynaecology services, HIV, TB and STI treatment and Antenatal care.

== See also ==
- Healthcare in South Africa
