= Igreja de Nossa Senhora da Penha =

Basilica Sanctuary of Our Lady of Penha de França
- Santuário Basílica de Nossa Senhora da Penha de França
- Igreja da Penha
- Santuário Basílica de Nossa Senhora da Penha de França
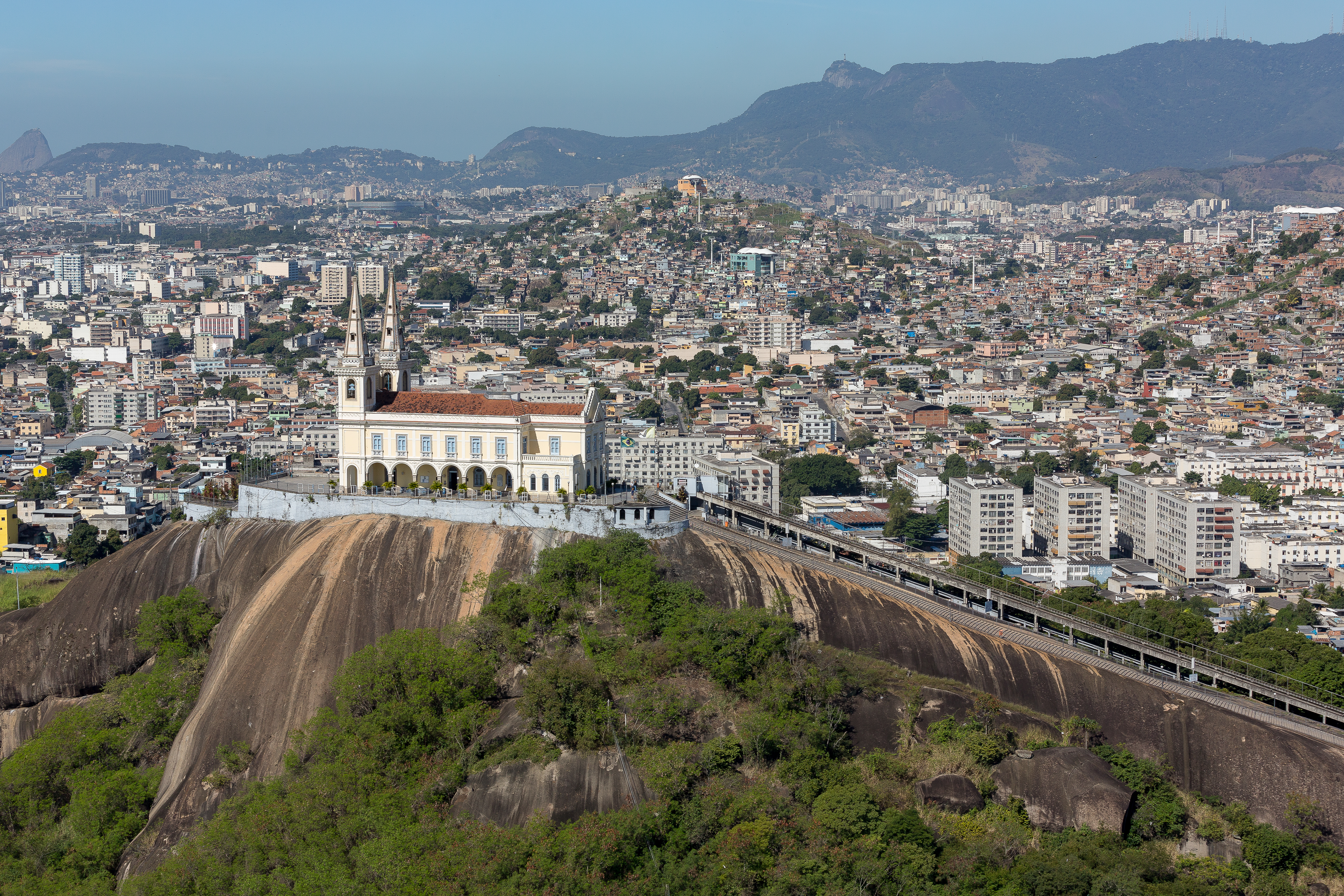
- Aerial view of the Basilica Sanctuary of Our Lady of Penha de França

- Location in Brazil
- 22.8425°S 43.2253°W
- Location: Penha, Rio de Janeiro, Rio de Janeiro
- Country: Brazil
- Language: Portuguese
- Denomination: Roman Catholic
- Tradition: Marian devotion
- Website: www.igrejadapenharj.org.br

History
- Status: Minor Basilica
- Founded: 1635
- Founder: Captain Baltazar
- Dedication: Our Lady of Peñafrancia
- Events: Annual Feast in October

Architecture
- Functional status: Active
- Architect: Luiz Moraes Júnior
- Architectural type: Basilica
- Style: Eclectic, Neo-Gothic
- Years built: 1635–1902
- Completed: 1902

Specifications
- Height: 111 m (364 ft)
- Materials: Granite, stone

Administration
- Archdiocese: Archdiocese of Rio de Janeiro

Clergy
- Archbishop: Dom Orani João Tempesta

The Basilica Sanctuary of Our Lady of Penha de França, popularly known as Igreja da Penha, is a traditional Catholic sanctuary located in the Penha neighborhood of Rio de Janeiro, Brazil.

Built on top of a rock, it is famous for the 382 steps of the main staircase, where many faithful fulfill their promises by climbing on foot or on their knees. The Basilica (or Sanctuary) also has three funicular railways to facilitate access for people who cannot climb the slope and staircase.

Every year in October, the sanctuary holds celebrations in honor of its patron saint, promoting hourly masses on Sundays, religious concerts, illuminated processions, outdoor masses, performances by folk groups and choirs, and a festival on the slope leading up to the sanctuary with traditional food stalls, a variety of sweets, and background music.

The basilica has an inclined plane, popularly known as a "bondinho", to provide access for worshippers. It operates daily, is maintained by the city government, and is free to use.

== History ==
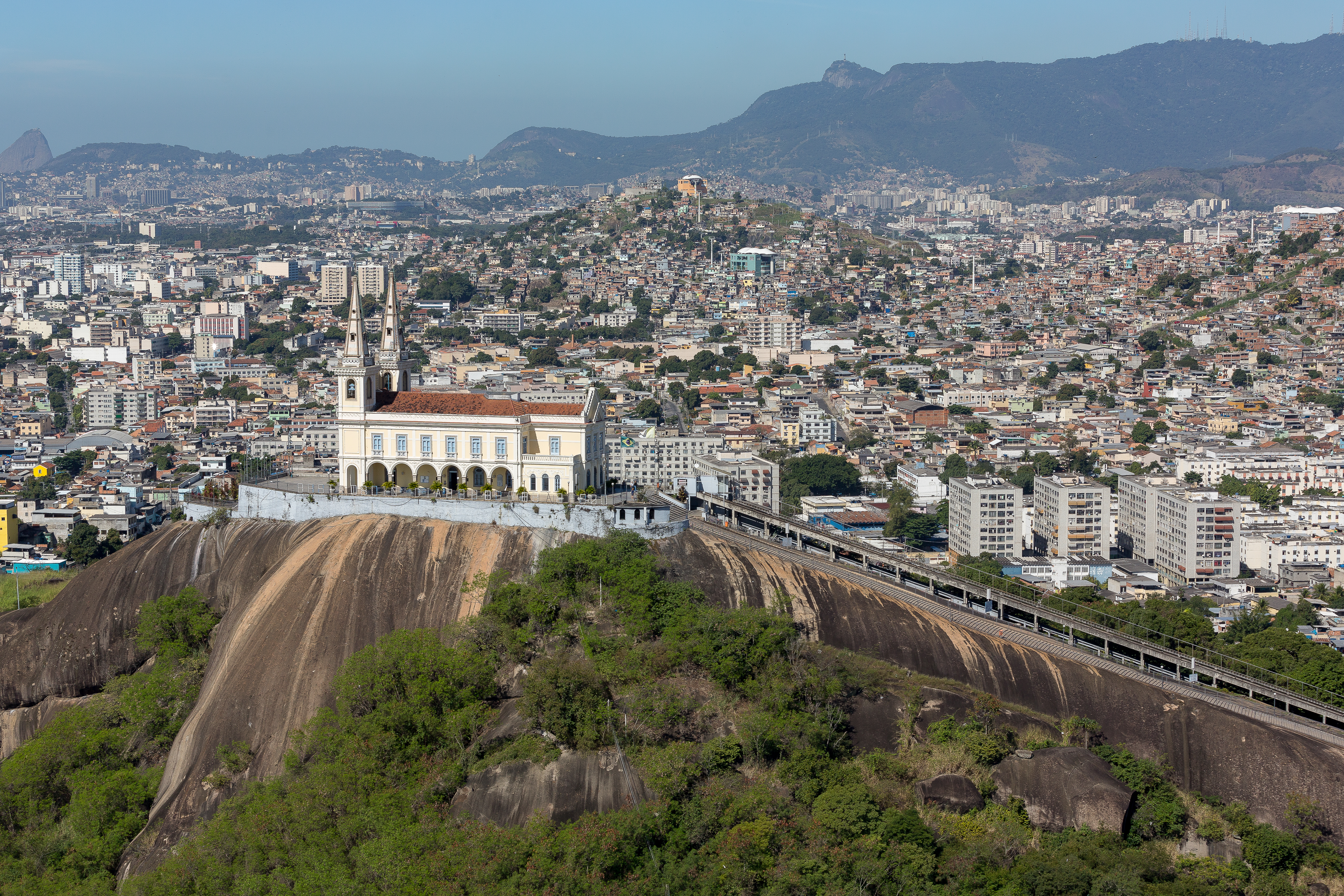
Aerial view of Igreja da Penha

The Nossa Senhora da Penha Church, with its eclectic Brazilian architecture, is located in the northern part of Rio de Janeiro, in the Penha neighborhood. Belonging to the Penha Sanctuary, the church is the object of great devotion among Catholics, attracting large crowds throughout the year, especially in October, when the festivities take place. The Sanctuary has existed for over 380 years and can be accessed by the staircase that made the church famous: it is 111 meters high and has 382 steps, which are often used by the faithful to fulfill their promises.

The history of the chapel began with the owner of the Sesmaria estate, Captain Baltazar, in 1635, in gratitude to Our Lady for saving him from an accident that could have been fatal. The captain, wanting to see his lands from the top of the rock, was attacked by a snake and, when he asked for the protection of the Saint, she sent a lizard, the enemy of snakes, freeing him from the accident. In gratitude, he had a small chapel built on top of the rock, which grew and developed into the current church.

The staircase would come later, more precisely in 1819. In 1817, a very pious couple asked the saint to give them a child, since they had been married for a long time and still had no children. The wife, Mrs. Maria Barbosa, trusted, asked, and promised to carve a staircase into the hard granite of the cliff to make access to the church easier. The following year, 1818, the son arrived, and finally the staircase was ready in 1819. In total, the staircase consists of 382 steps carved into the stone.

The view from the church is breathtaking and privileged, offering views of Christ the Redeemer, Corcovado, Guanabara Bay, part of Teresópolis, and Galeão International Airport. On June 16, 2016, Pope Francis, responding to requests from the Cardinal Archbishop of Rio de Janeiro, Dom Orani João Tempesta, elevated the Archdiocesan Marian Shrine of Our Lady of Penha to the status of Minor Basilica.

== Architecture ==
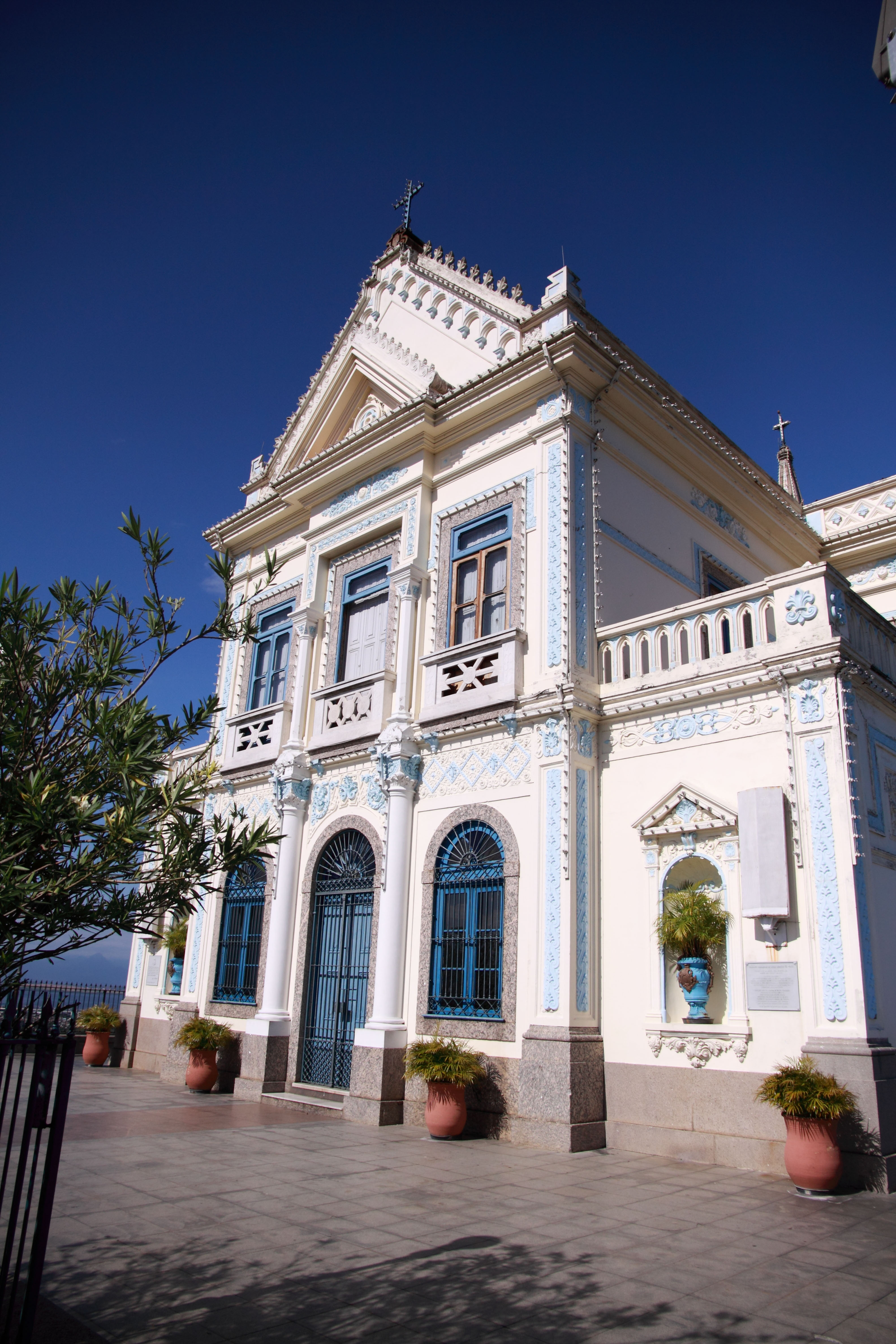
Penha Church seen from the exit of the Inclined Plane

As the church grew out of a small chapel and was developed and renovated over time, many characterize it as belonging to the Eclectic style. Its current appearance is due to the last renovation, which was inspired by the Neo-Gothic architectural style. In 1900, engineer and architect Luiz Moraes Júnior, born in Portugal, migrated to Brazil and, at the invitation of Father Ricardo, who was vicar general of the church, settled in Rio de Janeiro, where he devoted himself to restoring the church's façade, which was completed in 1902.

Its current form has several architectural influences, given its eclectic style, which can be seen in formal characteristics such as:

- Symmetry: its main façade has two towers flanking the central body;
- Balustrade railing on its rear façade, which is accessed by staircases;
- Base, body, and crown, a characteristic remnant of the neoclassical style;
- Tall, pointed towers, characteristic of the neo-Gothic style;
- Pediment with a purely decorative function, typical of 17th-century religious architecture and mining regions;
- Verandas on the sides;
- Interior decoration in light blue and gold.

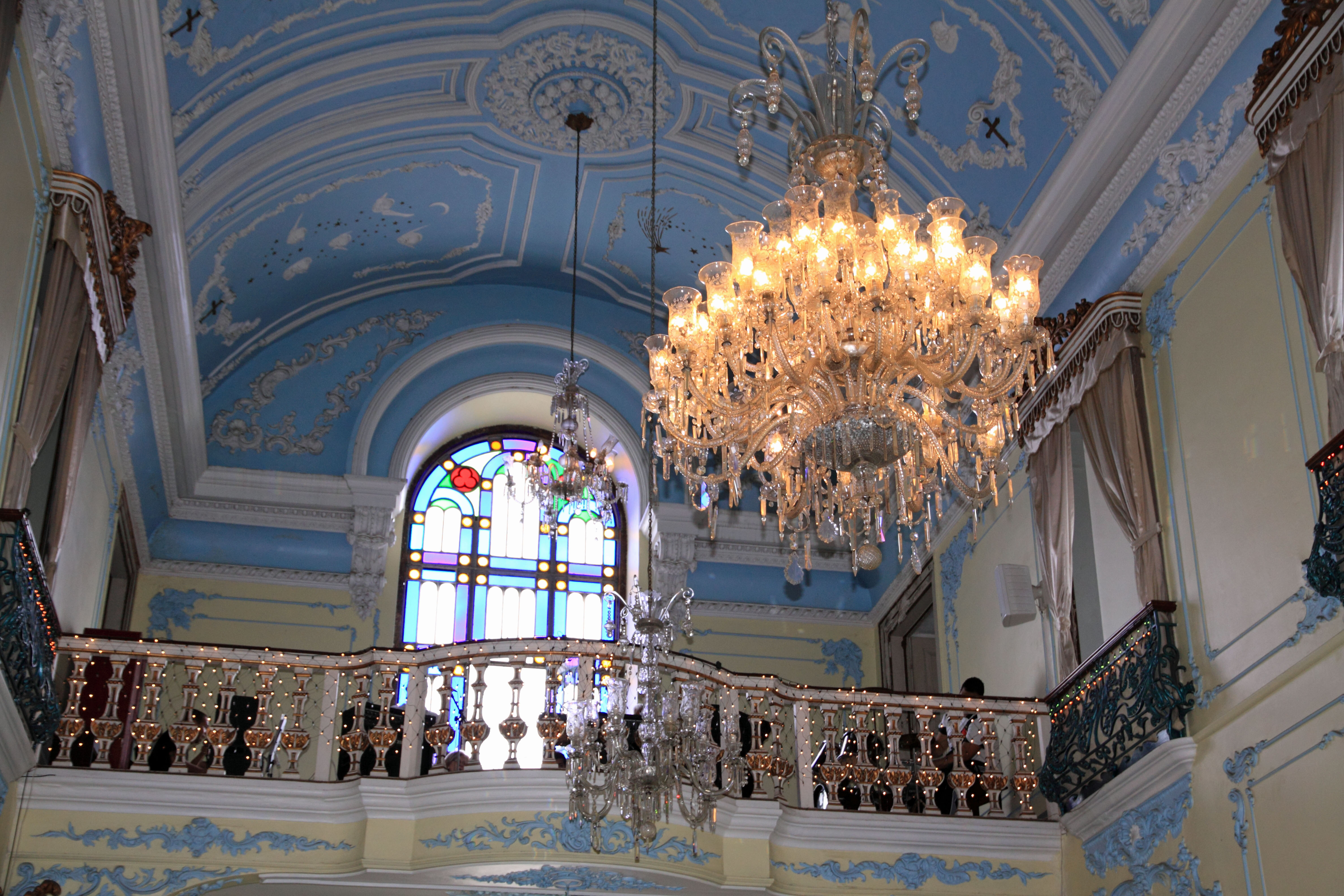
Choir Location

== Listing ==
During the administration of the then mayor of Rio de Janeiro, Saturnino Braga (PSB), the church began the process of being listed as a historic landmark by the Rio World Heritage Institute. In 1990, during Marcello Alencar's (PSDB) term in office, the listing process was completed through Decree No. 9,413.

== See also ==
- Our Lady of Peñafrancia
