= Tsakane =

Tsakane Mashona
- Tsakani
- Location within Gauteng Location within South Africa
- Coordinates: 26°21′S 28°22′E
- Country: South Africa
- Province: Gauteng
- Municipality: Ekurhuleni

Area
  - Total: 19.75 km^{2} (7.63 sq mi)

Population (2011)
  - Total: 135,994
  - Density: 6,886/km^{2} (17,830/sq mi)

Racial makeup (2011)
  - Black African: 98.8%
  - Coloured: 0.4%
  - Indian/Asian: 0.2%
  - White: 0.2%
  - Other: 0.5%

First languages (2011)
  - Zulu: 57.9%
  - Sotho: 10.1%
  - Northern Sotho: 18.0%
- Time zone: UTC+2 (SAST)
- Postal code (street): 1550
- PO box: 1548
- Area code: 738

Tsakani, formally known as Tsakane, is a township located in Ekurhuleni, Gauteng, South Africa. It was established during the early 1960s due to Apartheid's segregationist policies and was formally founded as a designated area. Tsakani is a Tsonga word which means joy and this township is associated with the adjacent townships of KwaThema and Duduza, being collectively called Kwatsaduza in Ekurhuleni.

During the 2011 Census the population of Tsakane consisted of Black Africans (134,342), Coloureds (539), Whites (28), Indian/Asians (216) - 135,994 in total. The languages that are spoken are as follows: IsiZulu, Sotho, Xhosa, Setswana, Xitsonga, Ndebele and English. Tsakani is divided into different extensions: 1, 11, 12, 13, 14, 15, 16, 17, 18, 19, 5, 8, 9 and 22.

== Health Services ==
Tsakane has one public hospital called Pholosong. The hospital serves a population of 900,000 people from Tsakane, KwaThema and Duduza. There is one public clinic and other smaller surgeries and clinics in the township that take care of the health of the people around the township of Tsakane. Clinics help patients with health issues such as high blood pressure, cancer, HIV/AIDS blood tests and treatment, etc.

== Economic Development ==
Economic development in Tsakane is centred in the area around the mall which also accommodates the police station, the Magistrates court, the stadium and the Municipal offices. There are 4 Shoprite stores in Tsakane and the malls and shopping complexes are forever busy throughout the week especially around the end of the month. There is a range of housing in Tsakane. Residences range from middle-class houses (Ext 1,5,8 & 11) normal houses (central) to RDP houses (Mandela village, Ext 9,12,13,15 & 19).

== Lifestyle ==
Tsakane has two shopping centers, Tsakane Corner and The Square, and other smaller shopping centers which are located in different sections of the township: Duduza Rank, Extension 11 and Extension 19. Tsakane mall is not very big but has many stores and banks. There are two well known supermarkets in the mall that most people buy food from and there are two other shopping centers: Extension 11 and Extension 19. There are fast-food restaurants, clubs and other places that people go to on special occasions, such as on public holidays. Tsakane also boasts an active night life with several bars. The people of Tsakane like to eat out and support their local township food businesses which sell bunny chow or "kota" as it is referred to.

== Sports and Leisure ==
Tsakane has one major stadium, Tsakane Stadium. The stadium is not large enough to host matches between big soccer teams like Orlando Pirates and Kaizer Chiefs. Although lately the stadium has hosted some matches between the reserve teams of these big clubs in a tournament called the Diski Challenge. In addition to soccer games, the stadium is also often used for local activities such as government functions, school sports days, music festivals and religious gatherings.Tsakane holds a Local football Association (LFA) League in a gravel sports ground called Malandela sports ground near Tsakane Stadium.

== Education ==
List of Schools in Tsakane
List of Primary Schools	List of Secondary Schools
Funukukhanya Primary School	African School For Excellence (ASE)
Khombindlela Primary School	Buhlebemfundo Secondary School
Lebone Primary School	J.E Malepe Secondary Secondary
Letsie Primary School	Tholulwazi Secondary School
Mandlethu Primary School	Tsakane Secondary School
Mangosuthu Primary School	Mamellong Secondary School
Michael Zulu Primary School	Reshogofaditswe Secondary School
Nchabeleng Primary School
Phumlani Primary School
Shadrack Mbambo Primary School
Thuthukanisizwe Primary School
Tsakane Primary School
Vuyani Primary School

Michael Mkwanazi Primary School Sizuzile Primary School

=== The African School for Excellence ===
The African School for Excellence (ASE) is currently the only private school located in Tsakane. The ASE model was designed specifically to address the needs and challenges of township secondary school scholars. The main difference between it and government public schools in Tsakane is that ASE uses the Cambridge curriculum.

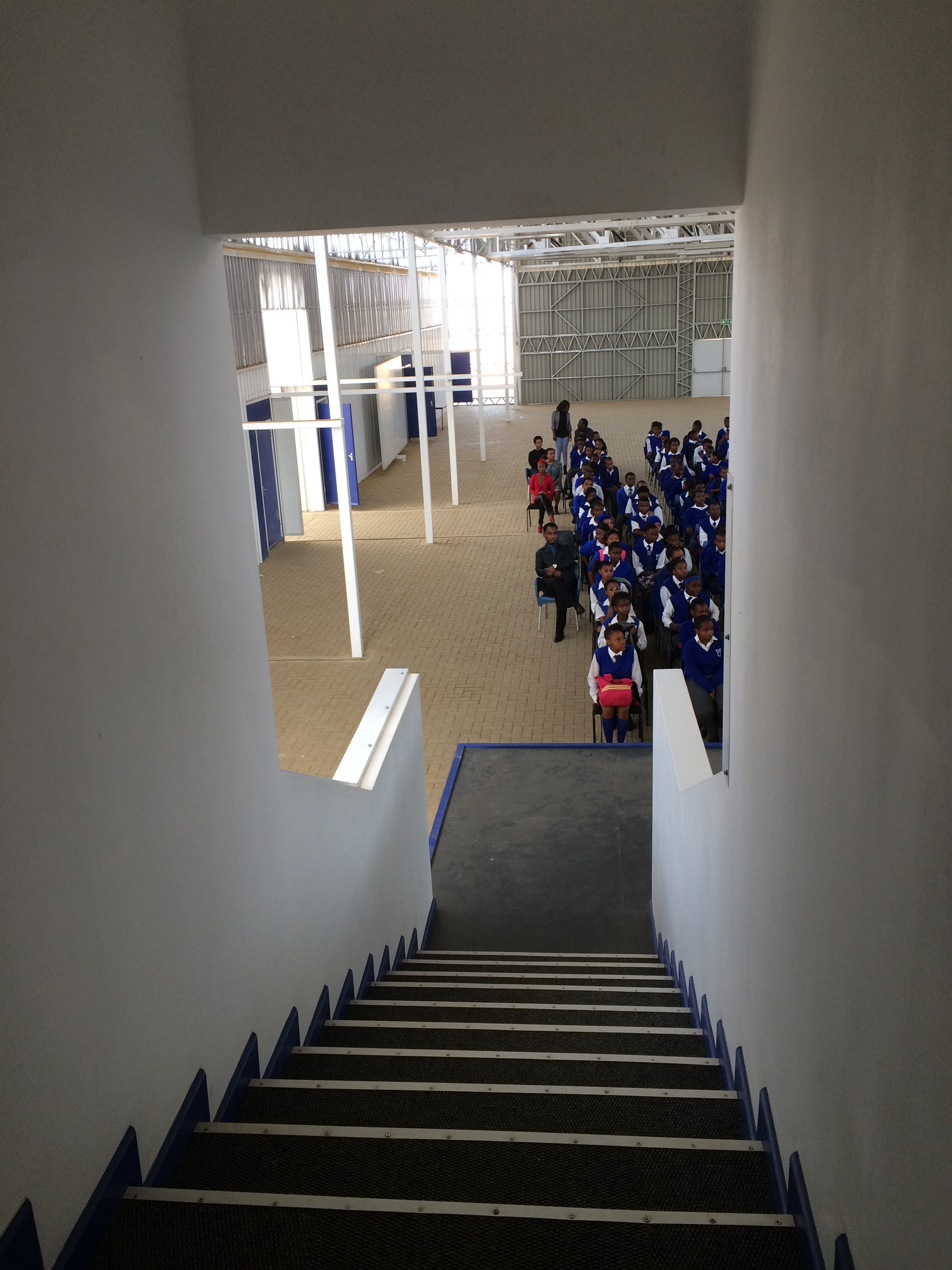

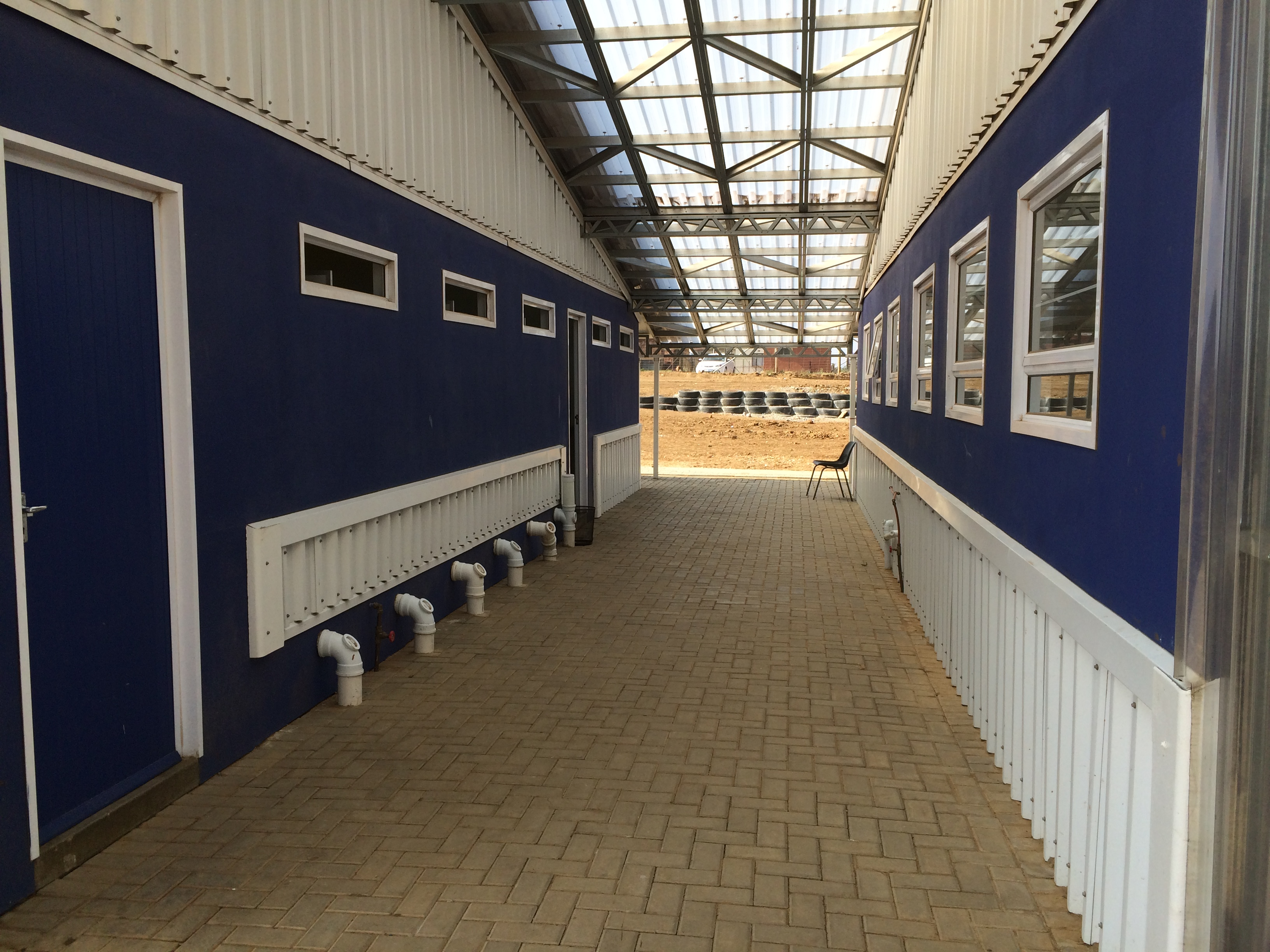

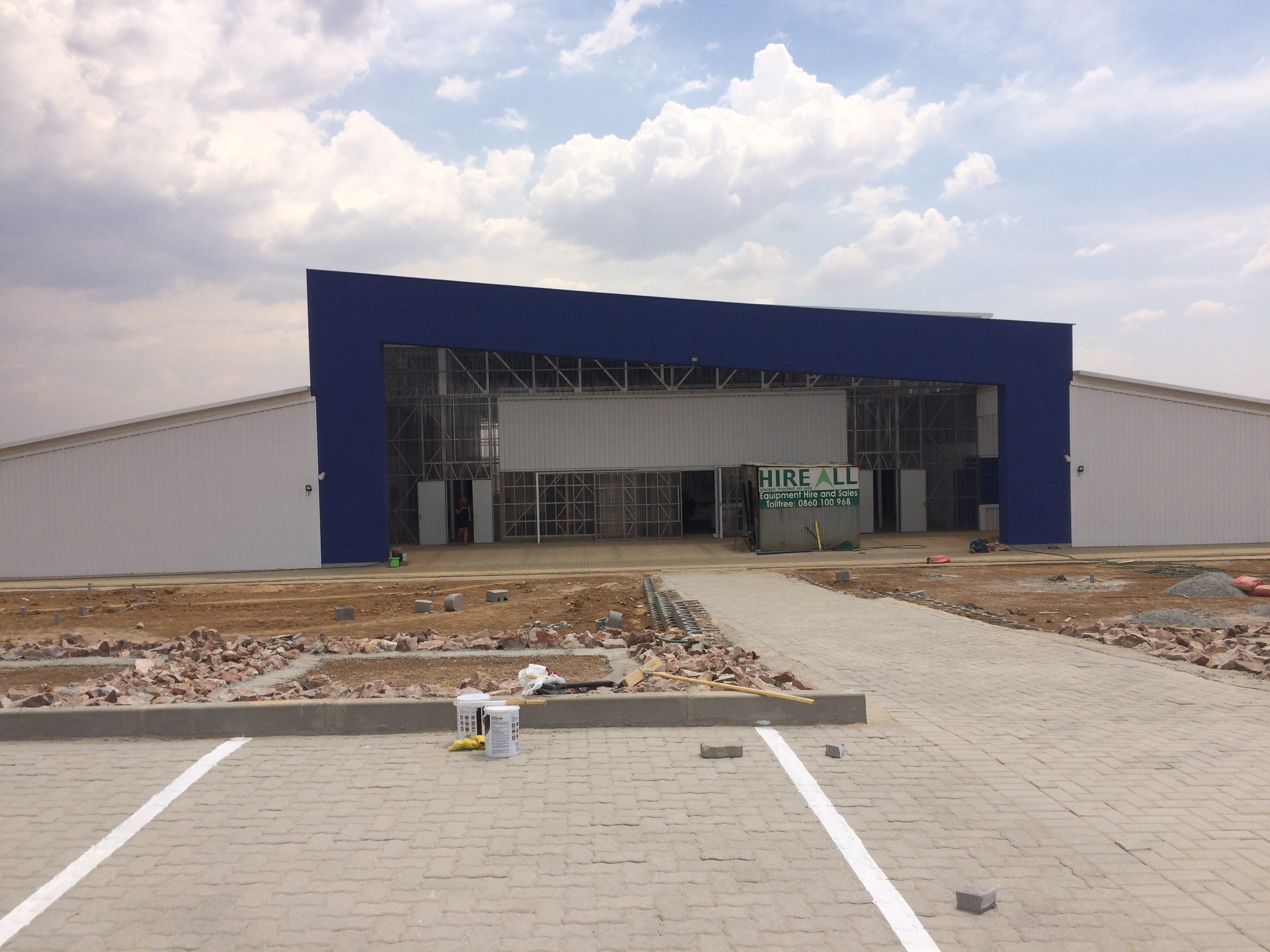

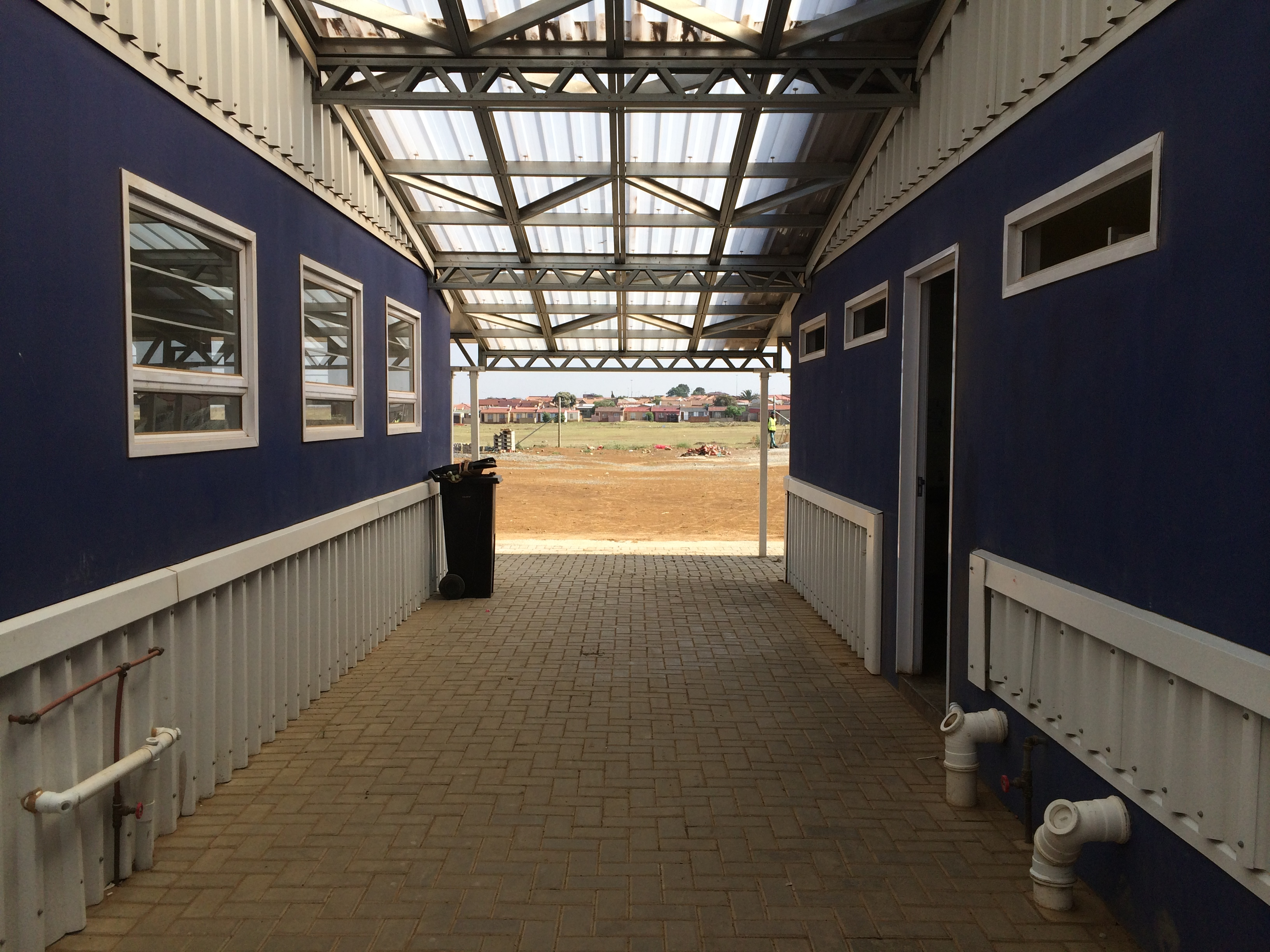

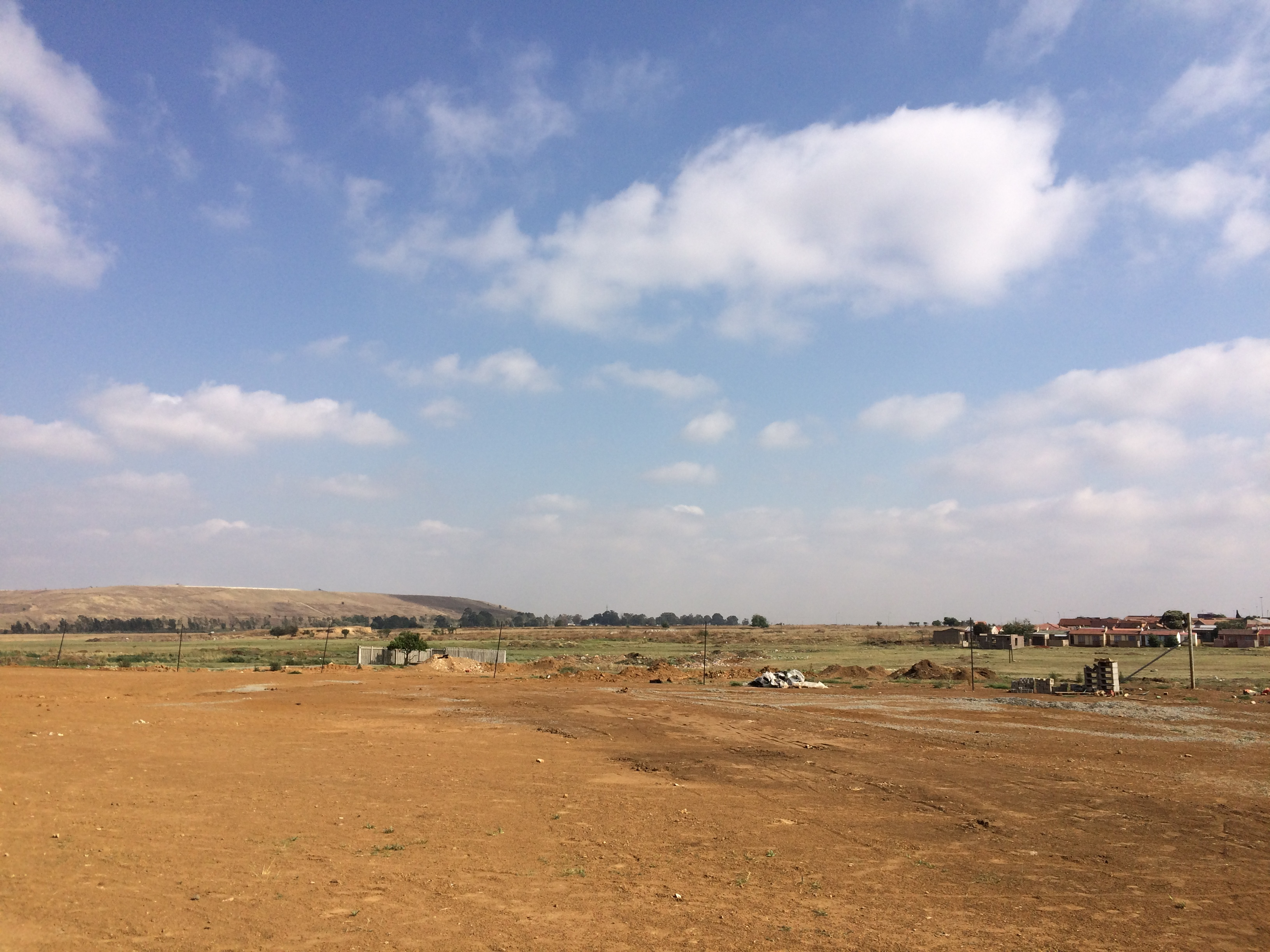

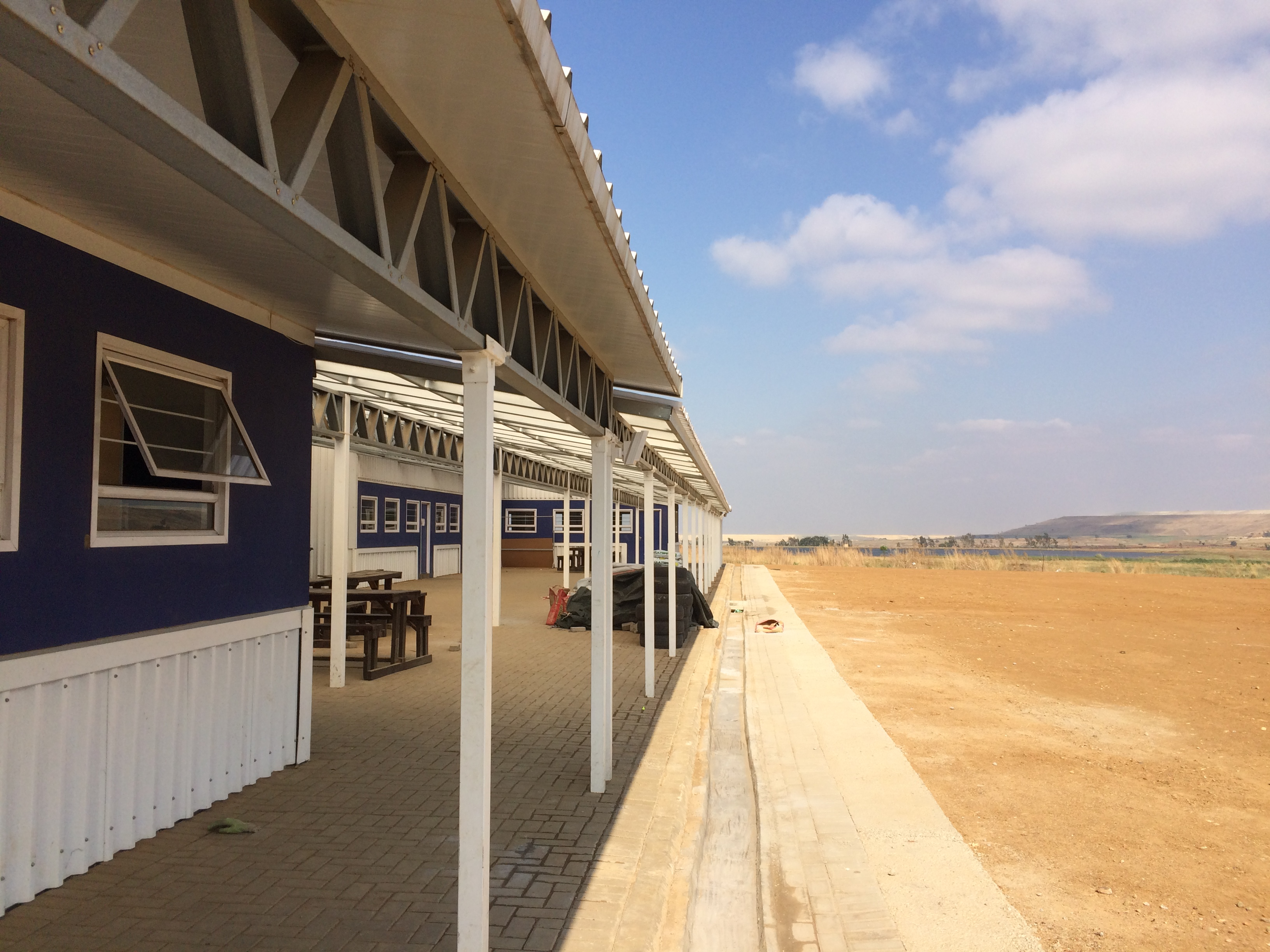

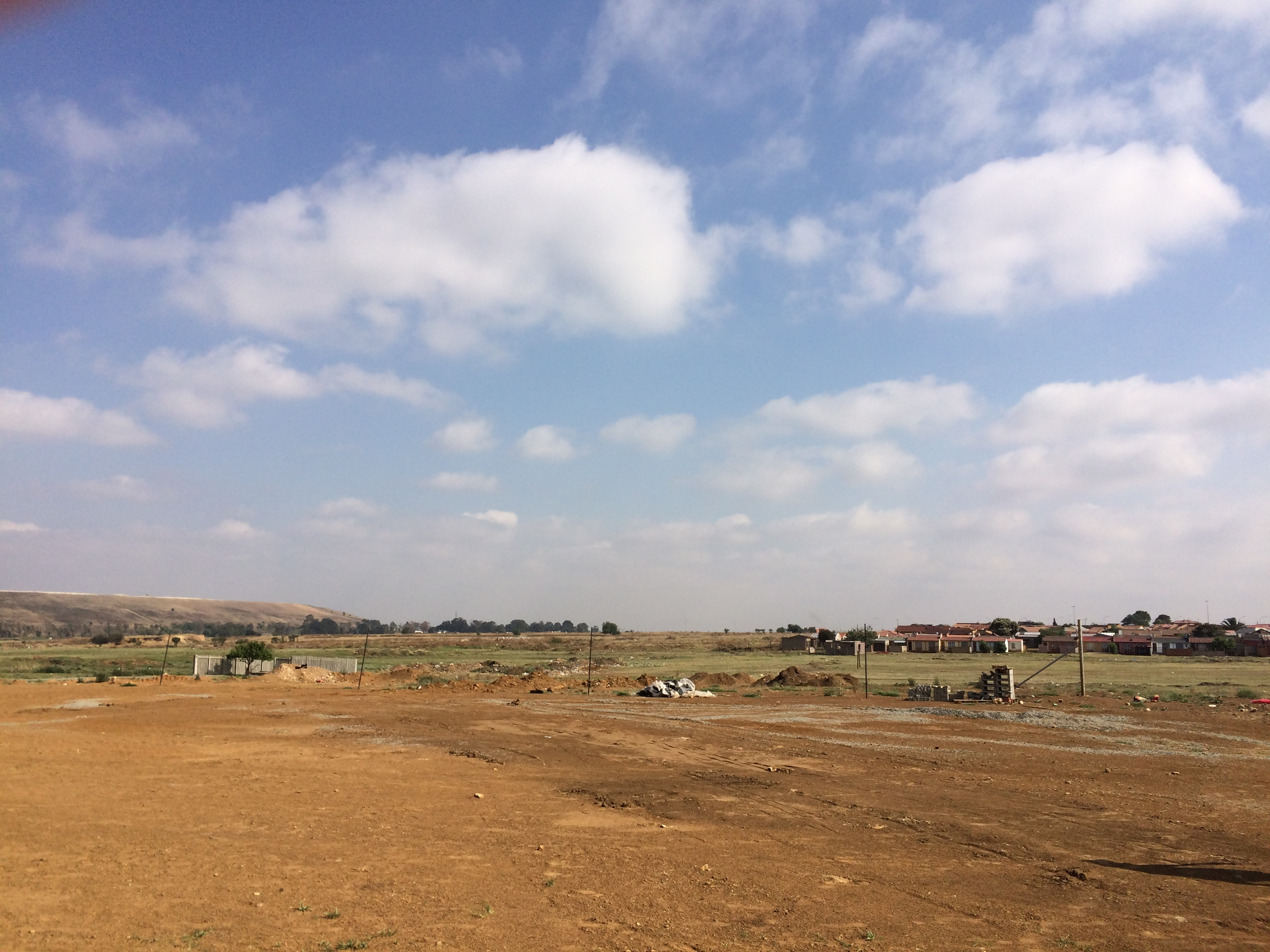

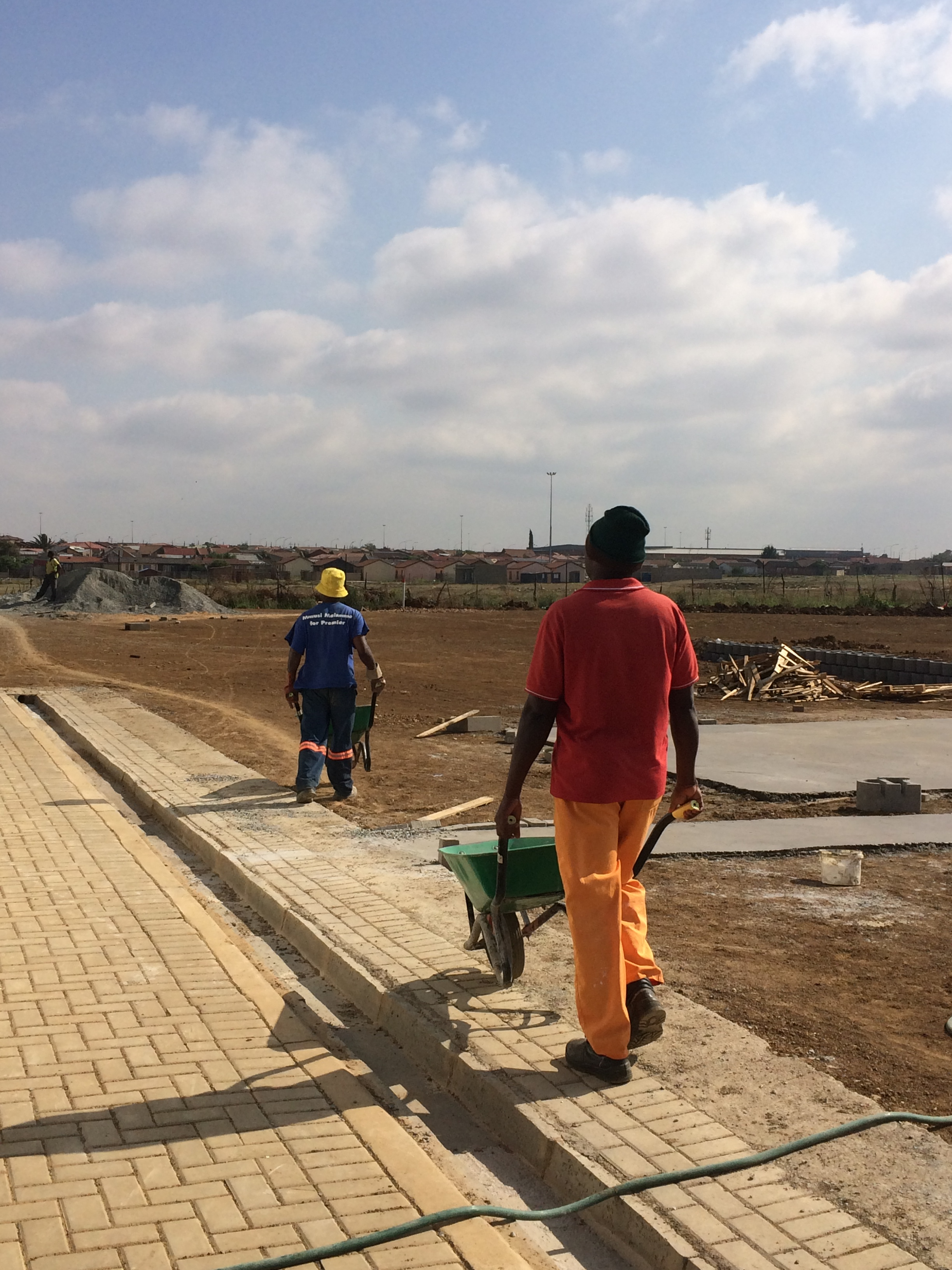

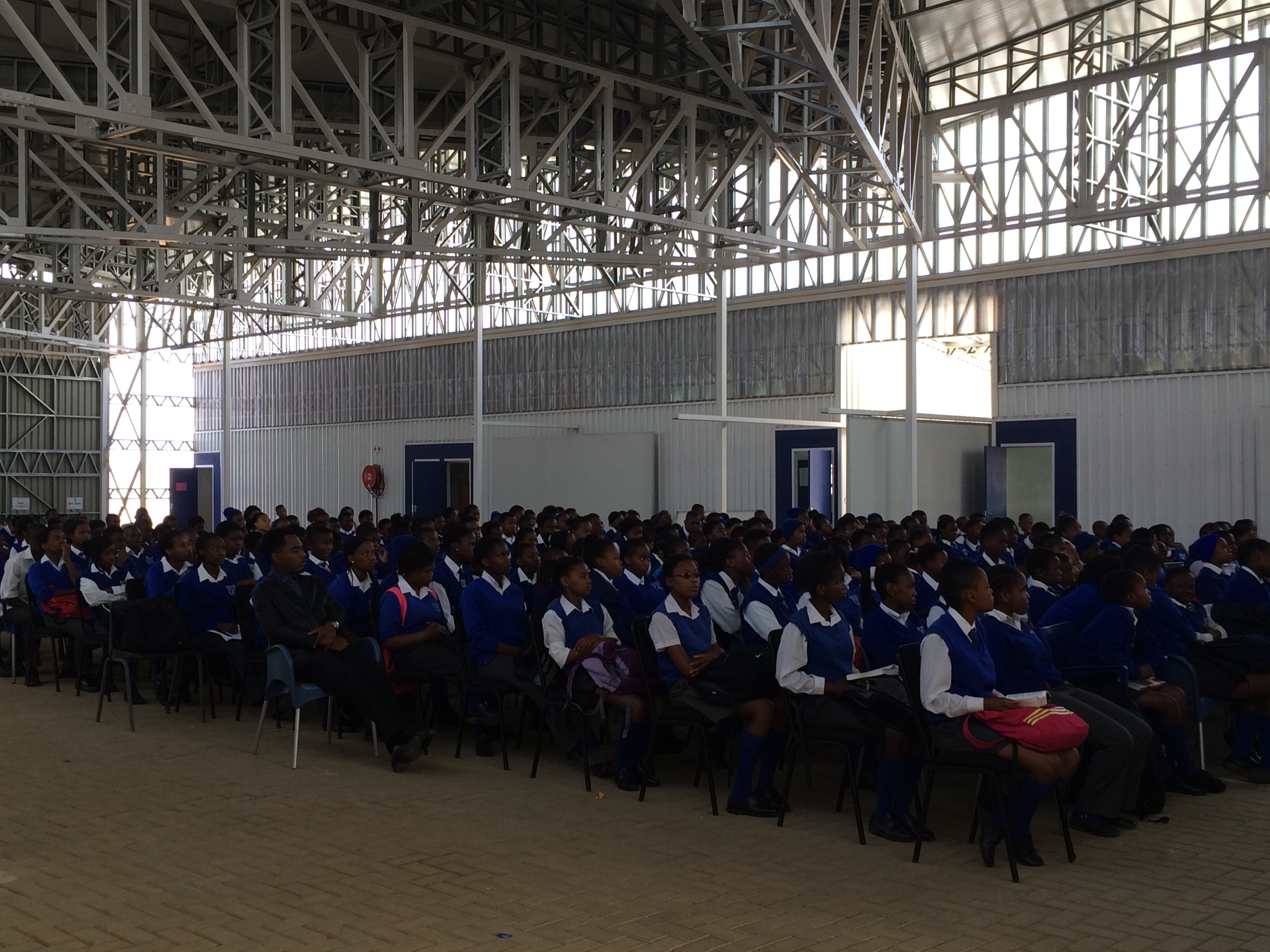

== Communication, Arts and Culture ==
=== Radio Station ===
Tsakane has one community radio station called EK FM 103.6. The radio station serves as a community development and communication media for Tsakane, Kwathema, Duduza and Daveyton communities.

=== Newspaper ===
Tsakane has a local newspaper: The African Reporter. The African Reporter is a weekly newspaper distributed on Fridays across the East Rand with an estimated circulation of 22,000 newspapers.
