= Moses Mahlangu =

Moses Mahlangu (4 January 1925 - 25 June 2001) was a long-time supporter of the teachings of the Church of Jesus Christ of Latter-day Saints (LDS Church) in South Africa. Mahlangu first found a copy of the Book of Mormon sometime in the 1960s. At the time, he was a Christian preacher in South African townships.

Some accounts state that the first copy of the Book of Mormon he found had a torn title page, so it was a few years before he learned who had published it. He was fascinated as he read it and invited others to study it with him. Sometime around 1968 Mahlangu's friend Piet Mafora saw an LDS Church building while driving a delivery truck in Johannesburg, South Africa. Mafora told Mahlangu, who went to see the building himself. The building was locked when he first arrived but he was given contact information for the mission president on his second visit. When Mahlangu went to the mission home, the missionaries met with him. It was not until he had been coming to the mission home for three weeks that mission president Howard C. Badger gave missionaries permission to teach the gospel to Mahlangu. Later Badger himself was involved in teaching. Despite this Badger decided the current situation in South Africa meant that Mahlangu's baptism should be delayed.

Moses Mahlangu accepted that decision with meekness, humility, and without resentment, but he continued to have a strong desire to learn more about the church. A frequently-told story states that church members would leave meetinghouse windows open during the Sunday meetings so Mahlangu and his friends could sit outside and listen to the services. Recent scholarship has shown that story is most likely incorrect.

In 1978, LDS Church President Spencer W. Kimball received a revelation extending the priesthood to all worthy male church members. Kimball personally visited South Africa, where the church's only mission on the continent was headquartered, and directed that missionary work be cautiously expanded to include black Africans as well. In 1980, Mahlangu and his family were baptized and he was ordained to the priesthood. Mahlungu was made a counselor in the elder's quorum presidency when the branch was organized. Also baptized at the same time were several black people he had introduced to the church since he first found the Book of Mormon. The next year, in 1981, the church organized a branch in Mahlangu's neighborhood in Soweto. This was possible only because of the determination, courage, and faithfulness of people like Moses Mahlangu who remained faithful for so many years under difficult circumstances.
