= Howard C. Badger =

American politician (1914–1989)

Member of the Utah House of Representatives
- In office 1942–1944

Personal details
- Born: December 29, 1914 Salt Lake City, Utah, U.S.
- Died: February 24, 1989 (aged 74) Salt Lake City, Utah, U.S.
- Party: Republican
- Spouse: Eleanor Jeremy Ashton
- Children: 5
- Occupation: Real estate developer

Howard C. Badger (1914–1989) was a Republican member of the Utah House of Representatives from 1942 to 1944. He also served as president of the South African Mission of The Church of Jesus Christ of Latter-day Saints.

Badger was a real estate developer. He was involved with developments in Bountiful, Utah.

As a young man in the mid-1930s Badger served a mission for the Church in South Africa.

In 1939 he married Eleanor Jeremy Ashton, daughter of prominent leader in The Church of Jesus Christ of Latter-day Saints Marvin O. Ashton and sister of future apostle Marvin J. Ashton. Together they became the parents of five children.

He was president of the South African mission from 1967 to 1970. He also was a regional representative of the 12.

== Bibliography ==
- 1989 Deseret News obituary
