= Penha, Rio de Janeiro =

Penha
- Neighborhood
- Location in Rio de Janeiro Penha (Brazil)
- Coordinates: 22°50′13″S 43°16′40″W
- Country: Brazil
- State: Rio de Janeiro (RJ)
- Municipality/City: Rio de Janeiro
- Zone: North Zone

Population (2010)
  - Total: 78,678

Penha is a low middle-class neighborhood in the North Zone of Rio de Janeiro, Brazil.

== Religion ==
- Igreja de Nossa Senhora da Penha, catholic church.
