= Minister of Police v Skosana =

South African legal case

Minister of Police v Skosana is an important case in South African law. It was heard in the Appellate Division on 19 March 1976, with judgment handed down on 27 September. The judges were Wessels JA, Jansen JA, Corbett JA, Kotzé JA and Viljoen AJA.

The case is especially important in the law of delict, dealing with the problems relating to causation and the conditio sine qua non or "but-for" test. Where there was a negligent delay in furnishing medical aid and treatment to the deceased, whose widow established, on a balance of probabilities, that he would not have died "but for" such delay, the court held that she was entitled to damages.

== Facts ==
In the Transvaal Provincial Division, Skosana had successfully claimed damages on behalf of herself and her minor children resulting from the death of her husband, "T," in the following circumstances. T, whilst heavily under the influence of intoxicating liquor, had driven his motor car off the road and landed in a ditch, as a result whereof he, together with Skosana and two other passengers, had been injured. The passengers had been removed in an ambulance, but "T" had been removed in a police van to the charge office and from there to the consulting rooms of the district surgeon, who had performed a clinical examination and taken a blood sample. At that stage, "T" had only complained of a pain in the chest. Although he had been examined thoroughly, no sign of internal injury could be detected.

When the cells were opened next morning, at 7.45 am, he complained of quite a severe pain over the abdomen and requested to be taken to a doctor. At 9.45 am, he walked with the constable to the district surgeon's consulting rooms where he was immediately examined. The district surgeon wrote a note for the hospital and instructed the constable to arrange for his being taken there. There was a further delay of two hours before the ambulance arrived.

At the hospital, "T" was found to be in a very serious condition. An attempt was made to resuscitate him for operation, but his condition remained poor. When it was found impossible to resuscitate him further, a laparotomy was performed. The viscus was found to be ruptured with severe generalised peritonitis. The ruptured small bowel was sutured and a drain inserted. Although he had only been lightly anaesthetized, he failed to "wake up" and died shortly after leaving the theatre.

== Principles ==
Causation in the law of delict gives rise to two distinct problems. The first is a factual one, relating to the question of whether or not the negligent act or omission in question caused or materially contributed to the harm which gave rise to the claim. If it did not, no legal liability can arise and cadit quaestio; if it did, the second problem becomes relevant: whether the negligent act or omission is linked to the harm sufficiently closely or directly for legal liability to ensue, or whether, as it is said, the harm is too remote.

This is basically a juridical problem in which considerations of legal policy may play a part. The test, otherwise known as that of causa (conditio) sine qua non, is whether or not, but for the negligent act or omission of the defendant, the event giving rise to the harm would have occurred. Generally speaking, the Appellate Division found, no act or condition or omission may be regarded as a cause in fact unless it passes this test.

== Judgment ==
The court a quo held that the constables concerned, acting within the course of their duty and within the score of their employment, had been negligent

- in not immediately summoning the district surgeon; and
- in not causing him to be taken to hospital immediately thereafter.

The court awarded damages in an agreed amount.

In an appeal, it was accepted that the prime cause of death was the occurrence in which "T" sustained his bowel injury, which in turn resulted in peritonitis. The Appellate Division held that Skosana, the respondent, had established negligent delay in furnishing the deceased with medical aid and treatment in the aforesaid respects, and held further that the respondent had established, as a matter of probability, that the deceased would have survived if the operation had been performed nearly five hours earlier, as it would have been, regard being had to a shorter period of resuscitation being necessary, but for the negligence of the constables. (Jansen JA and Viljoen AJA dissented here.) The decision in the Transvaal Provincial Division, in Skosana v Minister of Police, was thus confirmed.

== See also ==
- Delict
- Law of South Africa
- South African law of delict
