= Necklacing =

Type of summary execution and torture

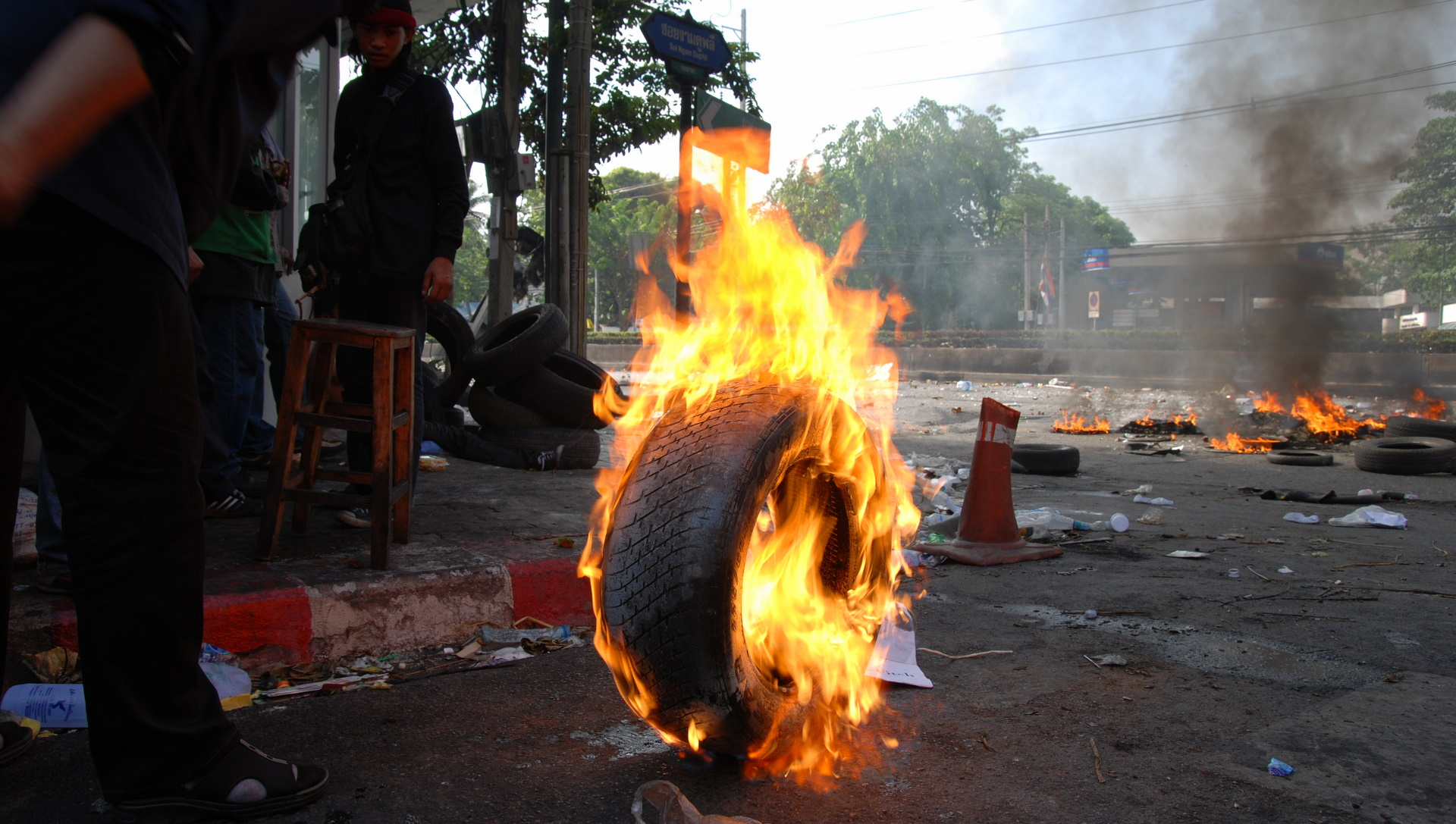

Necklacing is a method of extrajudicial summary execution and torture carried out by forcing a rubber tyre drenched with petrol around a victim's chest and arms, and setting it on fire. The term "necklace" originated in the mid-to-late 1980s, in the black townships of apartheid-era South Africa, where suspected apartheid collaborators were publicly executed in this fashion by anti-apartheid activists.

== South Africa ==
Necklacing was used by the black community to punish its members who were perceived as collaborators with the National Party-led government. Necklacing was primarily used on black police informants by the anti-apartheid activists; the practice was often carried out in the name of the struggle, although the executive body of the African National Congress (ANC), the most broadly supported South African opposition movement, condemned it. In 1986, Winnie Mandela, then-wife of the imprisoned Nelson Mandela, and who herself had endured torture and four imprisonments to a total of two years, stated, "With our boxes of matches, and our necklaces, we shall liberate this country," which was widely seen as an explicit endorsement of necklacing. This caused the ANC to initially distance itself from her, although she later took on a number of official positions within the party.

The first victim of necklacing, according to the South African Truth and Reconciliation Commission, was a young black woman, Maki Skosana of Duduza, on 20 July 1985:

Moloko said her sister was burned to death with a tyre around her neck while attending the funeral of one of the youths. Her body had been scorched by fire and some broken pieces of glass had been inserted into her vagina, Moloko told the committee. Moloko added that a big rock had been thrown on her face after she had been killed.

However, according to Ball, the first widely reported instance of necklacing was the killing of Thamsanqa Benjamin Kinikini from KwaNobuhle, Eastern Cape, on 23 March 1985. Kinikini, a member of the local town council, was allegedly involved in corruption and violence, and had refused to resign from his position, unlike some of his colleagues. He was also accused of participating in the abduction of United Democratic Front (UDF) youths. Five of his sons and nephews were killed alongside him. The incident received significant media coverage, including footage by Dutch television showing a crowd chanting and dancing around his burning body. This publicity may have contributed to the escalation of the practice in the following period.

Photojournalist Kevin Carter was the first to photograph a public execution by necklacing in South Africa in the mid-1980s. He later spoke of the images:

I was appalled at what they were doing. I was appalled at what I was doing. But then people started talking about those pictures ... then I felt that maybe my actions hadn't been at all bad. Being a witness to something this horrible wasn't necessarily such a bad thing to do.

Author Lynda Schuster writes:

'Necklacing' represented the worst of the excesses committed in the name of the uprising. This was a particularly gruesome form of mob justice, reserved for those thought to be government collaborators, informers and black policemen. The executioners would force a car tyre over the head and around the arms of the suspect, drench it in petrol, and set it alight. Immobilised, the victim burned to death.

Some commentators have noted that the practice of necklacing served to escalate the levels of violence during the township wars of the 1980s and early 1990s as security force members became brutalised and afraid that they might fall victim to the practice.

== Other countries ==
=== Haiti ===
This form of lynching was used in Haiti, where it was known as Pé Lebrun, or Père Lebrun (French), after a tire advertisement showing a man with a tyre around his neck. It was used prominently by mobs allied with Jean-Bertrand Aristide to assassinate political enemies. Aristide himself allegedly showed strong support for this practice, calling it a "beautiful tool" that "smells good", encouraging his Lavalas supporters to use it against wealthy people as well as members of the Lavalas party who were not as strong in their fervour. Others argue he was actually speaking about people using the constitution to empower themselves and to defend their country against right-wing death squads. Earlier in the speech he is quoted as saying "Your tool in hand, your instrument in hand, your constitution in hand! Don't hesitate to give him what he deserves. Your equipment in hand, your trowel in hand, your pencil in hand, your Constitution in hand, don't hesitate to give him what he deserves".

=== Sri Lanka and India ===
During the 1983 Black July riot against Sri Lankan Tamils, Sinhalese rioters used necklacing. Necklacing was also widely used against Sinhalese youth by government supported paramilitary forces in the second armed insurrection (1989–1991) led by the Janatha Vimukthi Peramuna. A graphic description of one such necklacing appears in the book The Island of Blood by journalist Anita Pratap.

This technique was widely used against Sikhs during the 1984 anti-Sikh riots, which took place throughout northern India after the erstwhile Indian prime minister Indira Gandhi, having presided over Operation Blue Star earlier that year, was assassinated by her Sikh bodyguards.

=== Ivory Coast ===
In the early 1990s, university students in Abidjan, Ivory Coast, were plagued by burglars stealing from their dormitories. The students took matters into their own hands by capturing the alleged thieves, and then executed them by placing tyres around their necks and setting the tyres on fire. Ivorian police, powerless to stop these necklacings, could do nothing but stand by and watch.

=== Nigeria ===
Necklacing is a common outcome of jungle justice in Nigeria. In 2006, at least one person died in Nigeria by necklacing in the deadly protests which followed the publication of cartoons in Jyllands-Posten depicting Muhammad. In November 2012, four students of the University of Port Harcourt were falsely accused of being thieves and fatally necklaced by a mob. In November 2016, a seven-year-old boy died after being necklaced for allegedly attempting to steal garri from a shop. In March 2025, 16 people suspected of kidnapping were killed by a mob near Uromi, at least some of them by necklacing.

=== Brazil ===
A form of necklacing where victims are forced inside a stack of tyres doused with petrol and set on fire is widely used by drug dealers in Brazil, notably in Rio de Janeiro, where it is called micro-ondas (lit. 'microwave'). One notable victim was journalist Tim Lopes, who, while trying to do a journalistic investigation, was kidnapped, tortured and eventually placed within several tires, covered in diesel fuel, and set on fire.

=== Cambodia ===
During the Cambodian genocide, blunt weapons and farming tools were used for usual executions. However, one witness named Cheam Soeu testified that a form of necklacing in which a tire would be placed on the victim and the victim would be burned alive was reserved to execute Westerners. This method of execution would usually take multiple tires so the whole body would be burned in a designated time. However, in one instance, only one tire was tied around a foreigner who was ordered to sit. It was slowly burnt until the next shift and his dead body was not touched by anyone for a while. Kang Kek Iew confirmed that these executions happened on his watch and while one of the reasons for such execution was physical eradication of foreigners, it also served purpose to burn the evidence "to ashes" to hide it from the Western press. The motive of this type of execution was similar to that of the political eradication of Khmer Rouge. After a forced confession was extracted through an interrogation via the ritual of "smashing", a codeword for summary execution, Nuon Chea specifically ordered that Westerners such as Britons, Americans, New Zealanders and Australians must be "smashed" in "form of burning to ash". For Pol Pot, the "smashing" was not simply an execution, as he viewed enemies as not human, but "microbes", "bacteria", and "cancer". As the "smashing" was actually cleansing and purifying the land, the brutality was used as propaganda to show the Cambodian public that a “cleaning” was taking place which could be a motivation for burning Westerners alive to ashes as a standard procedure. John Dawson Dewhirst was one of the prisoners who got executed in this manner.

== See also ==
- Cruel, inhuman or degrading treatment
- Church Street, Pretoria bombing
- Amanzimtoti bombing
- Durban beach-front bombing
- Johannesburg Magistrate's Court bombing
- Vaal uprising
- Make South Africa ungovernable
