= List of chief ministers of KwaNdebele =

This is a list of executive leaders of the former bantustan of KwaNdebele in South Africa. Dates in italics indicate de facto continuation of office.

== Chief executive councillors: 1977–1981 ==
Name	Term	
Simon Skosana	7 October 1977	31 March 1981

From October 1977 to 30 September 1979, the territory was known as the Ndebele Territorial Authority. On 1 October 1979, it was officially established as a homeland with a legislative assembly under the new name KwaNdebele. Simon Skosana remained in office as Chief Executive Councillor until 1 April 1981, when KwaNdebele was granted self-governing status and Skosana was appointed to the new position of Chief Minister of KwaNdebele.

== Chief ministers: 1981–1994 ==
Name	Term	
Simon Skosana	1 April 1981	17 November 1986
Klaas Mtshiweni (acting)	17 November 1986	27 November 1986
George Majozi Mahlangu	27 November 1986	3 February 1989
Jonas Masana Mabena	3 February 1989	30 April 1990
James Mahlangu	30 April 1990	26 April 1994
KwaNdebele re-integrated into South Africa on 27 April 1994.

== See also ==
- President of South Africa
- State President of South Africa
- List of prime ministers of South Africa
- Governor-General of the Union of South Africa
- Apartheid
- List of historical unrecognized states and dependencies
