= Death of Maki Skosana =

1985 lynching of woman in South Africa

Maki Skosana (c. 1961 – July 20, 1985) was a South African woman who was burned to death and the footage broadcast live on apartheid-era South Africa's state-run television. She was killed by a mob of anti-apartheid activists who suspected her of being a police informant. Her death by "necklacing" elicited outrage beyond the nation. The Truth and Reconciliation Commission has identified Skosana as the first known victim of necklacing, although it is more likely that she was not the first such lynching, only the first filmed.

== Death ==
Maki Skosana, 24, was an unmarried factory worker and single mother to a five-year-old son.

On July 20, 1985, the 24-year-old Skosana was the first of a series of victims in South Africa to be filmed being killed by necklacing. Necklacing was a brutal practice that occurred in townships, even after apartheid was abolished in the early 1990s.

Skosana's death occurred in the township of Duduza, west of Nigel on the East Rand, Gauteng. Suspected of being an informer for the South African Police, Skosana was killed for her presumed involvement in the deaths of four youth activists who were given faulty grenades that would explode the moment the pin was removed and told to attack police houses. Their deaths were reportedly planned by the "Third Force": a supposed group of covert government operatives tasked with managing township resistance. Hundreds of people came out for the two funerals, and footage of the crowds was broadcast live on television.

It was because of her presumed role as a police informer that she was killed whilst attending the funeral of a friend, who was one of the four murdered activists. While it was Joe Mamasela, under command of his superiors (including Jack Cronje, Johan van der Merwe, Johann Coetzee and even the then state president P. W. Botha), who had planned their deaths, it was because of an assumed connection to him that Skosana was believed to have been associated to the explosion that led to their deaths.

After the funeral, a mob of 500 people chased Skosana from a cemetery across a field. The mob seized her, beat her with clubs, and then knocked her to the ground and kicked her until she was semi-conscious and half-naked. A large rock was put on her so she could not get up. They put a tire around her neck, doused her with petrol and set her on fire.

Evelyn Moloko, Skosana's sister, said Skosana was burned to death with a tire around her neck while attending the funeral of one of the youths. Her body had been scorched by fire and some broken pieces of glass had been inserted into her vagina, Moloko told the committee. Moloko added that a big rock had been thrown on her sister's face after she had been killed.

== Film footage of necklacing ==
Television cameras captured her death on live broadcast. The graphic images of her death depict her having a tire doused in petrol put around her neck and then set alight, burning her to death. These images of her death, filmed by the South African Broadcasting Corporation (SABC), were rebroadcast by the apartheid-era state media as anti-resistance propaganda. Skosana's death was the first time that a necklacing had been caught on camera.

== Legacy ==
Although it was originally believed that she had an affiliation to the deaths of the activists, it was not until her story was dealt with in the Truth and Reconciliation Commission that it was discovered that she had simply been "at the wrong place at the wrong time." Her sister, Evelina Puleng Moloko, testified on Skosana's behalf at the Truth and Reconciliation Commission hearings, at which time Maki Skosana was found innocent of the accusations brought against her. The commission found that Skosana "was wrongly accused of being an informer and responsible for the death of the 'comrades' in the booby-trapped hand grenade incidents."

In light of this new evidence, Skosana and her family can now be seen "as heroes", instead of traitors. A moment of silence was dedicated to them during the hearing. The commission considered her a pawn of an even bigger struggle - "the scapegoat for growing rage".
