= Ntongela Masilela =

Professor Ntongela John Masilela
- Born: December 9, 1948; Soweto
- Died: July 6, 2020 (aged 71); Bangkok, Thailand

Ntongela Masilela was a South-African-born professor of English & World Literature (and, upon retirement, professor emeritus in Creative Studies) at Pitzer College and adjunct professor of African-American Studies at the University of California (Irvine & Los Angeles). He was the eldest son of Florence Vuyiswa Masilela and Dr Albert Mahlathini Magija Masilela, who was an alumnus of UCLA.

Due to apartheid, the family went into exile in Nairobi, Kenya while Ntongela was a teenager. After attending Delamere Boys High School, he followed in his father's footsteps by obtaining his BA, MA, and PhD degrees at UCLA. His doctoral thesis was Theory and History in Marxist Poetics.
