= Lwazi Skosana =

South African soccer player

Personal information
- Full name: Lwazi Mandla Skosana
- Date of birth: 2 August 1991 (age 35)
- Place of birth: Daveyton, South Africa
- Height: 1.65 m (5 ft 5 in)
- Position: Midfielder

Youth career
- Africa Sport Youth Development
- Moroka Swallows

Senior career*
Years	Team	Apps	(Gls)
2010–2013	Moroka Swallows	5	(0)
2013	Roses United	1	(0)
2014–?	Orlando Pirates		
2014	Bay United	1	(0)
- * Club domestic league appearances and goals as of 16 January 2014

Lwazi Skosana (born 2 August 1991) is a South African soccer player who played as a midfielder.

As a Moroka Swallows youth player, Skosana was promoted to the first in the 2010–11 season and has been a regular feature the first squad, being used mostly as a substitute. He never made any appearances in the 2012–13 season and Swallows declined to extend his contract.

In December 2013, Skosana has started to train with Orlando Pirates and on 16 January 2014, the club officially announced that he is a new Orlando Pirates player.
