= Duduza =

- Location within Gauteng Location within South Africa
- Coordinates: 26°23′S 28°24′E
- Country: South Africa
- Province: Gauteng
- Municipality: Ekurhuleni
- Established: 1964

Area
  - Total: 11.23 km^{2} (4.34 sq mi)

Population (2011)
  - Total: 73,295
  - Density: 6,527/km^{2} (16,900/sq mi)

Racial makeup (2011)
  - Black African: 98.9%
  - Coloured: 0.4%
  - Indian/Asian: 0.2%
  - White: 0.1%
  - Other: 0.4%

First languages (2011)
  - Zulu: 64.7%
  - Sotho: 16.2%
  - Xhosa: 5.8%
  - Northern Sotho: 2.6%
  - Other: 10.7%
- Time zone: UTC+2 (SAST)
- Postal code (street): 1496
- PO box: 1494

Duduza is a township west of Nigel on the East Rand, Gauteng, South Africa. It was established in 1964 when Indigenous Africans were resettled from Charterston because it was considered by the apartheid government to be too close to a white town. A local authority was established in 1983. Duduza experienced violent school, consumer, bus, and rent boycotts from 1984 to 1987. A state of emergency was imposed in July 1985 and the South African Army was called in as the violence peaked.

The name Duduza means "to comfort" in English; this was to comfort the forced removal of the residents of the then-Charterston township, which was also known as Beirut.

Duduza was one of the most highly active townships in South Africa in the fight against apartheid. It is also recorded as the first place where a 'Necklacing' was filmed, when 'Maki Skosana' was burned to death by using a tire filled with petrol.

Duduza has produced prominent figures such as Speaker of the Gauteng Province Legislature Ntombi Mekgwe, Vuyo Mokoena named the King of South African gospel, Emma Mkhwanazi former lead singer of the IPCC, Professor Njabulo Ndebele, and Mondy Johannes Motloung who was an MK Cadre and political activists in pursuit of social justice, freedom and equality in South Africa.

Famous sportsman include Bafana Bafana football player Bongani Zungu and South African international cricketer Mangaliso Mosehle.
