= Dumisani Masilela =

South African actor and musician (1988-2017)

- Born: Dumisani Masilela; May 31, 1988; South Africa
- Died: 3 August 2017 (aged 29); South Africa
- Occupations: Actor, Musician, Soccer player
- Years active: 2011–2017
- Spouse: Simphiwe Ngema (m. 2017)
- Children: none

Dumisani Masilela (31 May 1988 – 3 August 2017), was a South African actor, musician and former soccer player. As an actor, he is best known for the role in the television serial Rhythm City.

== Personal life ==
Masilela was born on 31 May 1988 in South Africa. His mother is Sabata Masilela.

He dated fellow actress, Simphiwe Norma, for three and a half years. They married in June 2017, with his untimely death occurring two months after his wedding.

== Career ==
He was a professional soccer player at SuperSport United for many years. However his career was sidelined after a car accident. After the accident, he underwent three years of rehabilitation before starting a music career. In 2011, he started his music career and became a finalist during the eighth season of M-Net singing reality competition Idols. In 2012, he joined the cast of the popular eTV soap opera Rhythm City and played the role "Sifiso Ngema". His role became very popular, where he continued to play the role for five consecutive years until his death in 2017. In the meantime, he recorded a song "Ungasabi" for the show. After his death, the filming of the soap was suspended for two days.

On 22 August 2017, his wife released Masilela's last recorded song "UPhushiwe" on the Fresh Breakfast show on Metro FM.

== Death ==
On 2 August 2017, Masilela was shot in the stomach during a hijacking in Tembisa, where reports suggest he was sitting inside a Golf 7 with a friend, Bongani Nkosi. After being shot once, he managed to drive himself to the hospital where the two switched places shortly after the shooting and Nkosi drove Masilela to hospital. Then he underwent immediate surgery, but died as a result of severe injuries on the following day. According to police investigations, the murder suspects had hijacked another vehicle on that day and had attempted to hijack Masilela when he was shot. The memorial service was held on 9 August 2017. The funeral service was held on 12 August 2017.

In August, five men were found guilty of murder and were arrested. These five men were: Bongani John Masombuka, Sfundo Harrison Nkosi, Khumbuzo Solomon Mukhaba, Brian Makhubedu, and Mashudu Malema, while the fifth suspect died in a robbery. They were produced to the Gauteng High Court in Pretoria, where Makhuba was found to have pulled the trigger on Masilela. On 19 August 2017, Gauteng police arrested the sixth and final suspect of the murder. The suspect person appeared in the Benoni Magistrate Court and then joined with other suspects set for trial in the Pretoria High Court from October 8 to 19. Finally they were sentenced to life imprisonment by the North Gauteng High Court in Pretoria after a lengthy trial in 2019.
