= KwaNdebele =

Bantustan in South Africa (1981–1994)

Coordinates: 25.4320°S 28.7080°E

- 1981–1994
- Flag Coat of arms

- Location of KwaNdebele (red) within South Africa (yellow).
- Status: Bantustan
- Capital: KwaMhlanga
- Common languages: Southern Ndebele; Northern Ndebele; Sepedi
- History
  - Self-government: 1 April 1981
  - Re-integrated into South Africa: 27 April 1994

Area
- 1980: 1,970 km^{2} (760 sq mi)

Population
  - 1980: 156,380
  - 1991: 404,246
- Currency: South African rand
Preceded by	Succeeded by
Republic of South Africa	Republic of South Africa

Ndebele
- Person: iNdebele
- People: AmaNdebele
- Language: IsiNdebele
- Country: KwaNdebele

KwaNdebele was a Bantustan in South Africa, intended by the apartheid government as a semi-independent homeland for the Ndebele people. The homeland was created when the South African government purchased nineteen white-owned farms and installed a government.

== History ==
The homeland was granted self-rule in April 1981. Siyabuswa was designated as its capital, but in 1986, the capital was relocated to KwaMhlanga. The KwaNdebele legislature expressed interest in seeking independence (as in the cases of Transkei, Bophuthatswana, Venda and Ciskei) in May 1982. Some preparations were made, but an exceptional lack of viability in economic affairs and land disputes prevented this.

KwaNdebele was re-integrated into South Africa after the 1994 South African general election. It now forms part of the Mpumalanga province.

== Districts in 1991 ==
Districts of the province and population at the 1991 census.

- Mdutjana: 125,485
- Mkobola: 212,771
- Mbibana: 65,989

== See also ==
- Chief Ministers of KwaNdebele

== Bibliography ==
- South Africa 1980/81 – Official Yearbook of the Republic of South Africa ISBN 0-908393-51-2, ISSN 0302-0681
