= Vusi Mkhatshwa =

South African politician (born 1979)

Vusi Mkhatshwa MPL

Mpumalanga MEC for Finance, Economic Development and Tourism
- In office 24 February 2021 – 7 October 2022
- Premier: Refilwe Mtsweni-Tsipane
- Preceded by: Pat Ngomane
- Succeeded by: Nompumelelo Hlophe

Deputy Speaker of the Mpumalanga Provincial Legislature
- In office 22 May 2019 – 24 February 2021
- Preceded by: Bonakele Majuba
- Succeeded by: James Jim Skosana

Member of the Mpumalanga Provincial Legislature
- Incumbent
- Assumed office 22 May 2019

Personal details
- Born: Prince Vusumuzi Mkhatshwa; 26 August 1979 (age 46)
- Party: African National Congress
- Education: University of South Africa; University of Johannesburg

Prince Vusumuzi Mkhatshwa (born 26 August 1979) is a South African politician who served as Mpumalanga's Member of the Executive Council for finance, economic development and tourism from 2021 until 2022. A member of the African National Congress, he previously served as the deputy speaker of the Mpumalanga Provincial Legislature from 2019 to 2021.

== Early life and education ==
Mkhatshwa was born on 26 August 1979. In 2000, he did his Grade 12 at Cefups Academy. He holds a public admin national certificate from the Ehlanzeni TVET College, a certificate in local governance from the University of Johannesburg as well as a higher certificate in economic management science from the University of South Africa.

== Political career ==
Mkhatshwa served as a COCAS chairperson between 1998 and 1999. He held multiple positions in the African National Congress Youth League. He was a branch secretary of the ANC Youth League between 2005 and 2009. In 2012, he was appointed as the provincial coordinator of the youth league's provincial task team. He served in this position for one year until 2013, when he was elected as the deputy provincial secretary of the league, a position that he held until 2016.

Apart from holding positions in the ANC Youth League, he was also an ANC branch chairperson between 2010 and 2013 and a member of the ANC's regional executive committee in Ehlanzeni between 2013 and 2016. In 2016, Mkhatshwa was elected as a member of the provincial executive committee.

=== Municipal politics ===
In addition to holding leadership positions in the ANC and the ANC Youth League, Mkhatshwa was a ward councillor and the ANC's chief whip in the Umjindi Local Municipality between 2009 and 2011. From 2011 until the dissolution of the municipality in 2016, he served as the speaker of the municipality. After that, Mkhatshwa was appointed as the mayoral committee member for roads and transport in the City of Mbombela Local Municipality.

=== Provincial government ===
After the 2019 provincial election, Mkhatshwa was sworn in as a member of the Mpumalanga Provincial Legislature. Thereafter, he was elected deputy speaker of the legislature.

On 24 February 2021, as part of a major executive council reshuffle by premier Refilwe Mtsweni-Tsipane, Mkhatshwa replaced Pat Ngomane as the Member of the Executive Council for Finance, Economic Development and Tourism.

On 7 October 2022, Mkhatshwa was dropped from the provincial executive council during a reshuffle done by Mtsweni-Tsipane. He was succeeded by fellow ANC MPL Nompumelelo Hlophe.

== Personal life ==
Mkhatshwa is married. In November 2019, he was accused of having an affair with fellow ANC MPL Mohita Latchminarain by Latchimarain's husband, Mahendra. Mahendra soon after apologised and retracted the allegation.
