= Lindiwe Ntshalintshali =

South African politician (born 1977)

Lindiwe Ntshalintshali MP
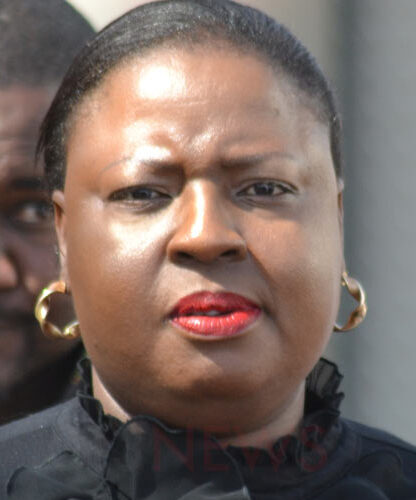
- Ntshalintshali in 2019

Deputy Minister of Correctional Services
- Incumbent
- Assumed office 3 July 2024
- President: Cyril Ramaphosa

Member of the National Assembly of South Africa
- Incumbent
- Assumed office 14 June 2024

Member of the Mpumalanga Executive Council for Social Development
- In office 24 February 2021 – 28 May 2024
- Premier: Refilwe Mtsweni-Tsipane
- Preceded by: Thandi Shongwe
- Succeeded by: Khethiwe Moeketsi

Member of the Mpumalanga Executive Council for Art, Sports, Culture and Recreation
- In office 27 May 2019 – 24 February 2021
- Premier: Refilwe Mtsweni-Tsipane
- Preceded by: Thandi Shongwe
- Succeeded by: Thandi Shongwe

Deputy Provincial Secretary of the African National Congress in Mpumalanga
- In office December 2015 – December 2022
- Preceded by: Violet Siwela

Mayor of Emalahleni Local Municipality
- In office 30 July 2015 – March 2018
- Preceded by: Salome Sithole
- Succeeded by: Linah Malatjie

Personal details
- Born: Leonah Lindiwe Mabona; 11 April 1977 (age 49) Witbank, Eastern Transvaal; South Africa
- Citizenship: South Africa
- Party: African National Congress
- Spouse: Mfanimpela Ntshalintshali
- Occupation: Politician; nurse

Leonah Lindiwe Ntshalintshali (née Mabona; born 11 April 1977) is a South African politician who has been Deputy Minister of Correctional Services and a member of the National Assembly of South Africa since July 2024, representing the African National Congress. She was previously Mpumalanga's Member of the Executive Council for Arts, Sports, Culture and Recreation from 2019 to 2021 before serving as the MEC for Social Development from 2021 until 2024. Ntshalintshali was Mayor of Witbank's Emalahleni Local Municipality from 2015 to 2018.

A nurse by training, Ntshalintshali is a former member of the African National Congress (ANC) Youth League and entered government in 2006 as a local councillor in Emalahleni. While mayor, she became Deputy President of the South African Local Government Association. She left local government and the mayoral position in March 2018, when she became acting Provincial Secretary of the ANC in Mpumalanga. Pursuant to the 2019 general election, she was elected a Member of the Mpumalanga Provincial Legislature and was appointed to the Executive Council of Refilwe Mtsweni-Tsipane, the fifth Premier of Mpumalanga. She was elected to a second term as ANC Deputy Provincial Secretary in April 2022 and resigned to this post when she was elected the member of the ANC's National Executive Committee (NEC) in December 2022.

== Early life and activism ==
Ntshalintshali was born on 11 April 1977 in Lynville, Witbank and grew up in Phola outside Ogies, both towns on the Highveld of what is now Mpumalanga province (then the Transvaal province). She matriculated at Mabande Comprehensive School in 1996 and subsequently obtained a certificate in nursing from Middelburg Nursing College before beginning work as a nurse at Middelburg Hospital, a public hospital in Middelburg, Mpumalanga.

While a student, Ntshalintshali was active in the Congress of South African Students and later in local structures of the African National Congress (ANC) Youth League. In 2005, she was elected to the Provincial Executive Committee of the ANC Youth League in Mpumalanga. In later years, she held a range of positions in local structures of the mainstream ANC, becoming Regional Deputy Secretary of the ANC's Nkangala region.

== Career in government ==
=== Local government: 2006–2018 ===
In the 2006 municipal elections, Ntshalintshali was elected as a local councillor in the Emalahleni Local Municipality. She was among the councillors elected by proportional representation from the ANC's party list and was re-elected to a second term as councillor in the 2011 municipal elections. During her two terms as councillor, she was appointed a Member of the Mayoral Committee for Development and Planning and later for Technical Services.

==== Mayor of Emalahleni ====
On 30 July 2015, toward the end of Ntshalintshali's second term as councillor, the council elected her Executive Mayor of Emalahleni. She replaced Salome Sithole, whom the ANC had "recalled" (asked to resign) as part of the party's efforts to "rejuvenate" ANC-led governments ahead of the August 2016 local government elections. She stood successfully as the ANC's Emalahleni mayoral candidate in the 2016 elections and was elected to a full five-year term as mayor.

In 2016, while mayor, Ntshalintshali was elected as one of three deputy presidents of the South African Local Government Association (SALGA), serving alongside President Parks Tau, mayor of Johannesburg, and fellow deputy presidents Zandile Gumede of eThekwini and Sebenzile Ngangelizwe of Lejweleputswa. Ntshalintshali had previously been a member of SALGA's provincial executive between 2013 and 2015. She also served as president of the African section of United Cities and Local Government.

==== ANC Deputy Provincial Secretary ====
Simultaneously, Ntshalintshali was a member of the Provincial Executive Committee of the ANC in Mpumalanga, having been elected to the seat at a party elective conference in 2012. At the next elective conference in December 2015, she was elected ANC Deputy Provincial Secretary.

In mid-March 2018, she announced that she intended to resign as mayor in order to concentrate on her party-political work. She was appointed to lead the ANC's election campaign in Mpumalanga province ahead of the 2019 general election, and she also became acting ANC Provincial Secretary in Mpumalanga, a full-time post at the party's provincial headquarters. She was appointed acting secretary when the incumbent secretary, Mandla Ndlovu, became acting Provincial Chairperson due to the simultaneous departures of longstanding chairperson David Mabuza and his deputy, Violet Siwela.

=== Provincial government: 2019–2024 ===
In the May 2019 general elections, Ntshalintshali was elected as a Member of the Mpumalanga Provincial Legislature, having been ranked fifth on the ANC's provincial party list. Refilwe Mtsweni-Tsipane, the new Premier of Mpumalanga, appointed her as Member of the Executive Council (MEC) for Arts, Sports, Culture and Recreation in the Mpumalanga provincial government. In February 2021, in a reshuffle of the Executive Council, Ntshalintshali traded portfolios with Thandi Shongwe, becoming MEC for Social Development.

==== Assault ====
On 17 July 2019, Ntshalintshali, in her capacity as acting ANC Provincial Secretary, convened a chaotic meeting in Mbombela between two regional branches of the ANC in Mpumalanga, the Bohlabela and Ehlanzeni branches. Ntshalintshali was present to confirm that the leadership committees of both regional branches would be disbanded and that the branches would be amalgamated into a single region, to be governed initially by an unelected interim leadership corps. While she was making this announcement, a scuffle broke out, in which certain ANC members reportedly attacked Ntshalintshali and her bodyguard, including with a chair; two policemen were also injured, and one attendee said that the police had to fire rubber bullets to disperse the meeting. The violence apparently stemmed from unhappiness with the composition of the interim leadership corps as announced by Ntshalintshali at the meeting.

Ntshalintshali's bodyguard laid a case of criminal assault at the Mbombela police station, as did Ntshalintshali. In addition, in late July, the ANC suspended the membership of two regional ANC leaders present at the meeting – eHlanzeni regional chairperson Ngrayi Ngwenya and acting regional treasurer Phindile Nkuna – pending the outcome of a disciplinary hearing. In October, the ANC National Disciplinary Committee found Nkuna guilty of assaulting Ntshalintshali; she was reprimanded and ordered to apologise to Ntshalintshali. Ngwenya, however, was acquitted of the charge against him. Ntshalintshali continued to maintain that Ngwenya had assaulted her and said in the aftermath, "The ANC cannot claim to fight gender-based violence while they cannot protect us who are inside the organisation." She also raised questions about the neutrality of the ANC disciplinary process, calling it "highly managed" and arguing that one of the disciplinary committee's members, Bongani Bongo, was personally friendly with Ngwenya.

==== Factional tensions ====
According to local observers, the attack on Ntshalintshali at the Mbombela meeting in July was connected to broader factional confrontation in the Mpumalanga ANC; in August 2019, she added two additionally bodyguards to her security detail. At that time, the Mpumalanga ANC expected to hold its next provincial elective conference in late 2019 or early 2020, in order to elect a new provincial party leadership – including a permanent replacement for Provincial Chairperson David Mabuza, who had dominated Mpumalanga politics from 2008 to 2018. The Premier of Mpumalanga, Refilwe Mtsweni-Tsipane, had emerged as a contender to succeed Mabuza, and apparently had Mabuza's support. However, Ntshalintshali – who was junior to Mtsweni-Tsipane in the government but senior to her in the ANC – was viewed as a strong opponent of Mtsweni-Tsipane's candidacy. Instead, she supported the so-called "NdlovuChirwa" campaign, led by Mandla Ndlovu and Muzi Chirwa, who included Ntshalintshali on their proposed slate of leadership candidates.

Fellow MEC Peter Nyoni said that Ntshalintshali's opposition to Mtsweni-Tsipane had led to her "being bullied by those who want the organisation [the ANC] to serve their interest at all cost". In August 2019, City Press reported that relations between Ntshalintshali and Mtsweni-Tsipane were so poor that the government's Executive Council had not held a single cabinet meeting in the two-and-a-half months since it was constituted. Mtsweni-Tsipane denied that there were any tensions.

The Mpumalanga ANC's elective conference was delayed due to the COVID-19 pandemic and related lockdown, leaving Ntshalintshali to continue as acting Provincial Secretary throughout 2020 and 2021. In April 2022, when the conference was held, the Ndlovu–Chirwa faction, renamed "Focus", prevailed, securing the election of its entire slate of candidates. Ntshalintshali was re-elected Deputy Provincial Secretary, this time deputising Muzi Chirwa; she won a total of 458 votes from the 700–800 delegates present. The Business Day noted that Ntshalintshali diverged from the rest of the Focus slate in that she was "a staunch ally" of Ace Magashule, the ANC's suspended national secretary general, whereas Ndlovu, Chirwa, and the others supported incumbent ANC President Cyril Ramaphosa. In the aftermath of the provincial conference, Ntshalintshali said that she would seek election to the 80-member National Executive Committee at the party's 55th National Conference in December 2022. She was elected to the NEC; by number of votes received, she ranked 63rd.

=== National government ===
Ntshalintshali was elected to the National Assembly of South Africa in the 2024 general election. She was then appointed to the National Executive by president Cyril Ramaphosa on 30 June 2024.

== Controversies ==
=== Emalahleni expenditures ===
In September 2016, while Ntshalintshali was mayor, the Emalahleni council controversially approved a decision to use R1.5 million in public funds, a budget rollover from developmental projects, to buy a new mayoral car for Ntshalintshali. Her current car was reportedly a Lexus and the municipality reportedly intended to replace it with a new Lexus RX450. Following protests from the opposition Democratic Alliance (DA), the purchase was cancelled.

In October 2017, the DA approached the Auditor-General to request an investigation into another municipal expenditure item: Emalahleni had allegedly spent R2.1 million between 4 October and 2 November 2016, during service delivery protests, on an emergency protection force for Ntshalintshali's private residence in Phola. Sizwe Sama Yende of City Press claimed to have seen a municipal document which showed that the government had spent R64,350 per day for 29 days on protecting Ntshalintshali's home. A council spokesman pointed out that the municipality had been billed R2.1 million but had only paid R1.6 million after negotiations with the service provider. He also disputed the context of the payment: City Press claimed that the protests had been precipitated by the proposal to buy a new mayoral Lexus, while the spokesman claimed that they had been related to land invasions and RDP housing. The reports about the protection force were particularly controversial because Emalahleni was undergoing financial problems and because the relevant security contractor was owned by the same man who had received another controversial multimillion-rand tender in 2014, on that occasion to protect senior municipal employees from protests by the South African Municipal Workers' Union.

In 2021, after Ntshalintshali had left Emalahleni and become an MEC, the Mpumalanga provincial government commissioned a forensic investigation into alleged improprieties that occurred in the council under her tenure. The investigation was launched by Busi Shiba, then the MEC for Cooperative Governance and Traditional Affairs. In March 2022, the report of the investigation recommended that Ntshalintshali should be subject to criminal charges in relation to a decision to increase the salaries of municipal managers, which the report said had been unlawful. Both the DA and the Economic Freedom Fighters, another political party, had earlier opened a criminal case against her on similar grounds. Ntshalintshali denied that she had taken any unlawful decisions as mayor.

=== Leaked recording ===
In January 2020, while Ntshalintshali was an MEC, SABC aired an audio recording of a woman, alleged to be Ntshalintshali, apparently discussing members of her staff, whom she said she intended to fire, and government tenders. The press interpreted the discussion as including allusions to illegal kickbacks. Later in January, a man came forward claiming that he was Ntshalintshali's secret lover and the other voice in the leaked recording. He additionally claimed that Ntshalintshali had twice offered him employment in government. Ntshalintshali denied that she had had an affair with the man and said that the leak was part of an organised attempt to discredit her ahead of the Mpumalanga ANC's elective conference. She did not confirm whether it was her voice in the recording, saying, "I’m not sure about the authenticity of the recording, because I never granted permission to be recorded. So, if there is any recording, it is against the law and somebody must take ownership and we will deal with it legally".

== Personal life ==
She is married to businessman Mfanimpela Ntshalintshali.

On the evening of 19 September 2018, she was the victim of a hijacking. She and her elder sister, Zanele, were ambushed by four armed men outside Zanele's home in Phola township. The men stole Ntshalintshali's maroon Mercedes-Benz GLC Coupé and other personal belongings and left Ntshalintshali and her sister on a gravel road near Bronkhorstspruit, Gauteng off the N4 highway. The following day, the South African Police Service located Ntshalintshali's car and arrested one suspect.
