= Peter Nyoni =

South African politician (born 1966)

Deputy Director-General for the Mpumalanga Provincial Government
- Incumbent
- Assumed office February 2020
- Premier: Refilwe Mtsweni-Tsipane
- Preceded by: Thami Ngwenya

African National Congress provincial executive committee (PEC) member
- In office 2012–2015

Head of the Mpumalanga Department of Co-operative Governance and Traditional Affairs
- In office August 2016 – February 2020
- Premier: David Mabuza (2009 - 2018); Refilwe Mtsweni-Tsipane (2018 - present)

Regional deputy chairperson of the Ehlanzeni ANC region
- In office 2009–2012

Personal details
- Born: Tsietsi Peter Nyoni; 1 January 1966 (age 60) Mpumalanga
- Citizenship: South Africa
- Party: African National Congress
- Relations: Married

Tsietsi Peter Nyoni (born 1 January 1966) is a South African politician and a member of the African National Congress (ANC) who last served as the Deputy Director-General for the Mpumalanga Provincial Government. He previously served as one of the executive directors for the Mpumalanga Human Settlements Department until he was removed in 2013 from the position by then Premier David Mabuza. He was appointed to head the Department of Co-operative Governance and Traditional Affairs in the province in August 2016 until February 2020 when current Premier Refilwe Mtsweni-Tsipane made him the provincial government's Deputy Director-General.

== Political career ==
Nyoni is a senior member of the ANC in Mpumalanga, having served as its regional deputy chairperson in the eHlanzeni region (2009 to 2012) as well as its Provincial Executive Committee (PEC) member (2012 to 2015).

On 27 July 2015, the PEC suspended Nyoni as its member pending a disciplinary process over allegations that he was part of the 'Save Mpumalanga ANC' group that was opposed to the rule of then ANC provincial chairperson and now former deputy president David Mabuza, accusing him of being a dictator and of using bogus delegates to endorse him as provincial chairperson for a third term.

It was formed to oppose the March 2015 provincial general council (PGC) that endorsed Mabuza to stand as chairperson for a third term. Nyoni contested the position of provincial deputy chairperson on a lobby camp opposed to Mabuza which had Mabuza's deputy David Dube as the chairperson.

Nyoni's camp was defeated when Mabuza's camp won at the provincial conference in December 2015, electing Mabuza unopposed as the chairperson of the Mpumalanga ANC for a third term, Violet Siwela as Mabuza's new deputy chairperson, Mandla Ndlovu as provincial secretary, deputy secretary Lindiwe Ntshalintshali and Vusi Shongwe as treasurer. Mabuza's re-election paved his way to go become the national deputy president at the 54th national congress that was held two years later in December 2017 in Nasrec.

After the August 2016 local government elections, Mabuza made a turnabout in ANC politics and called for unity within provincial party's structures, admitting that the ANC was being killed by the factionalism of its leaders and saying he no longer wanted to participate in factions

Still a Premier of Mpumalanga at that time, Mabuza reconciled with Nyoni and appointed him the head of the provincial Department of Co-operative Governance and Traditional Affairs in August 2016. Before this appointment, Nyoni had been a Director for Municipal Capacity Building at the Ehlanzeni District Municipality.

Nyoni was one of the executive directors of the provincial Human Settlements Department that included former ANC provincial deputy chairperson David Dube and PEC member Bongani Bongo who Mabuza refused to renew their contracts in 2013. Mabuza said the reason was because they focused too much on politics and failed to deliver RDP houses.

When Mabuza was elected the deputy president of the ANC on 18 December 2017, Nyoni accepted nomination from ANC members to stand as his successor in Mpumalanga.

Others who were contesting for the position left by Mabuza in Mpumalanga were Mandla Msibi, Pat Ngomane, Sasekani Manzini, Charles Makola, Cathy Dlamini, Fish Mahlalela, Mandla Ndlovu and Refilwe Mtsweni-Tsipane.

The contest was suspended in March 2020 due to the COVID-19 outbreak and was held in April 2022, with Ndlovu emerging as the new provincial chairperson, deputy chair Speedy Mashilo, secretary Muzi Chirwa, deputy secretary Lindiwe Ntshalintshali and treasurer Mandla Msibi.
