= Bonakele Majuba =

South African politician (born 1968)

Bonakele Majuba MPL

Member of the Mpumalanga Executive Council for Finance
- Incumbent
- Assumed office 18 June 2024
- Premier: Mandla Ndlovu
- Preceded by: Office reestablished

Member of the Mpumalanga Executive Council for Education
- In office 29 May 2019 – 14 June 2024
- Premier: Refilwe Mtsweni-Tsipane
- Preceded by: Sibusiso Malaza
- Succeeded by: Cathy Dlamini

Deputy Speaker of the Mpumalanga Provincial Legislature
- In office 22 March 2018 – 7 May 2019
- Preceded by: Violet Siwela
- Succeeded by: Vusi Mkhatshwa

Member of the Mpumalanga Provincial Legislature
- Incumbent
- Assumed office 6 May 2009

Personal details
- Born: Bonakele Amos Majuba; 10 May 1968 (age 57)
- Party: African National Congress; South African Communist Party
- Education: Mehlomakhulu Senior Secondary School; Transvaal College of Education
- Profession: Politician; Educator

Bonakele Amos Majuba (born 10 May 1968) is a South African politician and educator who has served as the MEC (Member of the Executive Council) for Finance in Mpumalanga since June 2024. Previously, he served as the MEC for Education from May 2019 until June 2024. A member of the African National Congress, he has been a Member of the Mpumalanga Provincial Legislature since May 2009. Majuba was the deputy speaker of the provincial legislature between March 2018 and May 2019.

== Early life and education ==
Majuba matriculated from Mehlomakhulu Senior Secondary School and then went on to study at the then Transvaal College of Education where he achieved his senior teachers diploma in 1991. He worked as a teacher at St Joseph's Comprehensive School from 1992 to 2000.

== Political career ==
Majuba was elected as the regional secretary of the South African Democratic Teachers Union for the Western regional office in KwaMhlanga in 2001. He was elected as the SADTU Deputy Provincial Secretary in 2006. In 2004, Majuba was elected as the deputy chairperson of the South African Communist Party's Ephraim Mogale District.

From 2007 to 2008, Majuba was the acting provincial secretary of the SACP in Mpumalanga. He was also elected deputy president of SADTU in 2008. After the 2009 provincial election, Majuba became a Member of the Mpumalanga Provincial Legislature for the African National Congress. He was then elected as the provincial secretary of the SACP later in 2009. He was a member of the provincial legislature's Standing Committee on Public Accounts, the education committee, and many other committees during the fourth legislative term (2009 to 2014). Majuba also served as the chairperson of the Public Works, Roads and Transport committee from 2009 to 2012. Following the 2014 provincial elections, Majuba was appointed to five committees. He was elected as the deputy speaker of the provincial legislature in March 2018.

Following the 2019 provincial election, premier Refilwe Mtsweni-Tsipane appointed Majuba as the Member of the Executive Council (MEC) for the Mpumalanga Department of Education.

Following the 2024 general election, Manzini was moved from the education to the finance portfolio by the newly elected premier Mandla Ndlovu.
