= Gillion Mashego =

South African politician (born 1965)

Gillion Mashego MPL

Mpumalanga MEC for Public Works, Roads and Transport
- In office 4 July 2018 – 24 February 2021
- Premier: Refilwe Mtsweni-Tsipane
- Preceded by: Sasekani Manzini
- Succeeded by: Mohita Latchminarain

Mpumalanga MEC for Public Works, Roads and Transport
- In office 30 May 2014 – 4 July 2018
- Premier: David Mabuza; Refilwe Mtsweni-Tsipane
- Preceded by: Candith Mashego-Dlamini
- Succeeded by: Sasekani Manzini

Member of the Mpumalanga Provincial Legislature
- Incumbent
- Assumed office 21 May 2014

Personal details
- Born: Gillion Pudumo Mashego; 23 November 1965 (age 60) Pilgrim's Rest, Transvaal Province, South Africa
- Party: African National Congress
- Education: Mapulaneng College of Education
- Profession: Politician

Gillion Pudumo Mashego (born 23 November 1965) is a South African politician who served as the Mpumalanga MEC (Member of the Executive Council) for Public Works, Roads and Transport from July 2018 until February 2021. He has been a Member of the Mpumalanga Provincial Legislature for the African National Congress since May 2014. He was the provincial Health MEC from May 2014 until July 2018.

== Early life and education ==
Gillion Pudumo Mashego was born on the 23 November 1965 in Pilgrim's Rest. He attended and matriculated from Sekwai High School. Mashego studied at the Mapulaneng College of Education.

== Political career ==
Mashego joined the United Democratic Front in 1985 and was active in the Hlabekisa Youth Congress. He was also a member of the Mass Democratic Movement and the South African Students Congress. He proceeded to work as a teacher at his former high school between 1988 and 1989. Within the African National Congress, he has served as a member of Bohlabela region. He was first elected deputy chairperson before being elected chairperson.

In 2000, Mashego was employed as a community liaison officer in the provincial department of the sports, culture and recreation. He was later promoted to assistant director. He then worked as a personal assistant in the office of the MEC for Safety and Security. He later occupied the same position in both the agriculture and public works, roads and transport departments.

Mashego was nominated to the Mpumalanga Provincial Legislature after the provincial election held on 7 May 2014. He took office as an MPL on 21 May. Premier David Mabuza appointed him MEC for Health. In March 2018, Refilwe Mtsweni-Tsipane was elected as the provincial premier. She kept Mashego in his post until July 2018, when she announced that he and the Public Works MEC Sasekani Manzini would exchange positions. The changes came into effect on 4 July.

After the 2019 election, Mashego was reappointed to the provincial legislature for his second term. Mtsweni-Tsipane kept him in his post.

On 24 February 2021, premier Mtsweni-Tsipane reshuffled her executive. She removed Mashego from the executive and announced that Mohita Latchminarain would take over as the Public Works MEC.

== Personal life ==
Mashego tested positive for COVID-19 on 13 July 2020.
