= Mohita Latchminarain =

South African politician (1988)

Mohita Latchminarain MPL

Mpumalanga MEC for Public Works, Roads and Transport
- In office 24 February 2021 – 7 October 2022
- Premier: Refilwe Mtsweni-Tsipane
- Preceded by: Gillion Mashego
- Succeeded by: Mandla Ndlovu

Member of the Mpumalanga Provincial Legislature
- Incumbent
- Assumed office 22 May 2019

Personal details
- Born: 28 August 1988 (age 37)
- Party: African National Congress
- Spouse: Mahendra (m. 2010)
- Profession: Politician

Mohita Latchminarain (née Singh; born 28 August 1988) is a South African politician from Mpumalanga who served as the Member of the Executive Council (MEC) for the Mpumalanga Department of Public Works, Roads and Transport from February 2021 until October 2022. She has been a Member of the Mpumalanga Provincial Legislature since May 2019. Latchminarain is a member of the governing African National Congress.

== Political career ==
A member of the African National Congress, Latchminarain was elected to the Mpumalanga Provincial Legislature in the 2019 provincial election as the ANC retained its majority. On 22 May 2019, she was sworn in as a member of the provincial legislature. Latchminarain was then elected to serve on multiple committees.

On 24 February 2021, premier Refilwe Mtsweni-Tsipane reshuffled the provincial executive council and appointed Latchminarain as the MEC (Member of the Executive Council) responsible for the provincial Department of Public Works, Roads and Transport. She was sworn in later that day and took over from Gillion Mashego, who was dismissed as an MEC. The Democratic Alliance welcomed her appointment.

On 7 October 2022, Latchminarain was dropped from the executive council. Cogta MEC Mandla Ndlovu succeeded her as Public Works, Roads and Transport MEC.

== Personal life ==
Latchminarain (then Singh) married Mahendra Latchminarain in 2010. In 2018 she filed another divorce application against her husband after the first application made in 2016 had lapsed. Mohita is a lawyer by profession. She obtained her Bachelor of Law (LLB) degree at the University of South Africa in 2010 at the age of 21. In November 2019, Mahendra wrote a letter to premier Mtsweni-Tsipane, in which he accused Mohita of having an affair with the deputy speaker of the legislature, Vusi Mkhatshwa. He soon after apologised and said that he regretted not verifying the screenshot of the fake text messages between Mohita and Mkhatshwa.
