= Pat Ngomane =

South African politician (born 1964)

Pat Ngomane MPL

Mpumalanga MEC for Finance, Economic Development and Tourism
- In office 29 May 2019 – 24 February 2021
- Premier: Refilwe Mtsweni-Tsipane
- Preceded by: Eric Kholwane
- Succeeded by: Vusi Mkhatshwa

Mpumalanga MEC for Community Safety, Security and Liaison
- In office 17 August 2016 – 28 May 2019
- Premier: Refilwe Mtsweni-Tsipane; David Mabuza
- Preceded by: Vusi Shongwe
- Succeeded by: Gabisile Tshabalala

Member of the Mpumalanga Provincial Legislature
- Incumbent
- Assumed office 21 May 2014

Personal details
- Born: Petrus Simon Ngomane; 4 September 1964 (age 61)
- Party: African National Congress
- Education: Mdzabu High School
- Alma mater: Regenesys Business School; University of Zululand
- Profession: Politician

Petrus Simon "Pat" Ngomane (born 4 September 1964) is a South African politician. A member of the African National Congress, he was elected to the Mpumalanga Provincial Legislature in May 2014. He served as the Member of the Executive Council (MEC) for Community Safety, Security and Liaison from August 2016 until May 2019, when he was appointed MEC for Finance, Economic Development and Tourism. Ngomane served in the position until an executive council reshuffle in February 2021.

== Early life and education ==
Ngomane was born on 4 September 1964. He matriculated from Mdzabu High School in 1986. In 2001, he obtained a B.Sc. in hydrology from the University of Zululand. He then went on to achieve a post-graduate diploma in public administration from Regenesys Business School in 2004.

== Political career ==
Ngomane was a member of the South African Student Congress (SASCO). He joined the African National Congress Youth League and served as a branch leader. He also served as a chairperson of the National Education, Health and Allied Workers' Union. Ngomane worked as an environmental officer of the Mpumalanga Parks Board from 2002 to 2006. Between 2006 and 2008, he was a senior manager at the Mbombela Local Municipality. He was elected the regional secretary of the ANC's Ehlanzeni region in 2008 and held this position until 2014.

Ngomane was elected to the Mpumalanga Provincial Legislature in 2014. He was sworn in as a member on 21 May 2014. The ANC appointed him deputy chief whip and chairperson of portfolio committees. On 17 August 2016, premier David Mabuza reshuffled his executive, in which he appointed Ngomane the Member of the Executive Council (MEC) for Community Safety, Security and Liaison. He was sworn in on the same day and succeeded Vusi Shongwe.

Refilwe Mtsweni-Tsipane was elected the provincial premier in March 2018. She retained him in his post. After his re-election in May 2019, Ngomane was appointed MEC for Finance, Economic Development and Tourism, succeeding Eric Kholwane.

On 24 February 2021, Ngomane was demoted from the executive council and replaced with Vusi Mkhatshwa as the MEC for Finance, Economic Development and Tourism.

== Personal life ==
Ngomane is married.
