= James Skosana =

South African politician (1962–2021)

James Jim Skosana

Deputy Speaker of the Mpumalanga Provincial Legislature
- In office 2 March 2021 – 15 June 2021
- Premier: Refilwe Mtsweni-Tsipane
- Preceded by: Vusi Mkhatshwa

Member of the Mpumalanga Provincial Legislature
- In office 28 February 2018 – 15 June 2021

Member of the National Assembly of South Africa
- In office 6 May 2009 – 27 February 2018

Personal details
- Born: James Jim Skosana; 25 April 1962
- Died: 15 June 2021 (aged 59)
- Party: African National Congress (Until 2021)
- Other political affiliations: South African Communist Party (Until 2021)
- Occupation: Educator, politician

James Jim "JJ" Skosana (25 April 1962 – 15 June 2021) was a South African politician. A member of the African National Congress, he served in the South African National Assembly from May 2009 to February 2018, when he became a member of the Mpumalanga Provincial Legislature. In March 2021 Skosana was elected as the deputy speaker of the provincial legislature.

== Background ==
Skosana was born on 25 April 1962. He worked as an educator at Sekmisa Primary School before he became involved in politics.

== Political career ==
Skosana was a member of the African National Congress (ANC), the South African Communist Party (SACP) and the South African National Civic Organisation (SANCO). After leaving teaching, he served as an ANC councillor in the Dr JS Moroka Local Municipality where he was later elected mayor. During his term as mayor, Skosana was robbed at gunpoint at his home. He was then forced into the assailants' vehicle and they dropped him off near Kwaggafontein A.

In 2009 Skosana was elected to the National Assembly as an ANC representative. He was re-elected in 2014. During his time in parliament, he served on the Portfolio Committee of Water Affairs and Environmental Affairs, the Portfolio Committee on Defence and Military Veterans and the Portfolio Committee on Higher Education.

On 27 February 2018, Skosana resigned from the National Assembly. He was sworn in as a member of the Mpumalanga Provincial Legislature the next day. After the 2019 national and provincial elections, Skosana became the chair of chairs, the chief whip of the ANC and the chairperson of the Standing Committee on Public Accounts in the legislature. He served on almost all the committees.

On 2 March 2021, Skosana was elected deputy speaker of the Mpumalanga provincial legislature, replacing Vusi Mkhatshwa, who was appointed MEC for Finance, Economic Development and Tourism.

== Death ==
Skosana died on 15 June 2021 of COVID-19 related diseases, during the COVID-19 pandemic in South Africa. His funeral was held on 20 June.

Political offices
| Preceded by Vusi Mkhatshwa | Deputy Speaker of the Mpumalanga Provincial Legislature; 2021 | Succeeded by TBD |
