= Sibusiso Malaza =

South African politician

Member of the Mpumalanga Executive Council for Education
- In office March 2018 – 7 May 2019
- Premier: Refilwe Mtsweni-Tsipane
- Preceded by: Reginah Mhaule
- Succeeded by: Bonakele Majuba

Member of the Mpumalanga Provincial Legislature
- In office 21 May 2014 – 7 May 2019

Personal details
- Citizenship: South Africa
- Party: African National Congress

Sibusiso Innocent Malaza is a South African politician who served as Mpumalanga's Member of the Executive Council (MEC) for Education between March 2018 and May 2019. He represented the African National Congress (ANC) in the Mpumalanga Provincial Legislature from 2014 until 2019, when he failed to gain re-election.

== Legislative career ==
Malaza served a single term in the provincial legislature, having been elected to his seat in the 2014 general election, ranked 21st on the ANC's provincial party list. Towards the end of the legislative term, in March 2018, Refilwe Mtsweni-Tsipane took office as Premier of Mpumalanga after David Mabuza resigned. In a reshuffle announced by Mtsweni-Tsipane shortly after her inauguration, Malaza was appointed to the Mpumalanga Executive Council as MEC for Education. He held that office for just over a year: in the 2019 general election, he was ranked 24th on the ANC's party list and failed to gain re-election to the provincial legislature, and he therefore dropped out of the Executive Council.

As of 2021, Malaza was the acting municipal manager at Msukaligwa Local Municipality in Mpumalanga.
