= Dumisani =

- Gender: Male
- Language: Nguni

Other gender
- Feminine: Dumisile

Origin
- Origin: Southern Africa
- Meaning: To give praise/To worship

Other names
- Related names: Rendani; Mbongeni

Dumisani is a Nguni masculine name meaning "to give praise" or "to worship". Notable people with the name include:

- Dumisani Mthenjane, South African politician
- Dumisani Mpofu (born 1973), Zimbabwean footballer
- Dumisani Ngwenya (born 1984), South African soccer player
- Dumisani Zondi (born 1957), South African judge
