= Jackie Macie =

South African politician (1976)

The Honourable Jackie Macie MPL

MEC for the Department of Security, Community Safety and Liaison
- Incumbent
- Assumed office June 2024
- Premier: Mandla Ndlovu
- Preceded by: Vusi Shongwe

Regional chairperson of the African National Congress in Ehlanzeni region
- Incumbent
- Assumed office April 2022
- Preceded by: Ngrayi Ngwenya

Personal details
- Born: Khensani Jackie Macie; 17 March 1976 (age 50)
- Citizenship: South Africa
- Party: African National Congress
- Profession: Politician

Khensani Jackie Macie (born 17 March 1976) is a South African politician who is currently serving as an MEC for the Mpumalanga Department of Security, Community Safety and Liaison since June 2024, appointed by premier Mandla Ndlovu. He was sworn in as a member of the Mpumalanga Provincial Legislature in May 2023. Macie is also the current regional chairperson of the African National Congress in the Ehlanzeni region since April 2022.
