= Ngrayi Ngwenya =

South African politician (born 1964)

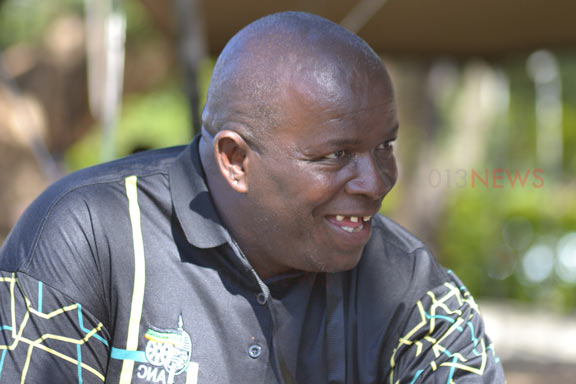
- Ngwenya in 2019
- Born: Micheal Ngrayi Ngwenya; 29 March 1964 (age 62); Nkomazi, Mpumalanga, South Africa
- Occupation: Politician
- Political party: African National Congress, Economic Freedom Fighters

Micheal Ngrayi Ngwenya (born 29 March 1964) is a South African politician from Mpumalanga. He was Regional Chairperson of the African National Congress (ANC) in Ehlanzeni, Mpumalanga from 2011 to 2019, in which capacity he was an influential ally of Premiers David Mabuza and Refilwe Mtsweni-Tsipane. In July 2021, he was suspended from the party for five years because of his role in organising a political rally in support of former President Jacob Zuma. Nicknamed 'Lomdzala', Ngwenya joined the Economic Freedom Fighters (EFF) in June 2023. Immediately after Joining EFF, the ANC offices in Drikoppies, Mpumalanga rebranded from the traditional ANC colours to EFF colours and logo. He has successfully established EFF at Nkomzazi by influencing longtime ANC supporters.

== ANC Regional Chairperson: 2011–2019 ==
Ngwenya was elected as Regional Chairperson of the ANC's Ehlanzeni branch in 2011 with the support of David Mabuza, who was the Premier of Mpumalanga and Provincial Chairperson of the Mpumalanga ANC. He held that position until mid-2019, when the branch was disbanded in preparation for a merger. He was viewed as Mabuza's "right-hand man".

In September 2013, Ngwenya was convicted of assaulting politician Collen Sedibe and sentenced to pay a R1,000 fine. The charges arose from an incident during an ANC meeting on 18 April, at which Ngwenya and another man had punched and kicked Sedibe after a disagreement; the incident also led to Sedibe's expulsion from the ANC.

At another political event, held in Nkomazi in November 2018 during the ANC's 2019 general election campaign, Ngwenya was allegedly again involved in a violent confrontation with other ANC members. Faith Makumo laid criminal charges against him, alleging that he had stabbed her. He appeared in court in August 2018 but the trial was postponed.

=== Alleged assault of Lindiwe Ntshalintshali ===
In July 2019, violence broke out at an ANC meeting called to discuss a decision to disband the Ehlanzeni and Bohlabela regional branches in order to amalgamate them into a single branch; acting ANC Provincial Secretary Lindiwe Ntshalintshali sustained minor injuries before the police dispersed the crowd with rubber bullets. After Ntshalintshali laid criminal charges against him, Ngwenya was suspended from the ANC.

Although an application to reverse his suspension in the Pretoria High Court failed, Ngwenya's membership was restored in October, when the ANC National Disciplinary Committee acquitted him of misconduct. Ntshalintshali continued to maintain that Ngwenya had assaulted her and said in the aftermath, "The ANC cannot claim to fight gender-based violence while they cannot protect us who are inside the organisation." She also raised questions about the neutrality of the ANC disciplinary process, calling it "highly managed" and arguing that one of the disciplinary committee's members, Bongani Bongo, was personally friendly with Ngwenya.

== Suspension from the ANC: 2021–present ==
With David Mabuza, Ngwenya was viewed as a key supporter of Premier Refilwe Mtsweni-Tsipane's bid to succeed Mabuza as ANC Provincial Chairperson. He endorsed Mtsweni-Tsipane publicly at an early stage of the contest in June 2018. In 2019, as the Mpumalanga ANC prepared to hold various elective conferences, Ngwenya was caught on video handing out cash to an audience at a party event; when he was reported to the ANC's headquarters at Luthuli House, Ngwenya denied that he was buying votes, saying that he had given the money to people who would not be delegates to the elective conferences.

In July 2021, Ngwenya was suspended from the ANC with immediate effect "for a number of acts which appear to be in conflict with the constitution, values, principles and traditions of the ANC". The previous weekend, Ngwenya had attended a rally at the Nkandla homestead of former President Jacob Zuma, who had been sentenced to prison for contempt of court. The ANC said that Ngwenya had brought the ANC into disrepute with an "inflammatory speech" in support of Zuma, and that he had also contravened COVID-19 regulations by organising the transport of people to the rally. His suspension would last five years, until 2026.

Ngwenya's suspension entailed that he was not eligible to stand as a candidate when the Ehlanzeni ANC (now including Bohlabela) elected a new leadership in April 2022, and Jackie Macie was elected as Regional Chairperson instead, defeating the slate of candidates aligned to Ngwenya and Gillion Mashego. In February 2022, Ngwenya told a local radio station that "I am not part of anything that involves the ANC" and that he was focusing on his business career. However, he remained an influential figure in Mpumalanga politics. He also remained a key supporter of Mabuza, who was expected to stand for the ANC presidency or deputy presidency at the party's 53rd National Conference in 2023, and he claimed that the ANC had suspended him precisely in order to thwart Mabuza's rise.
