= Gabisile Tshabalala =

South African politician (born 1979)

Gabisile Tshabalala MPL

Member of the Mpumalanga Provincial Legislature
- Incumbent
- Assumed office 21 May 2014

Member of the Mpumalanga Executive Council for Community Safety, Security and Liaison
- In office May 2019 – February 2021
- Premier: Refilwe Mtsweni-Tsipane
- Preceded by: Pat Ngomane
- Succeeded by: Vusi Shongwe

Personal details
- Born: April 2, 1979 (age 47)
- Citizenship: South Africa
- Party: African National Congress

Cynthia Gabisile Tshabalala, also spelled Gabsile Tshabalala (born 2 April 1979), is a South African politician who has represented the African National Congress (ANC) in the Mpumalanga Provincial Legislature since 2014. She was formerly Mpumalanga's Member of the Executive Council (MEC) for Community Safety, Security and Liaison from May 2019 to February 2021.

== Legislative career ==
Tshabalala was active in the ANC Youth League in Mpumalanga. She was elected to the provincial legislature in the 2014 general election, ranked 20th on the ANC's provincial party list. She served as the legislature's Deputy Chief Whip during the legislative term that followed. She was re-elected to her legislative seat in the 2019 general election, ranked 14th on the ANC's party list.

Shortly after the 2019 election, she was appointed to the Mpumalanga Executive Council by Refilwe Mtsweni-Tsipane, the incumbent Premier of Mpumalanga, who named her MEC for Community Safety, Security and Liaison. Tshabalala served less than two years as MEC before Mtsweni-Tsipane fired her on 24 February 2021. She was fired along with three other MECs who, like Tshabalala, were viewed as loyalists of Deputy President David Mabuza, Mtsweni-Tsipane's predecessor and political rival.
