= Eric Kholwane =

South African politician (born 1972)

Mpumalanga MEC for Finance, Economic Development and Tourism
- In office 30 May 2014 – 7 May 2019
- Premier: Refilwe Mtsweni-Tsipane; David Mabuza
- Preceded by: Pinky Phosa (as MEC for Economic Development, Environment and Tourism); Madala Masuku (as MEC for Finance)
- Succeeded by: Pat Ngomane

Member of the Mpumalanga Provincial Legislature
- In office 21 May 2014 – 7 May 2019

Member of the National Assembly of South Africa
- In office 2004 – 7 May 2014

Personal details
- Born: Sikhumbuzo Eric Kholwane; 24 September 1972 (age 54)
- Party: African National Congress; South African Communist Party
- Education: University of the Western Cape; University of South Africa
- Profession: Politician

Sikhumbuzo Eric Kholwane (born 24 September 1972) is a South African politician and lawyer who served as the Mpumalanga MEC for Finance, Economic Development and Tourism from May 2014 to May 2019. He was also a member of the Mpumalanga Provincial Legislature during that time. Prior to serving in the Mpumalanga provincial government, Kholwane was a Member of the National Assembly of South Africa from 2004 to 2014. He is a member of both the African National Congress and the South African Communist Party.

== Early life and education ==
Kholwane was born on 24 September 1972. He obtained a nursing diploma from the Mpumalanga Nursing School. He holds an LLB degree from the University of South Africa. From the University of the Western Cape, he achieved an advanced diploma in human resource and an advanced diploma in international economics.

== Political career ==
Kholwane served on the provincial executive committee of the South African Communist Party. He was also the provincial chairperson and a member of the party's central committee. Within the African National Congress, he was an ex-officio member of the party's Bohlabela region. He was a member of a political education sub-committee as well as the convenor of the administration, finance & ICT unit caucus. He was also a branch secretary. Kholwane was also a branch secretary, a regional secretary and the provincial secretary of the National Education, Health and Allied Workers' Union.

In 2004, Kholwane was elected to the National Assembly of South Africa for the ANC. He was re-elected in 2009. In February 2011, he was elected chairperson of the Portfolio Committee on Communications. He also served on the Portfolio Committee on Safety and Security.

== Provincial government ==
After the 2014 general election, he was sworn in as a Member of the Mpumalanga Provincial Legislature. On 30 May, premier David Mabuza appointed Kholwane Member of the Executive Council for the newly established Finance, Economic Development and Tourism portfolio. He was sworn in on the same day. Refilwe Mtsweni-Tsipane was elected premier in March 2018, and she retained him in his post.

Kholwane left the provincial legislature on 7 May 2019. Pat Ngomane was appointed his successor.

== Personal life ==
In 2012, Kholwane was charged with rape, only to be acquitted a few months later.

On 28 September 2020, Kholwane was arrested for allegedly raping his own daughters aged 7. The ANC temporarily suspended him as a member of the provincial executive committee.
