= David Dube =

South African politician (born 1960)

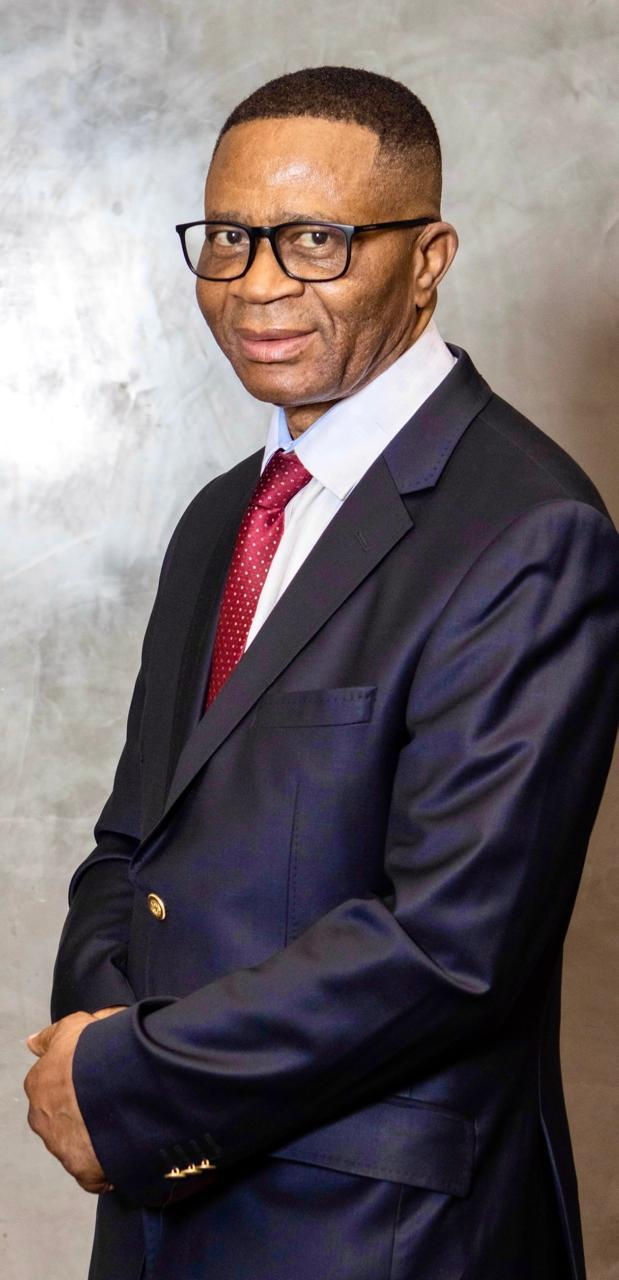
- David Dube in 2025

Member of the Mpumalanga Provincial Legislature
- In office 2012–2019
- Premier: David Mabuza

Deputy speaker of the Mpumalanga Provincial Legislature
- In office 2014–2017

Head of the Mpumalanga Department of Human Settlements
- In office 2009–2013
- Premier: David Mabuza

Provincial deputy chairperson of the African National Congress in Mpumalanga
- In office December 2012 – December 2015

Personal details
- Born: Boy David Ditlaishego Dube; 14 October 1960 (age 66) Lydenburg, Mpumalanga, South Africa

Boy David Ditlaishego Dube (born 14 October 1960 in Lydenburg) is a South African politician. Dube deputised for David Mabuza while Mabuza served as provincial chairperson of the African National Congress in Mpumalanga from 2012 to 2015.

== Early life ==
Dube was born in Lydenburg (now called Mashishing) on 14 October 1960. He matriculated at Burgersfort's Leolo High School in 1982 before obtaining a Diploma in Teaching from Mgwenya College in 1985 and was subsequently employed as a teacher at Kgahlanong High School where he taught history, Afrikaans and Business Economics.

== Education and career ==
Dube is a politician for South Africa's African National Congress (ANC) since 1988 and served in various roles in regional positions before he was elected the party's deputy chairperson along with David Mabuza who became chairperson at that December 2012 elective congress.

He was a member of the South African Democratic Teachers Union (SADTU) since its founding in 1990 and was elected the secretary of the teachers' union in the Lydenburg area in 1992. In 1995, he was elected to chair the ANC in the then Witbank region in 1995 and the Ehlanzeni region in 2001. In 2005, he served as an elected member of the then Bohlabelo ANC executive regional body.

Dube was one of the executives of the provincial Human Settlements Department that included Peter Nyoni and Bongani Bongo who David Mabuza refused to renew their contracts in 2013. Mabuza who was Premier of Mpumalanga then said the reason for not renewing the contracts was because the three focused too much on politics and failed to deliver services to the poor.

He was one of the politicians nominated by ANC branches to contest Mabuza for post of provincial chair at a 2015 provincial congress, but lost when Mabuza emerged unopposed. He threw the hat in the ring again in 2022 but didn't receive enough votes to stand for nomination, leading to the conference to be a two-way race between Mandla Ndlovu and Lucky Ndinisa. Ndlovu won the conference.

Dube holds a PhD in Public Administration from the University of Fort Hare. Others of his qualifications include a master's degree in Public Administration from the University of Pretoria (2005), BA honours (education) from Nelson Mandela Bay University (2002), Tech Degree in Education Management as well as other qualifications in local government, project management, training and co-councillor training.

== Criminal charges and acquittal ==
=== Arrest ===
Dube was arrested in October 2020 and charged with four counts of money-laundering and one of contravening the Public Finance Management Act - charges seen as politically motivated and which emanated from alleged corrupt government land deals in the purchase of two farms, one in Emalahleni and another one in Ermelo in 2010. alleged that the cost of the two farms had been deliberately inflated during procurement. Dube was the head of the Mpumalanga Department of Human Settlements when the deal was entered into. He was arrested with a string of others - businessmen, lawyers and relatives of politicians, including Bongani Bongo, his ex-wife and his brother Joel Bongo.

=== Acquittal ===
In December 2024, Dube was acquitted of all corruption charges by the Middelburg Specialised Commercial Crimes Court. The court found no evidence warranting conviction and all accused were acquitted.

Following the acquittal, Dube stated that the charges were politically motivated and had significantly impacted his personal and political life. He said that the case had deliberately been put against him to hinder his bid to become the African National Congress (ANC) provincial chairperson in Mpumalanga.
