= Cleopas Maunye =

South African politician

Member of the Mpumalanga Provincial Legislature
- In office 21 May 2014 – 31 March 2017

Personal details
- Born: Cleopas Maunye
- Party: African National Congress
- Other political affiliations: Bushbuckridge Residents Association
- Profession: Politician

Cleopas Maunye is a South African politician. He served as a Member of the Mpumalanga Provincial Legislature for the Bushbuckridge Residents Association from May 2014 until March 2017, when he was recalled from the legislature. Maunye has since rejoined the African National Congress.

== Political career ==
Maunye joined the Bushbuckridge Residents Association, now known as the Better Residents Association, after he left the African National Congress. For the 7 May 2014 general election, he was placed first on the party's candidate list to the Mpumalanga Provincial Legislature. The party won one seat, and he filled that seat on 21 May 2014.

In February 2017, he was suspended from the party, pending a disciplinary hearing. Party leaders accused him of "selling out to the ANC." He was then recalled from the provincial legislature effective 31 March 2017 and rejoined the ANC on 2 April. Cecil Shilwake succeeded him as the BRA's sole representative in the legislature.
