= Mbongeni =

- Gender: Male
- Language: Nguni

Origin
- Origin: Southern Africa
- Meaning: To give thanks/To praise

Other names
- Related names: Rendani; Dumisani; Dumisile

Mbongeni is a given name, derived from the Nguni word ukubonga, meaning "to praise". Notable people with the name include:

- Mbongeni Buthelezi (born 1966), South African artist
- Mbongeni Khumalo, South African poet
- Mbongeni Mzimela, South African footballer
- Mbongeni Ngema, South African writer
- Phesheya Mbongeni Dlamini, politician
