= Jeaneth Thabethe =

South African politician

Jeaneth Thabethe MPL

Member of the Mpumalanga Provincial Legislature
- Incumbent
- Assumed office 21 May 2014

Personal details
- Citizenship: South Africa
- Party: African National Congress

Jeaneth Lizzy Thabethe, formerly known as Jeaneth Nghondzweni, is a South African politician who has represented the African National Congress (ANC) in the Mpumalanga Provincial Legislature since 2014. She has served as Deputy Speaker of the Provincial Legislature since May 2022.

== Legislative career ==
Thabethe was elected to her legislative seat in the 2014 general election, ranked 16th on the ANC's provincial party list. She served as the provincial legislature's Chairperson of Committees during the legislative term that followed. In the 2019 general election, she was re-elected to her seat, ranked 21st on the ANC's party list.

In May 2020, during South Africa's Covid-19 lockdown, the opposition Economic Freedom Fighters laid a criminal complaint against Thabethe, alleging that she had received food parcels intended for distribution to residents as part of the South African Social Security Agency's lockdown relief programme. The party claimed that Thabethe had directed a truck of food parcels to her home in Tekwane South outside Mbombela. Thabethe strongly denied the allegations; she said that they were intended to discredit her during the Mpumalanga ANC's ongoing leadership succession battle, in which, according to News24, Thabethe supported a faction aligned to former Premier David Mabuza.

In May 2022, the ANC announced that Thabethe had been named Deputy Speaker of the Mpumalanga Provincial Legislature, serving under Speaker Makhosazane Masilela.
