= Bela-Bela Local Municipality elections =

The Bela-Bela Local Municipality is a Local Municipality in Limpopo, South Africa. The council consists of seventeen members elected by mixed-member proportional representation. Nine councillors are elected by first-past-the-post voting in nine wards, while the remaining eight are chosen from party lists so that the total number of party representatives is proportional to the number of votes received. In the election of 1 November 2021 the African National Congress (ANC) won a majority of ten seats.

== Results ==
The following table shows the composition of the council after past elections.

Event	ANC	DA	EFF	Other	Total
2006 election	12	2	—	1	15
2011 election	12	4	—	1	17
2016 election	9	5	2	1	17
2021 election	10	3	2	2	17

== March 2006 election ==
The following table shows the results of the 2006 election.

Party	Ward			List			Total seats
Party	Votes	%	Seats	Votes	%	Seats	Total seats
African National Congress	8,537	77.08	7	8,600	77.30	5	12
Democratic Alliance	1,348	12.17	1	1,520	13.66	1	2
Onafhanklike Munisipale Kiesersforum	700	6.32	0	525	4.72	1	1
African Christian Democratic Party	187	1.69	0	202	1.82	0	0
Pan Africanist Congress of Azania	179	1.62	0	144	1.29	0	0
United Democratic Movement	125	1.13	0	134	1.20	0	0
Total	11,076	100.00	8	11,125	100.00	7	15
Valid votes	11,076	97.81		11,125	98.23		
Invalid/blank votes	248	2.19		200	1.77		
Total votes	11,324	100.00		11,325	100.00		
Registered voters/turnout	25,152	45.02		25,152	45.03		

== May 2011 election ==
The following table shows the results of the 2011 election.

Party	Ward			List			Total seats
Party	Votes	%	Seats	Votes	%	Seats	Total seats
African National Congress	10,610	64.16	7	11,816	74.85	5	12
Democratic Alliance	3,668	22.18	1	3,759	23.81	3	4
Independent candidates	1,941	11.74	1				1
Congress of the People	185	1.12	0				0
Pan Africanist Congress of Azania	51	0.31	0	130	0.82	0	0
African Christian Democratic Party	81	0.49	0	82	0.52	0	0
Total	16,536	100.00	9	15,787	100.00	8	17
Valid votes	16,536	98.04		15,787	95.05		
Invalid/blank votes	331	1.96		823	4.95		
Total votes	16,867	100.00		16,610	100.00		
Registered voters/turnout	28,329	59.54		28,329	58.63		

== August 2016 election ==
The following table shows the results of the 2016 election.

Party	Ward			List			Total seats
Party	Votes	%	Seats	Votes	%	Seats	Total seats
African National Congress	8,410	51.25	7	8,509	51.79	2	9
Democratic Alliance	4,461	27.18	2	4,471	27.21	3	5
Economic Freedom Fighters	2,121	12.92	0	2,168	13.20	2	2
Bushbuckridge Residents Association	928	5.65	0	940	5.72	1	1
Independent candidates	211	1.29	0				0
Ubuntu Party	85	0.52	0	94	0.57	0	0
Congress of the People	88	0.54	0	70	0.43	0	0
South African Christian Movement	39	0.24	0	82	0.50	0	0
African Christian Democratic Party	25	0.15	0	60	0.37	0	0
Pan Africanist Congress of Azania	43	0.26	0	35	0.21	0	0
Total	16,411	100.00	9	16,429	100.00	8	17
Valid votes	16,411	98.19		16,429	98.13		
Invalid/blank votes	303	1.81		313	1.87		
Total votes	16,714	100.00		16,742	100.00		
Registered voters/turnout	30,212	55.32		30,212	55.42		

=== By-elections from August 2016 to November 2021 ===
The following by-elections were held to fill vacant ward seats in the period from the election in November 2021.

Date	Ward	Party of the previous councillor	Party of the newly elected councillor
17 July 2018	8	Democratic Alliance	African National Congress

In a by-election held on 17 July 2018, a ward previously held by a DA councillor was won by an ANC candidate. Council composition was reconfigured as seen below:

Party	Ward	PR list	Total
African National Congress	8	2	10
DA	1	3	4
Economic Freedom Fighters	0	2	2
Bushbuckridge Residents Association	0	1	1
Total	9	8	17

== November 2021 election ==
The following table shows the results of the 2021 election.

Party	Ward			List			Total seats
Party	Votes	%	Seats	Votes	%	Seats	Total seats
African National Congress	8,470	54.81	8	8,730	56.84	2	10
Democratic Alliance	2,666	17.25	1	2,691	17.52	2	3
Economic Freedom Fighters	1,633	10.57	0	1,860	12.11	2	2
Freedom Front Plus	1,099	7.11	0	1,132	7.37	1	1
Better Residents Association	393	2.54	0	363	2.36	1	1
Independent candidates	627	4.06	0				0
African People's Movement	312	2.02	0	241	1.57	0	0
Belabela Community Revolution	94	0.61	0	113	0.74	0	0
African People's Convention	78	0.50	0	110	0.72	0	0
Congress of the People	60	0.39	0	63	0.41	0	0
African Transformation Movement	22	0.14	0	31	0.20	0	0
Democratic Artists Party				24	0.16	0	0
Total	15,454	100.00	9	15,358	100.00	8	17
Valid votes	15,454	98.73		15,358	98.17		
Invalid/blank votes	199	1.27		287	1.83		
Total votes	15,653	100.00		15,645	100.00		
Registered voters/turnout	31,267	50.06		31,267	50.04		

=== By-elections from November 2021 ===
The following by-elections were held to fill vacant ward seats in the period from the election in November 2021.

Date	Ward	Party of the previous councillor	Party of the newly elected councillor
16 November 2022	7	Democratic Alliance	Freedom Front Plus

In ward 7, a by-election was held after the previous DA councillor resigned. The DA's support dropped from 60% in 2021 to 34%, with the Freedom Front Plus taking the ward, increasing their share from 28% to 57%
