= Thaba Chweu Local Municipality elections =

The Thaba Chweu Local Municipality is a Local Municipality in Mpumalanga in South Africa. The council consists of twenty-seven members elected by mixed-member proportional representation. Fourteen councillors are elected by first-past-the-post voting in fourteen wards, while the remaining thirteen are chosen from party lists so that the total number of party representatives is proportional to the number of votes received. In the election of 1 November 2021 the African National Congress (ANC) won a majority of sixteen seats.

== Results ==
The following table shows the composition of the council after past elections.

Event	ANC	DA	EFF	FF+	PAC	Other	Total
2000 election	18	4	—	—	—	1	23
2006 election	18	3	—	1	1	0	23
2011 election	20	6	—	0	1	0	27
2016 election	17	7	2	0	0	1	27
2021 election	16	6	3	1	0	1	27

== December 2000 election ==
The following table shows the results of the 2000 election.

Party	Ward			List			Total seats
Party	Votes	%	Seats	Votes	%	Seats	Total seats
African National Congress	13,489	78.82	11	13,599	79.27	7	18
Democratic Alliance	3,049	17.82	1	2,957	17.24	3	4
United Democratic Movement	576	3.37	0	600	3.50	1	1
Total	17,114	100.00	12	17,156	100.00	11	23
Valid votes	17,114	97.79		17,156	97.98		
Invalid/blank votes	386	2.21		354	2.02		
Total votes	17,500	100.00		17,510	100.00		
Registered voters/turnout	37,045	47.24		37,045	47.27		

== March 2006 election ==
The following table shows the results of the 2006 election.

Party	Ward			List			Total seats
Party	Votes	%	Seats	Votes	%	Seats	Total seats
African National Congress	13,797	76.61	11	13,827	76.59	7	18
Democratic Alliance	2,655	14.74	1	2,744	15.20	2	3
Freedom Front Plus	672	3.73	0	711	3.94	1	1
Pan Africanist Congress of Azania	689	3.83	0	580	3.21	1	1
Independent Democrats	197	1.09	0	191	1.06	0	0
Total	18,010	100.00	12	18,053	100.00	11	23
Valid votes	18,010	98.36		18,053	98.28		
Invalid/blank votes	301	1.64		316	1.72		
Total votes	18,311	100.00		18,369	100.00		
Registered voters/turnout	41,720	43.89		41,720	44.03		

== May 2011 election ==
The following table shows the results of the 2011 election.

Party	Ward			List			Total seats
Party	Votes	%	Seats	Votes	%	Seats	Total seats
African National Congress	16,998	71.16	12	17,686	74.05	8	20
Democratic Alliance	4,781	20.02	2	4,766	19.95	4	6
Pan Africanist Congress of Azania	361	1.51	0	445	1.86	1	1
Freedom Front Plus	421	1.76	0	366	1.53	0	0
Congress of the People	359	1.50	0	377	1.58	0	0
Independent candidates	710	2.97	0				0
African People's Convention	257	1.08	0	244	1.02	0	0
Total	23,887	100.00	14	23,884	100.00	13	27
Valid votes	23,887	97.97		23,884	97.85		
Invalid/blank votes	495	2.03		524	2.15		
Total votes	24,382	100.00		24,408	100.00		
Registered voters/turnout	45,624	53.44		45,624	53.50		

== August 2016 election ==
The following table shows the results of the 2016 election.

Party	Ward			List			Total seats
Party	Votes	%	Seats	Votes	%	Seats	Total seats
African National Congress	16,722	61.72	11	17,000	62.35	6	17
Democratic Alliance	6,556	24.20	3	6,606	24.23	4	7
Economic Freedom Fighters	1,963	7.25	0	2,016	7.39	2	2
Bushbuckridge Residents Association	459	1.69	0	763	2.80	1	1
Freedom Front Plus	463	1.71	0	487	1.79	0	0
Independent candidates	515	1.90	0				0
African People's Convention	143	0.53	0	132	0.48	0	0
Pan Africanist Congress of Azania	103	0.38	0	97	0.36	0	0
Congress of the People	99	0.37	0	72	0.26	0	0
African Christian Democratic Party	71	0.26	0	94	0.34	0	0
Total	27,094	100.00	14	27,267	100.00	13	27
Valid votes	27,094	97.79		27,267	98.47		
Invalid/blank votes	613	2.21		425	1.53		
Total votes	27,707	100.00		27,692	100.00		
Registered voters/turnout	51,549	53.75		51,549	53.72		

== November 2021 election ==
The following table shows the results of the 2021 election.

Party	Ward			List			Total seats
Party	Votes	%	Seats	Votes	%	Seats	Total seats
African National Congress	12,552	58.05	12	12,699	58.61	4	16
Democratic Alliance	4,744	21.94	2	4,730	21.83	4	6
Economic Freedom Fighters	2,435	11.26	0	2,570	11.86	3	3
Freedom Front Plus	773	3.57	0	793	3.66	1	1
African Unified Movement	300	1.39	0	282	1.30	1	1
African Christian Democratic Party	281	1.30	0	270	1.25	0	0
Independent candidates	305	1.41	0				0
African People's Convention	115	0.53	0	84	0.39	0	0
Power of Africans Unity	95	0.44	0	95	0.44	0	0
Pan Africanist Congress of Azania	11	0.05	0	66	0.30	0	0
African Transformation Movement	10	0.05	0	38	0.18	0	0
Better Residents Association	2	0.01	0	41	0.19	0	0
Total	21,623	100.00	14	21,668	100.00	13	27
Valid votes	21,623	98.47		21,668	98.38		
Invalid/blank votes	337	1.53		357	1.62		
Total votes	21,960	100.00		22,025	100.00		
Registered voters/turnout	50,959	43.09		50,959	43.22		

=== By-elections from November 2021 ===
The following by-elections were held to fill vacant ward seats in the period since November 2021.

Date	Ward	Party of the previous councillor	Party of the newly elected councillor
16 Mar 2022	6	African National Congress	African Unified Movement
25 Oct 2023	6	African Unified Movement	African National Congress
18 Jun 2025	6	African National Congress	African National Congress

After the March 2022 by-election, the council was reconfigured as below, before returning to its 2021 makeup after the October 2023 by-election:

Party	Seats		
Party	Ward	List	Total
African National Congress	11	4	15
Democratic Alliance	2	4	6
Economic Freedom Fighters	0	3	3
African Unified Movement	1	1	2
Freedom Front Plus	0	1	1
Total	14	13	27
