= Cathy Dlamini =

South African politician (born 1962)

Cathy Dlamini MPL

Member of the Mpumalanga Provincial Legislature
- Incumbent
- Assumed office June 2024

Member of the Mpumalanga Executive Council for Education
- In office June 2024 – 15 July 2025
- Premier: Mandla Ndlovu
- Preceded by: Bonakele Majuba
- Succeeded by: Lindi Masina

Mayor of City of Mbombela
- In office 2011–2014
- Preceded by: Lassy Chiwayo
- Succeeded by: Sibusiso Mathonsi

Personal details
- Born: 8 January 1962 (age 64) Mpumalanga, South Africa
- Citizenship: South African
- Party: African National Congress

Landulile Cathrine Dlamini (born 8 January 1962) is a South African politician who currently serves as Member of the Legislature in the Mpumalanga Province and the former MEC for the Department of Education. She is also the former mayor of the City of Mbombela

Dlamini served as councillor for the Ehlanzeni District Municipality from 2006 and had served as mayor of the then Greater Malalane Local Municipality which governed Malalane, Hectorspuit and KaMhlushwa. In 2011, she was appointed the director of evaluation and monitoring in then premier David Mabuza's office before she became the mayor for the City of Mbombela.

In 2016, Dlamini became a member of South Africa's Parliament and served in various committees, including chairing the Portfolio Committee on Social Services.

In 2018 Dlamini signalled her interests in leading the province of Mpumalanga as chairperson of the ruling African National Congress after then chairperson David Mabuza left it vacant to become the national deputy president.

She served as Member of the Mpumalanga Executive Council for Education from June 2024, appointed by current ANC provincial chairperson and Premier Mandla Ndlovu, until her dismissal on 15 July 2025 following a "performance review". Lindi Masina was appointed in her place.

== Education ==
She holds various certificates in governance and project management as well as a Degree in Social Science from the University of Western Cape. Her qualifications include -

- A Master's Certificate in Project Management from George Washington University
- An Advanced Certificates in Project management from Wits University
- An Advanced Certificate from Alberta University
- A Certificate in Leadership and Governance from Wits University
- A Certificate in Human Settlement and Infrastructure Development from Nelson Mandela University
- An Advance Certificate in Human Settlement and Infrastructure Development from the Nelson Mandela University
- A Certificate on Monitoring and Evaluation from Stellenbosch University
- A Certificate on Indicator Development from Stellenbosch University
