= Sasekani Manzini =

South African politician (born 1979)

Sasekani Manzini MPL

Mpumalanga MEC for Health
- Incumbent
- Assumed office 4 July 2018
- Premier: Refilwe Mtsweni-Tsipane
- Preceded by: Gillion Mashego

Mpumalanga MEC for Public Works, Roads and Transport
- In office 17 August 2016 – 4 July 2018
- Premier: David Mabuza; Refilwe Mtsweni-Tsipane
- Preceded by: Goodness Nhlengethwa
- Succeeded by: Gillion Mashego

Member of the Mpumalanga Provincial Legislature
- Incumbent
- Assumed office 18 February 2016

Personal details
- Born: 13 May 1979 (age 47) Madras, Transvaal Province, South Africa
- Party: African National Congress
- Parent: Sifulisi Alpheus Manzini (1938-2026) (father)
- Profession: Politician

Sasekani Janet Manzini (born 13 May 1979) is a South African politician who currently serves as the MEC for Health in the Mpumalanga provincial government, appointed in July 2018 as well as the Provincial spokesperson of the African National Congress (ANC) in Mpumalanga. She was elected to serve on the ANC's provincial executive committee (PEC) in December 2015 from the position of provincial African National Congress Youth League (ANCYL) secretary. Manzini served as the MEC for the provincial Department of Public Works, Roads and Transport from August 2016 to July 2018. She has been a member of the Mpumalanga Provincial Legislature since February 2016.

== Early life ==
Manzini was born on 13 May 1979 in the Madras Village outside Bushbuckridge in the former Transvaal Province, now Mpumalanga. She attended Orhovelani High School. She later obtained post-metric certificates in marketing and municipal governance.

== Political career ==
Manzini joined the ANC and its youth league while in her youth. She was elected a municipal councillor of the Bushbuckridge Local Municipality and served as a member of the mayoral committee (MMC). She was later elected provincial secretary of the ANC youth league in Mpumalanga.

She was sworn in as a member of the Mpumalanga Provincial Legislature in February 2016. In August 2016, Premier David Mabuza appointed her as the MEC for Public Works, Roads and Transport.

Manzini was made the new Health MEC by Premier Refilwe Mtsweni-Tsipane in July 2018 when the opposition Democratic Alliance (DA) made a string of complaints about the performance of then Health MEC Gillion Mashego, who was made the new Public Works MEC. Manzini returned to the post of Health MEC after the May 2019 South African elections when Mtsweni-Tsipane was voted to continue as Premier of Mpumalanga. Manzini was also elected to her first full term as MPL.

Following the 2024 general election, Manzini was retained as Hleath MEC by the newly elected premier Mandla Ndlovu.
