= Dumisile Nhlengethwa =

South African politician (1969–2021)

Member of the Mpumalanga Executive Council for Public Works, Roads and Transport
- In office 21 May 2014 – August 2016
- Premier: David Mabuza
- Preceded by: Dikeledi Mahlangu
- Succeeded by: Sasekani Manzini

Member of the National Assembly
- In office 6 May 2009 – 6 May 2014

Personal details
- Born: 4 July 1969
- Died: 24 May 2021 (aged 51)
- Citizenship: South Africa
- Party: African National Congress

Dumisile Goodness Nhlengethwa (4 July 1969 – 24 May 2021) was a South African politician who served as Mpumalanga's Member of the Executive Council (MEC) for Public Works, Roads and Transport from May 2014 to August 2016. Prior to her time in the Mpumalanga Provincial Legislature, she represented the African National Congress (ANC) in the National Assembly from 2009 to 2014.

Nhlengethwa left the provincial legislature in August 2016 to serve as a local councillor in Msukaligwa Local Municipality, where she was elected Speaker. At the time of her death in 2021, she was serving as a councillor in the Gert Sibande District Municipality.

== Early life ==
Nhlengethwa was born on 4 July 1969.

== Career in government ==
In the 2009 general election, Nhlengethwa was elected to represent the ANC in the National Assembly, the lower house of the South African Parliament, where she served for a full legislative term and chaired the Portfolio Committee on Cooperative Governance and Traditional Affairs.

In the next general election in 2014, she was ranked 22nd on the ANC's provincial party list and was elected to a seat in the Mpumalanga Provincial Legislature. After the election, Mpumalanga Premier David Mabuza appointed her to the Mpumalanga Executive Council as a Member of the Executive Council (MEC) for Public Works, Roads and Transport. She served in that position for less than three years: she stood as a candidate in the August 2016 local elections, pursuant to which she was elected Speaker of the Msukaligwa Local Municipality. She vacated her seat in the provincial legislature in order to take up the post, which the ANC denied was a demotion; her former portfolio in the Executive Council was taken up by Sasekani Manzini.

After a period as Msukaligwa Speaker, Nhlengethwa became a councillor in the Gert Sibande District Municipality, where she served as a Member of the Mayoral Committee at the time of her death in 2021.

== Death ==
Nhlengethwa died on 24 May 2021, aged 51.
