= Madras, Mpumalanga =

Madras
- Location within Mpumalanga Location within South Africa
- Coordinates: 24.991°S 31.156°E
- Country: South Africa
- Province: Mpumalanga
- District: Ehlanzeni
- Municipality: Bushbuckridge

Area
  - Total: 5.29 km^{2} (2.04 sq mi)

Population (2011)
  - Total: 6,635
  - Density: 1,250/km^{2} (3,250/sq mi)

Racial makeup (2011)
  - Black African: 99.8%
  - Other: 0.1%

First languages (2011)
  - Swazi: 55.0%
  - Tsonga: 26.2%
  - Zulu: 8.5%
  - Sotho: 7.2%
  - Other: 3.1%
- Time zone: UTC+2 (SAST)
- PO box: 1258

Madras is a town in Ehlanzeni District Municipality in the Mpumalanga province of South Africa.
