= Emalahleni Local Municipality, Mpumalanga elections =

The Emalahleni Local Municipality is a Local Municipality in Mpumalanga in South Africa. The council consists of sixty-eight members elected by mixed-member proportional representation. Thirty-four councillors are elected by first-past-the-post voting in thirty-four wards, while the remaining thirty-four are chosen from party lists so that the total number of party representatives is proportional to the number of votes received. In the election of 1 November 2021 the African National Congress (ANC) won a majority of thirty-five seats.

== Results ==
The following table shows the composition of the council after past elections.

Event	ACDP	ANC	DA	EFF	FF+	PAC	Other	Total
2000 election	1	47	15	—	—	1	0	64
2006 election	1	47	13	—	1	1	1	64
2011 election	0	49	18	—	1	0	0	68
2016 election	1	41	17	8	1	0	0	68
2021 election	1	35	13	14	4	—	1	68

== December 2000 election ==
The following table shows the results of the 2000 election.

Party	Ward			List			Total seats
Party	Votes	%	Seats	Votes	%	Seats	Total seats
African National Congress	36,813	72.25	25	37,172	72.40	22	47
Democratic Alliance	11,638	22.84	7	11,725	22.84	8	15
Pan Africanist Congress of Azania	935	1.84	0	999	1.95	1	1
African Christian Democratic Party	699	1.37	0	797	1.55	1	1
Independent candidates	673	1.32	0				0
Inkatha Freedom Party	174	0.34	0	421	0.82	0	0
United Democratic Movement	19	0.04	0	228	0.44	0	0
Total	50,951	100.00	32	51,342	100.00	32	64
Valid votes	50,951	97.88		51,342	98.26		
Invalid/blank votes	1,103	2.12		908	1.74		
Total votes	52,054	100.00		52,250	100.00		
Registered voters/turnout	129,380	40.23		129,380	40.38		

== March 2006 election ==
The following table shows the results of the 2006 election.

Party	Ward			List			Total seats
Party	Votes	%	Seats	Votes	%	Seats	Total seats
African National Congress	44,509	72.54	27	44,943	73.55	20	47
Democratic Alliance	12,111	19.74	5	12,092	19.79	8	13
African Christian Democratic Party	1,017	1.66	0	964	1.58	1	1
Freedom Front Plus	995	1.62	0	923	1.51	1	1
Pan Africanist Congress of Azania	722	1.18	0	706	1.16	1	1
Azanian People's Organisation	488	0.80	0	778	1.27	1	1
Independent candidates	1,085	1.77	0				0
Inkatha Freedom Party	240	0.39	0	311	0.51	0	0
United Independent Front	170	0.28	0	239	0.39	0	0
National Democratic Convention	24	0.04	0	150	0.25	0	0
Total	61,361	100.00	32	61,106	100.00	32	64
Valid votes	61,361	97.96		61,106	97.57		
Invalid/blank votes	1,280	2.04		1,523	2.43		
Total votes	62,641	100.00		62,629	100.00		
Registered voters/turnout	149,252	41.97		149,252	41.96		

== May 2011 election ==
The following table shows the results of the 2011 election.

Party	Ward			List			Total seats
Party	Votes	%	Seats	Votes	%	Seats	Total seats
African National Congress	62,664	70.82	28	63,587	71.63	21	49
Democratic Alliance	22,572	25.51	6	22,404	25.24	12	18
Freedom Front Plus	785	0.89	0	677	0.76	1	1
Congress of the People	341	0.39	0	453	0.51	0	0
Independent candidates	723	0.82	0				0
Azanian People's Organisation	300	0.34	0	392	0.44	0	0
African People's Convention	293	0.33	0	394	0.44	0	0
African Christian Democratic Party	352	0.40	0	296	0.33	0	0
Pan Africanist Congress of Azania	261	0.29	0	289	0.33	0	0
African Christian Alliance-Afrikaner Christen Alliansie	159	0.18	0	122	0.14	0	0
National Freedom Party	30	0.03	0	159	0.18	0	0
Total	88,480	100.00	34	88,773	100.00	34	68
Valid votes	88,480	98.77		88,773	98.84		
Invalid/blank votes	1,105	1.23		1,046	1.16		
Total votes	89,585	100.00		89,819	100.00		
Registered voters/turnout	167,689	53.42		167,689	53.56		

== August 2016 election ==
The following table shows the results of the 2016 election.

Party	Ward			List			Total seats
Party	Votes	%	Seats	Votes	%	Seats	Total seats
African National Congress	57,194	59.55	26	57,171	59.57	15	41
Democratic Alliance	24,471	25.48	8	24,367	25.39	9	17
Economic Freedom Fighters	11,340	11.81	0	11,741	12.23	8	8
Freedom Front Plus	1,393	1.45	0	1,458	1.52	1	1
African Christian Democratic Party	511	0.53	0	517	0.54	1	1
Independent candidates	683	0.71	0				0
Pan Africanist Congress of Azania	307	0.32	0	261	0.27	0	0
African People's Convention	33	0.03	0	378	0.39	0	0
Sindawonye Progressive Party	106	0.11	0	75	0.08	0	0
Total	96,038	100.00	34	95,968	100.00	34	68
Valid votes	96,038	98.41		95,968	98.22		
Invalid/blank votes	1,556	1.59		1,739	1.78		
Total votes	97,594	100.00		97,707	100.00		
Registered voters/turnout	189,524	51.49		189,524	51.55		

== November 2021 election ==
The following table shows the results of the 2021 election.

Party	Ward			List			Total seats
Party	Votes	%	Seats	Votes	%	Seats	Total seats
African National Congress	36,302	50.33	28	36,665	50.83	7	35
Economic Freedom Fighters	14,536	20.15	0	14,994	20.79	14	14
Democratic Alliance	13,276	18.41	6	13,198	18.30	7	13
Freedom Front Plus	4,039	5.60	0	3,944	5.47	4	4
Independent candidates	1,778	2.46	0				0
African Independent Congress	614	0.85	0	780	1.08	1	1
African Christian Democratic Party	664	0.92	0	635	0.88	1	1
African People's Convention	246	0.34	0	472	0.65	0	0
United Independent Movement	244	0.34	0	334	0.46	0	0
African Transformation Movement	141	0.20	0	288	0.40	0	0
Patriotic Alliance	115	0.16	0	232	0.32	0	0
Inkatha Freedom Party	4	0.01	0	309	0.43	0	0
Defenders of the People	79	0.11	0	102	0.14	0	0
Africa Restoration Alliance	78	0.11	0	30	0.04	0	0
Azanian People's Organisation	10	0.01	0	67	0.09	0	0
Abantu Batho Congress	6	0.01	0	59	0.08	0	0
African Basic Republicans				28	0.04	0	0
Total	72,132	100.00	34	72,137	100.00	34	68
Valid votes	72,132	98.22		72,137	98.10		
Invalid/blank votes	1,307	1.78		1,398	1.90		
Total votes	73,439	100.00		73,535	100.00		
Registered voters/turnout	186,763	39.32		186,763	39.37		

=== By-elections from November 2021 ===
The following by-elections were held to fill vacant ward seats in the period since the election in November 2021.

Date	Ward	Party of the previous councillor	Party of the newly elected councillor
23 Oct 2024	24	Democratic Alliance	Democratic Alliance
1 Oct 2025	26	African National Congress	Democratic Alliance
