= Dumisani Mthenjane =

South African politician

Member of the South African National Assembly
- In office 22 May 2019 – 1 June 2023
- Succeeded by: Nqobile Mhlongo

Personal details
- Born: Dumisani Fannie Mthenjane
- Party: Economic Freedom Fighters

Dumisani Fannie Mthenjane is a South African politician. A member of the Economic Freedom Fighters, he was elected to the National Assembly in May 2019. Mthenjane served as a member of the Portfolio Committee on Small Business Development.

On 6 June 2023, News24 reported that Mthenjane had been fired as a Member of the National Assembly by the EFF.
