= Dennilton =

- Location within Limpopo Location within South Africa
- Coordinates: 25.256°S 29.164°E
- Country: South Africa
- Province: Limpopo
- District: Sekhukhune
- Municipality: Elias Motsoaledi

Area
  - Total: 10.88 km^{2} (4.20 sq mi)

Population (2011)
  - Total: 2,408
  - Density: 221.3/km^{2} (573.2/sq mi)

Racial makeup (2011)
  - Black African: 99.5%
  - Indian/Asian: 0.2%
  - White: 0.2%
  - Other: 0.1%

First languages (2011)
  - Zulu: 46.2%
  - Northern Sotho: 22.5%
  - S. Ndebele: 9.4%
  - Tsonga: 8.3%
  - Other: 13.5%
- Time zone: UTC+2 (SAST)
- Postal code (street): 1030
- PO box: 1030
- Area code: 013

Dennilton is a town in Sekhukhune District Municipality in the Limpopo province of South Africa.

The town, which consists of 99.5% of Black residents, lies on the provincial border with Mpumalanga and many travel to their places of work in Gauteng on a daily basis. Before the town was incorporated into Limpopo it was part of Mpumalanga Province. The town is along the R25 road between Bronkhorstspruit and Groblersdal.
