= Cefups Academy =

Coordinates: 25°24′23″S 30°59′26″E

- Nelspruit (Mbombela), Mpumalanga; South Africa

Information
- Type: Private, Boarding
- Motto: A private college with a difference
- Established: 1992
- Founder: Dr Simon Mkhatshwa
- Locale: Suburban
- Principal: Pasipanodya Rumbidzai
- Grades: 7–12
- Colors: Maroon, Grey and White
- Boarding Master: Mjokhi Jaconia Dlamini
- Website: www.cefups.co.za

Cefups Academy is a private and boarding high school in Nelspruit in Mpumalanga, South Africa founded by Dr Simon Mkhatshwa.
