= Bongani Bongo =

South African politician (born 1978)

The Honourable Bongani Bongo MP
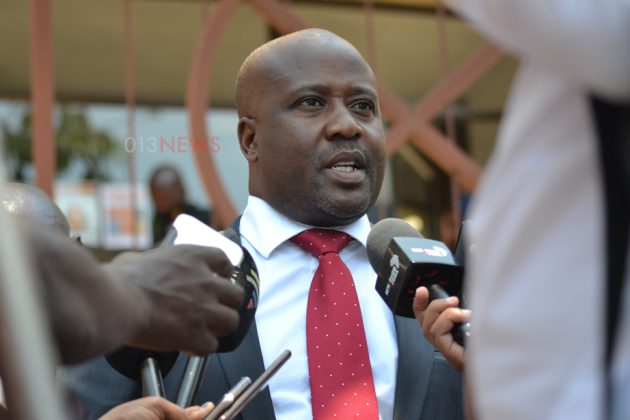
- Bongo in October 2020

Minister of State Security
- In office 17 October 2017 – 28 February 2018
- President: Jacob Zuma
- Preceded by: David Mahlobo
- Succeeded by: Dipuo Letsatsi-Duba

Chairperson of Parliament's portfolio committee on Home Affairs
- In office July 2019 – August 2021

President of the University of Limpopo's Alumni and Convocation Association
- In office 2016–2022
- Succeeded by: Donald Selamolela

Personal details
- Born: 29 June 1978 (age 47) Dennilton, Limpopo, South Africa
- Relations: Thomas Bongo (b.1939-d.2002; (father); Emily Makhanya (b.1950- ; (mother); Joel Bongo (brother)
- Education: University of Limpopo
- Profession: Politician, lawyer

Bongani Thomas Bongo (born 29 June 1978) is a South African politician and the former Minister of State Security, a position to which he was appointed on 17 October 2017 by President Jacob Zuma until he was relieved from the post on 28 February 2018 by President Cyril Ramaphosa. He was the only appointment that had not been a cabinet minister before. He served as President of the University of Limpopo's Alumni and Convocation Association between 2016 and 2022, and became its emiratus president soon after that. As the Minister of State Security, Bongo headed the State Security Agency of South Africa.

A lawyer and ANC politician from Mpumalanga, Bongo was elected to the National Assembly in the May 2014 national elections. He actively contributed to several parliamentary committees, including the Constitutional Review Committee, which examined possible amendments to Section 25 of the South African Constitution. Additionally, he played a role in the ad hoc committees tasked with amending Section 25 and selecting Busisiwe Mkhwebane as Public Protector.

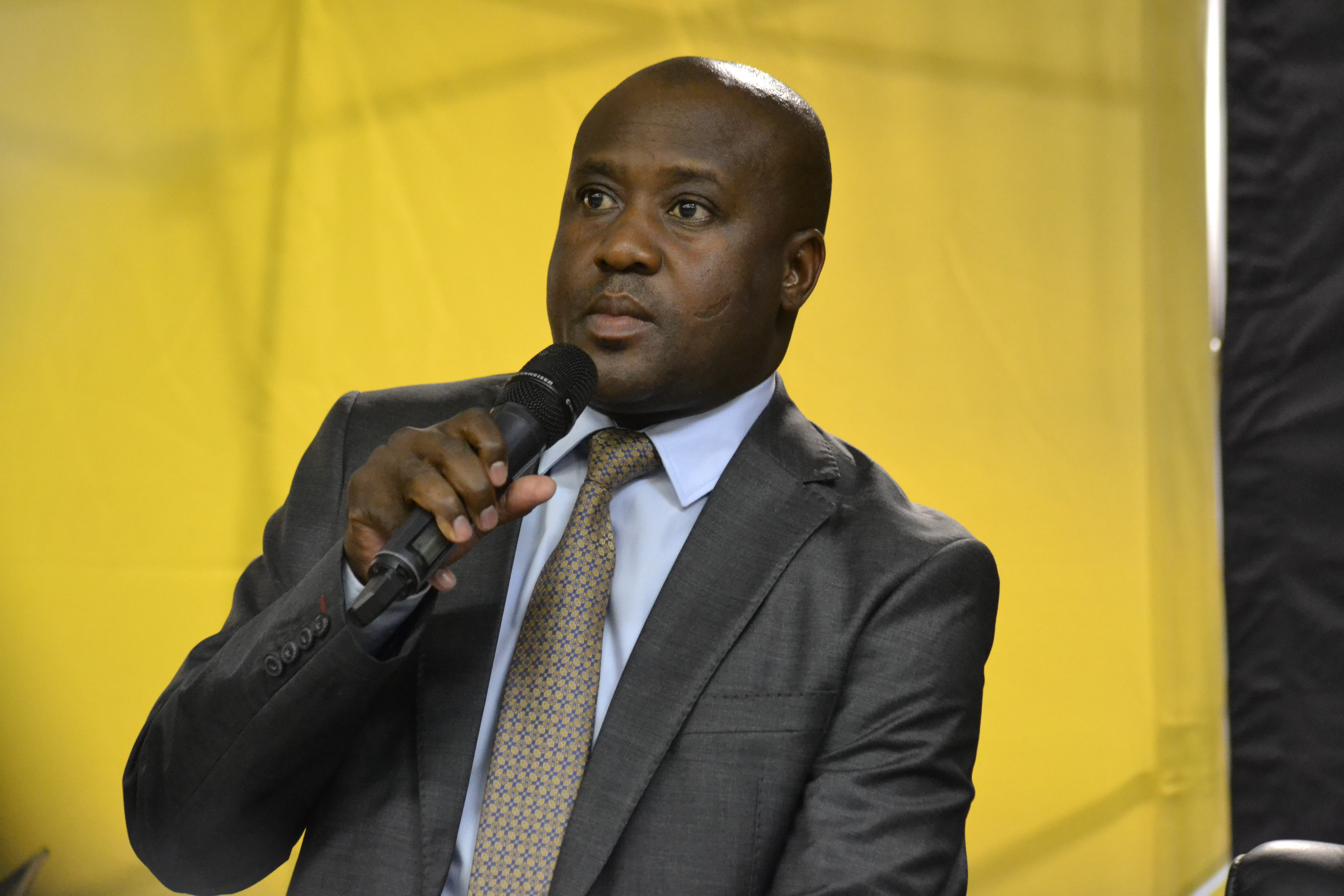
Bongani Bongo chairing a Parliament's public hearing in Mbombela on 28 February 2020

On 2 July 2019, Bongo was elected chairperson of Parliament’s Portfolio Committee on Home Affairs, securing the position despite opposition from political rivals. His nomination, put forward by ANC MP Musa Chabangu and seconded by Tidimalo Legwase, was ultimately successful against the DA’s proposed candidate, Angel Khanyile.

Bongo’s tenure as chairperson ended in August 2021 when the African National Congress made changes to its parliamentary leadership. His removal was part of a broader restructuring within the party, reflecting shifts in internal political dynamics. As a known ally of former president Jacob Zuma, Bongo’s departure was viewed by some as linked to the ongoing reconfiguration of power within the ANC under President Cyril Ramaphosa.

== Early life ==
Bongo was born on 29 June 1978 in Dennilton, a town now part of Limpopo's Sekhukhune District Municipality and situated near the provincial border with Mpumalanga. He matriculated from Kgothala Secondary School. He is the third of five children born to Thomas Bongo and Emily Makhanya. In 1999, his family relocated permanently to the township of Siyabuswa, in Mpumalanga's Dr JS Moroka Local Municipality, while he was pursuing a law degree at the University of Limpopo.

During his university years, Bongo was active in student politics. He became a member of the South African Student Congress (SASCO) and served as president of the Students' Representative Council (SRC) from 2001 to 2002. His political involvement continued beyond university when he was elected chairperson of the African National Congress Youth League (ANCYL) in Dennilton, serving from 2003 to 2004. He later advanced to the Nkangala region ANCYL executive and ultimately to the provincial executive of the ANCYL in Mpumalanga.

== 2017 Zimbabwean coup ==
On 15 November 2017, Bongo and South African defense minister Nosiviwe Mapisa-Nqakula arrived in Harare as President Jacob Zuma's special envoys to Zimbabwe's 2017 coup that deposed Robert Mugabe

Zuma had dispatched them in his capacity as chairperson of the Southern African Development Community (SADC) to hold talks between Mugabe and generals from the Zimbabwe Defence Force (ZDF) who finally seized power from Mugabe's almost four-decade rule.

When they arrived at the Harare International Airport they were not allowed to leave the airport until the evening, when they were allowed to move to a hotel. On Thursday, 16 November, Mugabe was at Harare's State House to participate in talks with General Constantino Chiwenga, Bongo and Mapisa-Nqakula over a transition of power.

Later Bongo and Mapisa-Nqakula met with Angolan president João Lourenço, who was chairperson of the SADC's Organ on Politics, Defence and Security, to brief him on the Zimbabwean situation

== Parliament's Section 25 Committee ==
Bongo played a leadership role in Parliament's ad hoc committee established in July 2019 to amend Section 25 of the South African Constitution. The committee, formally known as the Ad Hoc Committee to Initiate and Introduce Legislation Amending Section 25 of the Constitution, was tasked with clarifying the constitutional framework for expropriation of land without compensation as a legitimate option for land reform.

The 24-member committee elected Mathole Motshekga as chairperson. However, during public hearings held across the country between February and March 2020, the committee divided into two groups to expedite the process - one led by Bongo and the other by Motshekga.

The formation of the committee stemmed from a 2018 report by the Constitutional Review Committee, which recommended amending Section 25 to make explicit what was already considered implicit regarding land expropriation without compensation. The proposal aimed to address historical land dispossession and ensure equitable access to land for South Africans. However, the recommendation faced resistance, with the Democratic Alliance (DA) dismissing it as a "complete farce."

The ad hoc committee subsequently conducted nationwide public hearings, engaging citizens on how the legislation should be worded to facilitate land expropriation without compensation.

== Criminal accusations ==
Bongani Bongo was accused of attempting to bribe Ntuthuzelo Vanara, the evidence leader in Parliament’s inquiry into state capture at Eskom. In an affidavit to Speaker Baleka Mbete, Vanara claimed that Bongo approached him on behalf of acting Eskom board chairperson Zethembe Khoza and offered what Vanara described as “a blank cheque” to halt the committee’s investigation. Mbete referred the matter to Parliament’s joint ethics committee for further scrutiny.

Following these allegations, Bongo was arrested in Cape Town on 21 November 2019 and charged with corruption. However, on 26 February 2021, Judge John Hlophe of the Western Cape High Court dismissed the case after Bongo’s legal team successfully argued a section 174 application. This provision of South African law allows for charges to be withdrawn if a court determines that the state has not presented sufficient evidence to reasonably secure a conviction. The ruling effectively cleared Bongo of any wrongdoing in the matter.

Bongo was also implicated in a separate Hawks investigation into alleged irregular land transactions during his tenure as a legal adviser in the Mpumalanga human settlements department. He, along with several government officials, a lawyer, and businessmen, was arrested in Nelspruit and initially faced over 60 counts of fraud and corruption. Among those implicated were senior government official David Dube and Bongo’s younger brother, Joel Bongo, who was accused of receiving two luxury vehicles from businessmen involved in government land deals.

Despite the initial number of charges, Bongo ultimately faced only three counts of fraud and corruption. In June 2023, at the start of the trial, the state dropped two of these charges due to a lack of evidence linking him to the alleged offenses. On the same day, all charges against his brother Joel were also withdrawn. In May 2024, Bongo and four co-accused were fully acquitted of all remaining charges.

In 2025, Bongo lodged a R38.2 million civil claim against the state, citing wrongful arrest, emotional trauma, reputational harm and loss of income. The lawsuit relates to his 2019 arrest in the bribery case, which was initially dismissed in 2021 but has since been reinstated in February 2025 and which Bongo described as a political witch hunt aimed at further tarnishing his name.
