= Better Residents Association =

Political party in South Africa

- President: Delta Mokoena
- Split from: African National Congress
- Ideology: Localism
- National Assembly seats: 0 / 400

Website
- www.facebook.com/Better-Residents-Association-BRA-553564971814057/

The Better Residents Association is a minor South African political party formed by disgruntled African National Congress members in 2011. Initially formed as the Bushbuckridge Residents Association, the party changed its name in order to contest elections in all provinces.

== Vigilantism ==
In February 2017, the party's president, Delta Mokoena, began a 10-year prison sentence for vigilantism. He was convicted in 2013 of threatening to burn a resident and his house if the man, whom he accused of having a thief as a son, did not leave the area.

The party has been accused of 'causing a reign of terror', making use of kangaroo courts, torturing suspected criminals, and banishing residents it accused of being witches or Satanists.

== Public representatives ==
Cleopas Maunye served as the party's sole representative in the provincial legislature until he was recalled from the legislature in March 2017. Cecil Shilakwe was appointed his successor.

== Election results ==
The party won its first seats at local government level in the 2011 municipal elections, and after the 2016 municipal elections holds seats in the Bushbuckridge and Bela-Bela local municipalities.

The party also won one seat in the Mpumalanga Provincial Legislature in the 2014 general election, although it lost it in the 2019 election.

In December 2020, the party lost three of its 14 seats in the Bushbuckridge Local Municipality after it expelled three of its ward councillors, and did not contest the resulting by-elections.

=== National elections ===
Election	Total votes	Share of vote	Seats	+/–	Government
2014	15,271	0.08%	0 / 400	±0	extraparliamentary
2019	9,179	0.05%	0 / 400	±0	extraparliamentary

=== Provincial elections ===
Election	Eastern Cape		Free State		Gauteng		Kwazulu-Natal		Limpopo		Mpumalanga		North-West		Northern Cape		Western Cape	
Election	%	Seats	%	Seats	%	Seats	%	Seats	%	Seats	%	Seats	%	Seats	%	Seats	%	Seats
2014	-	-	-	-	-	-	-	-	-	-	1.15%	1/30	-	-	-	-	-	-
2019	-	-	-	-	0.01	0/73	-	-	0.04	0/49	0.72%	0/30	-	-	-	-	-	-

=== Municipal elections ===
Election	Votes	%
2016	73,468	0.19%
