= 2019 Mpumalanga provincial election =

Provincial election

← 2014	8 May 2019	2024 →

All 30 seats to the Mpumalanga Provincial Legislature 16 seats needed for a majority
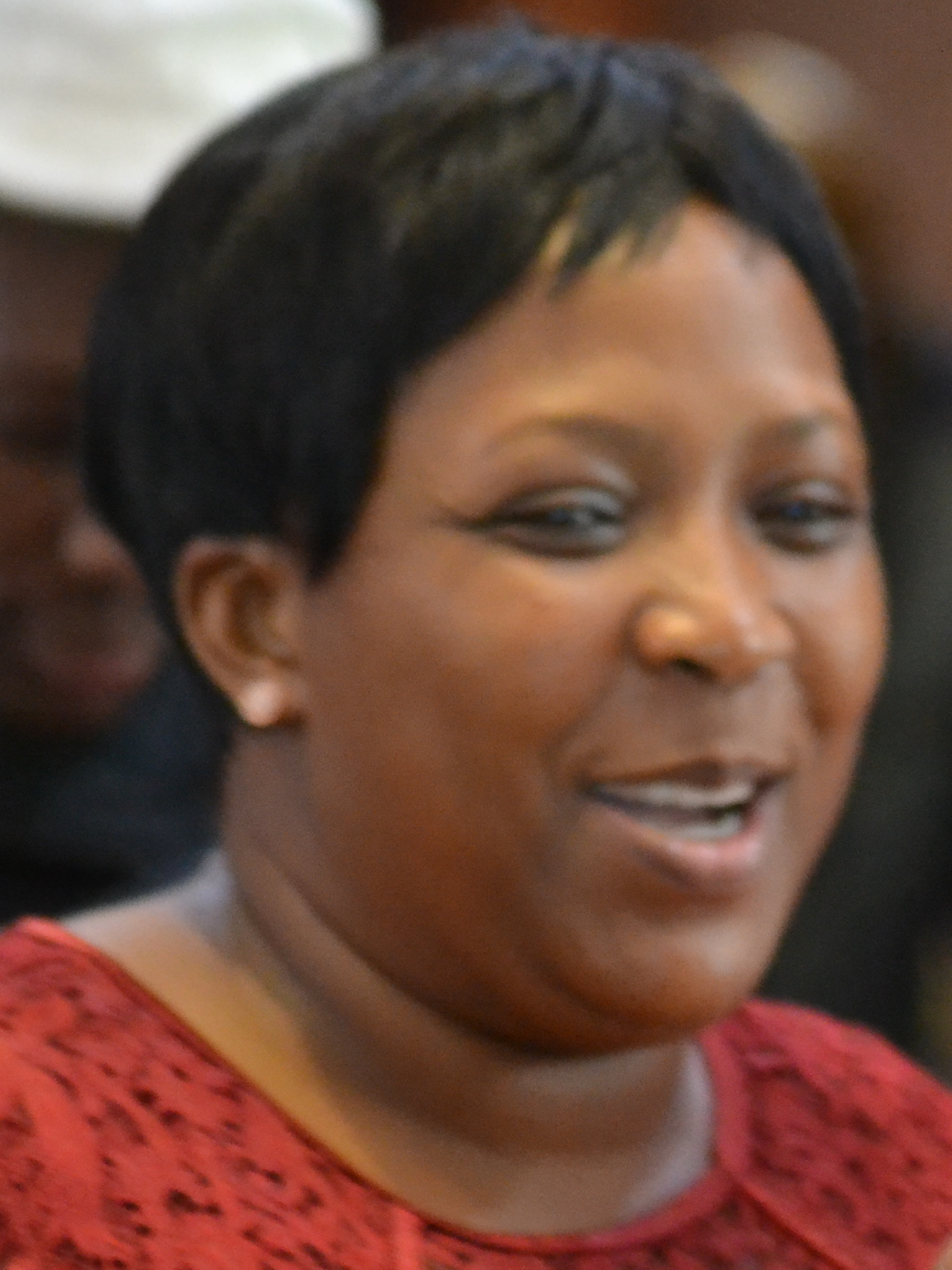

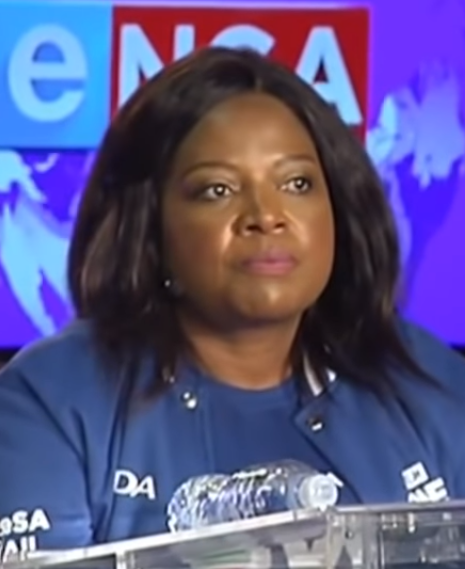

	First party	Second party
Candidate	Refilwe Mtsweni-Tsipane	Collen Sedibe
Party	ANC	EFF
Last election	78.23%	6.26%
Seats before	24	2
Seats won	22	4
Seat change	▼2	▲2
Popular vote	858,589	155,573
Percentage	70.58%	12.79%
Swing	▼7.65%	▲6.53%
	Third party	Fourth party
Candidate	Jane Sithole	Werner Weber
Party	DA	VF+
Last election	10.40%	0.82%
Seats before	3	0
Seats won	3	1
Seat change	0	▲1
Popular vote	118,915	29,512
Percentage	9.77%	2.43%
Swing	▼0.63%	▲1.61%
Premier before election
Refilwe Mtsweni-Tsipane
African National Congress
Elected Premier
Refilwe Mtsweni-Tsipane
African National Congress

The 2019 Mpumalanga provincial election was held on 8 May 2019 to elect the 30 members of the Mpumalanga Provincial Legislature. It was held on the same day as the 2019 South African general election. The election was won by the African National Congress, the incumbent governing party in the province.

Incumbent Premier Refilwe Mtsweni-Tsipane of the African National Congress was elected to her first full term after the election.

== Premier candidates ==
Prior to the election, the incumbent governing party in the province, the African National Congress (ANC), did not announce a premier candidate. Incumbent premier Refilwe Mtsweni-Tsipane was first on the party's provincial candidate list for the election. She was announced as the party's premier candidate following the election.

Democratic Alliance (DA) provincial leader and member of the provincial legislature Jane Sithole was announced as the DA's premier candidate. She was also first on the party's list.

The Economic Freedom Fighters (EFF) did not field a premier candidate since the party seeks to abolish provincial governments. EFF provincial chair Collen Sedibe was first on the party's provincial candidate list.

The Freedom Front Plus nominated its provincial leader Werner Weber as its premier candidate.

== Results ==
Party	Votes	%	+/–	Seats	+/–
African National Congress	858,589	70.58	–7.65	22	–2
Economic Freedom Fighters	155,573	12.79	+6.53	4	+2
Democratic Alliance	118,915	9.77	–0.63	3	0
Freedom Front Plus	29,512	2.43	+1.61	1	+1
Better Residents Association	8,816	0.72	–0.43	0	–1
African Transformation Movement	7,468	0.61	New	0	New
African Christian Democratic Party	6,183	0.51	+0.11	0	0
African Independent Congress	4,376	0.36	New	0	New
African People's Convention	4,083	0.34	–0.10	0	0
Inkatha Freedom Party	3,750	0.31	+0.05	0	0
South African National Congress of Traditional Authorities	2,884	0.24	New	0	New
Agang South Africa	1,828	0.15	+0.02	0	0
Congress of the People	1,819	0.15	–0.17	0	0
Socialist Revolutionary Workers Party	1,814	0.15	New	0	New
Pan Africanist Congress	1,683	0.14	–0.09	0	0
National Freedom Party	1,430	0.12	–0.63	0	0
Sindawonye Progressive Party	1,205	0.10	–0.22	0	0
Black First Land First	1,097	0.09	New	0	New
Forum for Service Delivery	949	0.08	New	0	New
United Democratic Movement	917	0.08	–0.05	0	0
Good	673	0.06	New	0	New
African Covenant	541	0.04	New	0	New
Azanian People's Organisation	526	0.04	–0.05	0	0
Alliance for Transformation for All	513	0.04	New	0	New
Residence Association of South Africa	489	0.04	New	0	New
International Revelation Congress	441	0.04	New	0	New
African Content Movement	323	0.03	New	0	New
Zenzeleni Progressive Movement	125	0.01	New	0	New
Total	1,216,522	100.00	–	30	0
Valid votes	1,216,522	98.62			
Invalid/blank votes	17,022	1.38			
Total votes	1,233,544	100.00			
Registered voters/turnout	1,951,776	63.20			
Source: Election Resources
