= Refilwe Mtsweni-Tsipane =

7th Chairperson of the National Council of Provinces (since 2024)

The Honourable Refilwe Mtsweni-Tsipane MP
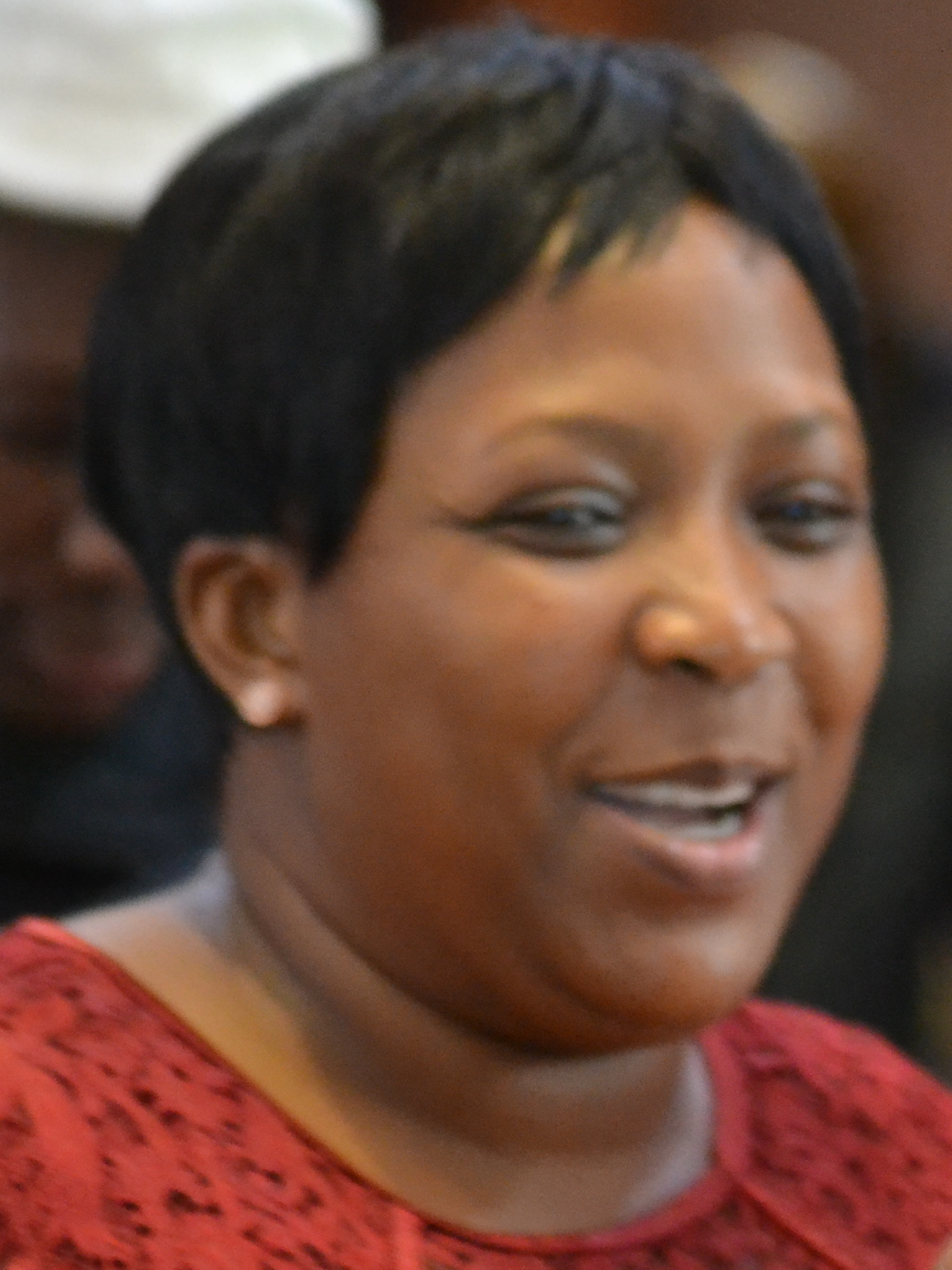
- Mtsweni-Tsipane in 2020

7th Chairperson of the National Council of Provinces
- Incumbent
- Assumed office 15 June 2024
- Deputy: Les Govender
- Preceded by: Amos Masondo

5th Premier of Mpumalanga
- In office 20 March 2018 – 18 June 2024 (Acting: 1 March 2018 – 20 March 2018)
- Preceded by: David Mabuza
- Succeeded by: Mandla Ndlovu

Member of the Mpumalanga Executive Council for Cooperative Governance and Traditional Affairs
- In office 30 May 2014 – 27 February 2018
- Premier: David Mabuza
- Preceded by: Simon Skhosana
- Succeeded by: Speedy Mashilo
Legislative offices
2014–present
Permanent Delegate to the National Council of Provinces
Assembly Member
for Mpumalanga
Incumbent
Assumed office
28 May 2024
Member of the Mpumalanga Provincial Legislature
In office
21 May 2014 – 28 May 2024

Personal details
- Born: Refilwe Maria Mtsweni; 3 September 1973 (age 53) Emalahleni, Transvaal; South Africa
- Party: African National Congress
- Spouse: Lawrence Tsipane
- Education: Tshwane University of Technology

Refilwe Maria Mtsweni-Tsipane (née Mtsweni; born 3 September 1973), also spelled Mtshweni-Tsipane, is a South African politician from Mpumalanga. A member of the African National Congress (ANC), she has been the Chairperson of the National Council of Provinces since June 2024. Before that, she served as the fifth Premier of Mpumalanga between 2018 and 2024.

Mtsweni-Tsipane entered government after the May 2014 general election, when Premier David Mabuza appointed her as Mpumalanga's Member of the Executive Council for Cooperative Governance and Traditional Affairs. She succeeded Mabuza as premier when he left the province to become Deputy President of South Africa in February 2018. She has been a member of the ANC's National Executive Committee since December 2022.

== Early life and career ==
Mtsweni-Tsipane was born on 3 September 1973 in Emalahleni in the former Eastern Transvaal, now part of Mpumalanga Province. She spent most of her childhood in Lynnville, Emalahleni but attended secondary school in Atteridgeville, Pretoria; she ultimately matriculated in 1990 at the Hlabirwa Commercial School in the Northern Transvaal. Thereafter she attended the Tshwane University of Technology, completing a diploma in human resource management in 1993. In later years, she completed postgraduate certifications at the University of Pretoria and the Wits Business School.

In the decades before she joined the government, Mtsweni-Tsipane rose through the local ranks of the African National Congress (ANC) in Nkangala, beginning in 1993 as chairperson of a local branch of the ANC Women's League. She was also briefly involved in the trade union movement; between 1997 and 1999, she was a shop steward for the National Union of Metalworkers. She later served in the provincial executive committee of the ANC Youth League.

== Mpumalanga Executive Council: 2014–2018 ==
In the May 2014 general election, Mtsweni-Tsipane was elected to a seat in the Mpumalanga Provincial Legislature, ranked twelfth on the ANC's provincial party list. Announcing his new Executive Council later that month, Premier David Mabuza appointed her as Member of the Executive Council (MEC) for Cooperative Governance and Traditional Affairs. The leader of the provincial opposition, Anthony Benadie of the Democratic Alliance, criticised the appointment, saying that Mtsweni-Tsipane "lacks the skill or strength of character to manage a complex portfolio".

== Premier of Mpumalanga: 2018–2024 ==
When Mabuza became Deputy President of South Africa in February 2018, Mtsweni-Tsipane was selected as acting premier. She was sworn in to the position twice: her first swearing-in, on 27 February 2018, was constitutionally invalid because it proceeded on Mabuza's instructions alone, without the official sanction of the Executive Council. She was sworn in for a second time on 1 March 2018 in Pretoria.

On 14 March 2018, the ANC announced that it would nominate Mtsweni-Tsipane to replace Mabuza permanently as the Premier of Mpumalanga. She was formally elected to the office on 20 March, becoming the first woman to hold the position. The City Press, surprised by her election, described her as "largely unknown". Nonetheless, she stood as the ANC's premier candidate in the May 2019 general election, and she was re-elected to a full term as premier on 27 May 2019.

=== COVID-19 pandemic ===
Mtsweni-Tsipane held the premiership throughout the COVID-19 pandemic, and she tested positive for COVID-19 in late September 2020. In January 2021, she was charged with violating COVID-19 protocols after she was photographed arriving at Jackson Mthembu's funeral without wearing a face mask. The incident had caused public controversy and the national Minister of Police, Bheki Cele, called for an investigation. Mtsweni-Tsipane said that she had not noticed that her mask had broken and fallen off; she apologised publicly, signed an admission of guilt, and paid a R1,500 fine.

=== ANC leadership ===
By the end of 2019, Mtsweni-Tsipane was understood to be Mabuza's favoured candidate to replace him as provincial chairperson of the Mpumalanga ANC. However, after a hostile two-year campaign, she withdrew her candidacy in February 2021. The Mail & Guardian reported that she entered into a "fragile alliance" with her former rival, Mandla Ndlovu, who was elected as provincial chairperson at a party conference in April 2022; Mtsweni-Tsipane was elected as an ordinary member of the party's Provincial Executive Committee.

In December 2022, she attended the ANC's 55th National Conference, where she was narrowly elected to a five-year term on the ANC's National Executive Committee. She received 1,008 votes across roughly 4,000 ballots, making her the 73rd-most popular member of the 80-member committee.

== National Council of Provinces: 2024–present ==
After the May 2024 general election, Mtsweni was sworn in as a permanent delegate to the National Council of Provinces (NCOP). The ANC nominated her to become chairperson of the NCOP, and she was elected to that office unopposed. Ndlovu succeeded her as premier.

== Personal life ==
She is married to Lawrence Tsipane, and she has two children.

Political offices
Preceded by Amos Masondo	7th Chairperson of the National Council of Provinces; 2024–present	Incumbent
Preceded by David Mabuza	5th Premier of Mpumalanga; 2018–2024	Succeeded by Mandla Ndlovu
