= Provincial Executive Committees of the African National Congress =

South African political body

Type
- Type: Executive organs of the nine provinces of the African National Congress

Leadership
- Free State Chairperson: Mxolisi Dukwana
- KwaZulu-Natal Chairperson: Vacant
- North West Chairperson: Nono Maloyi
- Mpumalanga Chairperson: Mandla Ndlovu
- Gauteng Chairperson: Vacant
- Limpopo Chairperson: Phophi Ramathuba
- Eastern Cape Chairperson: Vacant
- Western Cape Chairperson: Vacant
- Northern Cape Chairperson: Zamani Saul

Structure
- Seats: 35
- Length of term: 4 years
- Authority: National Executive Committee of the African National Congress

Website
- anc1912.org.za/provincial

The Provincial Executive Committees (PECs) of the African National Congress (ANC) are the chief executive organs of the party's nine provincial branches. Comprising the so-called “Top Five” provincial officials and up to 30 additional elected members, each is structured similarly to the party's National Executive Committee (NEC) and is elected every four years at party provincial conferences.

The “Top Five” officials at the head of each PEC are the ANC Provincial Chairperson, the political leader of the party in the province; the ANC Provincial Secretary, a full-time party functionary; their respective deputies; and the Provincial Treasurer. With some notable exceptions, especially under President Thabo Mbeki, the Provincial Chairperson often becomes the ANC's candidate for election as Premier in the corresponding provincial government, and other members of the PEC are often appointed to the provincial cabinet as Members of the Executive Council.

== Structure and election ==
Since its early history in the 1910s, the African National Congress (ANC) has had a quasi-federal structure, with an organisational hierarchy of local branches, regions, and provinces all falling under the overall leadership of the party's national executive. In its contemporary incarnation, the precise form of this hierarchy dates to the mid-1990s, when the party – recently unbanned by the apartheid government and returned from exile to South Africa – was restructured to align with the post-apartheid South African political system. The party therefore developed nine provincial branches which correspond to the nine provinces of South Africa. In each province, the ANC is led by a Provincial Executive Committee (PEC), which is described in the party's constitution as the party's "highest organ" in that province; the PECs are similar in structure (though inferior) to the party's National Executive Committee (PEC).

In terms of the constitution, the PECs' functions include policy implementation, management of provincial party funds, and selection of provincial party candidates for government elections. Each PEC may also supervise and direct all ANC organs in its province, including local and regional party branches and ANC caucuses in provincial and local governments. Much of a PEC's day-to-day work is carried out by the Provincial Working Committee, which the PEC elects from among its members at the beginning of each term.

Each PEC itself comprises no more than 35 elected members, including five officials. These are elected by secret ballot at a regular provincial conference, analogous to the party's national conference, attended by delegates who represent each of the local party branches in the province. In recent years, a PEC's constitutional term is four years, so each province is required to hold a conference at least every four years. PEC members are required to have been ANC members in good standing for at least seven years and, in line with the ANC's policy of applying internal gender quotas, at least half of every PEC's members must be women. In addition, the party constitution provides for some unelected persons to sit on the PECs: the leader(s) of each region in the province are represented as ex officio members, as are the provincial leaders of the ANC's three leagues (the Women's League, the Youth League, and the Veterans' League); each elected PEC may also co-opt up to three additional members to ensure "balanced representation". The size and term of the PECs have varied since 1994 with constitutional amendments: under the 1997 ANC constitution, for example, PECs comprised no more than 18 elected members serving three-year terms.

In terms of the party constitution, PECs are ultimately subordinate to the NEC, which must ensure that they function "democratically and effectively" and which may suspend or dissolve any PEC "where necessary". This provision is commonly applied during factional crises, particularly when this means that the affected province is not able to hold its conference timeously and the PEC exceeds its four-year term. If a PEC is disbanded, the constitution prescribes that a new PEC must be elected within nine months and that the NEC must appoint "an interim structure" – commonly referred to as a provincial task team – to lead the province until then. In practice, this nine-month deadline is not always met; in the Western Cape, for example, an unelected task team installed in 2019 still controlled the province in 2022.

== Top Five officials ==
Each PEC is led by the so-called "Top Five" officials in the province, who are elected with the rest of the PEC at the provincial conference. These are the chairperson, deputy chairperson, secretary, deputy secretary, and treasurer. The Top Five is analogous to the NEC's Top Six, with the provincial chairperson and deputy chairperson positions corresponding to the national presidency and deputy presidency, but with no provincial position corresponding to the national chairmanship.

The provincial chairperson is therefore the provincial party leader, responsible for overall political leadership of the province. The provincial secretary position is also highly influential. A full-time salaried ANC functionary, the provincial secretary is responsible, among other things, for auditing and verifying local ANC branches, a process which often has significant import for the outcomes of provincial and national conferences. In the past, the support of provincial chairpersons and secretaries has been decisive for the candidacies of national leaders – as was arguably the case with the election of Jacob Zuma as ANC president at the 52nd National Conference in 2007 and the election of Cyril Ramaphosa at the 54th National Conference in 2017.

Each provincial chairperson and secretary is also an ex officio member of the NEC. However, any ANC member who is directly elected or co-opted onto the NEC cannot take up his seat unless he resigns from any subnational offices he holds in the ANC. In the past, the party constitution allowed for exceptions in "extraordinary circumstances"; Jacob Zuma claimed that this provision was written to allow him to serve simultaneously as national chairperson and KwaZulu-Natal provincial chairperson, which he did from 1994 to 1998.

== "Two centres of power" ==
In most phases of South Africa's post-apartheid history, it has been typical for the provincial chairperson of the ANC to become the ANC's candidate for the premiership, the head of the provincial executive, in the government of their respective province. Each premier is indirectly elected by the provincial legislature, but ANC legislative caucuses take their instructions from the party; the premier in turn has the power to appoint his provincial cabinet, the Executive Council, and typically appoints colleagues from the ANC PEC as provincial ministers. These norms are "a matter of stated convention not embedded in the law but consistent with it", and have historically been controversial within the ANC and in broader society.

Pursuant to South Africa's first democratic election in 1994, the ANC won power and formed a government in all but two of the country's new provinces. During this period, the national leadership of the ANC, under president Nelson Mandela, sought to link the position of provincial party chairperson with the position of premier, arguing that the linkage would strengthen local democracy, as local members of the ANC (at that time the majority party in most provinces) would thereby have greater participation in selecting their premiers. In practice, however, the national ANC achieved this linkage not by foregoing control over the selection of premiers but by extending its control over the selection of party chairpersons: in the early and mid-1990s, the national ANC expended much energy persuading and negotiating with local members and leaders to have their preferred premier candidates elected as provincial chairs. After the 1994 election, only two ANC members – Raymond Mhlaba in the Eastern Cape and Mosuioa Lekota in the Free State – became premier in their respective provinces without winning election to the party chairmanship. Both Mhlaba and Lekota were given "special attention" by the national leadership, who lobbied for their election to the NEC at the party's 49th National Conference in December 1994.

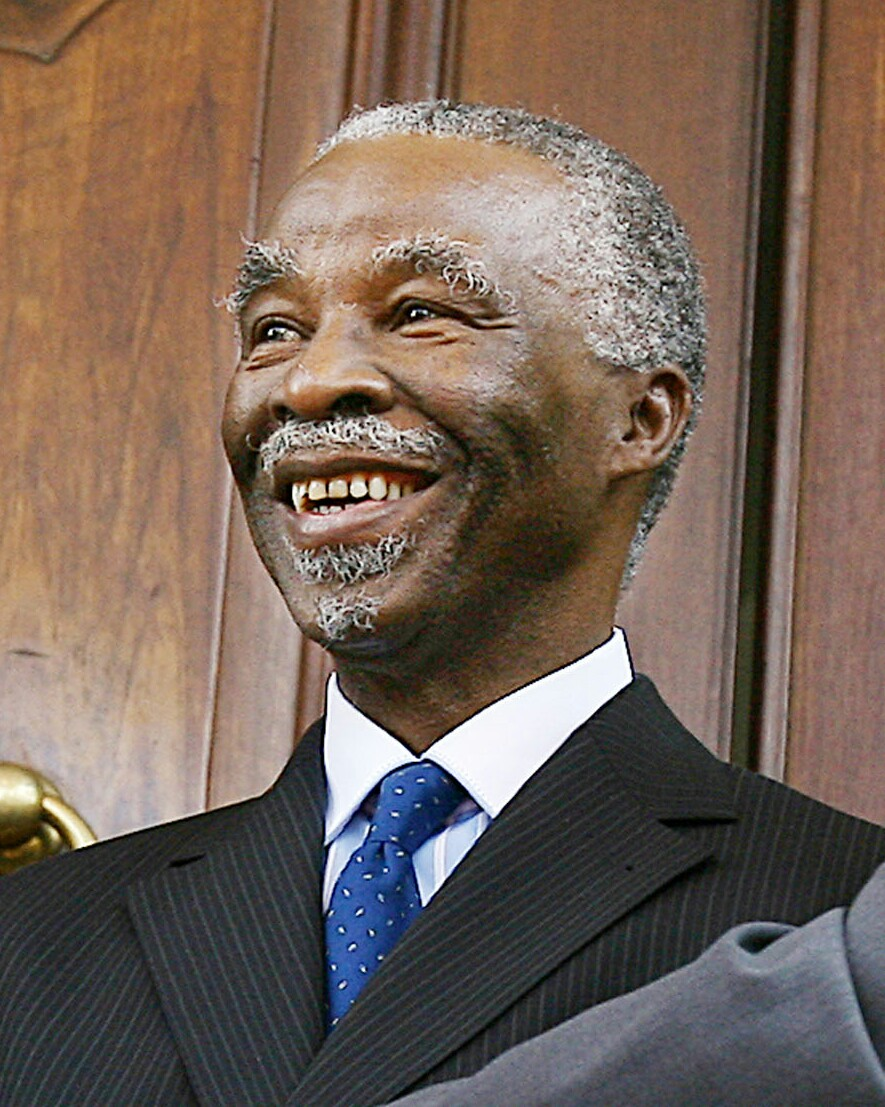
Critics accused ANC president Thabo Mbeki of creating "two centres of power" when he appointed premiers who were not ANC provincial chairs.

In 1998, the NEC – then led by Thabo Mbeki, who had been elected ANC president in 1997 – endorsed a formal proposal to "delink" the positions of provincial chairperson and premier. Provincial chairpersons would no longer automatically become the ANC's presumptive candidates for the premiership. Mbeki explained that the ANC was "more concerned with the ability to run the provincial administration than the popularity of the individual". In the next general elections in 1999 and 2004, which also saw Mbeki elected as president of South Africa, this new policy was applied and was generally extremely poorly received within the ANC: members and subnational leaders resented what they perceived as "the imposition of relative outsiders as premiers". In the Free State, for example, supporters of longstanding ANC provincial chairperson Ace Magashule battled with a series of premiers viewed as Mbeki acolytes. The ANC and national media began to debate the so-called "two centres of power" theory, which held that the delinkage had created two centres of power in each province, one in the party and one in the state, which led to tensions within the party and undermined the efficacy and cohesiveness of governance by the state. In later years, Mbeki called this argument "faulty", said it had been "cooked up in order to achieve particular objectives", and defended his policy as necessary to entrench the separation of party and state.

Although the "two centres of power" notion originated to explain subnational discord in the ANC, the debate was applied to national politics when it became clear that Mbeki intended to run for a third president as ANC president in 2007 even though the national Constitution precluded his running for another term as national president. Those who opposed Mbeki's re-election argued that it would create two centres of power in the national ANC and would therefore be disruptive. At the 52nd National Conference in 2007, Mbeki lost his re-election bid to Jacob Zuma, who set about restoring the ANC as the single so-called centre of power, facilitated by resolutions taken at the same conference: the conference formally resolved that henceforth the ANC president would be the ANC's candidate for national president and that premiers would be selected by the NEC from a list of three names submitted by the province's PEC.

== List of current leaders ==
The current chairpersons of the ANC's nine provinces are:

- Free State: Mxolisi Dukwana (2023–)
- KwaZulu-Natal: Vacant
- North West: Nono Maloyi (2022–)
- Mpumalanga: Mandla Ndlovu (acting 2018–2022, elected 2022–)
- Gauteng: Vacant
- Eastern Cape: Vacant
- Western Cape: Vacant
- Northern Cape: Zamani Saul (2017–)
- Limpopo: Phophi Ramathuba (2026–)

== List of former leaders ==
In 2005, Edna Molewa of the North West became the first woman to hold a provincial chairmanship in the ANC; she remained the only woman to do so as of 2022. As of 2022, Ace Magashule held the party's record for longest tenure as provincial chairperson; he led the Free State province from 1998 to 2017, although during that period the NEC dissolved his PEC and replaced it with an interim body on more than one occasion. When the national executive takes this recourse, the term of the Top Five officials also end and the province is led by an unelected task team convenor rather than an elected chairperson.

=== Free State ===
Election of Free State Top Five officials (1994–2023)
Conference	Chairperson	Deputy chairperson	Secretary	Deputy secretary	Treasurer	Ref.
1994	Pat Matosa	Ace Magashule	Kaiser Sebothelo (Note: Sebothelo died in 1996.)	Anna Buthelezi	Aaron Mnguni	
1997	Zingile Dingani	Ben Kotsoane	Sello Dithebe	Baarde Tsoai	Doctor Monareng	
1998 (Note: This PEC was dissolved in 2000.)	Ace Magashule	Casca Mokitlane	Paul Mahlatsi	Vax Mayekiso	Tate Makgoe	
2002	Ace Magashule	Casca Mokitlane	Pat Matosa	Charlotte Pheko-Lobe	Mxolisi Dukwana	
2005	Ace Magashule	Pat Matosa	Charlotte Pheko-Lobe (Note: Pheko-Lobe resigned in 2008.)	Sibongile Besani	Mxolisi Dukwana	
2008	Ace Magashule	Thabo Manyoni	Sibongile Besani	Mamiki Qabathe	Mxolisi Dukwana	
2012 (Note: The results of the 2012 election were nullified later in 2012.)	Ace Magashule	Thabo Manyoni	William Bulwane	Mamiki Qabathe	Msebenzi Zwane	
2013	Ace Magashule	Thabo Manyoni	William Bulwane	Mamiki Qabathe	Msebenzi Zwane	
2017 (Note: The results of the 2017 election were nullified later in 2017.)	Ace Magashule	Paseka Nompondo	William Bulwane	Mamiki Qabathe	Msebenzi Zwane	
2018 (Note: This PEC was dissolved in 2021.)	Sam Mashinini	William Bulwane	Paseka Nompondo	Mamiki Qabathe	Sisi Ntombela	
2023	Mxolisi Dukwana	Ketso Makume	Polediso Motsoeneng	Dibolelo Mahlatsi	Mathabo Leeto	

=== KwaZulu-Natal ===
Election of KwaZulu-Natal Top Five officials (1994–2021)
Conference	Chairperson	Deputy chairperson	Secretary	Deputy secretary	Treasurer	Ref.
1994	Jacob Zuma	Zibuse Mlaba	Senzo Mchunu	Sifiso Nkabinde	Zweli Mkhize	
1996	Jacob Zuma	S'bu Ndebele	Sipho Gcabashe	Bheki Cele	Zweli Mkhize	
1998	S'bu Ndebele	Zweli Mkhize	Sipho Gcabashe	Senzo Mchunu	Mike Mabuyakhulu	
2002	S'bu Ndebele	Zweli Mkhize	Sipho Gcabashe	Senzo Mchunu	Mike Mabuyakhulu	
2005	S'bu Ndebele	Zweli Mkhize	Senzo Mchunu	Mbuso Kubheka	Mike Mabuyakhulu	
2008	Zweli Mkhize	Willies Mchunu	Senzo Mchunu (Note: Mchunu's deputy, Sihle Zikalala, replaced him in 2009.)	Sihle Zikalala	Peggy Nkonyeni	
2012	Zweli Mkhize (Note: Senzo Mchunu replaced Mkhize in 2013.)	Willies Mchunu	Sihle Zikalala	Nomusa Dube-Ncube	Peggy Nkonyeni	
2015 (Note: The results of the 2015 election were nullified in 2018.)	Sihle Zikalala	Willies Mchunu	Super Zuma	Mluleki Ndobe	Nomusa Dube-Ncube	
2018	Sihle Zikalala	Mike Mabuyakhulu	Mdumiseni Ntuli	Sipho Hlomuka	Nomusa Dube-Ncube	
2022 (Note: This PEC was dissolved in 2025.)	Siboniso Duma	Nomagugu Simelane	Bheki Mtolo	Sipho Hlomuka	Ntuthuko Mahlaba	

The 20 additional members of the KwaZulu-Natal PEC as elected in 2012 were Senzo Mchunu, Siyabonga Cwele, Ina Cronje, Bheki Ntuli, Ntombikayise Sibhidla-Saphetha, Lydia Johnson, Ravi Pillay, Mildred Oliphant, Lungi Gcabashe, Jabu Khumalo, Mthandeni Dlungwane, Nomvuzo Shabalala, Ester Qwabe, Hlengiwe Mavimbela, Mxolisi Kaunda, Bongi Sithole, Senzo Mkhize, Lindiwe Njoko, Sipho Gcabashe, and Nigel Gumede.

The 30 additional members elected in 2015 were Fikile Khumalo, Bheki Mtolo, Mervyn Dirks, Lydia Johnson, Makhosi Zungu, Nomagugu Simelane-Zulu, Weziwe Thusi, Duduzile Mazibuko, Nontembeko Boyce, Celiwe Madlopha, Maggie Govender, Makhoni Ntuli, Khulani Hadebe, Mkhawuleni Khumalo, Vincent Madlala, Siphindile Zondi, Arthur Zwane, Zanele Nyawo, Jabu Khumalo, Bongi Sithole-Moloi, Senzo Mkhize, Sipho Gcabashe, Mxolisi Kaunda, Sduduzo Gumede, Mdumiseni Ntuli, Meshack Radebe, Lindiwe Mjobo, Ravi Pillay, Phumzile Zulu, and Ester Qwabe.

The 30 additional members elected in 2022 were Peggy Nkonyeni, Mdumiseni Ntuli, Nomusa Dube-Ncube, Nonhlanhla Khoza, Nhlakanipho Ntombela, Super Zuma, Nomakiki Majola, Nobuhle Nkabane, Bheki Ntuli, Nolubabalo Mthembu, Ndodephethe Mthethwa, Sizophila Mkhize, Mafika Mndebele, Khonza Ngidi, Jomo Sibiya, Celiwe Madlopha, Sbongile Khathi, Ntobeko Boyce, Makhosi Zungu, Londolo Zungu, Masenti Myeni, Kwazi Mshengu, Mxolisi Kaunda, Mbali Frazer, Bongi Moloi, Amanda Mapena, Mzi Zuma, Zinhle Cele and Tholi Gwala.

=== North West ===
Election of North West Top Five officials (1994–2021)
Conference	Chairperson	Deputy chairperson	Secretary	Deputy secretary	Treasurer	Ref.
1994	Popo Molefe	Malose Lehobye	Ndleleni Duma	Kgotso Kgasu	Maureen Modiselle	
1996	Popo Molefe	Johannes Tselapedi	Ndleleni Duma	Joe Selau	Maureen Modiselle	
1998	Popo Molefe	Jerry Thibedi	Siphiwe Ngwenya	Jomo Khasu	Martin Kuscus	
2002	Popo Molefe	Jerry Thibedi	Siphiwe Ngwenya	Molefi Sefularo	Edna Molewa	
2005	Edna Molewa	Molefi Sefularo	Supra Mahumapelo	Ndleleni Duma	Maureen Modiselle	
2008 (Note: This PEC was dissolved in 2009.)	Nono Maloyi	Molefi Sefularo	Supra Mahumapelo	Nikiwe Num	Rebecca Kasienyane	
2011	Supra Mahumapelo	China Dodovu	Kabelo Mataboge (Note: In 2013, Dakota Legoete replaced Mataboge.)	Gordon Kegakilwe	Philly Mapulane (Note: In 2013, Susan Tsebe Dantjie replaced Mapulane.)	
2015 (Note: This PEC was dissolved in 2018.)	Supra Mahumapelo	Sello Lehari	Dakota Legoete	Susan Tsebe Dantjie	Kgakgamatso Morwagaswe	
2022	Nono Maloyi	Lazzy Mokgosi	Louis Diremelo	Viola Motsumi	Sello Lehari	

=== Mpumalanga ===
Election of Mpumalanga Top Five officials (1994–2021)
Conference	Chairperson	Deputy chairperson	Secretary	Deputy secretary	Treasurer	Ref.
1994	Mathews Phosa	Jacques Modipane	Solly Zwane	January Masilela	Ka Shabangu	
1996	Mathews Phosa	Jacques Modipane	Solly Zwane	Jeri Ngomane	Ka Shabangu	
1999	Ndaweni Mahlangu	David Mabuza	Solly Zwane	Siphosezwe Masango	Jeri Ngomane	
2002	Fish Mahlalela	William Lubisi	Lucas Mello	Busi Coleman	David Mkhwanazi	
2005	Thabang Makwetla	David Mabuza	Lucas Mello	Dina Pule	David Mkhwanazi	
2008	David Mabuza	Charles Makola	Lucky Ndinisa	Nana Dlamini	Clifford Mkasi	
2012	David Mabuza	David Dube	Lucky Ndinisa	Violet Siwela	Andries Gamede	
2015	David Mabuza (Note: Mandla Ndlovu replaced Mabuza in an acting capacity in 2018.)	Violet Siwela	Mandla Ndlovu (Note: When Ndlovu became acting chairperson in 2018, his deputy, Lindiwe Ntshalintshali, became acting secretary.)	Lindiwe Ntshalintshali	Vusi Shongwe	
2022	Mandla Ndlovu	Speedy Mashilo	Muzi Chirwa	Lindiwe Ntshalintshali	Mandla Msibi (Note: Msibi stepped aside in 2022 and was suspended in 2024.)	
2026	Mandla Ndlovu	Speedy Mashilo	Muzi Chirwa	Mpumi Hlophe	Sibongile Makushe-Mazibuko	

=== Gauteng ===
Election of Gauteng Top Five officials (1994–2021)
Conference	Chairperson	Deputy chairperson	Secretary	Deputy secretary	Treasurer	Ref.
1994	Tokyo Sexwale	Mathole Motshekga	Paul Mashatile	Obed Bapela	Mohammed Dangor	
1996	Tokyo Sexwale (Note: Mathole Motshekga replaced Sexwale in 1997.)	Mathole Motshekga	Paul Mashatile	Obed Bapela	Amos Masondo	
1998 (Note: This PEC was dissolved in 2000.)	Mathole Motshekga	Paul Mashatile	Obed Bapela	Mandla Nkomfe	Joyce Kgoali	
2001	Mbhazima Shilowa	Angie Motshekga	David Makhura	Mandla Nkomfe	Lindiwe Maseko	
2004	Mbhazima Shilowa	Angie Motshekga	David Makhura	Mandla Nkomfe	Lindiwe Maseko	
2007	Paul Mashatile	Nomvula Mokonyane	David Makhura	Mandla Nkomfe	Lindiwe Maseko	
2010	Paul Mashatile	Gwen Ramokgopa	David Makhura	Humphrey Mmemezi	Ntombi Mekgwe	
2014	Paul Mashatile	David Makhura	Hope Papo	Gwen Ramokgopa	Ntombi Mekgwe	
2018	David Makhura	Panyaza Lesufi	Jacob Khawe	Nomantu Nkomo-Ralehoko	Parks Tau	
2022 (Note: This PEC was dissolved in 2025.)	Panyaza Lesufi	Nomantu Nkomo-Ralehoko	TK Nciza	Tasneem Motara	Morakane Mosupyoe	

The 30 additional members of the Gauteng PEC as elected in 2018 were Ntombi Mekgwe, Khusela Diko, Kgosientso Ramokgopa, Lebogang Maile, Matome Chiloane, Boyce Maneli, Robert Mashego, Bandile Masuku, Rebecca Digamela, Tasneem Motara, Judith Tshabalala, Refiloe Kekana, Pretty Xaba, Mapiti Matsena, Bones Modise, Lindiwe Lasindwa, Dolly Ledwaba, Ezra Letsoalo, Peace Mabe, Dipuo Mvelase, Tshilidzi Munyai, Qedani Mahlangu, Kedibone Diale, Mbali Hlophe, Nomvuyo Mhlakaza, Mzi Khumalo, Morakane Mosupyoe, Hope Papo, Brian Hlongwa, and Gogo Ndlovana.

The 30 additional members of the Gauteng PEC as elected in 2022 were Bandile Masuku, Lebogang Maile, Mbali Hlophe, Nomathemba Mokgethi, Matome Chiloane, Nomvuyo Mhlakaza, Mzi Khumalo, Paul Mojapelo, Tebogo Letsie, Ntombi Mekgwe, Peace Mabe, Khusela Diko, Kedibone Diale, Nathi Congwane, Nonceba Molwele, Greg Schneemann, Judith Tshabalala, Joyce Boshomane, Vuyo Mhaga, Lesego Makhubela, Honours Mukhari, Thulani Ndlovu, Bones Modise, Ezra Letsoalo, Tshilidzi Munyai, Jane Mananiso, Pretty Xaba, Andiswa Mosai, Rebecca Digamela, and Gogo Ndlovana.

=== Eastern Cape ===
Election of Eastern Cape Top Five officials (1994–2021)
Conference	Chairperson	Deputy chairperson	Secretary	Deputy secretary	Treasurer	Ref.
1994	Dumisani Mafu	Mzwandile Masala	Bongani Gxilishe	Mahlubandile Qwase	Khuilile Mpahlaza	
1996	Makhenkesi Stofile	Stone Sizani	Humphrey Maxegwana	Mahlubandile Qwase	Noxolo Kiviet	
1998 (Note: An elective conference was held in 2002 to replace this PEC, but the results were annulled.)	Makhenkesi Stofile	Stone Sizani	Humphrey Maxegwana	Mahlubandile Qwase	Noxolo Kiviet	
2003	Makhenkesi Stofile	Enoch Godongwana	Humphrey Maxegwana	Mbulelo Sogoni		
2006	Stone Sizani	Mbulelo Sogoni	Siphatho Handi (Note: Handi resigned in 2008.)	Pemmy Majodina	Tokozile Xasa	
2009	Phumulo Masualle	Gugile Nkwinti	Oscar Mabuyane	Helen Sauls-August	Thandiswa Marawu	
2013	Phumulo Masualle	Sakhumzi Somyo	Oscar Mabuyane	Helen Sauls-August	Thandiswa Marawu	
2017	Oscar Mabuyane	Mlungisi Mvoko	Lulama Ngcukaitobi	Helen Sauls-August	Babalo Madikizela	
2022 (Note: This PEC was dissolved in 2026.)	Oscar Mabuyane	Mlungisi Mvoko	Lulama Ngcukaitobi	Helen Sauls-August	Zolile Williams	

The 30 additional members of the Eastern Cape PEC as elected in 2022 were Fundile Gade, Bukiwe Fanta, Nonceba Kontsiwe, Nqabisa Gantsho, Loyiso Magqashela, Stella Ndabeni-Abrahams, Nomakhosazana Meth, Xolile Nqatha, Lindelwa Dunjwa, Lindiwe Gunuza, Sixolile Mehlomakhulu, Sisisi Tolashe, William Ngozi, Nanziwe Rulashe, Yanga Zicina, Nonkqubela Pieters, Virginia Camealio-Benjamin, Clara Yekiso, Avela Mjajubana, Sindile Toni, Thandekile Sabisa, Siphokazi Mani-Lusithi, Nozibele Nyalambisa, Thokozile Sokanyile, Nontuthuzelo Maqubela, Mthetheleli Sam, Nomhle Sango, Siyabulela Zangqa, Mpumelelo Khuzwayo, and Andile Lungisa.

=== Western Cape ===
Election of Western Cape Top Five officials (1994–2021)
Conference	Chairperson	Deputy chairperson	Secretary	Deputy secretary	Treasurer	Ref.
1994	Chris Nissen	Phumzile Mlambo-Ngcuka	James Ngculu	Manfred van Rooyen	Lulamile Xate	
1996	Dullah Omar	Nomaindia Mfeketho	James Ngculu	Marius Fransman	Ebrahim Rasool	
1998	Ebrahim Rasool	Nomaindia Mfeketho	Mcebisi Skwatsha	Marius Fransman	Rhoda Joemat	
2001	Ebrahim Rasool	Nomatyala Hangana	Mcebisi Skwatsha	Marius Fransman	Lynne Brown	
2005	James Ngculu	Randall van den Heever	Mcebisi Skwatsha	Max Ozinsky	Lynne Brown	
2008 (Note: This PEC was dissolved in 2009.)	Mcebisi Skwatsha	Lynne Brown	Sipho Kroma	Max Ozinsky	Songezo Mjongile	
2011	Marius Fransman	Abe Bekeer	Songezo Mjongile	Maureen Gillion	Fezile Calana	
2015 (Note: This PEC was dissolved in 2019.)	Marius Fransman (Note: Fransman was suspended in 2016.)	Khaya Magaxa	Faiez Jacobs	Thandi Manikivana	Maureen Gillion	
2023 (Note: This PEC was dissolved in 2025.)	JJ Tyhalisisu	Sharon Davids	Neville Delport	Ayanda Bans	Derrick Appel	

=== Northern Cape ===
Election of Northern Cape Top Five officials (1994–2021)
Conference	Chairperson	Deputy chairperson	Secretary	Deputy secretary	Treasurer	Ref.
1994	Manne Dipico	Godfrey Oliphant	William Steenkamp	Kenneth Khumalo	Modise Matlaopane	
1996	Manne Dipico	Godfrey Oliphant	John Block	Fred Wyngaardt	Dipuo Peters	
1998	Manne Dipico	John Block	Neville Mompati	Fred Wyngaardt	Dipuo Peters	
2001	Manne Dipico (Note: In 2003, Dipico was replaced by his deputy, John Block, and then (in an acting capacity) by Dipuo Peters.)	John Block	Neville Mompati	Fred Wyngaardt	Dipuo Peters	
2004	John Block	Fred Wyngaardt	Neville Mompati	Zamani Saul	Tina Joemat-Pettersson	
2008	John Block	Kenny Mmoiemang	Zamani Saul	Alvin Botes	Yolanda Botha	
2012	John Block (Note: Block resigned in 2015.)	Kenny Mmoiemang	Zamani Saul	Alvin Botes	Yolanda Botha (Note: Sylvia Lucas replaced Botha in 2015.)	
2017	Zamani Saul	Bentley Vass	Deshi Ngxanga	Maruping Lekwene	Fufe Makatong	
2021	Zamani Saul	Bentley Vass	Deshi Ngxanga	Maruping Lekwene	Fufe Makatong	
2025	Zamani Saul	Bentley Vass	Deshi Ngxanga	Maruping Lekwene	Fufe Makatong	

The 30 additional members of the Northern Cape PEC as elected in 2025 were Sandiseni Sithole, Abraham Vosloo, Kenny Mmoiemang, Nontobeko Vilakazi, Lebogang Motlhaping, Dineo Tshabalala, Lorato Moleleki, Kenalemang Bojosi, Venus Blennies-Magage, Newrene Klaaste, Limakatso Koloi, Zolile Monakali, Rodney Pieterse, Thobeka Mthintelwa, Zolile Mjandana, Tsaone De Huis, Rosie Ludick, Vuyani Mhlauli, Cecelia Oliphant, Rachel Adams, Ragel Louw, Tshepo Louw, Violet Jordan, Sharon Plaatjie, Lorenda Fienies, Dikgang Stock, Mase Manopole, Helena English, Cornell Knoph, and Roger Swartz.

=== Limpopo ===
Election of Limpopo Top Five officials (1994–2026)
Conference	Chairperson	Deputy chairperson	Secretary	Deputy secretary	Treasurer	Ref.
1994	Ngoako Ramatlhodi	Joe Phaahla	Collins Chabane	Benny Boshielo	Sam Rampedi	
1996	George Mashamba	Joe Phaahla	Collins Chabane	Benny Boshielo	Jerry Ndou	
1998 (Note: This PEC was dissolved in 2001.)	Ngoako Ramatlhodi	Robert Malavi	Benny Boshielo	Jerry Ndou	Tshenuwani Farisani	
2002	Ngoako Ramatlhodi	Joyce Mashamba	Cassel Mathale		Thaba Mufamadi	
2005	Sello Moloto	Joyce Mashamba	Cassel Mathale	Maite Nkoana-Mashabane	De Wet Monakedi	
2008	Cassel Mathale	Dickson Masemola	Joe Maswanganyi	Pinky Kekana	Dipuo Letsatsi	
2011 (Note: This PEC was dissolved in 2013.)	Cassel Mathale	Dickson Masemola	Soviet Lekganyane	Florence Radzilani	Pinky Kekana	
2014	Stan Mathabatha	Jerry Ndou	Nocks Seabi	Makoma Makhurupetje	Thembi Nwendamutswu (Note: In 2015, Nwendamutswu was replaced by Danny Msiza.)	
2018	Stan Mathabatha	Florence Radzilani	Soviet Lekganyane	Basikopo Makamu	Danny Msiza	
2022	Stan Mathabatha	Florence Radzilani	Reuben Madadzhe	Basikopo Makamu	Nakedi Sibanda-Kekana	
2026	Phophi Ramathuba	John Mpe	Reuben Madadzhe	Pule Shai	Eddie Maila	

The 30 additional members of the Limpopo PEC as elected in 2018 were Dickson Masemola, Phophi Ramathuba, Thabo Mokone, Rodgers Monama, Jerry Ndou, Nkakareng Rakgoale, Falaza Mdaka, Polly Boshielo, Mapula Mokaba, Seaparo Sekoati, Donald Selamolela, Joshua Matlou, Tolly Mashamaite, Nandi Ndalane, Thandi Moraka, Lehlogonolo Masoga, Kennedy Tshivase, Simon Mathe, Rudolph Phala, Rosinah Mogotlane, Sarah Lamola, Violet Mathye, Mavhungu Lerule-Ramakhanya, Makoma Makhurupetje, Johanna Aphiri, Andrina Matsimela, Lilliet Mamaregane, Maria Thamaga, Monicca Mochadi and Caroline Mahasela.

The 30 additional members of the Limpopo PEC as elected in 2022 were Phophi Ramathuba, Makoma Makhurupetje, Thabo Mokone, Mavhungu Lerule-Ramakhanya, Rodgers Monama, Nkakareng Rakgoale, Jimmy Machaka, Falaza Mdaka, Simon Mathe, Morris Mataboge, Bella Kupa, Kate Bilankulu, Mapula Mokaba, Caroline Mahasela, Mpho Mudau, Maria Thamaga, Essop Mokgonyana, Jeremiah Ngobeni, Violet Mathye, Rosemary Molapo, Cherries Pokane, Kedibone Lebea, Reggie Molokomme, Solomon Pheedi, Khathutshelo Netshifhefhe, Soviet Lekganyane, Frans Mokwele, Khumbudzo Ntshavheni, Maropene Ramokgopa and Sanny Ndhlovu.

The 30 additional members of the Limpopo PEC as elected in 2026 were Basikopo Makamu, Rodgers Monama, Mavhungu Lerule-Ramakhanya, Florence Radzilani, Makoma Makhurupetje, Nkakareng Rakgoale, Tebogo Mamorobela, Goodman Mtileni, Kedibone Lebea, Mamedupi Teffo, Nakedi Kekana, Thabo Mokone, Tony Rachoene, Solomon Pheedi, Sanny Ndhlovu, Caroline Mahasela, Falaza Mdaka, Mapula Mokaba, Gloria Mnisi, Essob Mokgonyane, Kgabo Mahoai, Welhemina Modise, Esther Mokwele, Khathutshelo Netshifhefhe, Phineus Boko Sebola, Reggie Molokomme, Letjeka Pheeha, Bella Kupa, Kate Bilankulu, and Wesley Maringa. At its first meeting after the elective conference, the PEC resolved to co-opt three additional members: Orginia Mafefe, Delly Matjomane, and Bongani Nkonyana.

== See also ==
- History of the African National Congress
- National Executive Committee of the African National Congress
- Presidents of the African National Congress Women's League
- Presidents of the African National Congress Youth League
- Step-aside rule
