= Refiloe (given name) =

Refiloe/Refilwe is a Sotho–Tswana given name meaning "we have been given/awarded". Notable people with the name include:

- Refiloe Kekana (born 1967), South African politician
- Refiloe Jane (born 1992), South African soccer player
- Refiloe Mothapo, South African politician
- Refiloe Johannes Mudimu (born 1954), South African Navy Admiral
- Refiloe Nt'sekhe (born 1977), South African politician
- Refiloe Phoolo (born 1990), South African musician, entrepreneur, record producer, and amateur boxer
- Refiloe Potse (born 1978), Mosotho footballer
- Refilwe Tholakele (born 1996), Motswana footballer

== Music ==
- Refiloe, 2015 album by Cassper Nyovest

== Places ==
- Refilwe, Gauteng, South Africa, a township
