= Joe Phaahla =

South African politician (born 1957)

The Honourable Joe Phaahla MP
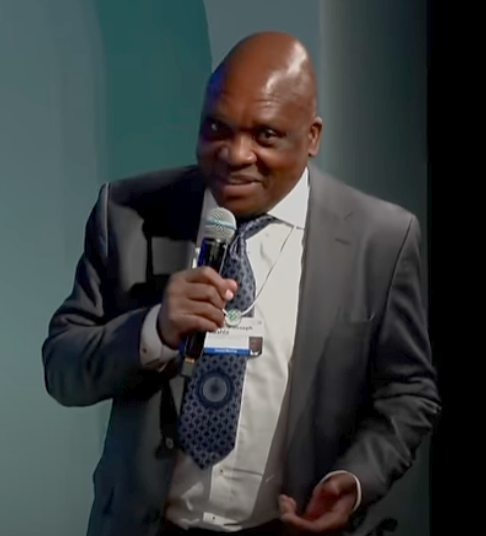
- Phaahla at the 2024 World Economic Forum

Deputy Minister of Health
- Incumbent
- Assumed office 2 July 2024
- President: Cyril Ramaphosa
- Minister: Aaron Motsoaledi
- Preceded by: Sibongiseni Dhlomo
- In office 26 May 2014 – 5 August 2021
- President: Cyril Ramaphosa; Jacob Zuma
- Minister: Zweli Mkhize; Aaron Motsoaledi
- Preceded by: Gwen Ramokgopa
- Succeeded by: Sibongiseni Dhlomo

26th Minister of Health
- In office 5 August 2021 – 19 June 2024
- President: Cyril Ramaphosa
- Deputy: Sibongiseni Dhlomo
- Preceded by: Zweli Mkhize
- Succeeded by: Aaron Motsoaledi

Deputy Minister of Arts and Culture
- In office 31 October 2010 – 7 May 2014
- President: Jacob Zuma
- Minister: Paul Mashatile
- Preceded by: Paul Mashatile
- Succeeded by: Rejoice Mabudafhasi

Deputy Minister of Rural Development and Land Reform
- In office 11 May 2009 – 31 October 2010
- President: Jacob Zuma
- Minister: Gugile Nkwinti
- Preceded by: Portfolio established
- Succeeded by: Thulas Nxesi

Member of the National Assembly
- Incumbent
- Assumed office 6 May 2009

Deputy Provincial Chairperson of the African National Congress in Limpopo
- In office 1994–1998
- Chairperson: Ngoako Ramatlhodi; George Mashamba
- Preceded by: Position established
- Succeeded by: Robert Malavi

Member of the Limpopo Provincial Legislature
- In office 1994–2000

Personal details
- Born: Mathume Joseph Phaahla; 11 July 1957 (age 69) Ga-Phaahla, Transvaal; Union of South Africa
- Party: African National Congress
- Education: University of Natal (MBBS)

Mathume Joseph Phaahla (born 11 July 1957) is a South African politician who is currently serving as the Deputy Minister of Health since July 2024. He was formerly the Minister of Health between August 2021 and May 2024. A member of the National Executive Committee of the African National Congress (ANC), he has been a deputy minister since May 2009, when he joined the National Assembly; he served an earlier stint as Deputy Minister of Health between May 2014 and August 2021.

Born in Limpopo, Phaahla trained as a medical doctor at the University of Natal, where he became active in the anti-apartheid movement. He was the president of the Azanian Students' Organisation from 1981 to 1983 and later was a regional leader in the United Democratic Front. Upon the end of apartheid in 1994, Phaahla left his medical career to join the inaugural Executive Council of Limpopo; under Premier Ngoako Ramatlhodi, he was the province's first Member of the Executive Council for Health from 1994 to 1997 and then Member of the Executive Council for Education from 1997 to 2000. He was also a member of the ANC Provincial Executive Committee from 1991 to 2001, including as Deputy Provincial Chairperson from 1994 to 1998.

Between 2000 and 2009, Phaahla took a hiatus from legislative politics, initially to work in sports administration as the head of the South African Sports Commission and then as the head of the government's preparations for the 2010 FIFA World Cup. During this period, at the ANC's Polokwane conference in December 2007, Phaahla was elected to the ANC National Executive Committee for the first time. From 2008 to 2009, during the 2009 general election campaign, he worked at Luthuli House as the head of the ANC presidency under Jacob Zuma.

Phaahla was elected to the National Assembly in the 2009 election and was appointed as Deputy Minister of Rural Development and Land Reform under Zuma's first cabinet from 2009 to 2010. After that, he served as Deputy Minister of Arts and Culture from 2010 to 2014, and then as Deputy Minister of Health from 2014 to 2021. President Cyril Ramaphosa promoted him to the cabinet on 5 August 2021 following the resignation of the former Health Minister, Zweli Mkhize.

== Early life and education ==
Phaahla was born on 11 July 1957 in Ga-Phaahla, a rural village in the former Northern Transvaal. He completed an MBBS at the University of Natal in 1983. He also holds tertiary diplomas, including one in health service management from the University of Haifa.

== Medical career and activism ==
After graduating, and until the end of apartheid in 1994, Phaahla worked as a doctor and medical administrator in the Transvaal. He was a senior medical officer and superintendent at Mapulaneng Hospital in Bushbuckridge from 1987 until 1990, when he was appointed as medical superintendent at St Rita's Hospital in Glen Cowie; then, between 1993 and 1994, he was the director of medical services in the Department of Health of Lebowa, an apartheid-era bantustan.

At the same time, Phaahla was active in the anti-apartheid movement. His political involvement began at university, where he was a member of the student representative council from 1979 to 1981. A founding member of the Azanian Students' Organisation, he was AZASO's national president from 1981 to 1983. In 1982, he told the Christian Science Monitor that one of his priorities as AZASO president was to establish closer ties with community and labour organisations. In 1983, still living in Natal, he joined the United Democratic Front and was elected as its regional secretary. Later, during the negotiations to end apartheid, he was a regional leader of the African National Congress (ANC); he was a member of the ANC's Provincial Executive Committee in the Northern Transvaal (later called Limpopo) from 1991 to 2001.

== Limpopo Executive Council: 1994–2000 ==
In South Africa's first post-apartheid elections in April 1994, Phaahla was elected to represent the ANC in the newly established Limpopo Provincial Legislature (then still named after the Northern Transvaal). He was also appointed to the Executive Council of Ngoako Ramatlhodi, the Premier of Limpopo, who named him as the province's inaugural Member of the Executive Council (MEC) for Health and Welfare.

He remained in the health portfolio until 1 July 1997, when Ramatlhodi announced a reshuffle that saw Phaahla replace Aaron Motsoaledi as MEC for Education; Hunadi Mateme, in turn, succeeded Phaahla as Health MEC. He remained in that position until 2000, gaining re-election to the provincial legislature in June 1999.

Throughout this period, Phaahla was an influential figure in the provincial ANC, with particular popularity in Sekhukhune. From 1994 to 1998, he served as Deputy Provincial Chairperson of the Limpopo ANC, deputising Ramathlodi and then George Mashamba. Mashamba was controversially elected as Provincial Chairperson in December 1996, after the frontrunners for the position – Phaahla and Peter Mokaba – declined nominations to stand, reportedly urged by President Nelson Mandela to allow an uncontested election for the sake of party unity. At the next provincial party elective conference in 1998, Phaahla ran to succeed Mashamba but was defeated by Ramathlodi, who returned to the chairmanship. Phaahla, however, remained a member of the ANC Provincial Executive Committee until 2001.

== Sports administration: 2000–2008 ==
In 2000, Phaahla retreated from legislative politics to work as a sports administrator, initially as the chief executive officer of the South African Sports Commission from 2000 to 2005; the commission was the overall regulator of all sports federations in the country, a forerunner of the South African Sports Confederation and Olympic Committee.

In August 2005, Phaahla was appointed to a three-year term as director-general in charge of the government unit that coordinated South Africa's preparations for hosting the 2010 FIFA World Cup. According to the Mail & Guardian, Phaahla was admired as a sports administrator and his appointment to the unit was "welcomed by all sides". During this period, he also served as acting director-general of the Department of Sports and Recreation. In January 2008, he asked to be relieved early from his contract as director-general in order to pursue opportunities in the private sector and dedicate more time to party-political work. The World Cup unit announced in March 2008 that he would leave at the end of that month.

== Luthuli House: 2008–2009 ==
Phaahla remained active in the ANC while working in sports administration, and in December 2007 he attended the party's 52nd National Conference in Polokwane, where Jacob Zuma was elected as ANC president. At the same conference, Phaahla was elected for the first time to a five-year term as a member of the ANC National Executive Committee, the party's top executive organ. His candidacy had been endorsed by the Congress of South African Trade Unions (Cosatu), and he received 1,726 votes from the roughly 4,000 delegates at the conference, making him the 40th-most popular of the 80 ordinary members elected to the committee.

After leaving the government, Phaahla worked at ANC's headquarters at Luthuli House in Johannesburg: from November 2008 until the end of April 2009, throughout the ANC's campaign in the 2009 general election, Phaahla was the head of the ANC presidency. In this capacity, he was in charge of Zuma's party office, as well as the office of Zuma's deputy, Kgalema Motlanthe, and that of the party's national chairperson, Baleka Mbete. In addition, Phaahla retained several business interests during this period; as of May 2009, he was a director in 21 companies, including several mining companies.

== Deputy ministerial posts: 2009–2021 ==
=== Rural Development and Land Reform: 2009–2010 ===
In the April 2009 election, Phaahla was elected for the first time to the National Assembly, the lower house of the South African Parliament. Zuma, newly elected as President of South Africa, announced his cabinet on 10 May, and Phaahla was appointed as Deputy Minister of Rural Development and Land Reform under Minister Gugile Nkwinti.

=== Arts and Culture: 2010–2014 ===
On 31 October 2010, Zuma announced a major cabinet reshuffle in which Phaahla was appointed to succeed Paul Mashatile as Deputy Minister of Arts and Culture; Mashatile was promoted to become minister in the portfolio. Phaahla remained in the ministry until the next general election in May 2014.

==== 2011 bid for ANC chairmanship ====
During his tenure in the Arts and Culture Ministry, in 2011, Phaala launched a campaign to succeed Premier Cassel Mathale as the Provincial Chairperson of the Limpopo ANC. As early as July 2011, he was identified as a member of an internal "lobby group" that supported Mathale's removal from the office. Both Phaala and Joe Mathebula were viewed as good candidates to stand against Mathale; it was ultimately Phaala who stood, with Mathebula as his running mate and Joe Maswanganyi on their slate for the Provincial Secretary position.

Their ticket was reportedly supported by the provincial branches of Cosatu and the South African Communist Party, as well as by President Zuma's faction of the national ANC. Indeed, the outcome of the race was viewed as important to Zuma's re-election bid at the ANC's 53rd National Conference, with Adam Habib and others believing that "If Phaahla wins, Limpopo will be in the president's hands." The Mail & Guardian also reported rumours that David Mabuza, the Premier of Mpumalanga and an ally of Zuma, had been funding Phaahla's campaign with Pat Ngomane's facilitation; Phaahla denied the rumours.

The elections were held at the University of Limpopo on 18 December 2011, and Phaahla narrowly lost to Mathale, receiving 519 votes to Mathale's 601. Soon after the elections, there were reports that Phaahla and his supporters had alleged electoral irregularities, though ANC electoral commissioner Mathole Motshekga said that the elections had been sound. Phaahla himself said later that week that he accepted his defeat, but his supporters – reportedly led by Falaza Mdaka – launched a formal complaint with ANC Secretary-General Gwede Mantashe, claiming that some of the votes had been invalid. The national ANC appointed a task team, led by Jeff Radebe, which was unable to find evidence to substantiate the complaint.

Despite his defeat in the provincial party, Phaahla was re-elected to the ANC National Executive Committee in December 2012. He was also touted as a possible candidate to serve as Premier of Limpopo after Mathale was removed from the office in 2013, though that position ultimately went to Stan Mathabatha.

=== Health: 2014–2021 ===
After the May 2014 election, Zuma appointed Phaahla to succeed Gwen Ramokgopa as Deputy Minister of Health, serving under Minister Aaron Motsoaledi. Over the next four years, and amid the political controversy that surrounded Zuma's second term, Phaahla became reputed as a relatively outspoken critic of the president. During ANC National Executive Committee meetings, he reportedly supported both of two motions of no confidence lodged against Zuma in his capacity as party president, one tabled by Derek Hanekom in November 2016 and another tabled by Joel Netshitenzhe in May 2017; on the latter occasion, Phaahla reportedly raised the ANC's poor performance during the 2016 municipal elections as a reason that Zuma should be removed from office. In addition, when Finance Minister Pravin Gordhan faced criminal charges in October 2016, Phaahla defended him; the Mail & Guardian quoted him as saying, without naming Zuma, that the charges were "a shame... This thing does not have credibility. I have no doubt in my mind that somebody has put pressure on [head prosecutor Shaun] Abrahams. This is about getting rid of Pravin."

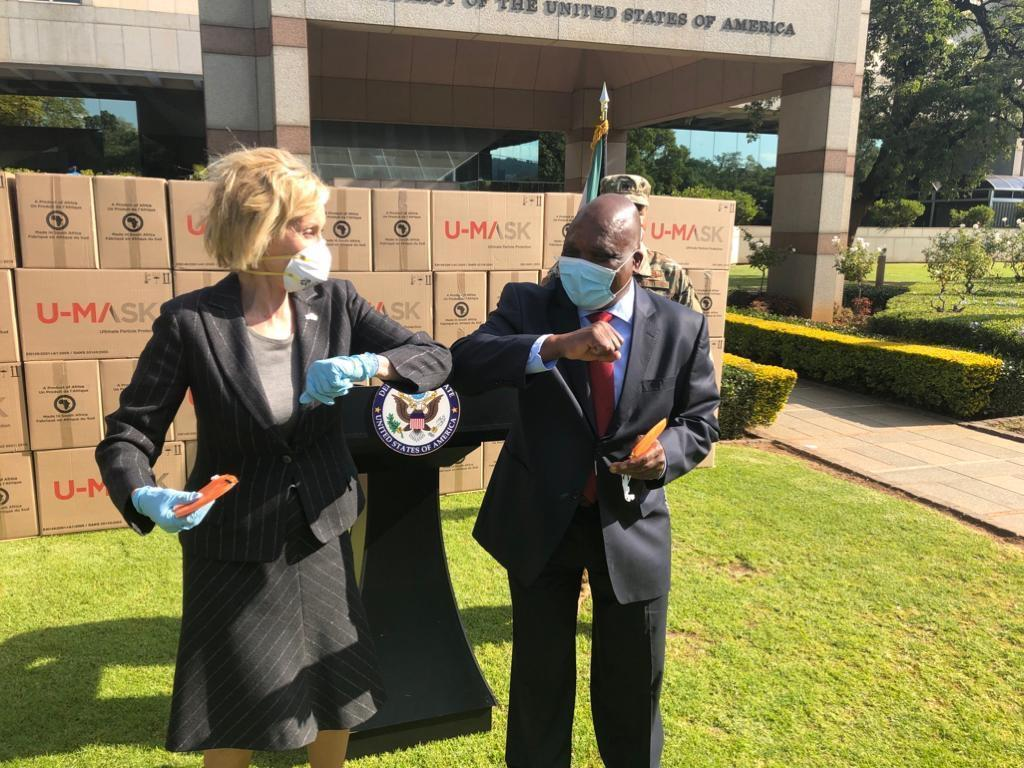
Phaahla with Ambassador Lana Marks at the United States Embassy in Pretoria during the COVID-19 pandemic in May 2020

At the ANC's 54th National Conference at Nasrec in December 2017, Phaahla failed to gain re-election to the ANC National Executive Committee. However, at the same elective conference, Zuma was succeeded as party president by Deputy President Cyril Ramaphosa, who was soon elected to replace Zuma as President of South Africa. Phaahla was retained as Deputy Minister of Health under Ramaphosa's cabinet; after the May 2019 election, he deputised Zweli Mkhize, who replaced Motsoaledi as Minister. During this period, the COVID-19 pandemic reached South Africa in the autumn of 2020.

== Minister of Health: 2021–2024 ==
On 5 August 2021, during a cabinet reshuffle announcement, Ramaphosa announced the resignation of Health Minister Mkhize, who had been placed on special leave due to his alleged involvement in the Digital Vibes scandal. Ramaphosa appointed Phaahla to replace Mkhize, with Sibongiseni Dhlomo as his deputy minister. The Treatment Action Campaign welcomed the departure of Mkhize and the appointment of Phaahla, who it said had "ably served as a deputy minister". The Business Day said that he was perceived as "the safe choice" for the position.

Phaahla took office during the third wave of COVID-19 infections in South Africa, and his first task was to oversee the roll-out of COVID-19 vaccines to the public. Less than a year later, on 22 June 2022, he gazetted a repeal of all remaining COVID-19-related regulations, including the mask mandate. Phaahla himself tested positive for COVID-19 a month after the repeal. In parallel to the COVID-19 response, Phaahla led the internal response to the Digital Vibes scandal, suspending six officials – including the Department of Health's director-general, Sandile Buthelezi – who were implicated in the scandal. In addition, Phaahla's ministry oversaw the launch of the second national sex work plan; the processing of the National Health Insurance Bill, which Phaahla called "revolutionary"; and the government response to the 2023 cholera outbreak in Gauteng.

During this period, the ANC's 55th National Conference was held in December 2022 and, despite performing poorly during the nominations stage, Phaahla was elected to return to the ANC National Executive Committee. He received 1,204 votes across roughly 4,000 ballots, tying with Khumbudzo Ntshavheni for the rank of 50th in the committee.

== Return to deputy ministry: 2024 ==
On 30 June 2024, President Ramaphosa returned Phaahla to his former post as Deputy Minister of Health under Minister Motsoaledi.
