= Sibongile Besani =

South African politician

Member of the National Assembly
- In office 22 May 2019 – 5 July 2019

Provincial Secretary of the Free State African National Congress
- In office July 2008 – June 2012
- In office February 2008 – July 2008 (acting)
- Deputy: Mamiki Qabathe
- Chairperson: Ace Magashule
- Preceded by: Charlotte Lobe
- Succeeded by: William Bulwane

Personal details
- Born: Sibongile Jeremia Besani; 11 July 1970 (age 55) Vredefort, Orange Free State; South Africa
- Party: African National Congress

Sibongile Jeremia Besani (born 11 July 1970) is a South African politician from the Free State. Since July 2019, he has worked for the African National Congress (ANC) as head of the party presidency. He has been a member of the ANC National Executive Committee since December 2017.

For a brief period between May and July 2019, Besani represented the ANC as a Member of the National Assembly of South Africa. He resigned from his seat when he was appointed as head of the ANC presidency, a full-time position based at Luthuli House in the office of ANC President Cyril Ramaphosa. He was also the interim coordinator of the ANC Youth League between July 2019 and April 2021.

Born in Vredefort, Besani is a former Provincial Secretary of the ANC's Free State branch. He held that office between July 2008 and June 2012 during the chairmanship of Ace Magashule.

== Early life and career ==
Besani was born on 11 July 1970 in Vredefort in the former Orange Free State.

A member of the African National Congress (ANC) in the Free State, he was elected as the provincial party's Deputy Provincial Secretary at an elective conference held in Bloemfontein on 25 June 2005. He served under Ace Magashule, the third-term Provincial Chairperson, and deputised Charlotte Lobe. In February 2008, Lobe resigned from her office, complaining, among other things, that Besani and Magashule had sidelined her; Besani subsequently became acting Provincial Secretary.

== ANC Provincial Secretary: 2008–2012 ==
At the provincial party's next elective conference, held in Parys on 24 July 2008, Besani was permanently elected, unopposed, to the secretariat. Magashule was re-elected to the chairmanship, and Mamiki Qabathe was elected as Besani's deputy.

=== Succession ===
In early 2012, as the next provincial elective conference approached, Besani was touted as a possible candidate to challenge Magashule for the party chairmanship. He became associated with the so-called Regime Change Group in the Free State, which also included outgoing Provincial Treasurer Mxolisi Dukwana, among others. Although this lobby had complaints about Magashule's leadership of the Free State, Besani also differed with Magashule in his stance in the ANC's ongoing national succession battle: Magashule supported the re-election bid of ANC President Jacob Zuma, while Besani supported calls for Zuma's removal.

Shortly before the provincial conference in June 2012, there were rumours that Besani had met with Magashule's camp and had subsequently switched sides, but he did not do so: with Dukwana and other Magashule opponents, he ultimately boycotted the conference, citing unaddressed electoral irregularities. William Bulwane was elected to succeed him as Provincial Secretary. Magashule, who was re-elected as Provincial Chairperson, said in subsequent weeks that he had reached out to Besani and Dukwana, saying:

We will never purge people... I am talking to both Dukwana and Besani despite [them] leading a spirited campaign to remove me as chairperson. The provincial working committee said we must go back to these comrades and understand why they are so angry and why do they think we are so horrible.

=== Aftermath ===
The outcomes of the June 2012 elective conference were subsequently challenged in court by a group of disgruntled party members. The case went to the Constitutional Court, where counsel for the complainants, Dali Mpofu, used Besani's secretarial reports to the ANC national leadership to argue that there had been severe irregularities in preparations for the elections. According to Mpofu, while secretary, Besani himself had reached a point where he believed there had been unlawful electoral conduct. The Constitutional Court ruled that the elections had indeed been unlawful, and, in December 2012, the national leadership appointed Besani to the task team that was established to provide interim leadership to the provincial party and to convene a re-run of the elections. However, the new elections in May 2013 had identical outcomes, with William Bulwane elected unopposed as Provincial Secretary.

Within a year, the Mail & Guardian said that Besani had "patched things up with Magashule". In 2017 and 2018, he was viewed as a possible candidate to run for a party leadership on another anti-Magashule ticket, now apparently selected as the running mate of Thabo Manyoni, but the leadership challenge did not transpire.

== Head of ANC Presidency: 2019–present ==
=== National Assembly ===
In December 2017, Besani attended the ANC's 54th National Conference at Nasrec, where he was elected to a five-year term on the party's National Executive Committee (NEC). By number of votes received, he was ranked 57th of the 80 ordinary members elected to the committee. In the next general election, held in May 2019, he was elected and sworn in to a seat in the National Assembly, ranked 89th on the ANC's national party list.

Besani served in the National Assembly for less than two months. On 1 July 2019, the ANC NEC appointed him as head of the party's presidency, a full-time position based out of ANC's headquarters at Luthuli House. He therefore resigned from the National Assembly on 5 July, ceding his seat to Constance Seoposengwe. His role involved supporting the party-political activities of ANC president Cyril Ramaphosa and his deputy, David Mabuza, as well as coordinating between the ANC presidency and the Presidency of South Africa. He succeeded Zizi Kodwa, who had been appointed as a deputy minister after the general election.

=== ANC Youth League task team ===
In late July 2019, the ANC NEC disbanded the incumbent leadership corps of the ANC Youth League (ANCYL), until then under league president Collen Maine, and appointed an interim national task team to take over the league and convene fresh leadership elections. Besani was appointed as coordinator of the task team – a position roughly equivalent to the secretarial office formerly held by Njabulo Nzuza – alongside convenor Tandi Mahambehlala.

On 6 February 2020, Besani announced that he had tendered his resignation from the league task team. In his resignation letter, Besani said that certain task team processes, including audits of local ANCYL branches, were "designed to exclude others, in particular myself as co-ordinator"; he also complained that, "A tendency to issue media statements without consulting the co-ordinator is gaining ground". In particular, his resignation followed a fiery ANCYL statement – issued in the names of Besani and Mahambehlala – that rejected the KwaZulu-Natal High Court's recent decision to issue an arrest warrant for former President Zuma, who had missed a court appearance in his corruption trial. Besani told News24, "It's not an issue of agreeing or disagreeing with the statement, I just wasn't consulted. They should have known better. It's ill-discipline. They must not make this organisation factional." Observers linked Besani's resignation to broader tensions between him and Mahambehlala: Mahambehlala was a vocal ally of Zuma, while he was viewed as a supporter of incumbent President Ramaphosa.

The ANCYL task team was unconcerned by Besani's resignation, with spokesperson Sizophila Mkhize saying, "Comrade Besani has been taking decisions alone without consulting either the convenor [Mahambehlala] or anyone of us in the task team. So, we don't want to really believe that the reasons he cited in his resignation letter are truly the reasons why he resigned". On 10 February, Magashule – now in his capacity as ANC Secretary-General – said that the NEC had rejected Besani's resignation and expected him to return to his coordinator role with immediate effect.

In September 2020, the task team increasingly came under pressure from ANCYL members who objected to the advanced age of the interim leaders, as well as to delays in convening the league's next elective conference. Besani said that the task team's work had been obstructed by the COVID-19 pandemic but that the league would hold elections no later than 31 March 2021. This did not occur, and in April 2021, the NEC announced that it would disband and reconstitute the task team. In the new body, Besani was replaced as coordinator by Joy Maimela, while Nonceba Mhlauli replaced Mahambehlala as convenor.

=== Reappointment ===
At the ANC's 55th National Conference in December 2022, Besani was re-elected to the NEC with 1,546 votes across roughly 4,000 ballots, making him the 20th-most popular member of the new committee. The new NEC reappointed him as head of presidency, and he was also elected to the party's 20-member National Working Committee.

== Personal life and business interests ==
Besani is married and has children.

Between 2009 and 2011, he was a director of Mpaki Investments, which in 2012 was investigated for allegedly submitting fraudulent VAT claims to the South African Revenue Service. As of 2020, the case remained under consideration by the National Prosecuting Authority. Besani said that he had not been questioned by the police and had no knowledge of the alleged crimes, which were alleged to have taken place before he joined the company.
