= Falaza Mdaka =

South African politician

Falaza Mdaka MPL

Member of the Limpopo Provincial Legislature
- Incumbent
- Assumed office 21 May 2014

Executive Mayor of Vhembe
- In office 2007–2011
- Preceded by: Irene Mutsila
- Succeeded by: Florence Radzilani

Personal details
- Citizenship: South Africa
- Party: African National Congress

Falaza Philemon Mdaka is a South African politician who has represented the African National Congress (ANC) in the Limpopo Provincial Legislature since 2014. He was formerly the Executive Mayor of Vhembe District Municipality from 2007 to 2011 and served as Regional Chairperson of the ANC's Vhembe branch for two terms until 2012.

== Local political career ==
Local newspaper Die Zoutpansberger reported that Mdaka was a member of Ximoko before joining the ANC, but Mdaka denied this. He served two terms as Regional Chairperson of the ANC's regional branch in Vhembe: he was in that office by 2007, and in 2009 he comfortably won re-election despite a challenge to his incumbency by Moses Tseli. Simultaneously, he was the Executive Mayor of Vhembe District Municipality from 2007 until 2011.

In April 2011, the Sowetan reported that the ANC would not nominate Mdaka for a second term as mayor after the local elections to be held in May that year. According to the newspaper, the provincial leadership of the party intended to replace Mdaka with a candidate more strongly aligned to Cassel Mathale, then the ANC's Provincial Chairperson in Limpopo, and Julius Malema, then the President of the ANC Youth League. Mdaka was perceived as sympathetic to Malema's rival, Lehlogonolo Masoga. After the May 2011 election, Mdaka was succeeded as mayor by Florence Radzilani, though he remained a local councillor in Vhembe.

At the Limpopo ANC's next provincial elective conference in December 2011, Mdaka opposed Cassel Mathale's bid for re-election and instead supported Joe Phaahla's campaign to be elected ANC Provincial Chairperson. Phaahla's campaign was aligned to ANC President Jacob Zuma but nonetheless failed to oust Mathale. Phaahla's supporters subsequently alleged that Mathale had won by dint of electoral irregularities at the conference; the Mail & Guardian described Mdaka, in his capacity as Vhembe Regional Chairperson, as the "main complainant". However, in early 2012, Mdaka distanced himself from the matter, reportedly saying that he had signed his name to the complaint without reading it first.

== Provincial political career ==
In May 2012, Mdaka stood for re-election as ANC Regional Chairperson in Vhembe but was defeated by Mutale Mayor Tshitereke Matibe, who received 177 votes against his 143. However, in March 2013, he was appointed to more senior office when the ANC National Executive Committee appointed him at the head of an interim task team that led the Limpopo branch of the ANC until leadership elections could be held to replace Mathale and other provincial leaders who had been removed from office.

In the 2014 general election, Mdaka was elected to the Limpopo Provincial Legislature, ranked second on the ANC's provincial party list. He was also appointed Majority Chief Whip in the legislature. In 2018, Mdaka launched an abortive campaign to oust Stan Mathabatha, then the Premier of Limpopo, from his position as ANC Provincial Chairperson in Limpopo; he withdrew from the race, but was elected to a four-year term as an ordinary member of the ANC Provincial Executive Committee. In the 2019 general election, Mdaka was re-elected to his legislative seat, ranked 23rd on the ANC's party list; he was succeeded as Chief Whip by Essob Mokgonyana. He was re-elected to the ANC Provincial Executive Committee in 2022.
