= Irene Mutsila =

South African politician (1949–2017)

Mayor of Vhembe
- In office March 2006 – July 2007
- Succeeded by: Falaza Mdaka

Member of the National Assembly
- In office June 1999 – April 2004
- Constituency: Northern Province

Delegate to the National Council of Provinces

Assembly Member for Northern Transvaal
- In office May 1994 – June 1999

Personal details
- Born: 5 June 1949 Sibasa, Northern Transvaal; Union of South Africa
- Died: 29 July 2017 (aged 68) Polokwane, Limpopo; Republic of South Africa
- Party: African National Congress

Irene Mutsila (5 June 1949 – 29 July 2017) was a South African politician from Limpopo. Formerly an anti-apartheid activist and poet, she was the first woman mayor of Vhembe District Municipality from 2006 to 2007. Before that, she represented the African National Congress (ANC) in the National Council of Provinces from 1994 to 1999 and in the National Assembly from 1999 to 2004.

== Early life and activism ==
Mutsila was born on 5 June 1949 in Sibasa outside Thohoyandou in the former Northern Transvaal. She was active in the anti-apartheid movement and a veteran of the ANC Women's League. She was also a poet and published in Staffrider. After the end of apartheid, she served in the Provincial Executive Committee of the ANC's Limpopo branch.

== Legislative career ==
In South Africa's first post-apartheid elections in 1994, Mutsila was elected to an ANC seat in the Northern Transvaal caucus of the Senate (later the National Council of Provinces). After a term there, she was elected to the National Assembly in the 1999 general election, again serving the Northern Transvaal (by then renamed Northern Province).

== Mayor of Vhembe: 2006–2007 ==
In mid-March 2006, after the 2006 local elections, Mutsila was elected as the first female executive mayor of Limpopo's Vhembe District Municipality. However, her relationship with the ANC-controlled municipal council quickly deteriorated into what a local newspaper called a "power struggle". The situation worsened in May 2007, when she appointed a new municipal manager. Complaining that Mutsila had not consulted them before making the appointment, the council resolved to suspend her in late June 2007.

The council subsequently alleged that the appointment of the municipal manager had been corrupt and grossly irregular. In addition, it said that Mutsila had defied the council's instruction to her to revoke the appointment. In late July 2007, the council passed a motion of no-confidence in Mutsila, removing her from office and replacing her with ANC regional chairperson Falaza Mdaka.

== Death ==
Mutsila died on 29 July 2017 at a private hospital in Polokwane following a short illness. President Jacob Zuma granted her a special provincial official funeral.
