= Benny Boshielo =

South African politician and businessman

Provincial Secretary of the Limpopo African National Congress
- In office 1998–2001
- Deputy: Jerry Ndou
- Chairperson: Ngoako Ramatlhodi
- Preceded by: Collins Chabane
- Succeeded by: Cassel Mathale

Member of the Limpopo Executive Council for Transport
- In office 1997–1998
- Premier: Ngoako Ramatlhodi
- Preceded by: Johan Kriek
- Succeeded by: Aaron Motsoaledi

Personal details
- Born: Legodi Bernard Boshielo; 1962 or 1963 (age 62–63)
- Party: African National Congress
- Spouse: Polly Boshielo

Legodi Bernard "Benny" Boshielo (born 1962 or 1963) is a South African businessman and former politician from Limpopo. Formerly a prominent member of the African National Congress (ANC), he resigned from the Limpopo government in 2012 to work for African Rainbow Minerals.

== Life and career ==
Born in 1962 or 1963, Boshielo is from present-day Limpopo. He attended the University of the North, graduating in 1987 with a Bachelor of Arts and a diploma in education. Thereafter he was a teacher for eight months before he moved abroad to pursue a Master's degree in education in Amsterdam.

In the post-apartheid period, Boshielo served stints as a Member of the Provincial Legislature in Limpopo, as Provincial Secretary of the Limpopo ANC, as chairperson of the council of his alma mater, and as chief executive officer of Limpopo Tourism and Parks. During his time in the Limpopo Provincial Legislature, he served briefly as Member of the Executive Council for Transport; he was appointed to that post in July 1997 by Premier Ngoako Ramatlhodi, but he resigned in 1998 when he was elected to the full-time ANC provincial secretary position.

After the 2009 general election, he became director-general in the Limpopo Department of Education, then led by provincial minister Dickson Masemola, but he resigned in July 2011. Thereafter he became an executive at Patrice Motsepe's African Rainbow Minerals (ARM); in June 2012, he was promoted to executive for corporate affairs at ARM Platinum, in which capacity he reported directly to ARM's chief executive officer.

== Corruption allegations ==
Boshielo's brief tenure at the Limpopo Education Department was beset by corruption allegations. Alleged mismanagement under his tenure was first flagged by the Auditor General shortly after Boshielo's departure from the department in 2011. In 2012, the Mail & Guardian reported that the Special Investigating Unit was investigating department officials for possible tender corruption in a major textbook contract with EduSolutions; a department whistleblower alleged, and Boshielo denied, that Boshielo had approved the contract irregularly. Later that year the Mail & Guardian reported on alleged corruption in school nutrition programme contracts under Boshielo. Finally, and separately, in September 2014, Boshielo and another department official were arrested for fraud of R70 million in connection with a Hawks investigation into the award of contracts for the supply of mobile classrooms.

== Personal life ==
He is married to politician Polly Boshielo.
