= Charlotte Lobe =

South African politician and diplomat (born 1973)

Member of the Free State Provincial Legislature
- In office May 2004 – October 2008

Provincial Secretary of the Free State African National Congress
- In office June 2005 – February 2008
- Chairperson: Ace Magashule
- Preceded by: Pat Matosa
- Succeeded by: Sibongile Besani

Member of the National Assembly
- In office June 1999 – April 2004

Personal details
- Born: Madiepetsane Charlotte Pheko; 2 July 1973 (age 53)
- Citizenship: South Africa
- Party: African National Congress
- Other political affiliations: Congress of the People (2008–2010 only)
- Relations: Gertrude Mothupi (sister)
- Education: University of the Free State

Madiepetsane Charlotte Lobe (née Pheko; born 2 July 1973) is a South African politician, diplomat and civil servant who represented the African National Congress (ANC) in the National Assembly from 1999 to 2004 and in the Free State Provincial Legislature from 2004 to 2008. In October 2008, she defected to the Congress of the People (COPE), a newly formed breakaway party.

Lobe served as General-Secretary of COPE until she was removed from that office in October 2010. She has since rejoined the ANC. After several years of employment in public administration, in July 2022 she embarked on a posting as South African High Commissioner to Singapore. She is also a former Provincial Secretary of the ANC's Free State branch and a former member of the ANC's National Executive Committee.

== Early life and education ==
Lobe was born on 2 July 1973. During apartheid, Lobe and her sister, Gertrude, were active in the anti-apartheid movement in the former Orange Free State. Their father, a policeman, had left their mother, and Lobe described their political activity as a form of rebellion against him. They joined the Botshabelo Students Congress and the Botshabelo Youth Congress in 1987.

Lobe has a master's degree in governance and political transformation from the University of the Free State.

== Career in government: 1996–2008 ==
After apartheid ended, Lobe served as a local councillor from 1996 to 1999. In the 1999 general election, she was elected to an ANC seat in the National Assembly, where she served until 2004. In the 2004 general election, she was elected to an ANC seat in the Free State Provincial Legislature.

At the same time, Lobe rose through the ranks of the ANC and the ANC Women's League. She served as Deputy Provincial Secretary of the ANC's Free State branch from 2002 to 2005, deputising Pat Matosa, and in June 2005 she was elected to succeed Matosa as Provincial Secretary. In that capacity she served under Provincial Chairperson Ace Magashule, with Sibongile Besani as her deputy. She was the first woman to hold the office, which she filled while retaining her legislative seat.

== Congress of the People: 2008–2010 ==
=== Defection ===
In December 2007 in Polokwane, the ANC's 52nd National Conference elected Lobe to a five-year term on the ANC National Executive Committee (NEC), the party's most senior executive organ. By number of votes received, she was ranked 67th of the 80 ordinary members elected, receiving 1,494 votes from among the roughly 3,900 voting delegates. However, at the same conference, President Thabo Mbeki was ousted from the ANC presidency by Jacob Zuma, intensifying a serious rift in the party. Lobe later said:

There were problems even before Polokwane, but the previous ANC leadership was able to unite members behind the ANC vision. I have no problem with the leadership that was elected at the national conference in Polokwane. I have a problem with its inability to unite the ANC.

In February 2008, Lobe resigned as Provincial Secretary of the Free State ANC, saying that she disagreed with how certain organisational matters had been handled by the provincial party leadership. In June, the Mail & Guardian published excerpts from Lobe's resignation letter, in which she said that, in 2008, the ANC Provincial Executive Committee had "indulged itself in matters that I personally think are not in the interest of strengthening the ANC, but has the potential of dividing the organisation". She also said that Sibongile Besani, her deputy, had colluded with Magashule as part of a scheme of "consolidated efforts to render me useless by sidelining me from my core function", concluding that the current provincial leadership was "not conducive, not only to my conscience, but also to my health".

However, Lobe retained her membership in the NEC until 15 October 2008, when she announced her resignation from that position. She also resigned from the Free State Provincial Legislature. According to Lobe, she had retained her NEC membership in the hope that the NEC would address the issues she had raised about the party's provincial structures, but the NEC had failed to do so. She said that her resignation was based "purely on principle" and that she had decided she would "rather join those who speak out and seek alternative ways of protecting the Constitution of South Africa".

At that time, Mbhazima Shilowa and Mosiuoa Lekota, both allies of Mbeki, had already broken away from the ANC and announced their intention to form a rival political party, a project which became the Congress of the People (COPE). The media immediately speculated that Lobe would join them. Indeed, COPE held its founding congress a fortnight after Lobe's resignation, and she became interim General-Secretary, and then full General-Secretary, of the new party.

=== Removal ===
In 2010, a series of media reports suggested that Lobe had become delinquent in her duties as COPE General-Secretary. At that time, the party was riven by a leadership contest between Lekota and Shilowa, in which Lobe was viewed as aligned to Shilowa; sources told the Sunday Times that Lobe had lost interest in her job due to the strain of the infighting. The Sunday Times additionally claimed that Lobe had attempted to resign from COPE earlier in 2010 but had been convinced not to.

On 8 October 2010, COPE's national leadership resolved to replace Lobe with Deidre Carter, a Lekota supporter, until the party's next elective congress. Party spokesman Phillip Dexter said that the party had "no idea" where Lobe had been for the last few months. Although her time at COPE was short-lived, Lobe later said that she was not ashamed of her defection:

I believed it was the correct move. It was in the interest of my people. It has been an extremely difficult journey, and it was even more difficult to be reintegrated. But I have no regrets: I am a product of this journey; I am shaped by my experiences. With the incidents that were taking place [during the Zuma presidency, later investigated by the Zondo Commission] I feel vindicated because people now understand why some of us took that decision at the time. Maybe I should have stayed in the ANC and fought the battles within the ANC with the hope that we will eventually win. Truth be told, most of us did not leave the ANC: the ANC left us. Maybe I should have kept quiet like many did, but that is not an option for me.

== Civil service ==
After Lobe was removed from the COPE leadership, she remained aloof from frontline politics. In addition, she later said that she had virtually been "blacklisted... in the private sector and in government because of my history of leaving the ANC". She was unemployed until 2012, when she got part-time work at the University of the Free State as a coordinator for the university's community learning programme. She later became a deputy director at the parliamentary office of the Independent Police Investigative Directorate, a job for which she said she applied under her maiden name and without leaning on her political connections.

In 2014 in Cape Town, Lobe ran into Susan Shabangu, an ANC politician soon to be appointed as Minister in the Presidency for Women. At Shabangu's encouragement, Lobe joined the Department of Women as a media liaison. She later transferred to the Department of International Relations and Cooperation (DIRCO), where she served as chief director for transformation and transversal programmes. In March 2019, she was additionally appointed as DIRCO's acting chief operations officer, an office she retained as of October 2020.

=== High Commission: 2021–present ===
Lobe rejoined the ANC and in 2021 was appointed as South African High Commissioner to Singapore by Zuma's successor, President Cyril Ramaphosa. She presented her credentials in Singapore in July 2022.
