= Sanny Ndhlovu =

South African politician

Sanny Ndhlovu MPL

Permanent Delegate to the National Council of Provinces

Assembly Member for Limpopo
- Incumbent
- Assumed office 15 June 2024

Personal details
- Born: 5 September 1974 (age 51)
- Party: African National Congress
- Profession: Politician

Sanny Ndhlovu (born 5 September 1974) is a South African politician from Limpopo. She has represented the African National Congress (ANC) in the National Council of Provinces since June 2024.

== Life and career ==
One of four sisters, Ndhlovu was born on 5 September 1974 in Limpopo. She joined the ANC Youth League during the negotiations to end apartheid. She also worked as a civil servant—including for a period as a field worker soliciting applications for RDP housing in Northam—and was active in the South African Municipal Workers' Union, first as a shop steward and later in the union's national leadership.

Ndhlovu entered government as an ANC councillor in the Thabazimbi Local Municipality. At a party conference in June 2022, she was elected to the ANC's Provincial Executive Committee in Limpopo.

In the May 2024 general election, she was ranked 54th on the ANC's provincial party list in Limpopo, and she was elected to a seat in the Limpopo delegation to the National Council of Provinces. She was also elected to chair Parliament's Select Committee on Finance and Joint Standing Committee on the Financial Management of Parliament. She was re-elected to the ANC Provincial Executive Committee in March 2026.
