= Bella Kupa =

South African politician

Bella Kupa MPL

Member of the Limpopo Provincial Legislature
- Incumbent
- Assumed office 14 June 2024

Personal details
- Born: 27 July 1972 (age 53)
- Party: African National Congress
- Profession: Politician

Constance Ramadimetja "Bella" Kupa (born 27 July 1972), also known as Bella Kupa-Mabuza, is a South African politician from Limpopo. Formerly the mayor of Ephraim Mogale Local Municipality between 2016 and 2018, she has represented the African National Congress (ANC) in the Limpopo Provincial Legislature since June 2024.

== Life and career ==
Kupa was born on 27 July 1972. She began her political career in the ANC and ANC Youth League in Marble Hall, ultimately rising to the position of regional treasurer of the ANC's branch in Sekukhune.

In the August 2016 local elections, she was elected as mayor of Ephraim Mogale Local Municipality in Marble Hall. However, the provincial ANC ordered her to resign the mayoral office in December 2018 after it emerged that the municipality under Kupa's leadership had invested R82 million in VBS Bank.

Thereafter she represented the ANC as a councillor and Member of the Mayoral Committee in Sekhukhune District Municipality. During her tenure in Sekukhune, in June 2022, she was also elected to the Provincial Executive Committee of the ANC's Limpopo branch.

In the May 2024 general election, Kupa was elected to represent the ANC in the Limpopo Provincial Legislature, ranked sixth on the provincial party list. She was also elected as chairperson of the legislature's Portfolio Committee on Agriculture and Rural Development. At the ANC's next provincial elective conference in March 2026, she was re-elected to the party's Provincial Executive Committee and additionally appointed to its Provincial Working Committee.
