= Simon Mathe =

South African politician and trade unionist

Simon Mathe MPL

Member of the Limpopo Provincial Legislature
- Incumbent
- Assumed office 22 May 2019

Personal details
- Citizenship: South Africa
- Party: African National Congress

Simon Matsobane Mathe is a South African politician and trade unionist who has represented the African National Congress (ANC) in the Limpopo Provincial Legislature since 2019. He was formerly the General Secretary of the South African Municipal Workers' Union (SAMWU) from December 2015 until April 2019, when he and the union's other leaders were removed in a vote of no confidence.

== Career in SAMWU ==
Mathe entered politics through SAMWU, an affiliate of the ANC-allied Congress of South African Trade Unions. He was formerly SAMWU's Provincial Secretary in Limpopo and by 2015 was the Deputy General Secretary of the national union. In late 2015, the incumbent General Secretary, Walter Theledi, was suspended from his office amid allegations of financial mismanagement; SAMWU's executive committee voted in December 2015 to replace him with Mathe.

Mathe subsequently served as national SAMWU General Secretary from 2015 to 2019. In 2018, his leadership corps controversially amended the union's constitution to extend their own terms in office from three years to five years, although Mathe said that the amendment was the result of a resolution of SAMWU's national congress. More generally, Mathe presided over what the Mail & Guardian called a "leadership crisis" in the union, and in early 2019 the labour registrar applied to have SAMWU placed under administration for alleged violations of the Labour Relations Act. In April 2019, at a SAMWU executive committee meeting in Bloemfontein, five of the union's nine provincial branches supported a motion of no confidence in the incumbent national leadership. Mathe said that he had resigned before the motion was voted on, but sources said that his resignation was prompted by the motion. He was replaced as General Secretary by Koena Ramatlou.

== Career in the provincial legislature ==
In the 2019 general election, which took place shortly after Mathe's removal from his SAMWU office, Mathe was elected to an ANC seat in the Limpopo Provincial Legislature, ranked 31st on the ANC's provincial party list. He has also been elected to two consecutive four-year terms on the Limpopo ANC's Provincial Executive Committee in June 2018 and June 2022.
