= Essob Mokgonyana =

South African politician and trade unionist

Essob Mokgonyana MPL

Member of the Limpopo Provincial Legislature
- Incumbent
- Assumed office 22 May 2019

Personal details
- Citizenship: South Africa
- Party: African National Congress
- Other political affiliations: Congress of South African Trade Unions

Essob Mmanoko Mokgonyana, sometimes misspelled Essop Mokgonyane, is a South African politician and trade unionist who has served as Chief Whip of the Majority Party in the Limpopo Provincial Legislature since 2019. He represents the African National Congress (ANC) in that capacity. He previously chaired the Limpopo branch of the Congress of South African Trade Unions (COSATU), an ANC ally, from 2012 to 2019.

Mokgonyana gained prominence as a regional leader of COSATU and the affiliated National Union of Mineworkers in Limpopo province. In May 2009, he was elected Provincial Deputy Chairperson of COSATU's Limpopo branch, deputising Provincial Chairperson Ronnie Moroatshehla. At the union's next provincial elective conference in August 2012, he successfully challenged Moroatshehla in a vote and was elected COSATU Provincial Chairperson. At that time he was viewed as politically aligned to incumbent ANC President Jacob Zuma. He was re-elected unopposed to a second term in July 2015 and to a third term in July 2018.

In the 2019 general election, Mokgonyana was elected to the Limpopo Provincial Legislature, ranked 17th on the ANC's provincial party list. After the election, on 11 July 2019, the legislature appointed him to succeed Falaza Mdaka as Majority Chief Whip. After his election to the legislative office, Mokgonyana vacated the COSATU chairmanship and he was succeeded in that capacity by Calvin Tshamano later in July. In June 2022, he was elected to a four-year term on the Limpopo ANC's Provincial Executive Committee.
