= Kedibone Lebea-Olaiya =

South African politician

Kedibone Lebea-Olaiya MPL

Member of the Limpopo Provincial Legislature
- Incumbent
- Assumed office 22 May 2019

Personal details
- Citizenship: South Africa
- Party: African National Congress

Kedibone Lebea is a South African politician who has represented the African National Congress (ANC) in the Limpopo Provincial Legislature since 2019. She was elected to her seat in the 2019 general election, ranked 18th on the ANC's party list. She is active in the ANC's Peter Mokaba regional branch in Capricorn District and in June 2022 was elected to a four-year term on the Provincial Executive Committee of the party's Limpopo branch.
