= Ka Shabangu =

South African politician and activist

Personal details
- Born: 1954 or 1955 (age 71–72)
- Citizenship: South Africa
- Party: African National Congress

Johannes Mandla "Ka" Shabangu (born 1954 or 1955) is a South African politician and former anti-apartheid activist. He joined Umkhonto we Sizwe (MK) in the aftermath of the 1976 Soweto uprising, and in 1981 he was convicted of high treason and a grenade attack on a black policeman. He spent two years on death row before his death sentence was commuted to life imprisonment in 1983; he was released from Robben Island in the early 1990s.

After the end of apartheid, Shabangu represented the ANC in the National Assembly during the first democratic Parliament and served two terms as provincial treasurer of the party's Mpumalanga branch. In later years, he was a member of the inaugural steering committee of the MK Military Veterans' Council.

== Early life and activism ==
Shabangu was born in 1954 or 1955. He left South Africa in the aftermath of the 1976 Soweto uprising and joined MK for military training abroad.

=== Treason conviction: 1981 ===
After he returned to South Africa as an MK operative, Shabangu was arrested and charged with high treason in 1981. The Pretoria Supreme Court heard the case against Shabangu and two other ANC members, David Moise and Anthony Tsotsobe, who are sometimes known collectively as the "Sasol three".

On 18 August 1981, all three were found guilty of high treason on account of their membership in the ANC and participation in terrorism (though none of the incidents resulted in any deaths). While Moise was convicted of sabotage at a Sasol plant in 1980 and Tsotsobe of involvement in several bombings and attacks on policemen, Shabangu was found guilty of having thrown a grenade into the home of a black policeman in Soweto and of having kept a "death list" which allegedly identified seven black opponents of the ANC as targets for assassination. All three defendants were sentenced to hang. Several people were arrested in protests outside the Palace of Justice after the sentence was handed down.

The outcome was particularly controversial because the state's case rested on signed confessions which the defendants said had been extracted under torture. Judge Charl Theron nonetheless ruled that the confessions were admissible and said that he had based his decision on the strength of the confessions. Following an international campaign, which received the endorsement of the United Nations Commission on Human Rights and of the United Nations Security Council, the defendants' sentences were commuted to life imprisonment in June 1983. Shabangu and the others served their sentences on Robben Island until they were released in the early 1990s due to advances in the negotiations to end apartheid.

=== Assassination attempt: 1992 ===
Late at night on 10 November 1992, a group of MK operatives, armed with hand grenades and an AK-47, attacked Shabangu's house in Lekazi, near Nelspruit, Eastern Transvaal. The house's inhabitants sustained only mild injuries. Three people – Derrick Skosana and brothers Joe and Conrad Nkuna – were found guilty of attempted murder for having planned and carried out the attack; they were sentenced to several years' imprisonment.

However, at Truth and Reconciliation Commission hearings in Nelspruit in mid-1997, the three culprits applied for amnesty on the grounds that the attempt on Shabangu's life had been politically motivated. The most senior among them was Joe Nkuna, the ANC's former regional secretary in the Eastern Transvaal. Nkuna said that he had himself been severely injured in an ambush in October 1991 and that he had believed Nkuna, in collaboration with the police, to be responsible. Far more inflammatory, Nkuna said that he had discussed the matter with MK commander and communist stalwart Chris Hani; he said that Hani had given a direct order to "eliminate" Nkuna and other suspected double agents.

The Truth and Reconciliation Commission said that Nkuna's account could not be "rejected as untrue", nor could it be proved, since Hani had died in 1993. It ruled that the attack was politically motivated and granted amnesty to all three applicants. The ANC was highly critical of the decision and denied that Hani had sanctioned the attack.

== Post-apartheid career ==
In South Africa's first post-apartheid elections in 1994, Shabangu was elected to represent the ANC in the National Assembly, the lower house of the new South African Parliament. He did not complete his term in the seat. However, also in 1994, Shabangu was elected as the provincial treasurer of the ANC's Mpumalanga branch (then still called Eastern Transvaal), serving under provincial chairperson Mathews Phosa; he served two terms in that office. Ahead of the ANC's 50th National Conference in 1997, the Mpumalanga ANC nominated Shabangu to stand for election to the ANC National Executive Committee, although he was not ultimately elected.

=== Dolphin corruption scandal ===
After his second term ended, he served as the ANC's provincial organiser in Mpumalanga. While in that position, he was implicated in a major and protracted corruption scandal in the province, centred on the relationship between the ANC and the Dolphin Group, a Dubai-based company that had a lucrative contract with the Mpumalanga Parks Board (a 25-year commercial development monopoly in Mpumalanga's game parks). In January 1999, the Mail & Guardian reported on leaks from an investigation conducted by the Special Investigative Unit, which had apparently found that individual ANC and parks officials had received kickbacks through an array of front companies. Shabangu was named as having accepted money that the ANC used to hold its 1996 provincial elective conference in Secunda (at which Shabangu had been re-elected as treasurer), while his wife, then a provincial government official, had allegedly received a monthly vehicle allowance.

In subsequent weeks, the former parks board chief executive alleged that Shabangu had been instrumental in introducing Dolphin to the parks board and in establishing the secret front companies. The board had irregularly funded trips Shabangu made to Dubai and London in 1996, and the board's suspended finance director said that the board had leased a house for him in upmarket Sandton. In addition, Dolphin executives said that Shabangu had solicited and received a R50,000 cash donation for the ANC, as a "gesture of goodwill" to demonstrate the company's commitment, but the ANC said that Shabangu had neither declared nor handed over the money to the party. The ANC said that it would investigate Shabangu's involvement.

=== MK Veterans' Council ===
During the second term of President Jacob Zuma, Shabangu was a member of the steering committee of the MK Military Veterans' Council, established in 2017 in direct competition with the vociferously pro-Zuma MK Military Veterans' Association (MKMVA). In this capacity, he was an outspoken critic of MKMVA and its activities, which he described as anti-democratic, as well as of the Zuma-led top leadership of the mainstream ANC.
