= Ezra Letsoalo =

South African politician

Ezra Letsoalo MPL

Member of the Gauteng Provincial Legislature
- Incumbent
- Assumed office 22 May 2019

Personal details
- Citizenship: South Africa
- Party: African National Congress

Boitumelo Ezra Letsoalo is a South African politician who has represented the African National Congress (ANC) in the Gauteng Provincial Legislature since 2019. Formerly an ANC Youth League activist in Tshwane, he has been a member of the Provincial Executive Committee of the ANC's Gauteng branch since 2018.

== Political career ==
Letsoalo, a trained legal practitioner (Advocate of the High Court of South Africa) was formerly the Deputy Regional Chairperson of the ANC Youth League's branch in Tshwane, Gauteng; he served under Regional Chairperson Lesego Makhubela. He did not stand for reelection to that office in October 2017. However, the following year, in July 2018, he was elected to a four-year term as a member of the Provincial Executive Committee of the mainstream ANC in Gauteng.

In the 2019 general election, he was elected for the first time to a seat in the Gauteng Provincial Legislature, ranked 11th on the ANC's provincial party list. He was re-elected to the Provincial Executive Committee in July 2022.
