= Alphina Ndlovana =

South African politician

Alphina Ndlovana MPL

Member of the Gauteng Provincial Legislature
- Incumbent
- Assumed office 22 May 2019

Personal details
- Born: 25 August 1957 (age 69) Mamelodi, Transvaal; Union of South Africa
- Party: African National Congress
- Education: University of Pretoria; University of Johannesburg

Alphina Anna "Gogo" Ndlovana (born 25 August 1957) is a South African politician who has represented the African National Congress (ANC) in the Gauteng Provincial Legislature since 2019. A teacher by training, she was formerly a local councilor in the City of Tshwane Metropolitan Municipality and, before that, a public servant in the Mpumalanga Department of Education.

== Early life and career ==
Ndlovana was born on 25 August 1957 in Mamelodi. She became politically active through the anti-apartheid movement while a student at Vlakfontein High School. While teaching at Rethabile High School in Mamelodi, she became co-founder of Mamelodi Teachers Union. In addition to her teaching certificate, she has a Bachelor's degree from the University of Pretoria and a Master's degree in educational management from the University of Johannesburg.

After the end of apartheid in 1994, she was recruited to the Mpumalanga Department of Education, where she rose to a senior position as an education specialist. Mpumalanga Premier David Mabuza suspended her from the department in mid-1999 after an internal inquiry found that she was partly responsible for fraudulently inflating the province's matric results by 20%.

== Political career ==
Ndlovana formerly served as a proportional-representation councillor in the City of Tshwane Metropolitan Municipality. She is an active member of the ANC Women's League in Gauteng, and she was elected to a four-year term on the Provincial Executive Committee of the ANC's Gauteng branch in July 2018. In the general election the following year, she was elected to the Gauteng Provincial Legislature, ranked 14th on the ANC's provincial party list. She was re-elected to the ANC's Provincial Executive Committee in 2022.

== Personal life ==
She has three sons.
