= Reuben Madadzhe =

South African politician

Provincial Secretary of the African National Congress in Limpopo
- Incumbent
- Assumed office June 2022
- Deputy: Basikopo Makamu
- Chairperson: Stan Mathabatha
- Preceded by: Soviet Lekganyane

Personal details
- Born: Reuben Madadzhe Madzikuse, Vhembe District, Limpopo
- Party: African National Congress
- Parent: Chief Rudzani Philemon Madadzhe (father)

Reuben Madadzhe is a South African traditional leader and politician serving as the Provincial Secretary of the African National Congress (ANC) in Limpopo since June 2022. He is also the chief ("Vhamusanda") of the Madzikuse area in Tshikonelo, Vhembe District. Madadzhe has held various leadership roles within the ANC and its affiliated structures and is a prominent figure in the political and traditional affairs of the Vhembe region. He began being involved in politics in 1995 as a member of the Congress of South African Students (COSAS). During his student years, he served as the president of the Student Representative Council (SRC) at Makhado College. He later rose within the ranks of the African National Congress Youth League (ANCYL), where he served as the secretary of the league’s Thulamela subregion in 2007. In 2009, Madadzhe was elected as the ANCYL's Vhembe regional secretary, a position that further strengthened his role as a youth leader in Limpopo politics.

He was inaugurated as chief on 2 December 2017, succeeding his late father, Chief Rudzani Philemon Madadzhe Mphaphuli. Upon his inauguration, Madadzhe was given the traditional name Ntikedzeni, which means "support me."

In June 2022, Madadzhe was elected as the Secretary of the ANC in Limpopo during the party’s provincial conference, held at The Ranch Hotel outside Polokwane. His election came at a time when the ANC in Limpopo emphasized improving service delivery and addressing governance challenges in the province.

== Allegations of corruption and public response ==
In March 2025, Madadzhe, as ANC Limpopo provincial secretary, responded to allegations related to a luxury vehicle valued at R1.8 million after social media posts claimed that the vehicle, a BMW X5, allegedly equipped with illegal blue lights, was not properly disclosed as a donation to Madadzhe by businessmen to the Independent Electoral Commission (IEC).

During an interview on Capricorn FM, Madadzhe refuted the accusations, clarifying that the vehicle had been purchased by the ANC in 2023 to facilitate the operations of the Office of the Provincial Secretary.

Madadzhe also dismissed additional rumors suggesting that his driver was a foreign national, stating that none of his support staff at the ANC office were non-citizens.
