= Maseko Pheedi =

South African politician

Maseko Pheedi MPL

Member of the Limpopo Provincial Legislature
- Incumbent
- Assumed office 14 June 2024

Personal details
- Born: 21 June 1962 (age 63)
- Party: African National Congress
- Profession: Politician

Maseko Solomon Pheedi (born 21 June 1962), also spelled Maseka Pheedi, is a South African politician from Limpopo. Formerly the mayor of Blouberg Local Municipality between 2016 and 2021, he has represented the African National Congress (ANC) in the Limpopo Provincial Legislature since June 2024.

== Early life and career ==
Pheedi was born on 21 June 1962 in the village of Ga-Mophoto, also known as Johannesburg Farm, and he grew up in nearby Makaepea. He attended Mabea High School in Burgerricht, where he was a member of the student representative council, and the University of Venda.

After a brief stint teaching at a high school, Pheedi was a lecturer at a teachers' training college from 1991 to 2001 and then a curriculum advisor from 2001 to 2011. He joined the African National Congress (ANC) in 1991, during the negotiations to end apartheid, and also became a local leader in the South African National Civics Organisation.

== Career in government ==
Between 2016 and 2021, Pheedi was the mayor of Blouberg Local Municipality, which encompasses his home village. After the November 2021 local elections, he moved to the Capricorn District Municipality, where he was elected as speaker.

In the May 2024 general election, he was elected to represent the ANC in the Limpopo Provincial Legislature, ranked eleventh on the provincial party list.

Pheedi was first elected to the Provincial Executive Committee of the ANC's Limpopo branch in June 2022, and he was elected to a second consecutive term in March 2026.
