= Constance Seoposengwe =

South African politician and anti-apartheid activist

Her Excellency Constance Seoposengwe

Member of the National Assembly of South Africa
- In office 5 July 2019 – 18 July 2022
- Preceded by: Sibongile Besani
- Succeeded by: Mookgo Matuba

Speaker of the Northern Cape Provincial Legislature
- In office 2004–2009
- Preceded by: Ethne Papenfus
- Succeeded by: Goolam Akharwaray

Northern Cape MEC for Safety and Liaison
- In office 2000–2004

Deputy Speaker of the Northern Cape Provincial Legislature
- In office 1999–2000

Personal details
- Party: African National Congress
- Profession: Politician

Constance Seoposengwe is a South African politician, anti-apartheid activist and diplomat. A member of the African National Congress, she is currently the South African High Commissioner to Lesotho. She had previously served as a member of the National Assembly of South Africa.

== Biography ==
Seoposengwe was a member of the United Democratic Front and an organiser for the South African Domestic Workers Union. She also worked as a teacher.

While pregnant at the age of 22 in 1987, Seoposengwe was tortured and held captive on the sixth floor of the Transvaal Police Station in Kimberley. After apartheid, she became a member of the Northern Cape Provincial Legislature in 1994, representing the African National Congress. In 1999 she was elected deputy speaker of the legislature. She was appointed as Member of the Executive Council (MEC) for Safety and Security in 2000. In the same year, she exposed how she was verbally abused by drunk white police officers at the Hartswater police station.

Seoposengwe was elected speaker of the legislature after the 2004 election, a position she held until 2009.

Seoposengwe has since campaigned for the changing of place names in Kimberley. She campaigned for the changing of the name of the Transvaal Police Station in 2011, and it has since been changed to the Kimberley Police Station. In 2013, she was interviewed for the SABC board.

Seoposengwe appeared on the ANC list of national parliamentary candidates in 2019. She was not elected to parliament at the election, however, she soon entered the National Assembly as a replacement for Sibongile Besani. Seoposengwe was a member of the Standing Committee on Auditor General and an alternate member of the Portfolio Committee on Human Settlements, Water and Sanitation.

On 18 July 2022, Seoposengwe resigned as a Member of Parliament. She had been appointed South African High Commissioner to Lesotho. She presented her credentials to King Letsie III on 18 August 2022.
