= Lesego Makhubela =

South African politician

Lesego Makhubela MPL

Member of the Gauteng Provincial Legislature
- Incumbent
- Assumed office 22 May 2019

Personal details
- Born: 1986 (age 39–40)
- Citizenship: South Africa
- Party: African National Congress
- Education: Illinois University

Lesego Ellis Makhubela (born 1986) is a South African politician who has represented the African National Congress (ANC) in the Gauteng Provincial Legislature since 2019. He formerly represented the ANC as a local councillor in the City of Tshwane Metropolitan Municipality, where he was also the Regional Chairperson of the ANC Youth League. In 2022, he was elected to a four-year term as a member of the Provincial Executive Committee of the ANC's Gauteng branch.

== Early life and education ==
Makhubela was born in 1986. He has a Bachelor of Science in computer science from Illinois University in the United States.

== ANC Youth League ==
Makhubela was active in the ANC Youth League (ANCYL) and chaired the league's local branch in Lotus Gardens in Tshwane. By 2015, he was the Regional Chairperson of the ANCYL's Tshwane branch, with Ezra Letsoalo as his deputy. In 2015, he was viewed by the Mail & Guardian as one of the top contenders to succeed Julius Malema as President of the national ANCYL. When the league's national elective conference was held in September 2015, there was a minor uproar when another frontrunner, Ronald Lamola, apparently failed to gain the requisite support to stand as a nominee. Makhubela was nominated afterwards but declined the nomination, saying that he would prefer a recount of Lamola's nominations; Collen Maine was therefore elected unopposed.

Makhubela remained in office as ANCYL Regional Chairperson and was re-elected to that position in October 2017. He also represented the ANC as a local councillor in the City of Tshwane Metropolitan Municipality and was the spokesman for the ANC's caucus in the council.

== Legislative career ==
In the 2019 general election, Makhubela was elected to a seat in the Gauteng Provincial Legislature, ranked 15th on the ANC's provincial party list. Two years later, in April 2021, he was appointed to the task team that was created to lead the ANCYL until it could hold fresh leadership elections to select Collen Maine's successor. However, later that year, the leaders of the task team reported Makhubela to the party's national leadership as one of several ANCYL task team members whom they alleged were over the age of 35, the cut-off for eligibility for membership in the ANCYL. In May 2021, Makhubela was expelled from the league on the grounds that he was indeed over the age of 35.

In July 2022, he was elected to the Provincial Executive Committee of the Gauteng branch of the mainstream ANC. After his election, he served as spokesperson for the Gauteng ANC, while remaining in his legislative seat.
