= Mookgo Matuba =

South African politician

Mookgo Matuba MP

Member of the National Assembly of South Africa
- In office 17 August 2022 – 28 May 2024
- Preceded by: Constance Seoposengwe

Personal details
- Party: African National Congress

Mookgo Maria Matuba is a South African politician for the African National Congress who served as a Member of the National Assembly of South Africa till 2024. She replaced Constance Seoposengwe who resigned to take up the position of South African High Commissioner to Lesotho.

During her term in parliament, she was a member of the Standing Committee on Auditor-General and the Portfolio Committee on Water and Sanitation.
