= Muzi Chirwa =

South African politician (born 1968)

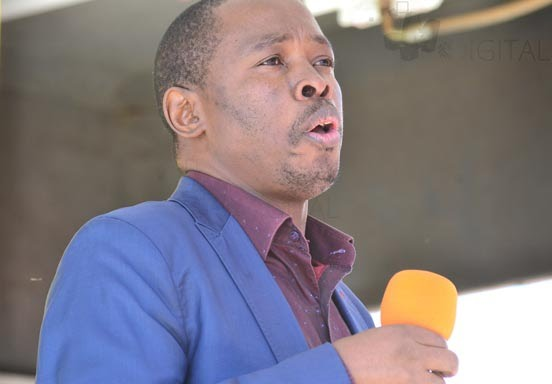
- Chirwa in 2017

Provincial Secretary of the African National Congress in Mpumalanga
- Incumbent
- Assumed office April 2022
- Deputy: Mpumi Hlophe
- Chairperson: Mandla Ndlovu
- Preceded by: Mandla Ndlovu

Mayor of the Gert Sibande District Municipality
- In office August 2016 – November 2021
- Preceded by: Meshack Nhlabathi
- Succeeded by: Walter Mngomezulu

Personal details
- Born: 11 July 1968 (age 58) Tjakastad, Mpumalanga, South Africa
- Party: African National Congress
- Spouse: Alice Chirwa

Muzi Gibson Chirwa (born 11 July 1968) is a South African politician serving as the Provincial Secretary of the African National Congress (ANC) in Mpumalanga since April 2022. He previously served as Mayor of the Gert Sibande District Municipality.
