= Senzo Mkhize =

South African politician (1970–2016)

Member of the KwaZulu-Natal Provincial Legislature
- In office May 2010 – May 2016

Member of the National Assembly
- In office 6 May 2009 – 19 May 2010
- Constituency: KwaZulu-Natal

Personal details
- Born: Langalakhe Nicholas Mkhize; 28 July 1970 Inanda, Natal; South Africa
- Died: May 2016 (aged 45) Durban, KwaZulu-Natal
- Resting place: Heroes' Acre, Chesterville; KwaZulu-Natal, South Africa
- Party: African National Congress

Langalakhe Nicholas "Senzo" Mkhize (28 July 1970 – May 2016) was a South African politician who represented the African National Congress (ANC) in the National Assembly from 2009 to 2010 and then in the KwaZulu-Natal Provincial Legislature from 2010 to 2016. He was the Chief Whip in the provincial legislature from 2014 until his death in 2016. Formerly an activist in the ANC Youth League, Mkhize was also a member of the Provincial Executive Committee of the ANC's KwaZulu-Natal branch.

== Early life and activism ==
He was born in Inanda in present-day KwaZulu-Natal (formerly Natal province) on 28 July 1970. He became active in the anti-apartheid movement while a student at Nkosinathi High School in the 1980s. According to Mxolisi Kaunda, he became active in the United Democratic Front in Inanda through the Inanda Youth Organisation, an affiliate of the South African Youth Congress.

After the ANC was unbanned in 1990, he became a regional leader of the ANC Youth League, and later of the mainstream ANC, in northern Durban. He ultimately served as Deputy Chairperson of the ANC Youth League's KwaZulu-Natal branch.

== Provincial legislature ==
In the 2009 general election, Mkhize was elected to an ANC seat in the National Assembly. He held the seat until 19 May 2010, when the ANC transferred him to a seat in the KwaZulu-Natal Provincial Legislature. In 2012, he was appointed as the party's Deputy Chief Whip in the provincial legislature. Pursuant to the 2014 general election, he was elected to his first full term in the provincial legislature, ranked 18th on the ANC's provincial party list, and was additionally named as the ANC's Chief Whip in the legislature.

He was also a member of the Provincial Executive Committee of the ANC's provincial branch in KwaZulu-Natal. Following his election to the body in 2012, he served as provincial spokesperson for the provincial party. He was re-elected to another four-year term on the committee in 2015.

== Personal life and death ==
Mkhize was married to Nelisiwe, with whom he had five children. After suffering a stroke in 2015, he died in May 2016 in hospital in Durban following a long illness. He was buried at Heroes' Acre in Chesterville.
