= Mahlodi Mahasela =

South African politician

Mahlodi Mahasela MPL

Member of the Limpopo Provincial Legislature
- Incumbent
- Assumed office 22 May 2019

Mayor of Musina
- In office March 2006 – May 2011
- Preceded by: David Phologa
- Succeeded by: Carol Phiri

Personal details
- Citizenship: South Africa
- Party: African National Congress

Mahlodi Caroline Mahasela is a South African politician who has represented the African National Congress (ANC) in the Limpopo Provincial Legislature since 2019. She was the first female Mayor of Musina Local Municipality from 2006 to 2011.

Mahasela became politically active in 1992 when she joined the South African Democratic Teachers Union, an affiliate of the ANC-aligned Congress of South African Trade Unions. She joined the ANC in 1997 and by 1999 was secretary of the ANC Women's League branch in Musina in Limpopo province. She was elected as an ANC councillor in Musina Local Municipality in the 2000 local government elections. During her tenure as a councillor, she remained active in the regional ranks of the ANC Women's League and was also elected to the branch executive committee of the mainstream ANC's branch in Musina.

She was re-elected as a councillor in the 2006 local government elections and in March 2006 was inaugurated as Mayor of Musina. During her tenure as mayor, the municipality received unqualified audits every year. After the 2011 local government elections, she was succeeded as mayor by Carol Phiri. In June 2018, she was elected to a four-year term on the Provincial Executive Committee of the ANC's Limpopo branch. The following year, she was elected to a seat in the Limpopo Provincial Legislature, ranked 30th on the ANC's provincial party list. She was re-elected to the ANC Provincial Executive Committee in June 2022.
