= Rebecca Phaladi-Digamela =

South African politician

Rebecca Phaladi-Digamela MPL

Member of the Gauteng Provincial Legislature
- Incumbent
- Assumed office 22 May 2019

Personal details
- Born: 4 September 1962 (age 64) Mamaolo, Ga-Mphahlele; Transvaal Province, South Africa
- Party: African National Congress
- Education: University of Pretoria (PhD)

Mauwane Rebecca Phaladi-Digamela (born 4 September 1962) is a South African politician, nurse, and academic who currently represents the African National Congress (ANC) in the Gauteng Provincial Legislature. Formerly a ward councillor in Gauteng, she was elected to the provincial legislature for the first time in the 2019 general election. In June 2019, she was elected Chairperson of Gauteng's Portfolio Committee on Health, a position which she held throughout the COVID-19 pandemic.

== Life and career ==
Phaladi-Digamela was born on 4 September 1962 in Mamaolo village in Ga-Mphahlele, a region that later became part of Lepelle-Nkumpi Local Municipality in Limpopo province. She earned diplomas in midwifery and nursing respectively from Mpumalanga's Themba Hospital and Limpopo's Groothoek Hospital, and she completed a PhD in nursing at the University of Pretoria. She is a published academic in the field of nursing, particularly through Sefako Makgatho University in Pretoria North, Gauteng.

Her political career began in 2000 when she joined her local ANC branch in Tshwane, Gauteng. She ultimately served as chairperson of the branch from 2004 to 2006 and secretary of the branch from 2007 to 2009. She rose through the regional and provincial ranks of the ANC and in July 2018 was elected for the first time to a seat on the Provincial Executive Committee of the Gauteng ANC; by number of votes received, she was ranked ninth of the 30 elected members. The following year, she was elected to the Gauteng Provincial Legislature, ranked 17th on the ANC's provincial party list. In July 2022, she was re-elected to a second four-year term on the ANC Provincial Executive Committee, ranked 29th by number of votes received.

== Personal life ==
Phaladi-Digamela has two children, one son and one daughter.
