= Thabo Mokone =

South African politician and businessman (born 1968)

Thabo Mokone MPL

Member of the Limpopo Executive Council for Agriculture and Rural Development
- In office 6 October 2022 – 14 June 2024
- Premier: Stanley Mathabatha
- Preceded by: Nandi Ndalane
- Succeeded by: Nakedi Sibanda-Kekana

Member of the Limpopo Executive Council for Economic Development, Environment and Tourism
- In office 22 May 2019 – 6 October 2022
- Premier: Stanley Mathabatha
- Preceded by: Seaparo Charles Sekoati
- Succeeded by: Rodgers Monama

Member of the Limpopo Provincial Legislature
- Incumbent
- Assumed office 22 May 2019

Personal details
- Born: Thabo Andrew Mokone; 26 May 1968 (age 58)
- Party: African National Congress
- Profession: Politician

Thabo Andrew Mokone (born 16 May 1968) is a South African politician and businessman. As a member of the African National Congress, he was elected to the Limpopo Provincial Legislature in 2019. He was appointed Member of the Executive Council (MEC) for Economic Development, Environment and Tourism shortly after his election. In October 2022, Mokone became MEC for Agriculture and Rural Development.

== Background ==
Mokone has a Bachelor of Arts (BA) in Education and a post-graduate qualification in Project Management. He holds a qualification in construction from the Construction Education and Training Authority (CETA). He has also served on the boards of the Road Agency Limpopo, the Huric Non-Governmental Organization and the Limpopo Economic Development Agency.

== ANC Provincial Executive Committee Member ==
Mokone is a member of the African National Congress. He serves on the party's Provincial Executive Committee in Limpopo. Following his re-election as a member of the PEC at the ANC's provincial elective conference in June 2018, the PEC elected him to serve on the Provincial Working Committee (PWC), the party's highest decision-making body in the province. Mokone was then named convenor of the party's sub-committee on Legislature and Governance. In August 2018, Mokone was appointed by the ANC to serve on a team to investigate ways to avoid the liquidation of VBS Bank, including the possibility of incorporating the bank into the Limpopo Economic Development Agency (LEDA). The bank was ultimately liquidated.

== Provincial government ==
Mokone was elected to the Limpopo Provincial Legislature in the 2019 general election on the ANC's list. The ANC had retained control of the province and ANC provincial chairman Stanley Mathabatha was re-elected as premier during the first sitting of the legislature on 22 May 2019. Mathabatha announced his new executive council which saw Mokone appointed MEC for Economic Development, Environment and Tourism.

In July 2020, Daily Maverick reported that Mokone had allegedly reconstituted the board of Limpopo Economic Development Agency (Leda) to appoint members who supported a contested R3.2-billion provincial mining deal which saw Mathabatha's foster brother emerge as a beneficiary.

At the ANC's 10th provincial elective conference, held at The Ranch Resort outside Polokwane in June 2022, Mokone was re-elected to the provincial elective committee as an additional member after having received the third highest number of votes from delegates. In October 2022, Mathabatha announced the second reshuffle of his executive council in less than three months which saw Mokone move to the Agriculture and Rural Development portfolio, taking over from Nandi Ndalane.

Following his re-election to the Provincial Legislature in the 2024 general election, Nakedi Sibanda-Kekana was appointed to replace him as the MEC for Agriculture and Rural Development.
