= Rodgers Monama =

South African politician (born 1966)

Rodgers Monama MPL

Member of the Limpopo Executive Council for Economic Development, Environment and Tourism
- In office 8 October 2022 – 14 June 2024
- Premier: Stanley Mathabatha
- Preceded by: Thabo Mokone
- Succeeded by: Tshitereke Matibe

Member of the Limpopo Provincial Legislature
- Incumbent
- Assumed office 22 May 2019

Personal details
- Born: Gannye Rodgers Monama; 2 January 1966 (age 60) Phokoane, Limpopo
- Party: African National Congress

Gannye Rodgers Monama (born 2 January 1966) is a South African politician and a member of the African National Congress. Monama was elected to the Limpopo Provincial Legislature in the 2019 general election. In October 2022, he was appointed the Member of the Executive Council (MEC) for Economic Development, Environment and Tourism in the Limpopo provincial government. Monama was re-elected to the Provincial Legislature but was not reappointed to the executive council in 2024.

== Career ==
Monama served as an ANC councillor of the Makhuduthamaga Local Municipality and the Sekhukhune District Municipality in the early 2000s. He is currently a member of the ANC Provincial Executive Committee.

In October 2017, Monama, while serving as the deputy director-general of corporate services in the Limpopo provincial government, along with the deputy director-general of corporate services, Gregory Makoko, came under scrutiny for buying land in the Greater Tubatse Local Municipality at an inflated price.

== Limpopo Provincial Government ==
Monama was elected to the Limpopo Provincial Legislature in the 2019 general election, having been ranked 21st on the ANC's list. In January 2022, Monama was appointed chairperson of the Standing Committee on Public Accounts in the legislature.

Monamama was re-elected as a member of the ANC Provincial Executive Committee at the party's 10th provincial elective conference held in June 2022. On 6 October 2022, re-elected ANC provincial chairperson and premier Stanley Mathabatha reshuffled his executive council less than three months after he initially reshuffled it following the provincial conference and appointed Monama as the Member of the Executive Council (MEC) for Economic Development, Environment and Tourism.

Monama was re-elected to the Provincial Legislature in the 2024 general election. The newly elected premier Phophi Ramathuba did not include him in her executive council.
