= Makhosi Zungu =

South African politician

Makhosi Zungu MPL

Member of the KwaZulu-Natal Provincial Legislature
- Incumbent
- Assumed office 22 May 2019

Personal details
- Born: 1971 or 1972 (age 54–55) Sundumbili, Mandeni; Natal, South Africa
- Party: African National Congress

Makhosazane Promise Patience Zungu (born 1971 or 1972) is a South African politician who has represented the African National Congress (ANC) in the KwaZulu-Natal Provincial Legislature since 2019. She was formerly the Speaker of Mandeni Local Municipality in KwaZulu-Natal and rose to prominence through the National Union of Metalworkers.

== Life and career ==
She was born in 1971 or 1972 in Sundumbili, a township in Mandeni in present-day KwaZulu-Natal, then Natal province. While attending Tshana High School, she joined the Congress of South African Students, and she later joined the ANC in Mandeni. At the same time she was a shop steward for the National Union of Metalworkers at her workplace in Isithebe and from 2002 to 2004 served on the leadership of her local branch of the ANC-allied Congress of South African Trade Unions. She was also active in the ANC Youth League. In the 2006 local elections, she was elected to represent the ANC as a local councillor in KwaZulu-Natal.

Until her election to the provincial legislature, she was Speaker of Mandeni Local Municipality. She was elected to the provincial legislature in the 2019 general election, ranked 21st on the ANC's provincial party list. In July 2022, she was elected to a four-year term on the Provincial Executive Committee of the ANC's KwaZulu-Natal branch; she was previously elected in 2015 and 2018.

== Personal life ==
She is a member of the Twelve Apostles Church and has one child.
