= Gertrude Mothupi =

South African politician (born 1970)

Member of the Free State Provincial Legislature
- In office May 2009 – May 2014
- In office April 2004 – March 2006

Mayor of Mangaung
- In office March 2006 – August 2008

Personal details
- Born: Dibeela Gertrude Pheko; 1 October 1970 (age 55)
- Citizenship: South Africa
- Party: African National Congress
- Other party: Congress of the People (2008–2014)
- Relations: Charlotte Lobe (sister)

Dibeela Gertrude Mothupi (née Pheko; born 1 October 1970) is a South African politician who has been a part-time member of the Commission for Gender Equality since 2019. She was Mayor of Mangaung from 2006 to 2008 and served in the Free State Provincial Legislature.

Formerly a youth activist and local councillor in Botshabelo, Mothupi entered legislative politics during her term as Deputy Speaker of the Free State Provincial Legislature from 2004 to 2006. She left the provincial legislature in March 2006 to represent her party, the African National Congress (ANC), as Mangaung Mayor. She left the mayoral office in August 2008, when she was expelled from the ANC following a disciplinary inquiry. She subsequently joined the opposition Congress of the People (Cope), which she represented in the Free State Provincial Legislature from 2009 to 2014. She has since rejoined the ANC.

== Early life ==
Born on 1 October 1970, Mothupi is the elder sister of politician Charlotte Lobe. In Charlotte's account, they joined the anti-apartheid movement in the former Orange Free State as a form of rebellion against their father, a policeman who had left their mother. The sisters joined the Botshabelo Students Congress and the Botshabelo Youth Congress in 1987.

== Career in government ==
After the end of apartheid in 1994, Mothupi represented the ANC as a proportional-representation councillor in Botshabelo, and was also active in structures of the South African Local Government Association.

=== Deputy Speaker: 2004–2006 ===
In the 2004 general election, Mothupi was elected to an ANC seat in the Free State Provincial Legislature. She was also appointed as Deputy Speaker of the legislature, deputising Mxolisi Dukwana. During the same period, she served as provincial secretary of the ANC Women's League in the Free State.

=== Mayor of Mangaung: 2006–2008 ===
Mothupi left the legislature after the local government elections in March 2006, in which she was elected as Mayor of Mangaung Metropolitan Municipality. She held the mayoral office for less than three years: in July 2008, she and the council's speaker, Mahlomola Ralebese, were instructed by the Free State ANC to resign from their positions. ANC provincial chairperson Ace Magashule explained that the ANC caucus in the council lacked "common purpose" under Mothupi's leadership, but the media linked the move to Mothupi's poor relationship with municipal manager Thabo Manyoni, who had recently been elected as Magashule's deputy in the party.

When Mothupi and Ralebase refused to resign from their positions in the council, they were subject to an internal disciplinary hearing, which concluded in August with their conviction and expulsion from the ANC.

=== Return to the legislature: 2009–2014 ===
After being expelled from the ANC, Mothupi followed her sister in joining Cope, a new breakaway party. In the next general election in 2009, she returned to the Free State Provincial Legislature under the Cope banner. In April 2014, a month before the 2014 general election, Mothupi and a fellow defector, Casca Mokitlane, announced their return to the ANC. Mothupi said that Cope had not delivered on its founding principles and had been damaged by factional infighting. At an ANC press conference, she told the media:

I still feel that it wasn’t a wrong decision to join Cope because of what the party stood for. Though I must say, you can't be in a party where you don’t know what is happening, and about the programmes and activities, so I felt I should leave the Congress of the People and what a better way than going back to a party that I knew.

== Public service ==
On 1 August 2019, President Cyril Ramaphosa appointed Mothupi to a five-year term as a part-time commissioner at the Commission for Gender Equality.
