= Molefi Sefularo =

South African politician (1957–2010)

Molefi Sefularo (9 July 1957 – 5 April 2010) was the Deputy Minister of Health of South Africa from 25 September 2008 until his death. The position of Deputy Minister of Health had been vacant since Nozizwe Madlala-Routledge was dismissed from the post on 8 August 2007. He previously served as the MEC for Health in North West Province from 1994 to 2004.

Sefularo was born in Potchefstroom to Kenosi Solomon Sefularo and Masabata Martha Sefularo née Motsumi. He was a member of the UDF until its 1983 banning. He died at the age of 52 in a car accident on the N4 west of Pretoria.

== Personal life ==
Sefularo was married to Kgomotso Kgoathe from 19 October 1989 until his death. He had three daughters and one son, Chere.

== See also ==
- List of members of the National Assembly of South Africa who died in office
