= Maurencia Gillion =

South African politician (died 2023)

Member of the National Council of Provinces from the Western Cape
- In office 23 May 2019 – 28 February 2023

Member of the Western Cape Provincial Parliament
- In office 21 May 2014 – 7 May 2019

Personal details
- Born: Maurencia Natalie Gillion
- Died: 28 February 2023 Cape Town, South Africa
- Party: African National Congress

Maurencia Natalie Gillion (died 28 February 2023) was a South African politician who served as a permanent delegate to the National Council of Provinces, the upper house of the South African Parliament. She was a member of the Western Cape provincial delegation, representing the African National Congress (ANC). She was also the chairperson of the legislature's Select Committee on Health and Social Services. Gillion served as a Member of the Western Cape Provincial Parliament from 2014 to 2019.

== Political career ==
She was the Executive Mayor of the Overberg District Municipality between 2006 and 2010. Gillion then served as a Member of the Western Cape Provincial Parliament from 2014 to 2019.

Within the ANC, she served as the party's deputy provincial secretary from 2011 to 2015 and as the party's provincial treasurer from 2015 to 2019.

== Parliamentary career ==
On 23 May 2019, Gillion was sworn in as a permanent delegate to the National Council of Provinces. She was one of six permanent delegates from the Western Cape. On 24 June, she received her committee assignments. Gillion was elected chairperson of the Select Committee on Health and Social Services on 26 June.

=== Committee assignments ===
- Select Committee on Health and Social Services (Chairperson)
- Select Committee on Education and Technology, Sports, Arts and Culture

== Death ==
Gillion collapsed and lost consciousness during the afternoon session of a three-day training workshop for Members of Parliament at a Cape Town Hotel on 28 February 2023. She died following unsuccessful attempts to resuscitate her.
