= Refiloe Kekana =

South African politician

Refiloe Kekana MPL

Member of the Gauteng Provincial Legislature
- Incumbent
- Assumed office 22 May 2019

Personal details
- Born: 21 January 1967 (age 59) Lady Selborne, Pretoria; Transvaal, South Africa
- Party: African National Congress
- Education: University of Pretoria

Refiloe Johannah Kekana (born 21 January 1967) is a South African politician who has represented the African National Congress (ANC) in the Gauteng Provincial Legislature since 2019. A radiographer by training, she was formerly a councilor in the City of Tshwane Metropolitan Municipality from 2011 to 2019.

== Early life and education ==
Kekana was born on 21 January 1967 in Lady Selborne in Pretoria. She matriculated at Hofmeyr High School in Atteridgeville in 1983 and trained as a radiographer. From 1984, she worked as a student radiographer at Baragwanath Hospital in Johannesburg, where she became active in the trade union movement as an organiser for the National Education, Health and Allied Workers' Union. She joined the ANC after it was unbanned by the apartheid government in 1990.

In addition to her radiography diplomas, she holds a Bachelor's degree in public administration from the University of Pretoria and has been a registered real estate agent since 1998.

== Political career ==
Kekana rose to political prominence through her local ANC branch in Pretoria East. From 2008, she served two terms as the branch's secretary and coordinated its campaign in the 2009, 2011, 2014, and 2016 elections. At the same time, from 2011 onwards, she represented the ANC as a proportional-representation councilor in the City of Tshwane Metropolitan Municipality. While she was in that office, she completed her second term as ANC branch secretary and was elected deputy chairperson of the party branch.

In July 2018, she was elected to a four-year term on the Provincial Executive Committee of the ANC's provincial branch in Gauteng. In the general election the following year, she was elected to the Gauteng Provincial Legislature, ranked 13th on the ANC's provincial party list. She was not re-elected to the party's Provincial Executive Committee in 2022.

== Personal life ==
Kekana has one son and one daughter.
