= ISithebe =

iSithebe
- Location within KwaZulu-Natal Location within South Africa
- Coordinates: 29.089°S 31.432°E
- Country: South Africa
- Province: KwaZulu-Natal
- District: Ilembe
- Municipality: Mandeni
- Established: 1980s

Area
  - Total: 6.25 km^{2} (2.41 sq mi)

Population (2001)
  - Total: 9,564
  - Density: 1,530/km^{2} (3,960/sq mi)
- Time zone: UTC+2 (SAST)

iSithebe is a town in Ilembe District Municipality in the KwaZulu-Natal province of South Africa. The small town some 2 hours driving time north of Durban was established as a manufacturing industrial park in the early eighties. Prince Mangosuthu Buthelezi can be credited as one of the drivers behind the establishment of this industrial park - this was at a time when parts of the KwaZulu Natal province of were governed by a separate, tribal regime owing to apartheid policies applicable at that time in the history of South Africa. In the eighties, Mr Buthelezi, had successfully attracted small and medium businesses to the industrial park, with extensive investments from Taiwan. The area, which also has paper mill, was known for low wages, but at its prime, many factories were functional and scores of people from the area were earning some income. Today November 2018, Isithebe industrial park is a ghost town. Many of the prime industrial sites are silent with rusted structures and gates. The population on the outskirts of the zone has multiplied over the decades. It is a very sad sight. There is speculation, as elsewhere in the globe, that with the dawn of democracy in South Africa in the early 1990s, imports flooded the markets or bluntly put, the Chinese came and squeezed out the Taiwanese, both in business and politically. A drive through iSithebe industrial park is a very sad reminder of what the beloved country of South Africa has become. The park, managed by Ithala Bank, has good infrastructure in terms of water, road, electricity, and desperate (cheap) labour. Links to the main roads and airport are good. ISithebe still presents a great opportunity to an entrepreneur or investor.
