= Bones Modise =

South African politician

Bones Modise MPL

Member of the Gauteng Provincial Legislature
- Incumbent
- Assumed office 22 May 2019

Personal details
- Born: Siphosami Bonisile Sigasa; 1980 (age 45–46)
- Citizenship: South Africa
- Party: African National Congress
- Other political affiliations: South African Communist Party
- Education: University of South Africa

Mpho Gift "Bones" Modise (born January 1980), né Siphosami Bonisile Sigasa, is a South African politician. He is a member of the African National Congress (ANC) serving in the Gauteng Provincial Legislature since 2019. A former ANC Youth League activist and civil servant, he was elected to his first term in the 2019 general election.

== Early life ==
Modise was born on 1 January 1980 in Zola, Soweto, named Siphosami Bonisile Sigasa. He is the son of Napoleon Mzuleki Sigasa and Limakatso Emily Maine. His name changed in his childhood after he left Soweto to live with his mother who married Mohau Isaac Modise. He was raised in Zola and in Sharpeville Vaal.

During his high school years, he was expelled from multiple schools. He the matriculated at Isizwe Sechaba Secondary School where he was elected President of School Representative Council. As a student, he was active in the Congress of South African Students {COSAS} School Drama and Debating team, and later became active in the ANC and South African Communist Party {SACP}.

He became the youngest chairperson of his local ANC branch in Vereeniging and also served as both Regional and Provincial Secretary of the ANC Youth League in the Vaal and Gauteng Province.

== Career ==
While he lived in Sharpeville he spent time with comrades Molahlehi David Congo Majake, Banzo Phohlela, Sefatsa Sefatsa, Kenny Ndongeni, Michael Rapasa, and Jikitjela.

He joined the ANC PEC in 2013.

He worked in public administration at the Gauteng Youth Commission, the Office of the Gauteng Premier, the Gauteng Department of Infrastructure Development, and Emfuleni Local Municipality.

Modise was elected for his first term in the legislature in the 2019 general election. He ranked 33rd on the ANC's provincial party list. After the election he was elected to chair the legislature's Portfolio Committee on Infrastructure Development. He also sits in two Portfolio Committees; namely Sports, Arts, Culture and Recreation and the other Standing Committee on Public Accounts. He is also a former member of Social Development. and Oversight Committee on Premier's Office and Legislature.

He is serving his second term. After the 29 May 2024 election, he was deployed to the National Council of Provinces, the upper house of Parliament of the Republic of South Africa. In the NCOP he was elected to chair the Select Committee on Land and Mineral Resources. In this committee, he oversees: Mineral and Petroleum Resources; Fisheries, Foresty and Environment; Land Reform and Rural Development; Energy and Electricity; and Agriculture. He also sits in the Select Committee on Economic Development overseeing: Tourism; Employment and Labour; Communications and Digital Technologies; Trade, Industries and Competition; and Small Business Development.

He was appointed to be the ANCYL Provincial Task Team Coordinator and was subsequently elected as the ANCYL Provincial Secretary.

He is the former ANC Spokesperson in Gauteng. Modise served as the ANC Gauteng Legislature Caucus Spokesperson.

He is studying for Master of Public Management at Regenesys Business School and has a Post Graduate Diploma from University of Johannesburg.

== Personal life ==
He is married to Boitumelo and has two daughters and a son. He is trained in both community and formal classical theatre. Brought up in Soweto and Vaal, he is conversant in IsiZulu, Sesotho, and some Setswana, Sepedi, IsiXhosa and English, as well as township lingo.
