= Cassel Mathale =

South African politician (born 1961)

The Honourable Cassel Mathale MP

Deputy Minister of Police
- Incumbent
- Assumed office 29 May 2019
- President: Cyril Ramaphosa
- Minister: Firoz Cachalia
- Preceded by: Bongani Mkongi

Deputy Minister of Small Business Development
- In office 26 February 2018 – 7 May 2019
- President: Cyril Ramaphosa
- Minister: Lindiwe Zulu
- Preceded by: Nomathemba November
- Succeeded by: Rosemary Capa

3rd Premier of Limpopo
- In office 3 March 2009 – 15 July 2013
- President: Jacob Zuma
- Preceded by: Sello Moloto
- Succeeded by: Stanley Mathabatha

Provincial Chairperson of the African National Congress in Limpopo
- In office 17 July 2008 – March 2013
- Deputy: Dickson Masemola
- Preceded by: Sello Moloto
- Succeeded by: Stanley Mathabatha

Personal details
- Born: Cassel Charlie Mathale; 23 January 1961 (age 65) Tzaneen, Transvaal; Union of South Africa
- Party: African National Congress
- Education: University of the Western Cape

Cassel Mathale (born 23 January 1961) is a South African politician who was the third Premier of Limpopo between March 2009 and July 2013. He is currently the Deputy Minister of Police in the South African government and before that was Deputy Minister of Small Business Development from February 2018 to May 2019.

Formerly an anti-apartheid activist in the United Democratic Front, Mathale began his political career in the Limpopo provincial legislature and in the Limpopo branch of the African National Congress (ANC). He served as Provincial Secretary of the ANC in Limpopo from 2002 to 2008, when he was elected the party's Provincial Chairperson. Additionally, from December 2008 he was a Member of the Executive Council for Roads and Transport in the Limpopo provincial government under Premier Sello Moloto. When Moloto resigned in March 2009, Mathale became acting Premier and then was formally elected as Premier by the provincial legislature.

Though re-elected as ANC Provincial Chairperson in December 2011, Mathale lost the position when the ANC National Executive Committee disbanded the ANC Provincial Executive Committee in March 2013, amid a scandal which appeared to implicate Mathale and his close ally Julius Malema in improper conduct. Several months later, the national ANC withdrew its support for Mathale's premiership and asked him to resign. He did so on 15 July 2013. After his resignation from the Limpopo government in July 2013, Mathale was sworn in as a Member of the National Assembly. Several years into Mathale's tenure in Parliament, President Cyril Ramaphosa appointed him Deputy Minister of Small Business Development in February 2018 and then Deputy Minister of Police in May 2019.

== Early life and activism ==
Cassel Charlie Mathale was born on 23 January 1961 in Tzaneen outside Polokwane in what was then the Northern Transvaal, now Limpopo province. He matriculated at Phangasasa High School in Tzaneen and earned a Bachelor's degree in social sciences from the University of the Western Cape in Cape Town.

In the 1980s and early 1990s, Mathale was politically active in anti-apartheid organisations in the Northern Transvaal, including local and regional branches of the Azanian Students Organisation, the Muhlava Youth Congress and Northern Transvaal Youth Congress, the Tzaneen Education Crisis Committee, and, once it had been established, the South African Students Congress. He was a member of the regional executive committee of the United Democratic Front (UDF) in Northern Transvaal from 1986 to 1990 and was president of the South African Youth Congress in Northern Transvaal in 1990. He was detained between 1986 and 1989 under the Terrorism Act.

Additionally, in 1990, Mathale was appointed as a member of its interim leadership core of the Northern Transvaal branch of the African National Congress (ANC), which had recently been unbanned by the apartheid government and was re-establishing its structures inside South Africa. Subsequently he sat on the regional executive committee of the ANC in Northern Transvaal from 1990 to 1991 and again from 1993 to 1996.

== Post-apartheid career ==
In South Africa's first democratic elections in 1994, Mathale was elected as a Member of the Limpopo Provincial Legislature and also became Commissioner for Youth Affairs in the provincial government. He served on the Provincial Executive Committee of the Limpopo ANC between 1994 and 1997. He left the provincial legislature and government in 1996, and the ANC provincial executive in 1997, but in 1996 was elected to a two-year term as a member of the ANC Youth League's National Executive Committee. In subsequent years he held a variety of positions in ANC structures in Limpopo: he was regional secretary for the ANC's North East Limpopo region from 1998 to 2000, a member of the regional executive committee of the ANC's Mopani region in 2000, and a member of the branch executive committee at a local ANC branch in Nkowankowa from 2001 to 2002.

=== ANC Provincial Secretary: 2002–2008 ===
In 2002, Mathale was elected Provincial Secretary of the ANC in Limpopo, one of the most senior leadership positions in the provincial party. Although it was a full-time position based at ANC headquarters, the Mail & Guardian observed that Mathale was simultaneously a "well-known entrepreneur" in Limpopo, with directorships in at least ten companies in the mining, construction, farming, and hospitality sectors.

At the same time, towards the end of his second term as Provincial Secretary, Mathale launched a bid to replace Sello Moloto as Provincial Chairperson of the ANC in Limpopo. He was supported by the Limpopo branch of the ANC Youth League, which at that time was led by league provincial secretary Julius Malema. The league had turned against Moloto when Moloto supported incumbent ANC President Thabo Mbeki in his succession battle with ANC Deputy President Jacob Zuma, who ultimately ousted Mbeki at the ANC's 52nd National Conference. In early 2008, Mathale and Moloto's rivalry became highly divisive in the Limpopo ANC; their respective supporters clashed violently on several occasions.

=== ANC Provincial Chairperson: 2008–2013 ===
The Limpopo ANC held its elective conference in July 2008 at the University of Venda and, on 17 July, it elected Mathale as Provincial Chairperson of the ANC in Limpopo. Mathale beat Moloto by more than 200 votes. Two weeks later, the Mathale-led Provincial Executive Committee declined a request from the national ANC to nominate three people to stand as the ANC's candidate for Premier of Limpopo in the 2009 general election; instead, the committee submitted only one name, Mathale's. The provincial party also put Moloto, the incumbent Premier, under significant pressure, exhorting him to reshuffle the provincial executive and appoint Mathale to a senior government position.

Finally, in December 2008, Moloto appointed Mathale as Member of the Executive Council (MEC) for Roads and Transport, after the incumbent, Justice Piitso, resigned. In addition, both as provincial secretary and as provincial chairperson, Mathale was an ex officio member of the ANC National Executive Committee.

== Premier of Limpopo ==
In March 2009, Moloto resigned as Premier and defected from the ANC to the Congress of the People, a new pro-Mbeki breakaway party. The Limpopo Executive Council appointed Mathale as acting Premier of Limpopo from 3 to 23 March 2009 while the provincial legislature prepared to select Moloto's successor. Although there was some speculation that Maite Nkoana-Mashabane might be appointed Premier instead of Mathale, he was formally sworn in to the office on 24 March. Pursuant to the general election in May that year, he was elected to a full term as Premier.

He was also re-elected as ANC Provincial Chairperson in December 2011, despite growing opposition to his leadership of the province. Discontent rested partly with the Limpopo provincial branches of the ANC's partners in the Tripartite Alliance, the Congress of South African Trade Unions (Cosatu) and the South African Communist Party (SACP), which had publicly called for Mathale's resignation, accusing him of presiding over a corrupt administration. At the same time, on some accounts, opposition to Mathale was linked to broader leadership struggles in the national ANC: Mathale remained an ally of Julius Malema, and together the pair were viewed as having turned against Zuma and as agitating for the ANC to depose Zuma at the ANC's 53rd National Conference, scheduled for December 2012. Yet when the Limpopo ANC held its elective conference, Mathale beat his challenger, Joe Phaahla, with 601 votes against Phaahla's 519.

However, Mathale did not complete his full term either as Premier or as ANC Provincial Chairperson. In the weeks before the conference which re-elected Mathale, several newspapers had reported that Mathale's administration faced severe financial shortfalls and that Mathale had requested a R700-million bailout from the National Treasury after commercial banks withdrew their credit lines. In early December 2011, five provincial departments in Mathale's administration, including the provincial treasury under MEC David Masondo, had been placed under administration by the national government. Mathale's supporters later claimed that this move rendered Mathale "a lame duck premier" in subsequent months.

In January 2012, after Mathale's re-election as ANC chair, the full scale of the province's administrative and financial problems emerged. Both the Auditor-General and the national Ministry of Finance reported publicly about the R2-billion budget shortfall faced by the Limpopo government, which they said was caused by a lack of spending restraint, including significant expenditure on contracts marred by procurement irregularities; both appeared to blame the crisis on the province's political leadership. In February, a spokesman for the Hawks said that Mathale, his wife, and Julius Malema were under investigation on allegations of corruption and business irregularities. Other state agencies undertook their own investigations into procurement irregularities. Later in 2012, Mathale's business partner, Selby Manthatha, was charged with corruption, fraud, and money laundering; the National Prosecuting Authority alleged that Manthatha and other members of his family had bribed Malema to obtain government tenders.

== Succession as Premier ==
In December 2012, the ANC's 53rd National Conference re-elected Jacob Zuma as ANC president. At the conference, Mathale stood unsuccessfully for direct election to the ANC's National Executive Committee. Several months later, allegations of corruption and maladministration in Limpopo continued to receive a great deal of national attention; some members of the ANC in Limpopo also complained that Mathale had sown division in the party. Others, however, suggested that opposition to Mathale was primarily a form of retribution for his opposition to Zuma's re-election.

On 18 March 2013, the ANC National Executive Committee announced that it had dissolved the entire Provincial Executive Committee of the Limpopo ANC, prematurely ending Mathale's term as Provincial Chairperson. Fresh leadership elections would be organised by an interim leadership corps appointed by the national party leadership. ANC Secretary General Gwede Mantashe said that the Mathale-led committee had been dissolved "for displaying totally un-ANC behaviour and institutionalised factional conflict".

In July 2013, the national leadership of the ANC asked Mathale to resign as Premier, "recalling" him from the post in line with the party's cadre deployment policy. In a statement on 15 July, Mathale announced that he had complied with this request and had submitted his resignation letter. In the statement, he insisted that he and his administration had, "contrary to the wrong perception", strongly opposed "all forms of corruption within our jurisdiction". His resignation as Premier was effective from 15 July 2013. The National Education, Health and Allied Workers' Union, a Cosatu affiliate, praised the national ANC for its decision, saying, "Without being triumphalists, our union is happy to see that the ANC has at long last endorsed our view that Mr Mathale was a liability and an embarrassment to our movement and government".

== National government ==
The same day that his resignation as Premier took effect, Mathale was sworn in as a Member of the National Assembly, the lower house of the national Parliament. The Limpopo branch of Cosatu opposed his appointment. Nonetheless, he was elected to a full five-year term in the National Assembly in the 2014 general election and on 25 October 2017 he was appointed chairperson of the Portfolio Committee on Public Service and Administration.

On 26 February 2018, Mathale gave up his committee chairmanship to take office as the Deputy Minister of Small Business Development under Minister Lindiwe Zulu. He was installed in that position in a cabinet reshuffle by President Cyril Ramaphosa, who had recently ascended to the presidency following the resignation of President Jacob Zuma. In the 2019 general election, Mathale was re-elected to the National Assembly and Ramaphosa appointed him Deputy Minister of Police under Minister Bheki Cele.

== Personal life ==
Mathale is married and has children.

== See also ==
- History of the African National Congress
- Politics in South Africa
