= Sizophila Mkhize =

South African politician

Sizophila Mkhize MPL

Member of the KwaZulu-Natal Legislature
- Incumbent
- Assumed office 14 June 2024

Personal details
- Born: 26 December 1992 (age 33)
- Party: African National Congress
- Profession: Politician

Sizophila Magnficent Mkhize (born 26 December 1992) is a South African politician from KwaZulu-Natal. Formerly a youth activist, she has represented the African National Congress (ANC) in the KwaZulu-Natal Legislature since 2024.

== Early life and activism ==
Mkhize was born on 26 December 1992 in Nkandla, KwaZulu-Natal, where she grew up.

She rose to political prominence in the ANC Youth League (ANCYL) in KwaZulu-Natal. According to Mkhize, she was recruited into the ANCYL and Congress of South African Students in 2006, aged 14.

== Political career ==
At the ANCYL's national conference in Midrand in September 2015, Mkhize was elected as an ordinary member of the league's National Executive Committee, though the leadership corps was disbanded by the party's national leadership in 2019. The so-called National Youth Task Team was appointed to lead the ANCYL into the next elective conference instead, and in October 2019, Mkhize was co-opted as a member of the task team. In that capacity, she caused a minor stir in 2021 by complaining on Facebook that ANC staffers had barred her from an ANC National Executive Committee lekgottla because her dress was "too short"; national ANC politicians came to her defense, with Malusi Gigaba posting on Instagram that the incident was "very humiliating to her and to all of us that abhor gender-based violence."

In July 2022, Mkhize was also elected as an ordinary member of the mainstream ANC's Provincial Executive Committee in KwaZulu-Natal. By that time, she was considered a likely candidate to stand for election as national president of the ANCYL at its next national conference. In the first half of 2023 she openly campaigned for the position. However, in June 2023, she withdrew abruptly from the race, saying that she did not intend to seek any further provincial or national offices in the ANCYL.

In the May 2024 general election, Mkhize was elected to represent the ANC in the KwaZulu-Natal Legislature, ranked fifth on the provincial party list. She was also elected as chairperson of the legislature's Portfolio Committee on Sports, Arts, and Culture. She was the youngest member of, and the only ANCYL representative in, the ANC's caucus in the legislature.

== Political views ==
During the civil unrest of July 2021 in KwaZulu-Natal, Mkhize made an inflammatory speech to supporters in Phoenix, where there had recently been an outbreak of violence between local residents of black and Indian backgrounds. Speaking in Zulu, Mkhize lambasted Indian South Africans as murderers and claimed that "the economy of KZN and that of eThekwini are in the control of people of Indian ancestry". The national ANC leadership said that Mkhize would face internal disciplinary charges for her remarks, which national spokesperson Pule Mabe described as "derogatory and racist". In later months, Mkhize continued to call for an "audit" in eThekwini to determine the proportion of municipal contracts awarded to Indian-owned businesses.

Mkhize has said that she opposed Cyril Ramaphosa's re-election as national ANC president in December 2022 and campaigned instead for Zweli Mkhize's election.

Ahead of the 2024 general election, Mkhize opposed proposals to enter into a coalition with the largest opposition party, the Democratic Alliance (DA), which she said was "the National Party of our day"; in her view, sharing political power with the DA was tantamount to "giving back power to apartheid". Mkhize advocated for competing with the Economic Freedom Fighters for the youth vote by not being "afraid to be seen to be radical".

== Personal life ==
Mkhize has children.
