= Pat Matosa =

South African politician

Provincial Chairperson of the Free State African National Congress
- In office 1994–1997
- Deputy: Ace Magashule
- Preceded by: Position established
- Succeeded by: Zingile Dingani

Personal details
- Born: Petrus Zanemvula Matosa Rouxville, Orange Free State; South Africa
- Party: African National Congress

Petrus Zanemvula "Pat" Matosa is a South African politician from the Free State. He represented the African National Congress (ANC) in the National Assembly from 1997 to 1999 and before that in the Free State Provincial Legislature from 1994 to 1997. His career as a public representative was cut short when he was convicted of the attempted murder of a traffic cop, though his conviction was later overturned.

Matosa was the Provincial Chairperson of the Free State ANC from 1994 to 1997 and later served as its Provincial Secretary from 2002 to 2005 and as Deputy Provincial Chairperson from 2005 to 2008. For much of that period, he was viewed as a close ally of Ace Magashule. During apartheid, he spent several years on Robben Island for his activities with Umkhonto we Sizwe.

== Early life and activism ==
Matosa was born in rural Rouxville in the former Orange Free State. He was a member of Umkhonto we Sizwe in the 1980s, at the height of apartheid, and in 1986 he was sentenced to 14 years' imprisonment for his role in an explosion at Phehello Secondary School in Odendaalsrus. Later, at the Truth and Reconciliation Commission, he additionally sought and received amnesty for his role in a 1985 attack on an ice rink in Welkom.

He was released from Robben Island early, in the early 1990s, and became a regional leader of the ANC, recently unbanned by the government, in the Northern Free State. In the Daily Maverick's phrase, he was known for "diving head first into Free State ANC political warfare almost from the second he was released from Robben Island"; in particular, he became an ally of Ace Magashule, then the chair of the ANC's Northern Free State region.

== Post-apartheid political career ==
=== ANC Provincial Chairperson: 1994–1996 ===
After South Africa's first post-apartheid elections in 1994, Matosa was elected to an ANC seat in the new Free State Provincial Legislature. Simultaneously he served as ANC Provincial Chairperson in the Free State from 1994 to 1997, with Magashule as his deputy. He had won that position, with Magashule's support, in a "surprise challenge" to Mosiuoa Lekota, who was the favoured candidate of the ANC's national leadership. Matosa won comfortably, receiving 263 votes against Lekota's 190; of the 81 local party branches in the region, Matosa was supported by 33, Lekota by 22, and Magashule by 26.

However, Lekota remained Premier of the Free State, which led, over the next few years, to a sustained power struggle between Lekota and his supporters, primarily from the southern Free State and powerful in the provincial government; and Matosa, Magashule, and their supporters, primarily from the northern Free State and powerful in the provincial party. Matosa consistently argued that the party had given Lekota his mandate to lead and that he should therefore consult the party before exercising his constitutional powers. Tensions peaked in June 1996, when Lekota fired Magashule from his ministerial position in the Free State Executive Council, accusing him of insubordination. The provincial party leadership responded with outrage, and Matosa said in a press conference:

Lekota had gone too far. ANC officials will not, as they did in the past, stand in the way of angry ANC members this time if they want to bring a motion of no confidence against him. Lekota cannot challenge the ANC. He must understand that he is an ordinary member. The ANC has the power to withdraw any ANC member from the legislature. All ANC members must toe the line. Lekota insists on a literal interpretation of the country's constitution, that he has the sole prerogative to decide on any matter concerning the province.

The ANC's national leadership intervened to mediate a negotiation, bringing the camps together for a meeting in Cape Town – attended by ANC President Nelson Mandela – at which they agreed to a compromise which saw Magashule reinstated to his government office. The agreement broke down shortly thereafter and, after a series of mutual recriminations, the national party intervened again: in November 1996, it disbanded Matosa's leadership corps, pending fresh leadership elections, and announced that Matosa would leave his seat in the provincial legislature to join the National Assembly. Several weeks later, the national party additionally announced that Matosa had agreed that he would not run for re-election as ANC Provincial Chairperson at the next provincial elective conference, nor would Magashule or Lekota run.

=== Attempted murder trial ===
Matosa served in the National Assembly until the next general election in 1999. During that time, he was charged with attempted murder in connection with an incident that had occurred near Theunissen on 3 June 1996. His colleague Vax Mayekiso had been driving him from Welkom to Bloemfontein and attempted to overtake another vehicle illegally; the driver of the other vehicle was a traffic cop and pulled Mayekiso over. According to the officer, he removed Mayekiso's car keys from the engine after Mayekiso refused to produce his driving license and threatened the officer with dismissal. Mayekiso then grabbed and began to throttle the officer, upon which Matosa cocked his 9mm pistol, held it to the officer's head, and pulled the trigger three times. The traffic cop was largely unharmed, because the gun was jammed. In their defence, Matosa and Mayekiso said that the cop had been aggressive and confrontational and had addressed them in Afrikaans, a language in which they were not fluent.

On 27 October 1997, Matosa was convicted by the Theunissen Magistrate's Court on an attempted murder charge, and was also convicted on the lesser charge of having brandished his firearm at another person, a former police officer, who arrived at the scene after the traffic cop. He was sentenced to five-and-a-half years' imprisonment and therefore would be ineligible to stand for re-election to Parliament. In the aftermath of the conviction, the ANC initially said that it would stand by Matosa through the appeals process, but the party ultimately gave in to public pressure and removed Matosa from its party list in the 1999 general election: until then, he had been ranked first on the provincial-to-national list for the Free State.

After a prolonged appeals process, the Bloemfontein Supreme Court of Appeal ruled in Matosa's favour in March 2001. The judge agreed with the trial court that Matosa and Mayekiso's testimony had not seemed wholly truthful but said that the state had not proved beyond a reasonable doubt that Matosa had intended to kill the cop when he pulled the gun's trigger. The judgement concluded that it was far more likely that Matosa had only intended to frighten the cop:

If [the traffic cop] knew, as he repeatedly stated, that [Matosa's] gun could not fire because it was jammed, [Matosa], who as a former member of Umkhonto we Sizwe had had training in the use of handguns, must also have known it. If that is so, he could as a matter of logic, not have had the true intention to kill [the traffic cop]... It is almost inconceivable that [Matosa], even making every allowance for the possibility that he acted in the heat of the moment and in a burst of anger, could truly have intended to murder [the traffic cop] when the provocation was so inconsequential and the consequences potentially so disastrous.

Matosa's attempted murder conviction was therefore set aside and commuted to a charge of wilfully pointing a firearm at the officer; he was sentenced to pay a R1,200 fine or serve 120 days' imprisonment, in addition to a R600 fine on the other, separate charge of brandishing a firearm. Matosa expressed delight at the judgement, saying, "This evil conspiracy against me has finally been defeated. This judgment has set me free."

=== Return to the Free State ANC: 2002–2008 ===
In July 2002, Matosa returned to the provincial leadership of the ANC when he was elected ANC Provincial Secretary, serving under Provincial Chairperson Magashule. Matosa and Magashule were viewed as having collaborated to win the election over incumbent Premier Winkie Direko, but, according to Matosa, their relationship deteriorated over the next several years as Magashule sought to "isolate" him politically. Nonetheless, at the end of his three-year term as Provincial Secretary in June 2005, Matosa was elected to deputise Magashule as ANC Deputy Provincial Chairperson, an office he held until the next provincial elective conference in 2008.

During that time, in the run-up to the ANC's 52nd National Conference, Matosa supported Tokyo Sexwale's unsuccessful campaign to be elected as ANC president. Sexwale sought to present himself as a compromise candidate amid the two frontrunners, incumbent Thabo Mbeki and his deputy Jacob Zuma. Matosa ran the Free State wing of Sexwale's campaign.

Matosa's term as Deputy Provincial Chairperson ended in July 2008. As his relationship with Magashule worsened, he was considered a possible candidate to challenge Magashule for the provincial chairmanship, but he did not ultimately stand.
