= Azanian Students' Organisation =

The Azanian Students Organisation (AZASO) was a student movement in South Africa founded in 1979 as a replacement for the banned South African Student Organisation (SASO). It would become the South African National Students Congress (SANSCO) in 1986, after adopting the Educational Charter and aligning itself officially with the Freedom Charter. This was to be merged in 1991 with the National Union of South African Students to form the South African Students Congress.

== History ==
Following the banning of the South African Student Organisation (SASO), a new student’s structure was constituted to fill the void. The new structure, called the Azanian Student Organisation (AZASO), was established in 1979 by students from five black universities and one college of education. AZASO, which was formed under Tom Nkoane, though it initially emerged as a continuation of SASO, later manifested itself as a different organisation that adopted African National Congress (ANC) policies and the Freedom Charter over the Black Consciousness Doctrine. In addition, AZASO advocated a non-racial policy towards working with other youth organisations, while SASO's philosophy of Black Consciousness called for a total break away from White student structures and as such they did not co-operate with them.

AZASO also secured political cooperation with other ANC-aligned formations such as the United Democratic Front (UDF) and the Congress of South African Students (COSAS). All these developments highlighted a drift by AZASO from the philosophy of Black Consciousness and its associated organisations like SASO and the Black People's Convention (BPC).
