= List of members of the 2nd Free State Provincial Legislature =

2nd Free State Provincial Legislature
←	1st Legislature	3rd Legislature	→
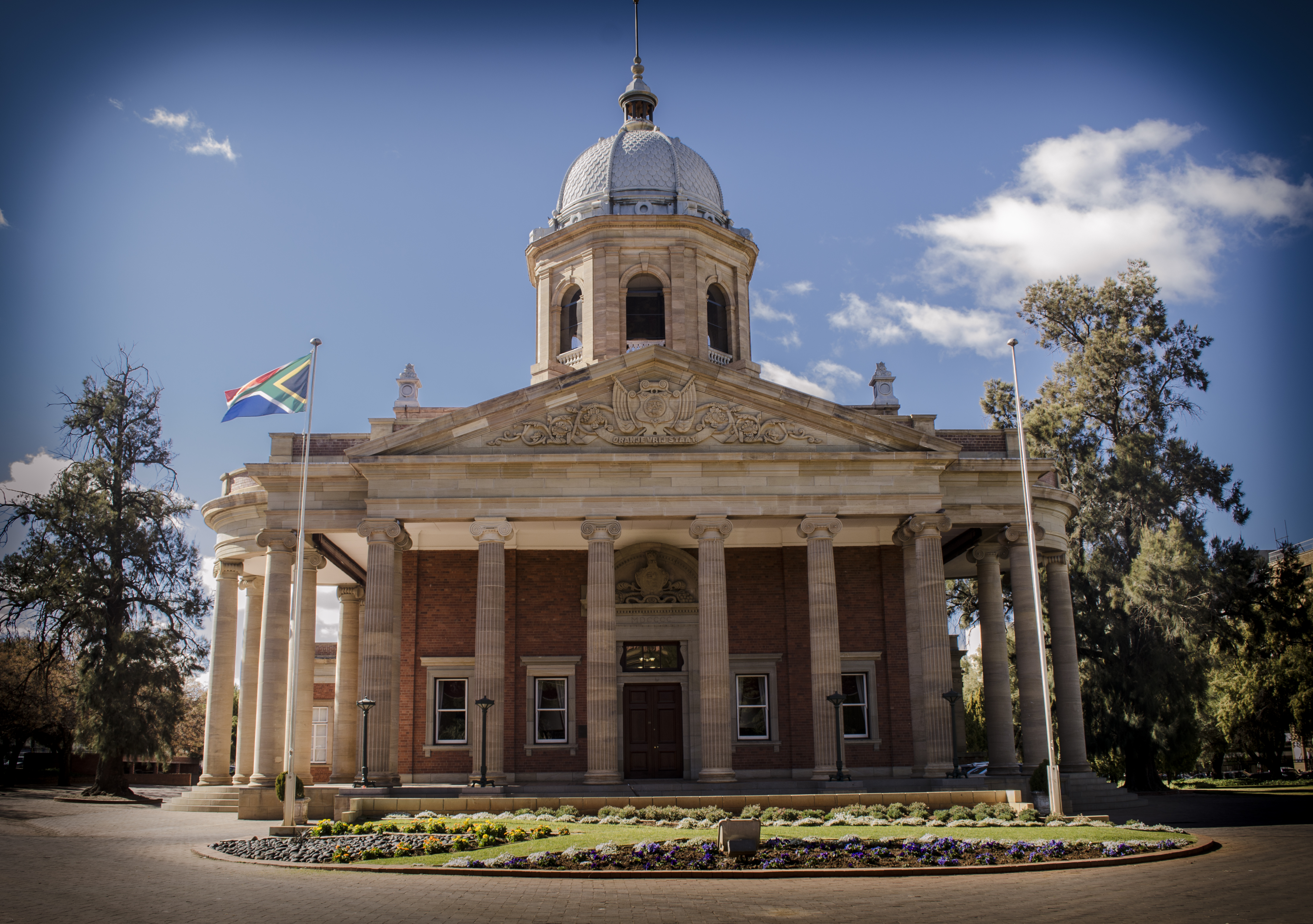
- Fourth Raadsaal, Bloemfontein

Overview
- Legislative body: Free State Provincial Legislature
- Jurisdiction: Free State, South Africa
- Meeting place: Fourth Raadsaal
- Term: June 1999 – April 2004
- Election: 2 June 1999
- Members: 30
- Premier: Winkie Direko

This is a list of members of the second Free State Provincial Legislature as elected in the election of 2 June 1999. In that election, the African National Congress (ANC) consolidated its majority in the legislature, winning 25 of 30 seats. The Democratic Party (DP), with two seats, was represented in the legislature for the first time. Also with two seats, the New National Party (NNP) had halved its minority, as had the Freedom Front (FF), which retained only one seat.

The ANC's Winkie Direko was elected as the third Premier of the Free State. She was a newcomer to the provincial legislature, as were 18 of the other 24 members of the ANC's caucus. The caucus was reshuffled in June 2001, with some ANC members swopping seats with national legislators.

== Composition ==
Party	Seats
African National Congress	25
Democratic Party	2
New National Party	2
FF	1
Total	30

== Members ==
The table below lists the Members of the Free State Provincial Legislature as elected on 2 June 1999. It does not take into account changes in the composition of the legislature after the election.

Member	Party
Anna Buthelezi	ANC
Zingile Dingani	ANC
Winkie Direko	ANC
Zanele Dlungwana	ANC
Mxolisi Dukwana	ANC
Papi Kganare	ANC
Nthabiseng Pauline Khunou	ANC
Butana Komphela	ANC
Benny Kotsoane	ANC
Queen Letsoha	ANC
Joel Mafereka	ANC
Tate Makgoe	ANC
Sekhopi Malebo	ANC
Webster Mfebe	ANC
Bafunani Aaron Mnguni	ANC
Casca Mokitlane	ANC
Ngaka Leonard Monareng	ANC
Hans Nketu	ANC
Edwin Noe	ANC
Sisi Ntombela	ANC
Mann Oelrich	ANC
Tutu Ralane	ANC
Itumeleng Segalo	ANC
Lechesa Tsenoli	ANC
Mantsheng Tsopo	ANC
Pieter Benjamin Geldenhuys	DP
Darryl Arthur Worth	DP
Jacobus Marthinus Aucamp	NNP
Philippus Johannes Cornelis Nel	NNP
Abrie Oosthuizen	FF
