= List of members of the 5th Free State Provincial Legislature =

This is a list of members of the fifth Free State Provincial Legislature as elected in the election of 7 May 2014. In that election, the African National Congress (ANC) maintained its comfortable majority of 22 seats in the 30-seat legislature. The Democratic Alliance regained the status of official opposition.

During the legislature's first sitting on 21 May 2014, the ANC's Ace Magashule was elected unopposed to a second term as Premier of the Free State. Sisi Mabe was elected as Speaker of the Free State Legislature. After Mabe died in late 2014, she was succeeded by Mamiki Qabathe from 11 March 2015.

== Composition ==
Party	Seats
African National Congress	22
Democratic Alliance	5
Economic Freedom Fighters	2
VF+	1
Total	30

== Members ==
The table below lists the Members of the Free State Provincial Legislature as elected in May 2014. It does not take into account changes in the composition of the legislature after the election.

Member	Party
Mojalefa Patrick Buti	ANC
Oupa Khoabane	ANC
Butana Komphela	ANC
Dora Kotzee	ANC
Mathabo Leeto	ANC
Sisi Mabe	ANC
Ace Magashule	ANC
Limakatso Mahasa	ANC
Tate Makgoe	ANC
Benny Malakoane	ANC
Lucy Mapena	ANC
Sam Mashinini	ANC
Sizwe Isaak Mbalo	ANC
Thabo Meeko	ANC
Olly Mlamleli	ANC
Sarah Moleleki	ANC
Sisi Ntombela	ANC
Mamiki Qabathe	ANC
Elzabe Rockman	ANC
Cecilia Shirley Kediinametse Sechoaro	ANC
Cornelis Johannes van Rooyen	ANC
Mosebenzi Zwane	ANC
Roy Jankielsohn	DA
David Edward Janse van Vuuren	DA
Leona Mary Kleynhans	DA
James Letuka	DA
Mariette Pittaway	DA
Mandisa Makesini	EFF
Jacob Tsietsi Tshabalala	EFF
Wouter Wessels	FF+
