= List of members of the 3rd Free State Provincial Legislature =

This is a list of members of the third Free State Provincial Legislature as elected in the election of 14 April 2004. In that election, the African National Congress (ANC) retained its majority in the legislature, holding 25 of 30 seats. The ANC's Beatrice Marshoff was elected as Premier of the Free State. Also from the ANC, Mxolisi Dukwana was re-elected as Speaker of the Free State Provincial Legislature, and Gertrude Mothupi became his deputy.

The Democratic Alliance, with three seats, was the official opposition in the legislature. The Freedom Front Plus (FF+) retained its single seat and the African Christian Democratic Party (ACDP) gained representation for the first time, also with a single seat. The New National Party was not represented, losing both of the two seats it had won in the previous term.

== Composition ==
Party	Seats
African National Congress	25
DA	3
African Christian Democratic Party	1
VF+	1
Total	30

== Members ==
The table below lists the Members of the Free State Provincial Legislature as elected in April 2004. It does not take into account changes in the composition of the legislature after the election.

Member	Party
Casper Nordier	ACDP
Sakhiwo Belot	ANC
Anna Buthelezi	ANC
Zanele Dlungwana	ANC
Mxolisi Dukwana	ANC
Peter Khoarai	ANC
Benny Kotsoane	ANC
Charlotte Lobe	ANC
Joel Mafereka	ANC
Ace Magashule	ANC
Tate Makgoe	ANC
Benny Malakoane	ANC
Peter Maloka	ANC
Tony Marais	ANC
Beatrice Marshoff	ANC
Susan Mnumzana	ANC
Tjheta Mofokeng	ANC
Thoko Mofokeng	ANC
Seiso Mohai	ANC
Casca Mokitlane	ANC
Playfair Morule	ANC
Gertrude Mothupi	ANC
Hans Nketu	ANC
Tutu Ralane	ANC
German Ramathebane	ANC
Mantoa Thoabala	ANC
Basil Alexander	DA
Andries Botha	DA
Peter Frewen	DA
Abrie Oosthuizen	FF+
