= Ramakatsa v Magashule =

South African legal case

- Court: Constitutional Court of South Africa
- Full case name: Ramakatsa and Others v Magashule and Others
- Decided: 18 December 2012
- Docket nos.: CCT 109/12
- Citations: [2012] ZACC 31; 2013 (2) BCLR 202 (CC)

Case history
- Appealed from: High Court of South Africa, Free State Division – Ramakatsa and Others v Magashule and Others [2012] ZAFSHC 207

Court membership
- Judges sitting: Mogoeng CJ, Moseneke DCJ, Cameron J (leave to appeal only), Froneman J, Jafta J, Khampepe J, Nkabinde J, Skweyiya J, van der Westhuizen J (merits only), Yacoob J and Zondo J

Case opinions
- Section 19(1)(b) of the Constitution obligates every political party to act lawfully and in accordance with its own constitution. (Unanimous.) Leave to appeal is granted. (9:1) The African National Congress's June 2012 provincial elective conference in the Free State was unlawful and invalid. (7:3)
- Decision by: Yacoob J (Mogoeng, Moseneke, Cameron, Jafta, Khampepe, Nkabinde, Skweyiya and Zondo concurring on leave to appeal); Moseneke DCJ and Jafta J (Khampepe, Nkabinde, Skweyiya, van der Westhuizen and Zondo concurring on the merits)
- Dissent: Froneman J (Yacoob and Mogoeng concurring on the merits)

Keywords
- Horizontal effect; participatory democracy; political parties; section 19(1)(b) of the Constitution

Ramakatsa and Others v Magashule and Others is a 2012 decision of the Constitutional Court of South Africa on the internal governance of political parties and the section 19 right to participate in political party activities. The court reviewed and overturned an internal elective conference held by the African National Congress (ANC) in Parys, Free State in June 2012. This had the effect of invalidating the election of the Free State ANC's provincial leadership, including the election of Ace Magashule as ANC Provincial Chairperson.

Writing for a majority of the court, Deputy Chief Justice Dikgang Moseneke and Justice Chris Jafta held that the Constitution obligates political parties to act lawfully, in accordance with their own constitutions, and otherwise in a manner that preserves their members' political rights. Thus, insofar as the ANC had disenfranchised its members by ignoring electoral irregularities in the internal conference, it had violated its members' constitutional rights as well as their contractual rights.

== Background ==
Between 21 and 24 June 2012 in Parys, the Free State provincial branch of the African National Congress (ANC) held its provincial elective conference. It elected the Free State ANC's new Provincial Executive Committee (PEC), which would serve for the next four years and which included the provincial party's executive leaders, including the Provincial Chairperson. All five executive leaders were elected unopposed, and Ace Magashule, who was also the Premier of the Free State, secured his fourth consecutive term as Provincial Chairperson. Their election was unopposed because their opponents, led by outgoing ANC Provincial Treasurer Mxolisi Dukwana, boycotted the elective conference, alleging that there had been election fraud.

In particular, Dukwana and his supporters alleged that there had been irregularities in the selection of the delegates who attended the provincial elective conference and voted in the election. According to the ANC's constitution, these delegates were mandated by their local party branch at branch general meetings, through a designated procedure. Dukwana's supporters alleged that many of the delegates who attended the provincial conference had been selected according to improper procedures, in violation of the ANC constitution, in order to predetermine a victory for Magashule and his faction. Thus, they claimed, the provincial conference was improperly constituted and the electoral outcomes were invalid.

However, the National Executive Committee of the ANC endorsed the results of the provincial conference, with national ANC Secretary-General Gwede Mantashe validating an audit of the delegates. Dukwana's supporters suggested that Mantashe and other national party leaders were complicit in the Magashule faction's fraud: the outcomes of the provincial conference had national political significance, especially because the PEC would be voting delegates to the ANC's 53rd National Conference, which was to be held in December 2012. Unlike Dukwana's faction, Magashule's faction was supportive of incumbent ANC President Jacob Zuma, and, were Zuma to win a second term in the ANC presidency in December 2012, he would also become the party's presidential candidate in the 2014 general election. Because of the ANC's electoral dominance, its national conference – and therefore also its provincial conferences – would have an indirect but significant effect on the outcome of the presidential election.

== Prior action ==
In August 2012, six ordinary branch members of the Free State ANC, led by Mpho Ramakatsa, applied to the High Court of South Africa to challenge the propriety of the provincial conference. Represented by Dali Mpofu, they sought an order nullifying the outcomes of the leadership elections held at the conference. They named 26 respondents, including the 25 members of the PEC elected at the conference – Provincial Chairperson Magashule, Deputy Provincial Chairperson Thabo Manyoni, Provincial Secretary William Bulwane, Deputy Provincial Secretary Mamiki Qabathe, Provincial Treasurer Msebenzi Zwane, and 20 additional members – and the national ANC itself.

The application was heard in the High Court's Free State Division on 11 October 2012. Judge M. H. Rampai dismissed their application on 26 October, handing down judgment on 13 November. He did not consider the merits of the application but dismissed it on the grounds that there were several fatal procedural defects in the case.

The applicants sought to bypass the regular process of appeals, lodging an urgent application to appeal directly to the apex court, the Constitutional Court of South Africa. The urgent application for direct leave to appeal was heard in the Constitutional Court on 20 November 2012, and, after that application was granted, the merits of the appeal were heard on 29 November 2012. The court handed down separate orders after each hearing but conjoined its reasons in a single judgment, handed down on 18 December 2012.

== Judgments ==
=== Leave to appeal ===
==== Majority opinion ====
On 21 November 2012, after hearing the urgent application for leave to appeal, the court handed down an order granting leave to appeal and scheduling a hearing on the merits for 29 November 2012; the respondents were invited to file further papers opposing the merits of the appellants' case, if so inclined. This order had the support of a nine-to-one majority, comprising Chief Justice Mogoeng Mogoeng, Deputy Chief Justice Dikgang Moseneke, and Justices Edwin Cameron, Chris Jafta, Sisi Khampepe, Bess Nkabinde, Thembile Skweyiya, Zak Yacoob, and Raymond Zondo. Their reasons were set out in an opinion written by Justice Yacoob.

==== Minority opinion ====
The sole dissenting opinion was written by Justice Johan Froneman. He held that, although the matter invoked political rights protected by the Constitution, and although the appeal had reasonable prospects of success, it was not in the interests of justice for the Constitutional Court to hear the merits urgently and as a court of first instance: the applicants' argument might justify urgent hearing in the High Court or in the intermediate Supreme Court of Appeal, but it raised "no issue that needs urgent constitutional clarification in the national or public interest". Although "the practical reality" might be that ANC provincial conferences affect the outcome of general elections, that is not a reality recognised by the Constitution, according to which the President of South Africa is elected by the National Assembly.

=== Merits ===
==== Majority opinion ====
After hearing the merits of the appeal, a majority of the Constitutional Court upheld the appeal on 18 December 2012. The majority comprised Deputy Chief Justice Moseneke and Justice Jafta, who together wrote the majority's opinion on the merits, as well as Justices Khampepe, Nkabinde, Skweyiya, Zondo, and Johann van der Westhuizen. Van der Westhuizen, who had not heard the original application for leave to appeal, joined the coram in place of Justice Cameron, who did not hear the merits.

In their opinion, Moseneke and Jafta held that, factually, the ANC provincial conference had not been properly constituted in terms of the ANC Constitution; as the applicants claimed, the delegates had not been properly audited and accredited. On these grounds, aggrieved party members had a common law claim of contractual infringement against the ANC, since the party's constitution was a contract between the party and its members. More significantly, the majority held that the breach was not just contractual but also constitutional. It reached this conclusion by exploring the relationship between political parties and the political rights protected by section 19 of the Constitution, which the court sought to give a historical and purposive application.

In particular, section 19(1)(b) of the Constitution protects every citizen's right "to participate in the activities of... a political party". As private organisations, individual political parties may choose how to regulate their members' exercise of the section 19(1)(b) participation right; the ANC did so through its constitution and subsidiary rules. However, the court held that section 19(1)(b) binds each political party to adopt internal rules that are consistent with the Constitution – and that therefore protect the party's members participation rights – and, importantly for the current case, binds each political party "to act lawfully and in accordance with its own constitution". The irregularities in the Free State conference therefore violated the applicants' right to participate in the activities of their political party, the ANC. The court nullified the provincial conference, and its electoral outcomes, on these grounds, declaring them unlawful and invalid.

==== Minority opinion ====
Froneman's was again the dissenting opinion: although he would not have granted the applicants' leave to appeal, he held that the appeal should in any case fail on the merits. He agreed with the majority that it was a clear consequence of section 19 that "the right to participate in the activities of a political party imposes a duty on every political party to act lawfully and in accordance with its own constitution". However, the "factual basis" for the court's review was the assertion that the ANC had failed to investigate the alleged procedural irregularities, thereby violating its own constitution. This factual basis, according to Froneman, was "unfounded". The respondents, notably ANC Secretary-General Mantashe, had filed affidavits disputing that assertion, and Plascon-Evans obliged the court to accept those opposing affidavits as factually correct. Chief Justice Mogoeng and Justice Yacoob concurred in Froneman's judgment on the merits and would also have dismissed the appeal, though they had disagreed with Froneman about the preliminary grant of leave to appeal.

== Aftermath ==
After the judgment was handed down, the ANC National Executive Committee abided by the Constitutional Court's decision and disbanded the Free State PEC as elected at the June 2012 conference. The elected members were therefore barred from voting at the 52nd National Conference later that week, though Zuma nonetheless won re-election to the ANC presidency. The Free State ANC was led by an interim task team until May 2013, when the provincial elective conference was re-run with fresh elections. The same five executive leaders, including Magashule as Provincial Chairperson, were elected to the same positions they had won illegitimately in June 2012.

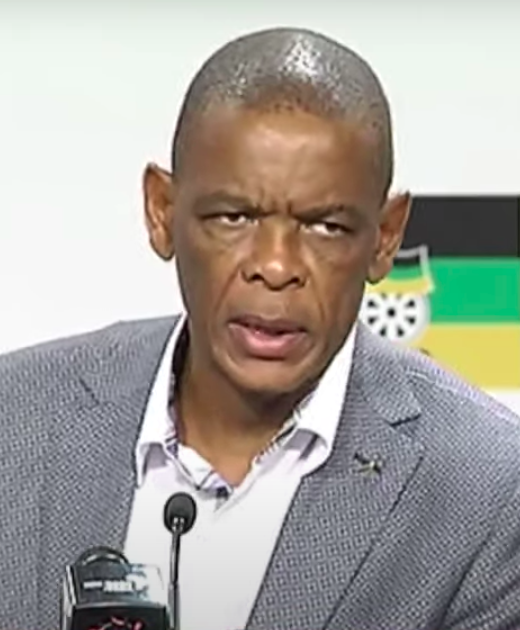
The ruling removed Ace Magashule from office as ANC Provincial Chairperson

The Ramakatsa conference was used to challenge several other elections in the Free State ANC. The next provincial elective conference, held in December 2017 in the run-up to the ANC's 53rd National Conference, resembled the June 2012 conference in various respects: Magashule was re-elected unopposed after his opponent, this time Thabo Manyoni, boycotted the conference, alleging irregularities. The December 2017 election was also nullified, this time by the Bloemfontein High Court, after the court found that there had indeed been electoral irregularities inconsistent with the ANC constitution. The December 2017 conference was re-run in June 2018 and elected Sam Mashinini as Provincial Chairperson, but it too was declared invalid.

In 2021, Magashule himself relied on Ramakatsa in his legal challenge to the ANC's internal step-aside rule and its use to suspend him from the party. In that matter, he was represented by Dali Mpofu, counsel for the Ramakatsa applicants.

== Significance ==
Ramakatsa v Magashule was the first time that the Constitutional Court permitted an individual to base a cause of action against another non-state actor solely and directly on the contents of a constitutional right (in contrast to Khumalo v Holomisa, where the constitutional right had been used to develop existing common law). It was therefore the strongest instance yet of a horizontal application of the Bill of Rights to private relationships.

More specifically, it provided an influential conception of the role of political parties in participatory democracy; in New Nation Movement v President, the court grappled with Ramakatsa's application or lack thereof to the constitutional status of independent candidates. Insofar as it expanded jurisprudence on the interpretation of section 19 of the Constitution, Pierre de Vos viewed Ramakatsa as a "slight correction" to the court's earlier judgments in United Democratic Movement v President and New National Party v Government, which had been criticised for espousing a "narrow and formalistic view" of democracy and political rights.

De Vos also argued that Ramakatsa, and particularly the obiter finding that party constitutions must be consistent with the national Constitution, affirmed a strong link between internal party democracy and political freedoms and could be interpreted to place a positive duty on Parliament to pass a "party law" to regulate minimum standards of internal party democracy.
