= Executive Council of the Free State =

Provincial government in South Africa

The Executive Council of the Free State is the cabinet of the executive branch of the provincial government in the South African province of the Free State. The Members of the Executive Council (MECs) are appointed from among the members of the Free State Provincial Legislature by the Premier of the Free State, an office held since May 2024 by Maqueen Letsoha-Mathae of the African National Congress (ANC).

== Direko premiership: 1999–2004 ==
Winkie Direko was elected as the Free State's third Premier in the 1999 general election. She reshuffled her Executive Council on 28 June 2001, firing three MECs: Tate Makgoe, Anna Buthelezi-Phori, and Casca Mokitlane.

Free State Executive Council 1999–2004
Post	Member	Term		Party
Premier of the Free State	Winkie Direko	1999	2004	ANC
MEC for Finance	Zingile Dingani	1999	2004	ANC
MEC for Health	Mantsheng Tsopo	1999	2004	ANC
MEC for Education	Papi Kganare	1999	2004	ANC
MEC for Agriculture	Mann Oelrich	2001		ANC
MEC for Agriculture	Tate Makgoe	1999	2001	ANC
MEC for Tourism and Environmental and Economic Affairs	Sakhiwo Belot	2001	2004	ANC
MEC for Tourism and Environmental and Economic Affairs	Benny Kotsoane	1999	2001	ANC
MEC for Public Works, Roads and Transport	Sekhopi Malebo			ANC
MEC for Local Government and Housing	Lechesa Tsenoli	1999	2004	ANC
MEC for Safety and Security	Benny Kotsoane	2001	2004	ANC
MEC for Safety and Security	Casca Mokitlane	1999	2001	ANC
MEC for Social Development and Welfare	Beatrice Marshoff	2001	2004	ANC
MEC for Social Development and Welfare	Anna Buthelezi-Phori		2001	ANC
MEC for Sports, Arts, Culture, Science and Technology	Webster Mfebe	1999	2004	ANC

== Marshoff premiership: 2004–2009 ==
Beatrice Marshoff was elected Premier in the 2004 general elections; her new Executive Council was sworn in on 3 May 2004. In April 2005, over the course of two weeks, Marshoff announced two wide-ranging reshuffles in which three MECs – Ace Magashule, Itumeleng Benny Kotsoane, and Benny Malakoane – were sacked and others changed portfolios. In August 2007, in another reshuffle, Magashule was returned to the cabinet and another MEC, Playfair Morule, was removed; several other MECs also changed portfolios.

In January 2008, Mxolisi Dukwana was appointed as MEC for Public Safety and Security and Mamiki Qabathe was appointed MEC for Agriculture. In October that year, both changed portfolios, along with two other MECs, in a reshuffle affecting four portfolios but involving no sackings. In February 2009, Dukwana additionally took on, in an acting capacity, the education portfolio, after Education MEC Casca Mokitlane resigned and defected from the ANC ahead of the 2009 general election.

Free State Executive Council 2004–2009
Post	Member	Term		Party
Premier of the Free State	Beatrice Marshoff	2004	2009	ANC
MEC for Finance	Tate Makgoe	2005	2009	ANC
MEC for Finance	Playfair Morule	2004	2005	ANC
MEC for Health	Sakhiwo Belot	2004	2009	ANC
MEC for Education	Casca Mokitlane	2007	2009	ANC
MEC for Education	Mantsheng Tsopo	2004	2007	ANC
MEC for Tourism, Environmental and Economic Affairs	Mxolisi Dukwana	2008	2009	ANC
MEC for Tourism, Environmental and Economic Affairs	Neo Masithela	2005	2008	ANC
MEC for Tourism, Environmental and Economic Affairs	Benny Malakoane	2004	2005	ANC
MEC for Public Works, Roads and Transport	Seiso Mohai	2004	2009	ANC
MEC for Agriculture	Neo Masithela	2008	2009	ANC
MEC for Agriculture	Mamiki Qabathe	2008	2008	ANC
MEC for Agriculture	Susan Mnumzana	2007	2008	ANC
MEC for Agriculture	Casca Mokitlane	2005	2007	ANC
MEC for Agriculture	Ace Magashule	2004	2005	ANC
MEC for Local Government and Housing	Joel Mafereka	2005	2009	ANC
MEC for Local Government and Housing	Benny Kotsoane	2004	2005	ANC
MEC for Public Safety, Security and Liaison	Ace Magashule	2008	2009	ANC
MEC for Public Safety, Security and Liaison	Mxolisi Dukwana	2008	2008	ANC
MEC for Public Safety, Security and Liaison	Zanele Dlungwana	2007	2008	ANC
MEC for Public Safety, Security and Liaison	Playfair Morule	2005	2007	ANC
MEC for Public Safety, Security and Liaison	Tate Makgoe	2004	2005	ANC
MEC for Social Development	Mantsheng Tsopo	2007	2009	ANC
MEC for Social Development	Zanele Dlungwana	2004	2007	ANC
MEC for Sports, Arts and Culture	Mamiki Qabathe	2008	2009	ANC
MEC for Sports, Arts and Culture	Ace Magashule	2007	2008	ANC
MEC for Sports, Arts, Culture, Science and Technology	Susan Mnumzana	2005	2007	ANC
MEC for Sports, Arts, Culture, Science and Technology	Joel Mafereka	2004	2005	ANC

== Magashule premiership ==
=== First term: 2009–2014 ===
On 11 May 2009, following his election as Premier in the 2009 general election, Ace Magashule announced his new Executive Council, which included six new appointments; in addition, the names of four departments were changed. In February 2011, Magashule announced a reshuffle in which four MECs changed portfolios and in which responsibility for rural development was moved from the public works portfolio to the agriculture portfolio. In June of that year, he appointed Butana Komphela to replace Thabo Manyoni as MEC for Police, Roads and Transport; Manyoni had left the provincial government to become Mayor of Mangaung.

Magashule effected two further reshuffles before the end of the provincial legislature's term. In February 2012, he fired Economic Development MEC Mxolisi Dukwana and replaced him with Mamiki Qabathe; Olly Mlamleli was appointed to the Executive Council to take over Qabathe's former portfolio. In March 2013, Magashule fired Finance MEC Seiso Mohai, replacing him with Elzabe Rockman, and appointed Benny Malakoane to fill the vacancy in the health portfolio that had arisen after Fezi Ngumbentombi's death in December 2012; Qabathe also swopped portfolios with Msebenzi Zwane.

Free State Executive Council 2009–2014
Post	Member	Term		Party
Premier of the Free State	Ace Magashule	2009	2014	ANC
MEC for Finance	Elzabe Rockman	2013	2014	ANC
MEC for Finance	Seiso Mohai	2009	2013	ANC
MEC for Health	Benny Malakoane	2013	2014	ANC
MEC for Health	Fezi Ngumbentombi	2011	2012	ANC
MEC for Health	Sisi Mabe	2009	2011	ANC
MEC for Education	Tate Makgoe	2009	2014	ANC
MEC for Economic Development, Tourism and Environmental Affairs	Msebenzi Zwane	2013	2014	ANC
MEC for Economic Development, Tourism and Environmental Affairs	Mamiki Qabathe	2012	2013	ANC
MEC for Economic Development, Tourism and Environmental Affairs	Mxolisi Dukwana	2009	2012	ANC
MEC for Police, Roads and Transport	Butana Komphela	2011	2014	ANC
MEC for Police, Roads and Transport	Thabo Manyoni	2009	2011	ANC
MEC for Agriculture and Rural Development	Mamiki Qabathe	2013	2014	ANC
MEC for Agriculture and Rural Development	Msebenzi Zwane	2011	2013	ANC
MEC for Agriculture	Mamiki Qabathe	2009	2011	ANC
MEC for Public Works and Rural Development	Fezi Ngumbentombi	2009	2011	ANC
MEC for Public Works	Sisi Mabe	2011	2014	ANC
MEC for Cooperative Governance, Traditional Affairs and Human Settlements	Olly Mlamleli	2012	2014	ANC
MEC for Cooperative Governance, Traditional Affairs and Human Settlements	Mamiki Qabathe	2011	2012	ANC
MEC for Cooperative Governance, Traditional Affairs and Human Settlements	Msebenzi Zwane	2009	2011	ANC
MEC for Social Development	Sisi Ntombela	2009	2014	ANC
MEC for Sports, Arts, Culture and Recreation	Dan Kgothule	2009	2014	ANC

=== Second term: 2014–2018 ===
Pursuant to his re-election in the 2014 general election, Magashule announced his new Executive Council on 29 May 2014. He made only limited changes, replacing Dan Kgothule with Mathabo Leeto as MEC for Sports, Arts, Culture and Recreation and replacing Sisi Mabe, who became Speaker of the provincial legislature, with Sam Mashinini as MEC for Public Works. He also added small business development to Msebenzi Zwane's economic development portfolio.

In May 2015, Magashule announced the first reshuffle of his second term, occasioned by the departure of Mamiki Qabathe, who succeeded Mabe as Speaker. In September 2015, Zwane, who had replaced Qabathe in the agriculture portfolio in the May reshuffle, was sworn into the National Assembly to become national Minister of Mineral Resources; he was replaced in the Executive Council by Oupa Khoabane. In October the following year, Magashule announced a wide-ranging reshuffle, occasioned by the departure of Mlamleli, who had been elected Mayor of Mangaung in the local government elections in August; Limakatso Mahasa was the only new appointment made, although the reshuffle affected five portfolios.

Free State Executive Council 2014–2018
Post	Member	Term		Party
Premier of the Free State	Ace Magashule	2014	2018	ANC
MEC for Finance	Elzabe Rockman	2014	2018	ANC
MEC for Health	Butana Komphela	2016	2018	ANC
MEC for Health	Benny Malakoane	2014	2016	ANC
MEC for Education	Tate Makgoe	2014	2018	ANC
MEC for Economic and Small Business Development, Tourism and Environmental Affairs	Benny Malakoane	2016	2018	ANC
MEC for Economic and Small Business Development, Tourism and Environmental Affairs	Sam Mashinini	2015	2016	ANC
MEC for Economic and Small Business Development, Tourism and Environmental Affairs	Msebenzi Zwane	2014	2015	ANC
MEC for Police, Roads and Transport	Sam Mashinini	2016	2018	ANC
MEC for Police, Roads and Transport	Butana Komphela	2014	2016	ANC
MEC for Agriculture and Rural Development	Oupa Khoabane	2015	2018	ANC
MEC for Agriculture and Rural Development	Msebenzi Zwane	2015	2015	ANC
MEC for Agriculture and Rural Development	Mamiki Qabathe	2014	2015	ANC
MEC for Public Works and Infrastructure	Dorah Coetzee	2015	2018	ANC
MEC for Public Works and Infrastructure	Sam Mashinini	2014	2015	ANC
MEC for Cooperative Governance, Traditional Affairs and Human Settlements	Sisi Ntombela	2016	2018	ANC
MEC for Cooperative Governance, Traditional Affairs and Human Settlements	Olly Mlamleli	2014	2016	ANC
MEC for Social Development	Limakatso Mahasa	2016	2018	ANC
MEC for Social Development	Sisi Ntombela	2014	2016	ANC
MEC for Sports, Arts, Culture and Recreation	Mathabo Leeto	2014	2018	ANC

== Ntombela premiership ==
=== First term: 2018–2019 ===
Sisi Ntombela was sworn in as Premier in March 2018; she succeeded Ace Magashule, who had resigned to take up the position of ANC Secretary-General. Although she initially retained all of Magashule's MECs, she announced a reshuffle on 9 May 2018. Five portfolios were affected, but no MECs were fired; indeed, because Ntombela's promotion had left a vacancy in the Executive Council, one new MEC, Montseng Tsiu, was appointed. In the same reshuffle, responsibility for human settlements was transferred from the cooperative governance and traditional affairs portfolio to Dorah Coetzee's public works and infrastructure portfolio.

Free State Executive Council 2018–2019
Post	Member	Term		Party
Premier of the Free State	Sisi Ntombela	2018	2019	ANC
MEC for Finance	Elzabe Rockman	2018	2019	ANC
MEC for Health	Montseng Tsiu	2018	2019	ANC
MEC for Health	Butana Komphela	2018	2018	ANC
MEC for Education	Tate Makgoe	2018	2019	ANC
MEC for Economic and Small Business Development, Tourism and Environmental Affairs	Limakatso Mahasa	2018	2019	ANC
MEC for Economic and Small Business Development, Tourism and Environmental Affairs	Benny Malakoane	2018	2018	ANC
MEC for Police, Roads and Transport	Sam Mashinini	2018	2019	ANC
MEC for Agriculture and Rural Development	Benny Malakoane	2018	2019	ANC
MEC for Agriculture and Rural Development	Oupa Khoabane	2018	2018	ANC
MEC for Public Works, Infrastructure and Human Settlements	Dorah Coetzee	2018	2019	ANC
MEC for Public Works and Infrastructure	Dorah Coetzee	2018	2018	ANC
MEC for Cooperative Governance and Traditional Affairs	Oupa Khoabane	2018	2019	ANC
MEC for Social Development	Butana Komphela	2018	2019	ANC
MEC for Social Development	Limakatso Mahasa	2018	2018	ANC
MEC for Sports, Arts, Culture and Recreation	Mathabo Leeto	2018	2019	ANC

=== Second term: 2019–2023 ===
Ntombela was elected to a full term as Premier in the 2019 general election and she announced her new Executive Council in late May. On 1 October 2021, she announced a reshuffle affecting three portfolios, in which Sam Mashinini was fired. She resigned as premier in February 2023.

Free State Executive Council 2019–2023
Post	Member	Term		Party
Premier of the Free State	Sisi Ntombela	2019	2023	ANC
MEC for Finance	Gadija Brown	2019	2023	ANC
MEC for Health	Montseng Tsiu	2019	2023	ANC
MEC for Education	Tate Makgoe	2019	2023	ANC
MEC for Agriculture and Rural Development	Thembeni Nxangisa	2021	2023	ANC
MEC for Agriculture and Rural Development	William Bulwane	2019	2021	ANC
MEC for Economic, Small Business Development, Tourism and Environmental Affairs	Makalo Mohale	2019	2023	ANC
MEC for Police, Roads and Transport	William Bulwane	2021	2023	ANC
MEC for Police, Roads and Transport	Sam Mashinini	2019	2021	ANC
MEC for Public Works and Human Settlements	Motshidisi Koloi	2019	2023	ANC
MEC for Cooperative Governance and Traditional Affairs	Mxolisi Dukwana	2021	2023	ANC
MEC for Cooperative Governance and Traditional Affairs	Thembeni Nxangisa	2019	2021	ANC
MEC for Social Development	Mamiki Qabathe	2019	2023	ANC
MEC for Sports, Arts, Culture and Recreation	Limakatso Mahasa	2019	2023	ANC

== Dukwana premiership: 2023–2024 ==
On 14 March 2023, Dukwana appointed his Executive Council.

Free State Executive Council 2023–2024
Post	Member	Term		Party
Premier of the Free State	Mxolisi Dukwana	2023	2024	ANC
MEC for Finance	Gadija Brown	2023	2024	ANC
MEC for Health	Mathabo Leeto	2023	2024	ANC
MEC for Education	Makalo Mohale	2023	2024	ANC
MEC for Agriculture and Rural Development	Saki Mokoena	2023	2024	ANC
MEC for Economic, Small Business Development, Tourism and Environmental Affairs	Thabo Meeko	2023	2024	ANC
MEC for Police, Roads and Transport	Maqueen Letsoha-Mathae	2023	2024	ANC
MEC for Public Works and Human Settlements	Dibolelo Mahlatsi	2023	2024	ANC
MEC for Cooperative Governance and Traditional Affairs	Ketso Makume	2023	2024	ANC
MEC for Social Development	Motshidisi Koloi	2023	2024	ANC
MEC for Sports, Arts, Culture and Recreation	Limakatso Mahasa	2023	2024	ANC

== Lesotha-Mathae premiership: 2024–present ==
Following the 2024 provincial election, Dukwana was replaced as premier with Maqueen Letsoha-Mathae. She announced her executive council on 20 June 2024.

Free State Executive Council 2024–present
Post	Member	Term		Party
Premier of the Free State	Maqueen Letsoha-Mathae	2024	Incumbent	ANC
MEC for Finance, Tourism and Economic Development	Ketso Makume	2024	Incumbent	ANC
MEC for Public Works and Infrastructure	Mathabo Leeto	2024	Incumbent	ANC
MEC for Social Development	Mathabo Leeto	2024	Incumbent	ANC
MEC for Education	Mantlhake Maboya	2024	Incumbent	ANC
MEC for Health	Monyatso Mahlatsi	2024	Incumbent	ANC
MEC for Agriculture, Rural Development and Environmental Affairs	Elzabe Rockman	2024	Incumbent	ANC
MEC for Community Safety, Roads and Transport	Jabu Mbalula	2024	Incumbent	ANC
MEC for Cooperative Governance and Traditional Affairs and Human Settlements	Saki Mokoena	2024	Incumbent	ANC
MEC for Sports, Arts, Culture and Recreation	Zanele Sifuba	2024	Incumbent	ANC

== See also ==
- Template: Free State Executive Council
- Government of South Africa
- Constitution of South Africa
- Orange Free State
