= Sakhiwo Belot =

South African politician

Member of the Free State Executive Council for Health
- In office May 2004 – May 2009
- Premier: Beatrice Marshoff
- Preceded by: Mantsheng Tsopo
- Succeeded by: Sisi Mabe

Member of the Free State Executive Council for Tourism and Environmental and Economic Affairs
- In office June 2001 – May 2004
- Premier: Winkie Direko
- Preceded by: Benny Kotsoane
- Succeeded by: Benny Malakoane

Personal details
- Born: 27 November 1953 (age 72)
- Citizenship: South Africa
- Party: African National Congress

Sakhiwo Tobias Belot (born 27 November 1953) is a South African politician who represented the African National Congress (ANC) in the National Assembly and Free State Provincial Legislature until 2009. He also served in the Free State Executive Council, most proximately as the Free State's Member of the Executive Council (MEC) for Health from 2004 to 2009 and MEC for Tourism and Environmental and Economic Affairs from 2001 to 2004.

== Legislative career: 1994–2009 ==
Belot was born on 27 November 1953. After South Africa's first post-apartheid elections in 1994, he was elected to an ANC seat in the Free State Provincial Legislature, where he served as the province's MEC for Education. However, he left during the legislative term in order to take up a seat in the National Assembly. He was elected to a full term in the National Assembly in the 1999 general election.

In 2001, Belot again changed seats during the legislative term: he resigned from the National Assembly on 28 June, and later the same day it was announced that he would return to the Free State to serve as MEC for Tourism and Environmental and Economic Affairs in Premier Winkie Direko's newly reshuffled Executive Council. He traded seats with Sisi Ntombela, who vacated the Free State Provincial Legislature to fill Belot's seat in the National Assembly. It was reported that Belot had an extremely poor relationship with the head of his department, Noby Ngombane.

Belot was elected to a full term in the provincial legislature in the 2004 general election, and Direko's successor, Beatrice Marshoff, appointed him as MEC for Health. While in that position, in November 2006, he was hospitalised after a car accident. In May 2007, he served as acting Premier of the Free State when Marshoff was briefly hospitalised. He remained in the health portfolio until the 2009 general election, in which he was not re-elected to the provincial legislature; he was succeeded as MEC by Sisi Mabe.

== Personal life ==
He has three sons.
