= Casca Mokitlane =

South African politician (born 1951)

Member of the Free State Provincial Legislature
- In office 1999–2014

Member of the Free State Executive Council for Education
- In office August 2007 – February 2009
- Premier: Beatrice Marshoff
- Preceded by: Mantsheng Tsopo
- Succeeded by: Tate Makgoe

Member of the Free State Executive Council for Agriculture
- In office April 2005 – August 2007
- Premier: Beatrice Marshoff
- Preceded by: Ace Magashule
- Succeeded by: Susan Mnumzana

Deputy Provincial Chairperson of the Free State African National Congress
- In office 1998–2005
- Chairperson: Ace Magashule
- Preceded by: Benny Kotsoane
- Succeeded by: Pat Matosa

Personal details
- Born: Modise Casalis Mokitlane; 17 September 1951 (age 74) Vredefort, Orange Free State; Union of South Africa
- Party: African National Congress; Congress of the People (from 2009 to 2014)

Modise Casalis "Casca" Mokitlane (born 17 September 1951) is a former politician and diplomat from South Africa who served in the Free State Provincial Legislature from 1999 until 2014. He is a former Deputy Provincial Chairperson of the African National Congress (ANC) and is known for his short-lived defection to the opposition Congress of the People (COPE) between 2009 and 2014.

Mokitlane represented the ANC in the National Assembly between 1994 and 1995 and in the Free State Provincial Legislature from 1999. In the latter capacity, he served in three different portfolios in the Free State Executive Council: under Premier Winkie Direko, as Member of the Executive Council (MEC) for Safety and Security from 1999 to 2001; and, under Premier Beatrice Marshoff, as MEC for Agriculture from 2005 to 2007 and MEC for Education from 2007 to 2009. He was also Majority Chief Whip in the provincial legislature between 2004 and 2005. Simultaneously, Mokitlane served two terms as ANC Deputy Provincial Chairperson in the Free State from 1998 to 2005; he deputised longstanding Provincial Chairperson Ace Magashule, with whom he was believed to have an unhappy relationship, and he lost the deputy chair in 2005 after attempting to unseat Magashule.

In February 2009, Mokitlane announced that he had resigned from the provincial government and from the ANC in order to join COPE, a new breakaway party. He became COPE's candidate for election as Premier of the Free State in the 2009 general election. Pursuant to the election, between 2009 and 2014, he led the COPE caucus as the official Leader of the Opposition in the Free State Provincial Legislature. However, weeks before the 2014 general election, he resigned from COPE and rejoined the ANC. Thereafter Mokitlane retreated from frontline politics and, following a four-year tour as South Africa's High Commissioner to Singapore, he retired in 2021.

== Early life and education ==
Mokitlane was born on 17 September 1951 in Vredefort in the former Orange Free State. As a young adult, he enrolled at the University of the North, where, in 1974, he joined the South African Students' Organisation, a national anti-apartheid organisation aligned to the Black Consciousness Movement.

In 1975, he abandoned his studies and worked a stint as a site clerk. The following year, he entered the Tshiya College of Education in Qwaqwa, where he trained to become a teacher. In later decades, he obtained a diploma in computer programming from the University of Zululand in 1986 and a postgraduate diploma in management from the University of the Witwatersrand in 2015.

== Post-apartheid career ==
After the end of apartheid, from 1994 to 1995, Mokitlane represented the governing African National Congress (ANC) in the National Assembly, the lower house of the new South African Parliament. In 1998, he was elected Deputy Provincial Chairperson of the ANC's branch in the newly constituted Free State province; he served under Provincial Chairperson Ace Magashule.

The following year, after the 1999 general election, Mokitlane was elected to represent the ANC in the Free State Provincial Legislature. The third Premier of the Free State, Winkie Direko, appointed Mokitlane to the Free State Executive Council as Member of the Executive Council (MEC) for Safety and Security. However, in a cabinet reshuffle on 28 June 2001, Mokitlane was fired from the Executive Council and replaced by Benny Kotsoane; his sacking confirmed reports, published earlier that year, that Direko was planning to replace him. However, he served the remainder of the legislative term as an ordinary Member of the Provincial Legislature, and he was re-elected as ANC Deputy Provincial Chairperson in 2002.

In late 2003, Mokitlane performed well in internal ANC processes to select candidates for the 2004 general election: he received the highest number of nominations from party branches in the province. He was re-elected to his legislative seat in 2004 and served as Chief Whip of the Majority Party in the provincial legislature from 2004 to 2005. In early April 2005, he returned to the Executive Council when Direko's successor, Premier Beatrice Marshoff, appointed him MEC for Agriculture. In that capacity he replaced Ace Magashule – whom he continued to deputise in the ANC – and the Mail & Guardian speculated that the reshuffle was an attempt by Marshoff to "take advantage of divisions within the ANC" and particularly of divisions between Magashule and Mokitlane.

In the weeks following his appointment as Agriculture MEC, Mokitlane campaigned to succeed Magashule as ANC Provincial Chairperson. However, when the party's provincial conference was held on 25 June 2005 in Bloemfontein, Magashule won re-election; Mokitlane was succeeded as Deputy Provincial Chairperson by Pat Matosa and did not secure election to any of the other top leadership positions. He continued as MEC for Agriculture until August 2007, when, in another reshuffle, he was appointed MEC for Education. While he was in that role, and as another party election approached, Mokitlane was reportedly again viewed as a possible candidate to challenge Magashule; however, at the party conference in July 2008, Magashule was re-elected unopposed to a fourth term as Provincial Chairperson.

=== Defection to COPE: 2009–2014 ===
On 5 February 2009, Mokitlane announced that he had left the ANC to join the Congress of the People (COPE), a newly established breakaway party founded by supporters of former President Thabo Mbeki. Mokitlane said that he had contacted COPE because of his disillusionment with the ANC and its record in the province, including its abuse of cadre deployment:

"There are many reasons for my move, but one of the main reasons is the rampant patronage which is very prevalent in the Free State. The administrative processes, which are not up to scratch in a number of municipalities, are due to the deployment of people by the leadership in position they do not have capacity for... In the confines of the ANC, where internal democracy has actually collapsed, I could no longer find any way of ensuring that the principles of democracy could be upheld..."

Mokitlane resigned from the Executive Council, from the provincial legislature, and from the ANC; Mxolisi Dukwana took on his education portfolio in an acting capacity. Following a candidate selection process led by COPE's Barney Pityana, Mokitlane became COPE's official candidate for election as Premier of the Free State in the upcoming April 2009 general election. He was therefore listed first on COPE's party list in the provincial election, in which COPE won four seats; although he was not elected Premier, he became the Leader of the Official Opposition in the provincial legislature.

=== Return to the ANC: 2014 ===
In early April 2014, Mokitlane announced that he had left COPE to rejoin the ANC because he no longer believed that COPE presented "a credible alternative in government". He criticised COPE's leader, Mosiuoa Lekota, as obsessed with power and said, "That project [COPE] has failed. It has reached a cul de sac. I no longer want to be associated with a dying organisation. Cope under Lekota is history". Upon his return, Mokitlane denied having criticised Magashule's leadership in the past, arguing that Magashule "was at the forefront of bringing me back to the ANC". Mokitlane did not stand for re-election to the provincial legislature in the May 2014 general election.

== Diplomatic post and retirement ==
In 2017, President Jacob Zuma appointed Mokitlane as South Africa's High Commissioner to Singapore. He presented his credentials on 29 November 2017 and served at the High Commission for four years before returning to South Africa, where he retired in Parys in the Free State.
