= Mamiki Qabathe =

South African politician

Member of the Free State Executive Council for Social Development
- In office 28 May 2019 – 14 March 2023
- Premier: Sisi Ntombela
- Preceded by: Butana Komphela
- Succeeded by: Motshidisi Koloi

Speaker of the Free State Provincial Legislature
- In office March 2015 – May 2019
- Premier: Ace Magashule
- Preceded by: Sisi Mabe
- Succeeded by: Zanele Sifuba

Member of the Free State Executive Council for Agriculture
- In office May 2013 – March 2015 (for Agriculture and Rural Development)
- Premier: Ace Magashule
- Preceded by: Msebenzi Zwane
- Succeeded by: Msebenzi Zwane
- In office May 2009 – February 2011
- Premier: Ace Magashule
- Preceded by: Neo Masithela
- Succeeded by: Msebenzi Zwane
- In office January 2008 – October 2008
- Preceded by: Susan Mnumzana
- Succeeded by: Neo Masithela

Member of the Free State Executive Council for Economic Development, Tourism and Environmental Affairs
- In office February 2012 – March 2013
- Premier: Ace Magashule
- Preceded by: Mxolisi Dukwana
- Succeeded by: Msebenzi Zwane

Deputy Provincial Secretary of the African National Congress in the Free State
- In office July 2008 – March 2021
- Secretary: Sibongile Besani; William Bulwane; Paseko Nompondo
- Chairperson: Ace Magashule; Sam Mashinini
- Preceded by: Sibongile Besani

Personal details
- Born: Hennenman, Orange Free State; South Africa
- Party: African National Congress
- Education: Vista University

Motlagomang Grazy "Mamiki" Qabathe is a South African politician from the Free State. She represented the African National Congress (ANC) in the Free State Provincial Legislature between January 2008 and May 2024. During that time she served in the Executive Council of the Free State continuously between 2008 and 2023, excepting a term as Speaker of the Free State Provincial Legislature from 2015 to 2019.

Qabathe began her political career as an activist in the South African Municipal Workers' Union and as the first Executive Mayor of Lejweleputswa District Municipality. She was first appointed to the Free State Executive Council in January 2008 under Premier Beatrice Marshoff and she retained her seat throughout the first term of Premier Ace Magashule. She served in several portfolios, most prominently as Member of the Executive Council (MEC) for Agriculture. She also served under Magashule as Deputy Provincial Secretary of the ANC's Free State branch from 2008 to 2021.

After her four years as speaker from 2015 to 2019, Qabathe returned to the Executive Council as MEC for Social Development from May 2019 to March 2023. She was sacked by Premier Mxolisi Dukwana in March 2023 and left the provincial legislature in the May 2024 general election.

== Early life and career ==
Qabathe was born in Hennenman and grew up in Meloding, a township outside Virginia in the present-day Free State province (then the Orange Free State). She became active in anti-apartheid youth politics in 1986 while a student at Vista University in Bloemfontein, where she joined the Azanian Students' Organisation. In 1987 she began work at the Meloding Town Council and the following year she was recruited to the South African Municipal Workers' Union (SAMWU), an affiliate of the Congress of South African Trade Unions (COSATU). Over the next few years, she rose through the ranks of SAMWU, from the local shop stewards' council to the positions of national provincial treasurer and national second deputy president.

She was also active in the regional branch of COSATU and after the end of apartheid in 1994 she became active in local structures of the African National Congress (ANC) and ANC Women's League. When the Lejweleputswa District Municipality was established in 2000, she represented the ANC as the district's inaugural Executive Mayor.

== Provincial legislature ==
=== Marshoff premiership: 2008–2009 ===
In January 2008, Qabathe was appointed to the Free State Executive Council by Beatrice Marshoff, then the Premier of the Free State. She became Member of the Executive Council (MEC) for Agriculture. In July of that year, she ascended for the first time to one of the so-called "Top Five" offices in the ANC's Free State branch; she was elected unopposed as Deputy Provincial Secretary of the Free State ANC, serving under Ace Magashule, as Provincial Chairperson, and Sibongile Besani, as Provincial Secretary. In October, Marshoff announced a reshuffle in which Qabathe became MEC for Sports, Arts and Culture; she remained in that portfolio for the rest of Marshoff's term in office.

=== Magashule premiership: 2009–2018 ===
==== Executive Council portfolios ====
Pursuant to the 2009 general election, Marshoff was succeeded as Premier by Ace Magashule. In Magashule's new Executive Council, Qabathe was returned to her old post as MEC for Agriculture. Over the next four years, Qabathe moved across several portfolios in Magashule's frequent reshuffles. She was moved to the cooperative governance, traditional affairs and human settlements portfolio in February 2011; then to the economic development, tourism and environmental affairs portfolio in February 2012; and finally back to the agriculture portfolio (which by then also included rural development) in March 2013. In the 2014 general election, Qabathe was re-elected to her seat in the Free State Provincial Legislature, ranked eighth on the ANC's party list. Magashule, who was also re-elected, retained her as MEC for Agriculture and Rural Development.

==== Speaker of the Free State Legislature ====
On 11 March 2015, she was elected Speaker of the Free State Provincial Legislature and therefore departed the Executive Council; she succeeded Sisi Mabe, who had died in 2014, and Msebenzi Zwane succeeded her as Agriculture MEC in May.

==== Vrede Dairy Project ====
Qabathe's tenure as MEC under Magashule later attracted controversy because of her involvement in implementing the Vrede Dairy Project, which was established in 2012 but continued during Qabathe's third term as agriculture MEC from 2013 to 2015. The project was later investigated by the Public Protector, Busisiwe Mkhwebane, who concluded in 2020 that Qabathe – along with Magashule and Msebenzi Zwane, who both preceded and succeeded her in the agriculture portfolio – was guilty of maladministration and misconduct in so far as she had failed to fulfil her constitutional oversight duties in respect of the project.

Mkhwebane recommended that the Free State government should consider sanctioning Qabathe for her role in the Vrede Dairy Project saga. The opposition Economic Freedom Fighters called for Qabathe to be fired, and the opposition Democratic Alliance (DA) asked the Special Investigating Unit to investigate her and other officials for their role. The DA claimed that, in addition to her putative failures as an MEC, Qabathe had shielded Zwane from accountability while she was Speaker of the legislature.

==== Re-election as ANC Deputy Secretary ====
Qabathe was re-elected to her party office as ANC Deputy Provincial Secretary in May 2013 and December 2017, still under Provincial Chairperson Magashule. Shortly after her 2017 re-election, the election results were nullified by the high court due to procedural irregularities, but Qabathe was subsequently appointed as a member of the interim task team assembled by the national ANC to lead the provincial party until fresh elections could be held.

=== Ntombela premiership: 2018–2023 ===
When the ANC elections were re-run in May 2018, Qabathe was elected unopposed as Deputy Provincial Secretary, now serving under Sam Mashinini, who succeeded Magashule as chairperson, and Provincial Secretary Paseka Nompondo. In the 2019 general election, she was ranked second on the ANC's party list and was re-elected to the provincial legislature. Instead of seeking re-election as Speaker, she was returned to the Executive Council, where Sisi Ntombela, Magashule's successor as Premier, appointed her MEC for Social Development. Her term as ANC Deputy Secretary ended in 2021 when the national ANC disbanded the provincial leadership corps.

=== Dukwana premiership: 2023–2024 ===
In March 2023, Qabathe was sacked from the Executive Council of Mxolisi Dukwana, who succeeded Ntombela as Premier following Ntombela's resignation the previous month. Qabathe served as a backbencher in the provincial legislature until the May 2024 general election, when she gave up her seat.

== Personal life ==
She is married and has three children.
