= Joel Mafereka =

South African businessman and politician (1951–2013)

Member of the Free State Executive Council for Local Government and Housing
- In office April 2005 – April 2009
- Premier: Beatrice Marshoff
- Preceded by: Benny Kotsoane
- Succeeded by: Mosebenzi Zwane (for Cooperative Governance, Traditional Affairs and Human Settlements)

Member of the Free State Executive Council for Sports, Arts, Culture, Science and Technology
- In office May 2004 – April 2005
- Premier: Beatrice Marshoff
- Preceded by: Webster Mfebe
- Succeeded by: Susan Mnumzana

Personal details
- Born: Malefetsane Joel Mafereka; 5 November 1951
- Died: 11 November 2013 (aged 62) Johannesburg, Gauteng; South Africa
- Citizenship: South Africa
- Party: African National Congress

Malefetsane Joel Mafereka (5 November 1951 – 11 November 2013), also known as Joe Mafereka, was a South African politician and businessman who represented the African National Congress (ANC) in the Free State Provincial Legislature from 1994 to 2009. He served as the Free State's Member of the Executive Council (MEC) for Sports, Arts, Culture, Science and Technology from 2004 to 2005 and as MEC for Local Government and Housing from 2005 to 2009.

A former taxi-industry boss, Mafereka was charged with murder in November 2000, while he was serving as Speaker of the Free State Provincial Legislature. The charges emanated from a 1989 death which prosecutors linked to taxi violence. Mafereka was acquitted of all charges in 2002 and Premier Beatrice Marshoff appointed him to the Free State Executive Council at the beginning of the next legislative term. After failing to gain re-election to the legislature in the 2009 general election, Mafereka chaired the North West arm of the Commission on Traditional Leadership Disputes and Claims until his illness and death in 2013.

== Early life and career ==
Mafereka was born on 5 November 1951. During apartheid, he was a businessman in the minibus taxi industry of the Free State Goldfields. He was a member of the Majakathata taxi association (later merged into the Mahanu-Puso taxi association), based in Welkom, Free State. He was also active in the Thabong Civic Association, which participated in the Mass Democratic Movement of the late 1980s.

== Political career ==
He was elected to the Free State Provincial Legislature as an ANC representative in 1994 and he was elected Speaker in 1998, succeeding Motlalepule Chabaku. He continued in the Speaker's office after the 1999 general election, in which he was elected to a second term in the provincial legislature. He retained some business interests and, as of late 2000, he remained a member of the Mahanu-Puso taxi association and owned a single taxi.

=== Murder trial: 2000–2002 ===
On 18 November 2000, Mafereka was arrested by the Special Investigation Unit at Johannesburg International Airport shortly after returning from a trip to Cuba. The police said that his arrest – and the arrest of six other men, including four taxi drivers and Mafereka's bodyguard and personal driver – was related to violent competition between rival taxi associations in Welkom and nearby Wepener in the late 1980s. Mafereka was detained for four days in Pretoria before securing release on R10,000 bail.

Prosecutors said that Mafereka faced a murder charge in connection with the murder of Joseph Qesi, a taxi driver who had been found stoned to death in Jammersdrift near Wepener in October 1989. According to the state, witnesses were prepared to testify that Mafereka had ordered Qesi's murder. During the bail hearings, they said that Mafereka was also investigation for other criminal complaints, including bribing police officers and witness intimidation. Mafereka denied wrongdoing and said that the allegations were an attempt to damage his reputation and that of the ANC.

The state ultimately pursued charges of murder and malicious property damage against Mafereka and his co-accused, who were trialled in the Free State High Court. In early May 2002, the court acquitted Mafereka on all charges, judging that the National Prosecuting Authority had failed to prove his guilt beyond reasonable doubt.

=== Free State Executive Council: 2004–2009 ===
In the week after his arrest in November 2000, Mafereka had been suspended as the Speaker of the provincial legislature and as a member of the ANC, pending the outcome of the trial. By the time of his acquittal in May 2002, he had been replaced as Speaker.

However, he was re-elected to the provincial legislature in the 2004 general election, and in the aftermath of the election he was appointed to the Free State Executive Council by Beatrice Marshoff, the newly elected Premier of the Free State. Marshoff named him as Member of the Executive Council (MEC) for Sports, Arts, Culture, Science and Technology. He remained in that position until April 2005, when, in a cabinet reshuffle, he replaced Benny Kotsoane as MEC for Local Government and Housing. He retained that position for the remainder of the legislative term but was not re-elected to the provincial legislature in the 2009 general election.

== Later career and death ==
In 2011, Mafereka was appointed to chair the North West arm of the Commission on Traditional Leadership Disputes and Claims. He remained in that position until his death on 11 November 2013. Aged 62, he died in hospital in Johannesburg after spending three weeks in a coma.
