= Seiso Mohai =

South African politician (born 1966)

The Honourable Seiso Mohai MP

Deputy Minister of Planning, Monitoring and Evaluation
- Incumbent
- Assumed office 3 July 2024
- President: Cyril Ramaphosa
- Minister: Maropene Ramokgopa

Majority Chief Whip in the National Council of Provinces
- In office 22 May 2014 – 28 May 2024

Member of the Free State Executive Council for Finance
- In office 11 May 2009 – 11 March 2013
- Premier: Ace Magashule
- Preceded by: Tate Makgoe
- Succeeded by: Elzabe Rockman

Member of the Free State Executive Council for Public Works, Roads and Transport
- In office 3 May 2004 – 11 May 2009
- Premier: Beatrice Marshoff
- Preceded by: Sekhopi Malebo
- Succeeded by: Thabo Manyoni (for Roads and Transport); Fezi Ngubentombi (for Public Works)

Personal details
- Born: 8 November 1966 (age 59)
- Citizenship: South Africa
- Party: African National Congress

Seiso Joel Mohai (born 8 November 1966) is a South African politician from the Free State. A member of the African National Congress, he has been the Deputy Minister of Planning, Monitoring and Evaluation since 3 July 2024. Before that, he was the Chief Whip of the Majority Party in the National Council of Provinces (NCOP) between 2014 and 2024.

Before joining the NCOP in the 2014 general election, Mohai served stints in both the National Assembly and the Free State Provincial Legislature, and he was a Member of the Free State Executive Council from 2004 to 2013.

== Early life and activism ==
Mohai was born on 8 November 1966. In the early 1980s, he attended secondary school in Botshabelo, a township outside Bloemfontein in the Orange Free State. While a student, he became active in anti-apartheid politics, including through the Congress of South African Students and South African Youth Congress. He also helped establish the Garment and Allied Workers' Union among textiles workers in the region.

After the African National Congress (ANC) was unbanned in 1990, he was recruited to the leadership of the ANC Youth League in the Southern Free State region around Botshabelo. He was elected to the Youth League's National Executive Committee in 1998.

== Career in government ==
In the 1999 general election, Mohai was elected to an ANC seat in the National Assembly, representing the Free State constituency, but he left midway through the legislative term on 28 June 2001; his seat was filled by Butana Komphela.

Thereafter he returned to the Free State to serve as ANC Chief Whip in the Free State Provincial Legislature. He held the whip until the 2004 general election, after which he was appointed to the Free State Executive Council by Beatrice Marshoff, the newly elected Premier of the Free State; Marshoff made him Member of the Executive Council (MEC) for Public Works, Roads and Transport. After the next general election in 2009, he was appointed MEC for Finance by Marshoff's successor, Premier Ace Magashule. However, in March 2013, Magashule fired Mohai from the Executive Council, replacing him with Elzabe Rockman. He said that Mohai was a "very strong leader" and that the ANC had decided to "redeploy" him to the national Parliament.

Mohai rejoined the National Assembly on 26 March 2013, filling a casual vacancy. He served in that seat until the 2014 general election, when he was elected to the National Council of Provinces (NCOP), the upper house of the Parliament, and appointed the ANC's Chief Whip in the NCOP. He was re-elected both to his NCOP seat and to the whip's office after the 2019 general election. In January 2023, he was one of three candidates nominated by the ANC for election as Mayor of Mangaung.
