= Fezi Ngubentombi =

South African politician

Member of the Free State Executive Council for Health
- In office February 2011 – 1 December 2012
- Premier: Ace Magashule
- Preceded by: Sisi Mabe
- Succeeded by: Benny Malakoane

Member of the Free State Executive Council for Public Works and Rural Development
- In office May 2009 – February 2011
- Premier: Ace Magashule
- Preceded by: Seiso Mohai (for Public Works, Roads and Transport)
- Succeeded by: Sisi Mabe (for Public Works); Msebenzi Zwane (for Agriculture and Rural Development)

Member of the Free State Provincial Legislature
- In office May 2009 – 1 December 2012

Personal details
- Born: 1965 Qumbu, Cape Province; South Africa
- Died: 1 December 2012 (aged 47)
- Party: African National Congress

Fundiswa "Fezi" Ngubentombi (1965 – 1 December 2012) was a South African politician who represented the African National Congress (ANC) in the Free State Provincial Legislature from 2009 until her death in 2012. During that time, she served as the Free State's Member of the Executive Council (MEC) for Public Works and Rural Development from 2009 to 2011 and then as MEC for Health from 2011 to 2012. A former teacher, she also served as Mayor of Metsimaholo Local Municipality from 2006 to 2009.

Ngubentombi died in a car accident in December 2012. At the time of her death, she was a member of the Provincial Executive Committee of the Free State ANC and a member of the National Executive Committee of the ANC Women's League.

== Early life and career ==
Ngubentombi was born in 1965 in Qumbu in the former Cape Province. She matriculated in Qumbu before moving to the present-day Free State province to work as a teacher in Parys and Sasolburg. From 2003 to 2006, she represented the ANC as a ward councillor in the Free State, and she served as Executive Mayor of Metsimaholo Local Municipality from 2006 to 2009.

Towards the end of her term as mayor, in 2008, she was additionally elected to the Provincial Executive Committee of the ANC's Free State branch. She was also a member of the National Executive Committee of the ANC Women's League.

== Career in provincial government ==
In the 2009 general election, Ngubentombi was elected to the Free State Provincial Legislature, ranked 14th on the ANC's provincial party list. She was also appointed to the Free State Executive Council: on 11 May 2009, newly elected Premier Ace Magashule appointed her as MEC for Public Works and Rural Development in his first-term cabinet. Ngubentombi remained in that portfolio until February 2011, when Magashule announced a reshuffle which saw her become MEC for Health.

== Personal life and death ==
Ngubentombi died on 1 December 2012 in a car accident on the N1 outside Bloemfontein. She had been on her way back from a political event in QwaQwa when the car she was travelling in crashed into an overhead bridge and caught fire. One of her police bodyguards, Sergeant Bena Motaung, was also killed, and two passengers were injured.

Her funeral service was held at Zamdela Stadium in Sasolburg and included speeches by Premier Magashule, national Health Minister Aaron Motsoaledi, and ANC Women's League President Angie Motshekga. A public hospital in Sasolburg was later named after Ngumbentombi.

She was married to Zandisile Churchill Ngubentombi and had five children.
