= Oupa Khoabane =

South African politician

Member of the Free State Provincial Legislature
- In office 21 May 2014 – 7 May 2019

Member of the Free State Executive Council for Cooperative Governance and Traditional Affairs
- In office 9 May 2018 – 7 May 2019
- Premier: Sisi Ntombela
- Preceded by: Sisi Ntombela (for Cooperative Governance, Traditional Affairs and Human Settlements)
- Succeeded by: Thembeni Nxangisa

Member of the Free State Executive Council for Agriculture and Rural Development
- In office September 2015 – 9 May 2018
- Premier: Ace Magashule; Sisi Ntombela
- Preceded by: Msebenzi Zwane
- Succeeded by: Benny Malakoane

Personal details
- Citizenship: South Africa
- Party: African National Congress

Motete Daniel "Oupa" Khoabane is a South African politician who represented the African National Congress (ANC) in the Free State Provincial Legislature from 2014 to 2019. During that time, he served as the Free State's Member of the Executive Council (MEC) for Agriculture and Rural Development from 2015 to 2018 and as MEC for Cooperative Governance and Traditional Affairs from 2018 to 2019. He failed to gain re-election to the provincial legislature in the 2019 general election.

== Political career ==
Khoabane served a single term in the provincial legislature after gaining election in the 2014 general election; he was ranked seventh on the ANC's provincial party list. Just over a year after the election, he was appointed to the Free State Executive Council by Premier Ace Magashule, who named him as MEC for Agriculture and Rural Development. In that office he succeeded Msebenzi Zwane, who had resigned to join the National Assembly and national Cabinet.

He remained in the Agriculture and Rural Development portfolio until 9 May 2018, when Magashule's successor, Premier Sisi Ntombela, announced a reshuffle which saw him appointed as MEC for Cooperative Governance and Traditional Affairs. A year later, in the 2019 general election, Khoabane left the provincial legislature, and therefore the Executive Council, after failing to gain re-election; he was ranked 27th on the ANC's provincial party list in the election and lost his legislative seat.

In May 2015, the national leadership of the ANC appointed an interim provincial committee to lead the Free State ANC after the elected provincial leadership corps, headed by Sam Mashinini, was declared unlawful in court. Khoabane was appointed as a member of the interim committee and went on to serve as its spokesperson.
