= Neo Masithela =

South African politician (born 1966)

Member of the Free State Executive Council for Agriculture
- In office October 2008 – May 2009
- Premier: Beatrice Marshoff
- Preceded by: Mamiki Qabathe
- Succeeded by: Mamiki Qabathe

Member of the Free State Executive Council for Tourism, Environment and Economic Affairs
- In office May 2005 – October 2008
- Premier: Beatrice Marshoff
- Preceded by: Benny Malakoane
- Succeeded by: Mxolisi Dukwana

Member of the National Assembly
- In office June 1999 – 18 May 2005

Personal details
- Born: Neo Harrison Masithela; 20 March 1966 (age 60)
- Citizenship: South Africa
- Party: African National Congress

Neo Harrison Masithela (born 20 March 1966) is a South African politician and businessman who served in the Executive Council of the Free State from 2005 to 2009. Before that, he represented the African National Congress (ANC) in the National Assembly from 1999 to 2005. As of 2022, he was the chairperson of the African Farmers Association of South Africa.

== Legislative career: 1999–2009 ==
Masithela was elected to the National Assembly in the 1999 general election. He stood as a candidate on the ANC's national party list in his capacity as a member of the executive of the ANC Youth League's North West branch. In the next general election in 2004, he was re-elected to a second term, on that occasion as a member of the ANC's Free State caucus.

On 18 May 2005, Masithela resigned from his seat in order to join the Free State Provincial Legislature, where he was appointed by Premier Beatrice Marshoff as Member of the Executive Council (MEC) for Tourism, Environment and Economic Affairs; he succeeded Benny Malakoane, whom Marshoff had sacked in April. He remained in that portfolio until October 2008, when, in a reshuffle, he was moved to replace Mamiki Qabathe as MEC for Agriculture. He left the provincial legislature and Executive Council after the 2009 general election.
