= Dlungwana =

Dlungwana is a South African surname that may refer to

- Mthandeni Dlungwana (born 1976), South African politician
- Tyson Dlungwana (born 1997), South African field hockey
- Zanele Dlungwana (born 1952), South African politician
