= Mathabo Leeto =

South African politician (born 1960)

Mathabo Leeto MPL

Member of the Free State Executive Council for Social Development
- Incumbent
- Assumed office 23 June 2024
- Premier: Maqueen Letsoha-Mathae
- Preceded by: Motshidisi Koloi

Member of the Free State Executive Council for Health
- In office 14 March 2023 – 14 June 2024
- Premier: Mxolisi Dukwana
- Preceded by: Montseng Tsiu
- Succeeded by: Monyatso Mahlatsi

Member of the Free State Executive Council for Sports, Arts, Culture and Recreation
- In office 29 May 2014 – 7 May 2019
- Premier: Sisi Ntombela; Ace Magashule
- Preceded by: Dan Kgothule
- Succeeded by: Limakatso Mahasa

Provincial Treasurer of the African National Congress
- Incumbent
- Assumed office 22 January 2023
- Preceded by: Sisi Ntombela (2021)

Member of the Free State Provincial Legislature
- Incumbent
- Assumed office 13 March 2023
- In office 21 May 2014 – 7 May 2019

Personal details
- Born: 29 November 1960 (age 65)
- Party: African National Congress

Nokwanje Selina "Mathabo" Leeto (born 29 November 1960) is a South African politician who was elected to the Free State Provincial Legislature in the 2014 general election. She was appointed as the Member of the Executive Council for Sports, Arts, Culture and Recreation. Leeto left the provincial legislature at the 2019 general election. She was elected provincial treasurer of the African National Congress in January 2023 and returned to the Provincial Legislature in March 2023. She was then appointed as the MEC for Health. Following the 2024 general election, Leeto took over as the MEC for Social Development.

== Background ==
Leeto served as a ward councillor for the African National Congress and as a member of the National Executive Committee of the women's league. She was the mayor of the Matjhabeng Local Municipality, before becoming the mayor of the Lejweleputswa District Municipality in 2011. After her swearing-in as district mayor, it was revealed that the municipality spent R640 000 on her inauguration ceremony instead of extending a job-creation programme. In June 2012, Leeto was elected as chairperson of the ANC's Lejweleputswa Region.

== Free State provincial government ==
=== MEC for Sports, Arts, Culture and Recreation: 2014–2019 ===
Leeto was elected to the Free State Provincial Legislature in the 2014 general election as the ANC won 22 seats in the legislature. She was then appointed by premier Ace Magashule to the Executive Council of the Free State as the Member of the Executive Council (MEC) for Sports, Arts, Culture and Recreation, succeeding Dan Kgothule who was not re-elected to the provincial legislature.

She remained as MEC for Sports, Arts, Culture and Recreation following Sisi Ntombela's election as Premier of the Free State. In early-March 2019, Leeto was elected president of the South African National Civic Organisation (Sanco). The following month, Sanco accused Magashule of moving Leeto down the ANC's national party list to prevent her from joining Parliament following the May 8, 2019 general elections. Leeto was not elected to parliament and left the provincial legislature.

=== MEC for Health: 2023–2024 ===
Leeto was sworn in as a Member of the Free State Provincial Legislature on 13 March 2023. The following day, newly elected premier Mxolisi Dukwana announced his Executive Council which saw Leeto replace Montseng Tsiu as MEC for Health.

=== MEC for Social Development: 2024 ===
Following the 2024 provincial election, Dukwana was replaced as premier with Maqueen Letsoha-Mathae. Lesotha-Mathae named Leeto as the new MEC for Social Development.

== In the provincial ANC ==
After Magashule was elected Secretary-General of the African National Congress, a position which required that he must resign as ANC provincial chairperson, in December 2017, Leeto and the MEC for Police‚ Roads and Transport Sam Mashinini were seen as favourites to succeed Magashule as the ANC provincial chairperson in the Free State. Leeto was accused of being a Magashule loyalist, which she has subsequently refuted. Mashinini was elected provincial chairperson at the party's conference in May 2018.

=== Provincial treasurer of the ANC ===
Leeto was elected as the provincial treasurer of the ANC at the party's elective conference in January 2023, defeating staunch Magashule supporter Vusi Tshabalala.

== Controversies ==
=== Tenure as Matjhabeng mayor ===
Leeto and Health MEC Benny Malakoane appeared in the Welkom Regional Court on 1 August 2014 on fraud and corruption charges relating to Malakoane's tenure as Matjhabeng municipal manager while Leeto served as the municipality's mayor; the case was transferred to the Bloemfontein Regional Court. Their trial officially began in November 2015. Leeto was acquitted on more than 200 charges of fraud, corruption, money laundering and accepting bribes dating back to her tenure as Matjhabeng mayor on 4 November 2016 after she wrote to the National Prosecuting Authority requesting them to review all the charges against her.

Leeto and Bloem Water CEO Limakatso Moorosi were arrested by The Hawks for fraud and corruption on 16 February 2018 dating back to her tenure as Matjhabeng mayor. She had allegedly awarded a tender worth millions of rands for the procurement and installation of telephone systems, CCTV cameras, photocopy machines without following the correct tender procedures as stipulated by law and she and Moorosi reportedly received kickbacks; the NPA later withdrew the charges due to the low chances of success.

=== Comments during Women's Day debate ===
During a debate in the legislature on Women's Day in the legislature in August 2018, Leeto was accused of saying that when Dutch navigator Jan van Riebeeck arrived in the Cape was when all the trouble started in South Africa and that all white men are rapists and they should be exhumed from their graves to account. She had earlier been accused of calling the DA leader in the legislature Roy Jankielsohn "a piece of faeces"; she denied this and said that the translator misheard her when she was speaking Sesotho. Afrikaner lobby group AfriForum subsequently called for her dismissal. Leeto denied making the comments and said that she was not a racist person.

== Personal life ==
Leeto is a resident of Odendaalsrus.
