= Komphela =

Komphela is a South African surname. Notable people with the surname include:

- Butana Komphela (1955–2022), South African politician
- Steve Komphela (born 1967), South African soccer player and coach
