= Mantsheng Tsopo =

South African politician (1962–2017)

Member of the National Assembly
- In office 21 May 2014 – 1 October 2014

Member of the Free State Provincial Legislature
- In office May 1994 – May 2014

Member of the Free State Executive Council for Social Development
- In office August 2007 – April 2009
- Premier: Beatrice Marshoff
- Preceded by: Zanele Dlungwana
- Succeeded by: Sisi Ntombela

Member of the Free State Executive Council for Education
- In office May 2004 – August 2007
- Premier: Beatrice Marshoff
- Preceded by: Papi Kganare
- Succeeded by: Casca Mokitlane

Member of the Free State Executive Council for Health
- In office May 1999 – May 2004
- Premier: Winkie Direko
- Succeeded by: Sakhiwo Belot

Personal details
- Born: 1 September 1962 Hennenman, Orange Free State; South Africa
- Died: 1 January 2017 (aged 54) Welkom, Free State; South Africa
- Party: African National Congress
- Nickname: Ouma

Mantsheng Anna "Ouma" Tsopo (1 September 1962 – 1 January 2017) was a South African politician who represented the African National Congress (ANC) in the Free State Provincial Legislature from 1994 to 2014. Between 1994 and 2009, she served almost continuously in the Free State Executive Council and held several different portfolios, including as the Free State's inaugural Member of the Executive Council (MEC) for Local Government and Housing from 1994.

After the 2009 general election, Tsopo left the Executive Council but remained in the provincial legislature, where she served as Deputy Speaker, as acting Speaker, and then, from June 2013, as Speaker. In the 2014 general election, she was elected to a seat in the National Assembly, but she resigned from Parliament several months later in October 2014. She was a teacher by profession and a regional leader in the ANC Women's League.

== Early life and career ==
Tsopo was born on 1 September 1962 in Hennenman in the former Orange Free State. She grew up in Theunissen and matriculated at Lebogang Secondary School in Welkom in 1978. After earning a diploma in pedagogics from the University of the North, she worked as a teacher at Naledi High School. She returned to Theunissen in 1988 to work as an administrator at the Masilo Town Council, where she remained until 1993. During the same period, she was active in the African National Congress (ANC), and in 1992 she was appointed as the regional secretary of the Northern Free State branch of the ANC Women's League. In 1993, she took up work full-time at the ANC's Northern Free State headquarters in Welkom.

In addition to her pedagogical diploma, Tsopo later – while serving as an ANC representative – completed a bachelor's degree in management and leadership and a master's degree in public administration, both from the University of the Free State.

== Political career ==
=== Provincial government (1994–2014) ===
In South Africa's first democratic elections in 1994, Tsopo was elected to the inaugural Free State Provincial Legislature. She was also appointed to the Free State Executive Council by Premier Mosuioa Lekota, who named her the province's first Member of the Executive Council (MEC) for Local Government and Housing. She served in that position until 1996 and then as MEC for Sports, Arts and Culture from 1995 to 1996. In 1997, she was reappointed to the Executive Council as MEC for Social Welfare, a position which she held until the end of the legislative term in 1999; simultaneously, she served as Leader of Government Business in the legislature from 1997 to 1999.

She was re-elected to her legislative seat in the 1999 general election and served as MEC for Health under Premier Winkie Direko from 1999 to 2004. Her term in the health portfolio coincided with the peak of the HIV/AIDS epidemic in South Africa and the Sunday Times later admired the speed with which she had rolled out mother-to-child transmission prevention programmes in public health facilities.

Pursuant to the 2004 general election, Tsopo was elected to her third term in the provincial legislature and was re-appointed to the Executive Council by Premier Beatrice Marshoff, who appointed her as MEC for Education. While she was in that position, her husband, Sandile, was prosecuted for defrauding her department, the Free State Department of Education. The fraud concerned a large contract for the distribution of school books over a three-year period from 2001 to 2004, when Tsopo had been MEC for Health. Sandile and two others were convicted of defrauding the Department of Education of more than R360,000. In January 2007, the Bloemfontein Regional Court sentenced him to serve four years' imprisonment. He was denied leave to appeal. Tsopo denied having knowledge of fraud.

During the same period, Tsopo was co-opted onto the National Executive Committee of the ANC; her term on the committee ended in 2007. In August 2007, she vacated the education portfolio to become MEC for Social Development in a reshuffle by Marshoff.

In the next general election in 2009, Tsopo was re-elected to the provincial legislature, ranked 12th on the ANC's provincial party list, but she was not appointed to the Executive Council of Marshoff's successor, Premier Ace Magashule. Instead she became Deputy Speaker of the Free State Provincial Legislature. She served as acting Speaker from 2012 until June 2013, when she was formally elected as Speaker. She held that position until the end of the legislative term in May 2014.

=== National government (2014) ===
In the 2014 general election, Tsopo did not stand for re-election to a fifth term in the provincial legislature, but instead was nominated for election to an ANC seat in the National Assembly, the lower house of the South African Parliament. She was ranked 116th on the ANC's national party list and secured a seat. In Parliament, she served as the ANC's committee whip in the Portfolio Committee on Trade and Industry.

She resigned from Parliament on 1 October 2014. At the time of her death in 2017, she was a student of Ph.D. in governance and political transformation at North-West University.

== Personal life and death ==
Tsopo suffered from diabetes and was admitted to hospital in Welkom on Christmas Eve in 2016. She died in hospital in the early hours of 1 January 2017. The President of South Africa, Jacob Zuma, granted her a provincial official state funeral, held in Meloding in Virginia, Free State.

She was married to Sandile Tsopo and had four children, one of whom, Thabang, predeceased her.
