= Dibolelo Mance =

South African politician from the Free State

Dibolelo Mance MPL

Member of the Free State Executive Council for Public Works and Infrastructure
- Incumbent
- Assumed office 14 March 2023
- Premier: Maqueen Letsoha-Mathae; Mxolisi Dukwana
- Preceded by: Motshidisi Koloi

Member of the Free State Provincial Legislature
- Incumbent
- Assumed office 13 March 2023

Member of the National Assembly of South Africa
- In office 22 May 2019 – 1 March 2023
- Constituency: Free State

Personal details
- Born: 12 June 1984 (age 42) Bloemfontein, South Africa
- Party: African National Congress
- Education: Brebner High School
- Alma mater: Central University of Technology; University of the Free State
- Profession: Politician

Kathleen Dibolelo Mance (born 12 June 1984) is a South African politician who has been a Member of the Free State Executive Council for Public Works and Infrastructure and a Member of the Free State Provincial Legislature since March 2023. She is a former Member of the National Assembly of South Africa from the Free State. Mahlatsi is a member of the African National Congress.

== Early life and background ==
Mahlatsi was born on 12 June 1984 in Bloemfontein. She attended Brebner High School before going on to study at the Central University of Technology and the University of the Free State. Before she was elected to parliament in 2019, Mahlatsi worked for the Free State Department of Public Works, Roads and Transport and the Free State Department of Social Development.

== Political career ==
In December 2018, she was elected as the second deputy national secretary of the Young Communist League of South Africa. She was elected as deputy provincial secretary of the ANC in the Free State at the party's conference in January 2023.

=== Parliament ===
In 2019, Mahlatsi stood for election to the South African National Assembly as 5th on the ANC's list of National Assembly candidates from the Free State. The ANC dominated in the Free State, winning 8 out of the 11 list seats. Mahlatsi was elected in the election and was sworn into office at the first sitting of the new National Assembly on 22 May 2019.

On 27 June 2019, she was named to the Portfolio Committee on Agriculture, Land Reform and Rural Development. On 21 August 2019, she became a non-voting member of the Ad Hoc Committee to Amend Section 25 of the Constitution. Mahlatsi became a voting member on 10 February 2020.

Mahlatsi supports land expropriation without compensation. During the debate on the 2020 State of the Nation Address on 18 February 2020, Mahlatsi said: "As the ANC, we are looking at land, not property ... Hon. Speaker, the poor must be given means of production in order to defeat poverty. Land must be used as economic asset." In June 2020, she voted to re-establish the Ad Hoc Committee to Amend Section 25 of the Constitution after its term had expired. She said that the "land was stolen and must be returned" and that the ANC had considered the legal, economic and political implications of expropriation without compensation.

In April 2021, Mahlatsi criticised the United Democratic Movement leader, Bantu Holomisa's call for the dissolution of the national government and the appointment of an interim one until the next general elections in 2024, calling it misinformed, misguided and opportunistic.

Mahlatsi resigned from parliament on 1 March 2023.

=== Free State government ===
Mahlatsi was sworn in as a Member of the Free State Provincial Legislature on 13 March 2023. The following day, Mahlatsi was appointed as Member of the Executive Council (MEC) for Public Works and Infrastructure by premier Mxolisi Dukwana. She was reappointed to the role following the 2024 general election.

Through the department, Mance has launched the "back-to-school" campaign to encourage learners to choose maths and science as high school subjects and in January 2025, she kicked off the project by visiting St. Bernard Secondary School to hand over the first batch of maths, science, and technology kits to the grade 12 pupils.
