= Mann Oelrich =

South African politician (born 1938)

Member of the Free State Executive Council for Agriculture
- Premier: Winkie Direko
- Preceded by: Tate Makgoe

Personal details
- Born: Hermann Hans von Malitz Oelrich; 4 July 1938 (age 87)
- Citizenship: South Africa
- Party: Congress of the People (since 2008)
- Other political affiliations: African National Congress

Hermann Hans von Malitz Oelrich (born 4 July 1938) is a retired South African politician who served as the Free State's Member of the Executive Council (MEC) for Agriculture under Premier Winkie Direko. He was appointed to the position in June 2001 after gaining election to the Free State Provincial Legislature in 1999. Initially a member of the African National Congress (ANC), he defected to the Congress of the People in 2008 after leaving government.
