= Anna Buthelezi =

South African politician and civil servant (born 1965)

Personal details
- Born: 7 October 1965 (age 60)
- Citizenship: South Africa
- Party: African National Congress
- Spouse: Zacharia Phori (div. 2002)

Mamorena Annah Buthelezi (born 7 October 1965), formerly known as Anna Buthelezi-Phori, is a South African politician and civil servant who represented the African National Congress (ANC) in the Free State Provincial Legislature and Free State Executive Council. She is also a former Deputy Provincial Secretary of the ANC's Free State branch.

== Political career ==
Buthelezi was born on 7 October 1965. She served as Deputy Provincial Secretary of the ANC's Free State branch from 1994 to 1997 under Provincial Chairperson Pat Matosa. She subsequently represented the ANC in the Free State Provincial Legislature and in the Free State Executive Council. She served as Member of the Executive Council (MEC) for Social Welfare until 28 June 2001, when Premier Winkie Direko announced a reshuffle which saw Buthelezi fired and replaced by Beatrice Marshoff; the reshuffle was viewed as political, and especially as linked to Buthelezi's alignment to ANC Provincial Chairperson Ace Magashule.

After her dismissal from the Executive Council, Buthelezi continued to serve as an ordinary Member of the Provincial Legislature, and she remained in her seat after the 2004 general election, chairing the Portfolio Committee on Local Government. By April 2005, the Mail & Guardian reported that she was no longer on good terms with Magashule.

As of 2011, she was a deputy director-general in the Free State's provincial Department of Cooperative Governance and Traditional Affairs.

== Personal life ==
Buthelezi was formerly married to Zacharia Phori, a National Intelligence Agency officer and former Umkhonto we Sizwe operative, with whom she has one son. They divorced in February 2002. During the divorce proceedings, in February 2002, Buthelezi laid an attempted murder charge against Phori, alleging that he had fired several shots at her car outside their house in Bayswater, Bloemfontein.
