= Sisi Mabe =

South African politician

Speaker of the Free State Provincial Legislature
- In office 21 May 2014 – 30 November 2014
- Preceded by: Ouma Tsopo
- Succeeded by: Mamiki Qabathe

Member of the Free State Provincial Legislature
- In office May 2009 – 30 November 2014

Member of the Free State Executive Council for Public Works
- In office February 2011 – May 2014
- Premier: Ace Magashule
- Preceded by: Fezi Ngumbentombi
- Succeeded by: Sam Mashinini

Member of the Free State Executive Council for Health
- In office May 2009 – February 2011
- Premier: Ace Magashule
- Preceded by: Sakhiwo Belot
- Succeeded by: Fezi Ngubentombi

Personal details
- Born: 21 August 1967 Phiritona, Heilbron; Orange Free State, South Africa
- Died: 30 November 2014 (aged 47) Vereeniging, Gauteng
- Party: African National Congress
- Other party: South African Communist Party

Elisa Sisi Mabe (21 August 1967 – 30 November 2014) was a South African politician who represented the African National Congress (ANC) in the Free State Provincial Legislature and National Council of Provinces. At the time of her death in 2014, she had recently been elected as the Speaker of the Free State Provincial Legislature and as a member of the ANC's National Executive Committee.

A teacher by training, Mabe entered politics through the South African Democratic Teachers Union and was also active in the ANC Women's League. Prior to her election as speaker in May 2014, she served in the Free State Executive Council under Premier Ace Magashule: she was a Member of the Executive Council (MEC) for Health from 2009 to 2011 and MEC for Public Works from 2011 to 2014.

== Early life and career ==
Mabe was born on 21 August 1967 in Phiritona in Heilbron in the former Orange Free State. She matriculated in Heilbron and obtained teaching diplomas at the Sefikeng College of Education in QwaQwa. She later earned an Honours degree in leadership and management from the University of the Free State.

During her career as a teacher, Mabe was active in the South African Democratic Teachers Union (SADTU), where she was elected to the executive and given responsibility for gender issues. She later became active in the ANC Women's League (ANCWL) and rose through the ranks to serve as Regional Treasurer of the ANCWL in the Free State. She was also a member of the South African Communist Party.

== Political career ==
=== Executive Council: 2009–2014 ===
Mabe formerly represented the ANC in the National Council of Provinces. In the 2009 general election, she was elected to a seat in the Free State Provincial Legislature, ranked sixth on the ANC's provincial party list. After the election, on 11 May 2009, newly elected Premier Ace Magashule announced that Mabe would join the Free State Executive Council as a Member of the Executive Council (MEC) for Health. She remained in that office until February 2011, when, in a mid-term reshuffle, she was appointed MEC for Public Works.

While she was serving as Public Works MEC, Mabe stood as a candidate at the ANC's 53rd National Conference in December 2012; she was elected to a five-year term as an ordinary member of the party's National Executive Committee. By number of votes received, she was the 32nd-most popular of the 80 ordinary members elected. She was also elected to the National Working Committee.

=== Speaker: 2014 ===
In the next general election in 2014, Mabe was re-elected to her legislative seat, ranked second on the ANC's provincial party list. Instead of returning to the Executive Council, she was elected as Speaker of the Free State Provincial Legislature. Her election was in line with the ANCWL's directive that provinces with a male Premier should elect a female Speaker. The Sunday Times, however, described her as "out of her depth" in the office.

== Personal life and death ==
Less than a year after her election as Speaker, Mabe died in hospital in Vereeniging, Gauteng on 30 November 2014. A government spokesperson said that her death followed a long illness. Her funeral was held in Heilbron in December.

She was married to River Mabe, who predeceased her, and had three children. In April 2011, while Mabe was serving as Public Works MEC, City Press alleged that she had had an affair with national minister Sicelo Shiceka. According to the newspaper, they had a child together.
