= Montseng Tsiu =

South African politician, trade unionist and nurse

Montseng Tsiu MPL
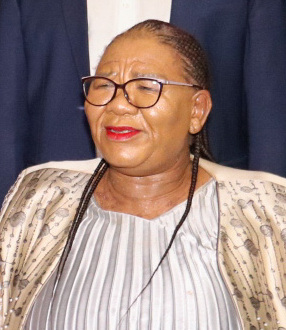
- Tsiu in 2022

Member of the Free State Executive Council for Health
- In office 9 May 2018 – 14 March 2023
- Premier: Sisi Ntombela
- Preceded by: Butana Komphela
- Succeeded by: Mathabo Leeto

Member of the Free State Provincial Legislature
- Incumbent
- Assumed office 23 April 2018
- Preceded by: William Bulwane

Personal details
- Party: African National Congress
- Profession: Politician

Montseng Margaret Tsiu is a South African politician, trade unionist and nurse who served as the Member of the Executive Council (MEC) for Health in the Free State provincial government from May 2018 until March 2023. She was sworn in as a Member of the Free State Provincial Legislature for the African National Congress in April 2018. Tsiu is the former provincial chairperson of the National Education, Health and Allied Workers' Union and the former director of nursing in the Free State government.

== Early life and education ==
She acquired an Overseas School Certificate through the St Catherine College in Maseru, Lesotho. She later earned a diploma in general nursing and a diploma in midwifery from the School of Nursing in Maseru. Tsiu obtained a diploma in Community Nursing Science from the University of the Free State before receiving a post-graduate diploma in Public Management at the Regenesys Business School.

== Political career ==
Tsiu served as the chairperson of the National Education, Health and Allied Workers' Union in the Free State for nine years and was a member of the union's National Executive Committee (NEC). She was also a member of the Provincial Executive Committee of the African National Congress.

Tsiu stood unsuccessfully for the Free State Provincial Legislature on the ANC list in the 2014 election.

== Free State provincial government ==
Tsiu is the former director of nursing in the Free State Department of Health. She became an ANC member of the Free State Legislature on 23 April 2018, filling the vacancy created by the resignation of William Bulwane who had been sworn in two weeks earlier. Shortly afterwards, Tsiu was appointed to the Executive Council of the Free State led by premier Sisi Ntombela; she took over the health portfolio from Butana Komphela who had been moved to the Social Development portfolio. NEHAWU welcomed her appointment.

In the 2019 elections, Tsiu was elected to her first full term in the provincial legislature. Ntombela announced her new executive council shortly after her swearing-in and Tsiu was re-appointed as MEC for Health.

Tsiu led the provincial government's response against the COVID-19 pandemic. In May 2020, Tsiu and Dr David Motau welcomed 17 Cuban doctors to the Free State to assist the province in dealing with the pandemic.

In November 2022, Tsiu expressed her support for pit bulls to be removed from Free State communities after a three-year-old boy was mauled to death by two dogs, including a pit bull, in Hennenman.

On 14 March 2023, newly elected Free State premier Mxolisi Dukwana named his executive council following Ntombela's resignation in February; former MEC Mathabo Leeto was appointed to succeed Tsiu.

== Personal life ==
In October 2020, Tsiu and premier Ntombela both tested positive for COVID-19 during the COVID-19 pandemic in South Africa.

Political offices
Preceded by Butana Komphela	Member of the Free State Executive Council for Health; 2018–2023	Succeeded by Mathabo Leeto
