= Motshidisi Koloi =

South African politician and educator

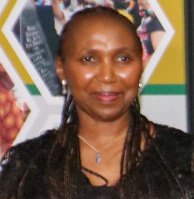
- Koloi in 2022

Member of the Executive Council of the Free State for Social Development
- In office 14 March 2023 – 18 October 2023
- Premier: Mxolisi Dukwana
- Preceded by: Mamiki Qabathe
- Succeeded by: Mathabo Leeto

Member of the Free State Executive Council for Public Works and Human Settlements
- In office 28 May 2019 – 14 March 2023
- Premier: Sisi Ntombela
- Preceded by: Dora Kotzee
- Succeeded by: Dibolelo Mahlatsi

Member of the Free State Provincial Legislature
- In office 22 May 2019 – 18 October 2023

Personal details
- Born: 1970 or 1971 (age 54–55)
- Party: African National Congress
- Profession: Politician

Motshidisi Agnes Koloi (born 1970 or 1971), also spelled Motshidise, is a South African politician and educator who served as the Member of the Executive Council (MEC) for Social Development in the Free State provincial government between March and October 2023. Before that, she was MEC for Public Works and Human Settlements from May 2019 until March 2023. She served in the Free State Provincial Legislature as an ANC representative from May 2019 until October 2023. Prior to her election to the Provincial Legislature, Koloi had served as the executive mayor of the Moqhaka Local Municipality.

== Background ==
Koloi holds a primary teacher's diploma and a diploma in education management. She proceeded to work as an educator before becoming active in politics. Koloi was a councillor for the African National Congress on the municipal council of the Moqhaka Local Municipality. She gradually rose in the municipal leadership ranks, going from part-time councillor to chief whip of the council before becoming the executive mayor of the municipality. As mayor of Moqhaka, she was elected as one of three deputy provincial chairpersons of the South African Local Government Association in November 2016.

== Provincial government ==
Koloi was elected to the Free State Provincial Legislature in the 2019 general election as one of 19 ANC representatives. Shortly afterwards, re-elected premier Sisi Ntombela announced her new executive council for the sixth administration wherein Koloi was appointed as the Member of the Executive Council for Public Works and Human Settlements, succeeding Dorah Kotzee, who left the provincial legislature.

In May 2021, Koloi was appointed to serve on the Interim Provincial Executive Committee of the ANC after the 2018 Free State ANC provincial elective conference where the previous PEC was elected, was declared unlawful by the Supreme Court of Appeal.

Following Mxolisi Dukwana's election as Premier of the Free State, he moved Koloi to the Social Development portfolio of the executive council.

On 12 October 2023, Koloi and two other people were arrested by the Hawks' serious corruption investigation unit on charges relating to the hiring of sound system for the Nelson Mandela memorial lecture that never took place while she was mayor of the Moqhaka Local Municipality in 2017. They appeared in the Kroonstad Magistrate's Court the following day where they were charged with fraud, corruption, money laundering and contravention of the Municipal Finance Management Act and released on bail. Koloi resigned from the provincial government on 18 October 2023.
