= Zingile Dingani =

South African politician (born 1958)

Secretary to Parliament
- In office June 2004 – September 2012
- Deputy: Michael Coetzee
- Preceded by: Sindiso Mfenyana
- Succeeded by: Michael Coetzee

Member of the Free State Executive Council for Finance and Expenditure
- In office 1999–2004
- Succeeded by: Playfair Morule

Member of the Free State Provincial Legislature
- In office 1996–2004

Provincial Chairperson of the Free State African National Congress
- In office February 1997 – August 1998
- Deputy: Benny Kotsoane
- Preceded by: Pat Matosa
- Succeeded by: Ace Magashule

Member of the National Assembly
- In office May 1994 – December 1996
- Constituency: Free State

Personal details
- Born: Zingile Alfred Dingani; 8 September 1958 (age 67)
- Citizenship: South Africa
- Party: African National Congress
- Education: University of the Free State

Zingile Alfred Dingani (born 8 September 1958) is a South African politician and civil servant who was the Secretary to Parliament from June 2004 until his dismissal in September 2012. Before that, he was the Free State's Member of the Executive Council (MEC) for Finance and Expenditure from 1999 to 2004.

Dingani served in the National Assembly from 1994 to 1996 and in the Free State Provincial Legislature from 1996 to 2004. A member of the African National Congress (ANC) since 1982, he was also Provincial Chairperson of the ANC's Free State from 1997 to 1998. His dismissal as Secretary to Parliament followed a finding by Parliament that he had convened parliamentary rules and the Public Finance Management Act by soliciting and receiving an R186,000 advance on his salary.

== Early life and activism ==
Born on 8 September 1958, Dingani joined underground structures of the ANC in 1982, while the party was still banned by the apartheid government. A qualified teacher, he was national treasurer of the National Education Union. He studied undergraduate English and psychology part-time at Vista University, and later, in 2002, he completed an MBA in entrepreneurship at the University of the Free State.

== Legislative career ==
=== National Assembly: 1994–1996 ===
In South Africa's first post-apartheid elections in 1994, Dingani was elected to an ANC seat in the National Assembly, representing the Free State constituency. He deputised Gill Marcus while Marcus was chairman of the influential Joint Standing Committee on Finance, and when Marcus stepped down to become Deputy Minister of Finance in 1996, he was elected to replace her.

However, months later, Dingani resigned from his parliamentary seat in order to join the Free State Provincial Legislature, where he was sworn in on 18 December 1996. The shift followed rumours that he was a frontrunner for appointment as Premier of the Free State, though that position ultimately went to Ivy Matsepe-Casaburri instead.

=== Free State Legislature: 1996–2004 ===
==== ANC Provincial Chairperson: 1997–1998 ====
Shortly after his move to the Free State, in February 1997, Dingani was elected as Provincial Chairperson of the ANC's Free State branch. He won 218 votes, compared to the 189 votes won by the other candidate, Premier Matsepe-Casaburri. While Dingani was viewed as strongly aligned to his ousted predecessor, Mosiuoa Lekota, Matsepe-Casaburri was presumed to be the favoured candidate of the ANC's national leadership; the Mail & Guardian therefore described Dingani's election as "a clear message from the province's members to their national leadership... that they were unhappy with its meddling in provincial affairs". Ben Kotsoane was elected as Dingani's deputy.

In subsequent months, Dingani reportedly attempted – but largely failed – to resolve factional disputes in the provincial party. At the next provincial conference in August 1998, Dingani was not nominated for re-election, and he was succeeded as Provincial Chairperson by Ace Magashule.

==== Executive Council: 1999–2004 ====
In 1999, Dingani was appointed to the Free State Executive Council as MEC for Finance and Expenditure. In addition, in the general election of that year, he was elected to a full term in the provincial legislature. He left the provincial legislature and the Executive Council after the 2004 general election.

== Secretary to Parliament: 2004–2012 ==
At the beginning of the legislative term that followed the 2004 election, Dingani was appointed as Secretary to Parliament, the administrative head of both parliamentary chambers. He took office in June 2004 and succeeded Sindiso Mfenyana. His term coincided with the Travelgate scandal and was also marked by media reports of a power struggle between Dingani and the Speaker of the National Assembly, Baleka Mbete; Majority Chief Whip Mbulelo Goniwe apparently sided with Dingani.

=== 2009 suspension ===
In March 2009, the Speaker's office announced that Dingani had been suspended, apparently after independent auditors recommended that he should be sanctioned for failing to respond to nepotism complaints against Lulama Matyolo-Dube, the Secretary of the National Council of Provinces (NCOP). Shortly afterwards, Parliament's presiding officers announced that he would be subject to a disciplinary hearing on dereliction of duty charges related to his inaction against Matyolo-Dube. His deputy, Michael Coetzee, acted in his office while the hearing was ongoing. He returned to work in July 2009, following the 2009 general election, after being cleared of all charges.

=== 2012 dismissal ===
In March 2012, the Sunday Times reported that Dingani had spent R186,000 in parliamentary funds – granted to him as an advance on his R1.8 million salary – to build a boundary wall at his home in Panorama outside Cape Town. Through a spokesperson, Dingani confirmed the reports, saying that the new wall had been recommended as a security measure and that he was repaying the R186,000 in monthly instalments of R10,000. Chief Whip Mathole Motshekga called for an investigation. The presiding officers referred the matter to the Auditor-General for investigation, and Dingani was granted special leave from 26 March, with his deputy, Coetzee, again acting in his office.

The Auditor-General's report was submitted to Parliament in May and leaked to the Mail & Guardian in August. According to the newspaper, the report concluded that Dingani should face disciplinary action for misleading the presiding officers: Dingani had apparently told Speaker Max Sisulu and NCOP Chairperson Mninwa Mahlangu that parliamentary policies allowed for the granting of salary advances, in direct contradiction of a 2009 directive approved by Dingani.

On 6 September, a disciplinary panel found Dingani guilty of two of nine charges of misconduct; it concluded that he had "improperly induced" the presiding officers to permit the advance and had also improperly, and in contravention of the Public Finance Management Act, sought an interest-free loan from Parliament. The panel recommended Dingani's immediate dismissal, and the National Assembly unanimously adopted its report on 11 September, approving Dingani's dismissal. He was replaced as Secretary by Coetzee. In the aftermath, he challenged Parliament's decision at the Commission for Conciliation, Mediation and Arbitration.
