= Benny Malakoane =

South African politician

Member of the Free State Executive Council for Agriculture and Rural Development
- In office May 2018 – May 2019
- Premier: Sisi Ntombela
- Preceded by: Oupa Khoabane
- Succeeded by: William Bulwane

Member of the Free State Executive Council for Economic and Small Business Development, Tourism and Environmental Affairs
- In office October 2016 – May 2018
- Premier: Ace Magashule
- Preceded by: Sam Mashinini
- Succeeded by: Limakatso Mahasa

Member of the Free State Executive Council for Health
- In office March 2013 – October 2016
- Premier: Ace Magashule
- Preceded by: Fezi Ngumbentombi
- Succeeded by: Butana Komphela

Member of the Free State Executive Council for Tourism, Environmental and Economic Affairs
- In office May 2004 – April 2005
- Premier: Beatrice Marshoff
- Preceded by: Sakhiwo Belot
- Succeeded by: Neo Masithela

Personal details
- Born: Kroonstad, Orange Free State; South Africa
- Party: African National Congress
- Education: Medunsa (MBChB); University of the Free State (PhD)

Benjamin "Benny" Malakoane is a South African politician and medical doctor who served in the Free State Executive Council from 2004 to 2005 and from 2013 to 2019. A member of the African National Congress (ANC), he dropped out of the Executive Council after failing to gain re-election to the Free State Provincial Legislature in the 2019 general election.

Malakoane was best known for his tenure as Member of the Executive Council (MEC) for Health from 2013 to 2016, in which capacity he faced continuous opposition from the Treatment Action Campaign. Between 2013 and 2018, he also faced criminal charges in connection with alleged procurement corruption at Matjhabeng Local Municipality, where Malakoane served as municipal manager from 2007 to 2010 during a hiatus from legislative politics.

== Early life and education ==
Malakoane is from Kroonstad in the former Orange Free State. He is a medical doctor: he completed his MBChB at the Medical University of Southern Africa, as well as a Master's in family medicine at the University of the Free State. In December 2022, he received a PhD in community health from the University of the Free State.

== Political career ==
=== Marshoff premiership: 2004–2005 ===
Malakoane was first appointed to the Free State Executive Council on 3 May 2004, when Premier Beatrice Marshoff announced her cabinet following her election in the 2004 general election. She named Malakoane as Member of the Executive Council (MEC) for Tourism, Environmental and Economic Affairs. He remained in that position only until Marshoff's first reshuffle in early April 2005, when he was sacked from the Executive Council.

He did not serve out the remainder of the legislative term as an ordinary Member of the Provincial Legislature: instead, in 2007, he left the provincial legislature to become municipal manager at Matjhabeng Local Municipality.

=== Magashule premiership: 2009–2018 ===
Malakoane did not initially secure re-election to the Free State Provincial Legislature after the 2009 general election, but instead continued as Matjhabeng municipal manager until 2010, when he was appointed chief executive officer at Bloemwater, a state-owned entity where he had previously served as chairperson of the board from 2009.

==== Health MEC: 2013–2016 ====
However, towards the end of the legislative term, in March 2013, Malakoane was returned to the Executive Council by Marshoff's successor, Premier Ace Magashule, who appointed Malakoane as MEC for Health; that position had been vacant since Fezi Ngumbentombi's death in December 2012.

Weeks after his appointment as MEC, on 10 July 2013, Malakoane was arrested at his home by the Hawks. He and several others were charged with corruption, fraud, and money laundering in connection with public contracts awarded irregularly at Matjhabeng Local Municipality between 2007 and 2010, while Malakoane had been municipal manager. He and his co-accused – who included Malakoane's fellow MEC Mathabo Leeto – were alleged to have accepted about R13-million in illegal kickbacks in connection with the contracts. He was released on bail and trialled in the Welkom and Bloemfontein Regional Courts. The charges against him were ultimately dropped, but not until July 2018.

With the charges against him pending, Malakoane was elected to a full term in the provincial legislature in the 2014 general election; he was ranked 17th on the ANC's provincial party list. After the election, Magashule announced that Malakoane would continue as MEC for Health in the new legislative term. However, Malakoane faced a sustained public campaign – led by the Treatment Action Campaign, an influential health lobby group – in support of calls to #FireBenny. In addition to the corruption charges against him, the Treatment Action Campaign alleged that Malakoane had unfairly intervened to secure an intensive-care bed for a politically connected patient, at the expense of other patients – an allegation which Malakoane denied. The Treatment Action Campaign also claimed that unlawful stem cell trials had been conducted in the Free State with Malakoane's full knowledge.

==== Economic Development MEC: 2016–2018 ====
In October 2016, Magashule announced a cabinet reshuffle which saw Malakoane leave the health portfolio to become MEC for Economic and Small Business Development, Tourism and Environmental Affairs, a reconfigured iteration of the portfolio he had held in 2004–5. The ANC denied that Malakoane had been removed from the health portfolio because of the public campaign against him.

=== Ntombela premiership: 2018–2019 ===
In March 2018, Magashule resigned as premier and was succeeded by Sisi Ntombela, who announced her first reshuffle on 9 May 2018. Malakoane was named as MEC for Agriculture and Rural Development. He remained in that post for one year: in the 2019 general election, he was ranked 24th on the ANC's party list and did not secure re-election to his seat in the provincial legislature.
