= Susan Mnumzana =

South African politician

Susan Kelisaletse Mnumzana is a South African politician who represented the African National Congress (ANC) in the National Assembly and Free State Provincial Legislature. She also served in the Free State Executive Council between 2005 and 2008 under Premier Beatrice Marshoff.

== Legislative career ==
In the 1999 general election, Mnumzana was elected to an ANC seat in the National Assembly. Years later, during investigations into the Travelgate scandal, Mnumzana admitted to a liquidation inquiry that she owed R2,238 to a travel agency, Bathong, where she had redeemed parliamentary travel vouchers during her time as an MP. The liquidators' attorneys investigated her further, finding that she had not accounted for a much larger sum in air tickets.

In the 2004 general election, Mnumzana was elected to a seat in the Free State Provincial Legislature, ranked sixth on the ANC's provincial party list. In April 2005, she was additionally appointed to the Free State Executive Council when Premier Beatrice Marshoff named her as Member of the Executive Council (MEC) for Arts and Culture. In a further reshuffle in August 2007, she was moved to a new portfolio as MEC for Agriculture; Mamiki Qabathe replaced her in that post in 2008. However, Mnumzana was re-elected to the provincial legislature in the 2009 general election, ranked 20th on the ANC's provincial party list.
