= Dora Kotzee =

South African politician

Member of the Free State Executive Council for Public Works and Infrastructure
- In office May 2015 – May 2018 (for Public Works and Infrastructure); May 2018 – 7 May 2019 (for Public Works, Infrastructure and Human Settlements)
- Premier: Ace Magashule; Sisi Ntombela
- Preceded by: Sam Mashinini (for Public Works and Infrastructure)
- Succeeded by: Motshidisi Koloi (for Public Works and Human Settlements)

Member of the Free State Provincial Legislature
- In office 21 May 2014 – 7 May 2019

Personal details
- Citizenship: South Africa
- Party: African National Congress

Dora Kotzee, sometimes misspelled Dorah Coetzee, is a South African politician who represented the African National Congress (ANC) in the Free State Provincial Legislature from 2014 to 2019. During that time, she served as the Free State's Member of the Executive Council (MEC) for Public Works and Infrastructure from 2015 to 2018, and from 2018 to 2019 she occupied an expanded portfolio as MEC for Public Works, Infrastructure and Human Settlements.

== Political career ==
Until 2014, Kotzee represented the ANC as a councillor in Lejweleputswa District Municipality and Matjhabeng Local Municipality. In the 2014 general election, she was narrowly elected to an ANC seat in the Free State Provincial Legislature, ranked 22nd on the ANC's provincial party list. She served as Deputy Majority Chief Whip in the legislature until May 2015, when Premier Ace Magashule announced that she would join the Free State Executive Council in a reshuffle. She succeeded Sam Mashinini as MEC for Public Works and Infrastructure.

Kotzee continued in that portfolio throughout the rest of Magashule's premiership and into the term of Magashule's successor, Premier Sisi Ntombela. In Ntombela's first reshuffle, announced in May 2018, Kotzee retained the Public Works and Infrastructure portfolio and was additionally allocated responsibility for the Human Settlements portfolio, making her MEC for Public Works, Infrastructure and Human Settlements.

The following year, Kotzee left the legislature and the Executive Council after the 2019 general election; ranked 25th on the ANC's party list, she did not secure re-election to her seat. As of 2022, she had returned to Lejweleputswa District Municipality, where she served as a councillor and Member of the Mayoral Committee.
