= Thabo Manyoni =

South African politician

Executive Mayor of Mangaung
- In office 2011–2016
- Preceded by: Playfair Morule
- Succeeded by: Olly Mlamleli

Deputy Provincial Chairperson of the African National Congress in the Free State
- In office 2008–2017
- Chairperson: Ace Magashule
- Preceded by: Pat Matosa
- Succeeded by: Paseka Nompondo

Member of the Free State Executive Council for Police, Roads and Transport
- In office 2009–2011
- Premier: Ace Magashule
- Preceded by: Office established
- Succeeded by: Butana Komphela

Personal details
- Born: 1 January 1960 (age 66)
- Party: African National Congress

Thabo Manyoni is a South African politician who was the Mayor of Mangaung Metropolitan Municipality from 2011 to 2016. He represented his party, the African National Congress (ANC), in the Free State Executive Council from 2009 to 2011 and in the National Assembly from 2016 to 2017. He was Deputy Provincial Chairperson of the ANC's Free State branch from 2008 to 2017. He was also Chairperson of the South African Local Government Association from 2011 to 2016 and in 2019 he was appointed to a five-year term as Chairperson of South Africa's Municipal Demarcation Board.

== Early life and career ==
Manyoni was born on 1 January 1960. He has a Bachelor of Arts degree. After 1994, he held various jobs in post-apartheid public administration, including in the Free State Tourism Board and the Maluti-a-Phofung Local Municipality. By 2008, he was the municipal manager at the Free State's Mangaung Local Municipality. He was suspended from that position in 2008; according to the Mail & Guardian, his suspension was spearheaded by the incumbent Mayor of Mangaung, Gertrude Mothupi.

At the same time, Manyoni was an active member of the African National Congress (ANC). His local branch of the ANC is in the Free State's Motheo region. In July 2008, while he was in court challenging his suspension from the Mangaung municipality, he was elected unopposed as Deputy Provincial Chairperson of the ANC's Free State branch, under Provincial Chairperson Ace Magashule.

== Career as a public representative ==
=== Executive Council: 2009–2011 ===
Pursuant to the April 2009 general election, Magashule was elected Premier of the Free State and appointed Manyoni to the Free State Executive Council, where he became Member of the Executive Council (MEC) for Police, Roads and Transport.

=== Mayor of Mangaung: 2011–2016 ===
Manyoni left the Executive Council after the 2011 local government elections, in which he was elected Executive Mayor of the new Mangaung Metropolitan Municipality; he was succeeded as MEC by Butana Komphela. In September of that year, he was elected National Chairperson of the South African Local Government Association (SALGA).

He was also re-elected unopposed to his party office as ANC Deputy Provincial Chairperson – indeed, he was re-elected twice, because the 2012 party elective conference was nullified by a court and rerun in May 2013. The following year, he was shortlisted for the City Mayors Foundation's World Mayor Prize.

However, ahead of the 2016 local government elections, the ANC announced that Manyoni would not stand for a second term as mayor; instead, the party's mayoral candidate in Mangaung would be MEC Olly Mlamleli. Manyoni said he was surprised by the announcement.

=== National Assembly: 2016–2017 ===
In September 2016, the ANC announced that it had adjusted its party list and would send Manyoni to the National Assembly, the lower house of the national Parliament of South Africa, to fill the next casual vacancy that arose. He was sworn into a seat in early October. At the same time, he resigned his SALGA office, which was taken up in an acting capacity by former Johannesburg Mayor Parks Tau. Manyoni resigned from Parliament less than a year into his tenure, in May 2017.

== Aftermath ==
=== Bid for ANC chair: 2017 ===
By mid-2017, towards the end of his second term as ANC Deputy Provincial Chairperson, Manyoni had emerged as a possible candidate to unseat Magashule as Provincial Chairperson in the Free State. The Citizen said that he presented the most serious challenge to Magashule's incumbency that Magashule had faced during his long tenure in the party office. According to the newspaper, his campaign emphasised an anti-corruption agenda and was aligned to Deputy President Cyril Ramaphosa, who during that period was standing for election as national ANC President. Manyoni said that he had been involved in "supporting wrong things", such as vote-rigging, while he was Magashule's deputy, but that he had since had a Damascus moment.

However, when the next provincial elective conference was held in December 2017, Manyoni boycotted it, alleging that there had been irregularities in the electoral process. He had been nominated for the chairmanship by 25 local party branches – compared to 204 for Magashule – but declined the nominations by phone, leaving Magashule to stand unopposed. He was succeeded as Deputy Provincial Chairperson by Paseka Nompondo.

The outcome of the elective conference was later nullified by the high court. The provincial leadership corps elected in 2017 was dissolved by the ANC's National Executive Committee and Manyoni was appointed as a member of the interim committee established to lead the provincial party until fresh elections could be held.

=== Municipal Demarcation Board: 2019–2022 ===
At the beginning of March 2019, President Cyril Ramaphosa appointed Manyoni to a five-year term as Chairperson of the national Municipal Demarcation Board, a full-time job. By 2022, it was clear that Manyoni intended to stand again for election as ANC Provincial Chairperson in the Free State; the opposition Democratic Alliance (DA) objected strenuously, calling for Manyoni to resign on the grounds that his party-political interests undermined the Municipal Demarcation Board's independence. Manyoni promised to vacate his seat on the board if and when he won election to the ANC office.
