= William Bulwane =

South African politician

William Bulwane MPL

Free State MEC for Police, Roads and Transport
- In office 1 October 2021 – 14 March 2023
- Premier: Sisi Ntombela
- Preceded by: Sam Mashinini
- Succeeded by: Maqueen Letsoha-Mathae

Free State MEC for Agriculture and Rural Development
- In office 28 May 2019 – 1 October 2021
- Premier: Sisi Ntombela
- Preceded by: Benny Malakoane
- Succeeded by: Thembeni Nxangisa

Member of the Free State Provincial Legislature
- In office 4 April 2018 – 23 April 2018

Personal details
- Born: Kwekwe William Bulwane
- Party: African National Congress
- Profession: Politician

Kwekwe William Bulwane is a South African politician who has been a member of the Free State Provincial Legislature since May 2019. He had previously served as an MPL in April 2018. Bulwane had previously served in the Free State Executive Council as the Member of the Executive Council for Agriculture and Rural Development from May 2019 to October 2021 and as the MEC for Police, Roads and Transport from October 2021 until his demotion from the Executive Council in March 2023.

== Political career ==
Bulwane is a member of the African National Congress. He served the party's deputy provincial chairperson from the 2018 conference until the dissolution of the provincial leadership by the Supreme Court of Appeal in May 2021. He was previously the provincial secretary. Bulwane also served as the speaker of the Metsimaholo Local Municipality.

Bulwane was sworn in as a Member of the Free State Provincial Legislature on 4 April 2018. He replaced former premier Ace Magashule, who had resigned to take up the post of secretary-general of the ANC full time. After serving less than three weeks, he resigned his seat on 23 April. Montseng Tsiu replaced him in the legislature.

However, he returned to the provincial legislature after the provincial election held on 8 May 2019. On 28 May, premier Sisi Ntombela appointed him Member of the Executive Council for Agriculture and Rural Development. He was sworn in on the same day.

On 1 October 2021, Bulwane was appointed as MEC for Police, Roads and Transport, replacing Sam Mashinini, who was dismissed as an MEC.

Following Mxolisi Dukwana's election as Premier of the Free State in February 2023, he appointed his Executive Council the following month which saw Maqueen Letsoha-Mathae succeed Bulwane as MEC for Community Safety, Roads and Transport.

== Personal life ==
In August 2018, Bulwane announced that his BMW X5 was used during a cash-in-transit heist in Bloemfontein. He said that he had handed his car to a panel beater for repairs following an accident in May of the same year. He laid charges against the panel beater but police questioned his possible link to the heist. On Thursday 7 April 2022, in his budget speech, the Free State MEC for Police, Roads and Transport, William Bulwane, blamed Jan van Riebeeck for the poor condition of the province’s roads.
