= Benny Kotsoane =

South African politician (1966–2025)

Member of the Free State Provincial Legislature
- In office 1994–2006

Personal details
- Born: Itumeleng William Kotsoane; 17 October 1966 Bloemfontein, Orange Free State, South Africa
- Died: 30 March 2025 (aged 58)
- Party: African National Congress

Itumeleng William "Benny" Kotsoane (17 August 1966 – 30 March 2025) was a South African politician and civil servant who represented the African National Congress (ANC) in the Free State Provincial Legislature from 1994 to 2006. Simultaneously, from 1996 to 2005, he served in the Free State Executive Council: he was Member of the Executive Council (MEC) for Local Government and Housing (1996–1999 and 2004–2005), MEC for Environmental Affairs and Tourism (1999–2001) and MEC for Safety and Security (2001–2004). He was also a former Deputy Provincial Chairperson of the ANC's Free State branch, an office he held from 1997 to 1998.

In May 2006, Kotsoane left frontline politics to enter public service as Director-General at the national Department of Housing, where he worked under Minister Lindiwe Sisulu from May 2006 until 2009. He initially remained in that position under Sisulu's successor, Tokyo Sexwale, but, less than six months into Sexwale's tenure, announced his departure in November 2009.

== Early life ==
Kotsoane was born on 17 August 1966 in Bloemfontein in the former Orange Free State. From 1980 to 1989, he lived in the township of Botshabelo, where he became active in anti-apartheid activism, including through the Congress of South African Students and through local affiliates of the United Democratic Front.

== Legislative career ==
In South Africa's first democratic elections in 1994, Kotsoane was elected to represent the African National Congress (ANC) in the Free State Provincial Legislature. During his first legislative term, Kotsoane was appointed to the Free State Executive Council, serving as Member of the Executive Council (MEC) for Local Government and Housing from 1996 to 1999. Simultaneously, between 1997 and 1998, he served as Deputy Provincial Chairperson of the ANC's Free State branch, having been elected to that position in February 1997; he deputised Provincial Chairperson Zingile Dingani.

Pursuant to the 1999 general election, Kotsoane was re-elected to his legislative seat, and newly elected Premier Winkie Direko moved him to a new post as MEC for Environmental Affairs and Tourism. He remained in that position until June 2001, when Direko announced a reshuffle in which Kotsoane took over the Safety and Security portfolio, previously led by Casca Mokitlane. In the next general election in 2004, Kotsoane was re-elected to a third term in the legislature but Direko was succeeded as Premier by Beatrice Marshoff, who returned Kotsoane to his former portfolio as MEC for Local Government and Housing. Less than a year later, in April 2005, Marshoff sacked Kotsoane from the Executive Council, replacing him with Malefetsane Joel Mafereka. Kotsoane was therefore demoted to serve as an ordinary Member of the Provincial Legislature.

== Career in public administration ==
Kotsoane left the provincial legislature in May 2006 when President Thabo Mbeki appointed him as Director-General at the national Department of Housing, then under the political leadership of Minister Lindiwe Sisulu. Later that year, the Mail & Guardian described his performance as middling, saying that he "seems to have quietly taken his time coming to terms with the enormous challenges facing his department". During his years in the position, Kotsoane received significant public attention because of the department's role in the highly controversial, and allegedly mismanaged, N2 Gateway project.

Following the 2009 general election, Tokyo Sexwale succeeded Sisulu in the newly renamed Ministry of Human Settlements. Although Kotsoane's contract was not due to expire until 2011, the Sunday Independent reported that he had a poor working relationship with Sexwale and faced dismissal. In early November 2009, Kotsoane announced that he had agreed to leave the department; he said that he would likely be transferred to the Department of Public Works.

Later, in May 2012, Minister Sexwale appointed Kotsoane to a three-year term on the board of the National Home Builders Registration Council. The Sunday World reported in 2021 that Kotsoane was expected to return to work for another former boss because Sisulu reportedly intended to hire him to advise her in her new role as Minister of Human Settlements, Water and Sanitation.

== Personal life and death ==
Kotsoane was married and had three children. He died on 30 March 2025, at the age of 58.
