= Tate Makgoe =

South African politician (1963–2023)

Dr Tate Makgoe
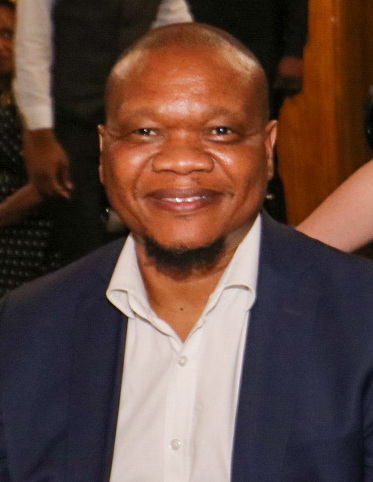
- Makgoe in 2022

Member of the Free State Executive Council for Education
- In office 11 May 2009 – 5 March 2023
- Premier: Ace Magashule; Sisi Ntombela; Mxolisi Dukwana
- Preceded by: Mxolisi Dukwana (acting)
- Succeeded by: Makalo Mohale

Member of the Free State Provincial Legislature
- In office May 1994 – 5 March 2023

Member of the Free State Executive Council for Finance
- In office 20 April 2005 – 11 May 2009
- Premier: Beatrice Marshoff
- Preceded by: Playfair Morule
- Succeeded by: Seiso Mohai
- In office 1994–1996
- Premier: Mosioua Lekota
- Preceded by: Office established

Member of the Free State Executive Council for Public Safety, Security and Liaison
- In office 3 May 2004 – 20 April 2005
- Premier: Beatrice Marshoff
- Preceded by: Itumeleng Benny Kotsoane
- Succeeded by: Playfair Morule

Personal details
- Born: Pule Herbert Isak Makgoe; 12 May 1963 Tumahole, Parys, Orange Free State Province, South Africa
- Died: 5 March 2023 (aged 59) N1 near Winburg, Free State, South Africa
- Party: African National Congress
- Spouse: Ivy Makgoe
- Children: 3
- Education: University of South Africa (BCom, MBL); University of the Free State (BComHons)
- Occupation: Politician
- Profession: Politician
- Nickname: Mr Simply the best

Pule Herbert Isak Makgoe (12 May 1963 – 5 March 2023) was a South African politician and anti-apartheid activist. A member of the African National Congress, he was elected to the Free State Provincial Legislature in 1994. After holding multiple positions in the Executive Council of the Free State, he was appointed Member of the Executive Council for Education in May 2009, a position he would hold until his death in March 2023.

== Early life and education ==
Makgoe was born on 12 May 1963 in Tumahole outside Parys in the Orange Free State Province. He received his primary education in Tumahole and attended high school in Sebokeng. He trained as a chemical engineer at the Technikon Vaal Triangle. He earned a Bachelor of Commerce from the University of South Africa before earning a BCom honours degree from the University of the Free State. Makgoe later received a master's degree in business leadership from UNISA. In September 2018, he received an honorary doctorate in Business Administration from the Vaal University of Technology. At the time of his death in March 2023, Makgoe was enrolled for a Doctor of Philosophy in Education at the University of the Free State.

== Early political career ==
Makgoe left South Africa in 1984 to join the military wing of the African National Congress, Umkhonto we Sizwe. He was incarcerated at the Sun City Prison between 1986 and 1991 due to his involvement in anti-apartheid activities. After the ANC was unbanned, Makgoe served on the party's Northern Free State Regional Executive Committee in 1991. He was the party's provincial campaign manager in the Free State in the 1994 general elections. Makgoe was the ANC's provincial treasurer between 1998 and 2001 and served on the Provincial Executive Committee.

== Free State Provincial Government ==
Makgoe was elected to the Free State Provincial Legislature in the 1994 election. He was appointed to the first Executive Council of the Free State as the Member of the Executive Council (MEC) for Finance, a position he would hold until he and the provincial executive council resigned in 1996. In 1997, he was appointed MEC for Tourism and Environmental Affairs by newly elected premier Ivy Matsepe-Casaburri.

Following his re-election in 1999, Makgoe was appointed MEC for Agriculture by then premier Winkie Direko. He would not hold the position for long as he was fired as an MEC during cabinet reshuffle by Direko in June 2001. Makgoe then served as chairperson of committees in the Free State legislature between 2001 and 2004. Makgoe returned to the executive council after the 2004 general election when newly appointed premier Beatrice Marshoff announced that Makgoe would take up the role of MEC for Public Safety, Security and Liaison. Less than one year later, in April 2005, Makgoe was appointed MEC for Finance in a reshuffle done by Marshoff.

Ace Magashule was elected as premier following the 2009 general election and announced his executive council on 11 May 2009, in which Makgoe was named MEC for Education. Makgoe would remain in the position during Magashule and Sisi Ntombela premierships. Following his re-appointment to the role in May 2019 by Ntombela, Makgoe was noted as being the province's longest serving MEC.

During his tenure, the Free State became the province with the highest matriculation rate in the country for four years in a row. In May 2021, Makgoe was conferred the Chancellor's Excellence Award by the Central University of Technology for his contribution to education. Makgoe led an anti-bullying campaign in March 2022 following incidents of alleged racism and discrimination in the Lejweleputswa District.

Makgoe served on the Council of the University of the Free State as the representative of the Premier of the Free State between 1 November 2010 to 31 December 2018.

== Personal life ==
Makgoe was married to Ivy and they had three children together.

On 26 July 2020, Ntombela announced that Makgoe had contracted COVID-19 and had also been admitted to a hospital. She named Makalo Mohale as his acting successor until further notice.

== Death ==
Makgoe and his bodyguard, Warrant Office Vuyo Mdi, died in the early hours of 5 March 2023 in a car accident on the N1 highway outside Winburg when the car they were travelling in collided with two stray cows at a very high rate of speed. Makgoe and Mdi were declared deceased on the scene, while driver Pule Nkopane was transferred to the Winburg Hospital. President Cyril Ramaphosa, the Minister of Basic Education Angie Motshekga, newly elected Free State premier Mxolisi Dukwana, and the South African Democratic Teachers Union paid tribute to Makgoe.
