= Butana Komphela =

South African politician (1955–2022)

Member of the Free State Provincial Legislature
- In office 14 June 2011 – 7 May 2019

Member of the Free State Executive Council for Social Development
- In office May 2018 – May 2019
- Premier: Sisi Ntombela
- Preceded by: Limakatso Mahasa
- Succeeded by: Mamiki Qabathe

Member of the Free State Executive Council for Health
- In office October 2016 – May 2018
- Premier: Ace Magashule; Sisi Ntombela
- Preceded by: Benny Malakoane
- Succeeded by: Montseng Tsiu

Member of the Free State Executive Council for Police, Roads and Transport
- In office June 2011 – October 2016
- Premier: Ace Magashule
- Preceded by: Thabo Manyoni
- Succeeded by: Sam Mashinini

Personal details
- Born: 7 December 1955
- Died: 24 January 2022 (aged 66) Bloemfontein, Free State; South Africa
- Party: African National Congress
- Relations: Steve Komphela (brother)

Butana Moses Komphela (7 December 1955 – 24 January 2022) was a South African politician who represented the African National Congress (ANC) in the National Assembly and Free State Provincial Legislature until 2019. He served as the Chairperson of the Portfolio Committee on Sports, Arts and Culture and after that he held several positions in the Free State Executive Council from 2011 to 2019. He died of COVID-19-related illness in 2022 during the COVID-19 pandemic in South Africa.

== Early life ==
Komphela was born on 7 December 1955. He was the elder brother of Steve Komphela, the former coach of Mamelodi Sundowns.

== Parliament: 2001–2011 ==
After the end of apartheid in 1994, Komphela represented the ANC in the Free State Provincial Legislature until June 2001, when the ANC announced a reshuffle in which he was transferred to a seat in the National Assembly, the lower house of the South African Parliament. he was sworn in on 3 July 2001 and swopped seats with Seiso Mohai, who filled his place in the provincial legislature. He was elected to a full term in the assembly in the 2004 general election.

Komphela rose to public prominence as the Chairperson of the Portfolio Committee on Sports, Arts and Culture, a position to which he was elected in June 2004. According to journalist Stephen Grootes, he was viewed as a firm supporter of former President Thabo Mbeki, although he was suspected of changing his allegiance after Mbeki's rival, Jacob Zuma, won election as ANC President in 2007. He was re-elected to his seat in the National Assembly in the 2009 general election, but he left Parliament in June 2011 when he was appointed to the Free State Executive Council in a reshuffle by Premier Ace Magashule.

== Provincial legislature: 2011–2019 ==
Komphela joined Magashule's provincial government as the Free State's Member of the Executive Council (MEC) for Police, Roads and Transport; he filled a vacancy that had arisen from Thabo Manyoni's resignation. He served in that position for over five years and, in the middle of that period, he secured re-election to the Free State Provincial Legislature in the 2014 general election; he was ranked fifth on the ANC's provincial party list.

In October 2016, Magashule announced a reshuffle that saw Komphela replace Benny Malakoane as MEC for Health. He retained that portfolio for the rest of Magashule's premiership and into the term of Magashule's successor, Premier Sisi Ntombela. In her first reshuffle in May 2018, Ntombela moved Komphela to a new position as MEC for Social Development.

He did not seek re-election to the Free State Provincial Legislature in the 2019 general election and he therefore dropped out of the Executive Council after the election.

== Culpable homicide charge ==
On 6 January 2019, Komphela was involved in a traffic accident on the road from Theunissen to Bloemfontein. His BMW reportedly veered to the right and crossed barrier lines to collide with a car that was driving in the opposite direction. One of the passengers in the other car died at the scene and Komphela was charged with culpable homicide. He was found guilty on 22 November 2021 and the Brandfort Magistrate's Court sentenced him to three years' imprisonment; the sentence was suspended for five years on the condition that Komphela did not commit a similar offence during the period of suspension.

== Death ==
In December 2021, Komphela was admitted to hospital in Bloemfontein, where he received treatment for COVID-19-related illness, complicated by a pre-existing lung condition. He died in hospital on 24 January 2022.
