= Zanele Dlungwana =

South African politician (born 1952)

Member of the National Assembly
- In office 15 May 2008 – May 2009
- Constituency: Free State

Member of the Free State Provincial Legislature
- In office June 1999 – May 2008

Personal details
- Born: 16 January 1952 (age 74)
- Citizenship: South Africa
- Party: African National Congress

Zanele Patricia "Pat" Dlungwana (born 16 January 1952) is a South African politician who represented the African National Congress (ANC) in the Free State Provincial Legislature from 1999 to 2008. During that time, she served in the Free State Executive Council under Premier Beatrice Marshoff from 2004 to 2008. She later served a brief term in the National Assembly from 2008 to 2009.

== Legislative career ==
A former librarian from Qwaqwa, Dlungwana was elected to the provincial legislature in the 1999 general election and was re-elected in the 2004 general election. In the aftermath of the 2004 election, on 3 May 2004, Premier Marshoff appointed her as Member of the Executive Council (MEC) for Social Development. In a reshuffle in August 2007, she was moved to a new portfolio as MEC for Public Safety and Liaison.

On 15 May 2008, Dlungwana vacated her seat in the provincial legislature in order to join the National Assembly, where she filled the casual vacancy arising from Sisi Ntombela's departure. She left Parliament after the 2009 general election.
