= Maqueen Letsoha-Mathae =

South African politician (born 1969)

Maqueen Letsoha-Mathae MPL

8th Premier of the Free State
- Incumbent
- Assumed office 14 June 2024
- Preceded by: Mxolisi Dukwana

Member of the Free State Executive Council for Community Safety, Roads and Transport
- In office 14 March 2023 – 14 June 2024
- Premier: Mxolisi Dukwana
- Preceded by: William Bulwane
- Succeeded by: Jabu Mbalula

Member of the Free State Provincial Legislature
- Incumbent
- Assumed office 13 March 2023

Personal details
- Born: 3 February 1969 (age 57)
- Party: African National Congress

Maqueen Joyce Letsoha-Mathae (born 3 February 1969) is a South African politician who is currently serving as the 8th Premier of the Free State. She was previously in the Free State Executive Council as the Member of the Executive Council (MEC) for Community Safety, Roads and Transport from March 2023 until June 2024. Letsoha-Mathae has been a Member of the Free State Provincial Legislature since March 2023. She is a member of the African National Congress.

== Controversies ==
In October 2024, the Economic Freedom Fighters and ActionSA in the Free State accused Letsoha-Mathae and her husband of receiving millions of rands in bribes to secure a road contract in Tweespruit.
