= Sam Mashinini =

South African politician (born 1959)

Sam Mashinini MPL

Free State MEC for Police, Roads & Transport
- In office 4 October 2016 – 1 October 2021
- Premier: Sisi Ntombela; Ace Magashule
- Preceded by: Butana Komphela
- Succeeded by: William Bulwane

Free State MEC for Economic and Small Business Development, Tourism and Environmental Affairs
- In office 6 May 2015 – 4 October 2016
- Premier: Ace Magashule
- Preceded by: Mosebenzi Zwane
- Succeeded by: Benny Malakoane

Free State MEC for Public Works and Infrastructure
- In office 29 May 2014 – 6 May 2015
- Preceded by: Sisi Mabe
- Succeeded by: Dorah Coetzee

Member of the Free State Provincial Legislature
- Incumbent
- Assumed office 21 May 2014

Personal details
- Born: Malambule Samuel Mashinini; 22 November 1959 (age 66) Proefplaas Farm, Union of South Africa
- Party: African National Congress
- Education: University of the Witwatersrand
- Profession: Politician

Malambule Samuel Mashinini (born 22 November 1959) is a South African politician and trade union leader who has been a member of the Free State Provincial Legislature since 2014. A member of the African National Congress, he was elected to the Free State Provincial Legislature in May 2014. He was then appointed as Member of the Executive Council (MEC) for the Department of Public Works and Infrastructure. A year later, he became the MEC for Economic and Small Business Development, Tourism and Environmental Affairs. Mashinini was appointed MEC for Police, Roads & Transport in October 2016. He was dismissed in October 2021.

== Early life and education ==
Mashinini was born on 22 November 1959 on the Proefplaas Farm. He received his primary school education on the farm, before moving to Bethlehem for his high school education, where he became involved in politics. He furthered his high school education in Selelekela in QwaQwa. He earned two honours degrees from the University of the Witwatersrand.

== Political career ==
Mashinini started working at the President Steyn Gold Mine in Welkom in 1982, where he joined the National Union of Mineworkers. He was then elected as NUM shop-steward for Shaft no 4 at the gold mine. He soon became shaft chairperson. In the 1990s, Mashinini was elected as the deputy regional secretary of NUM in the Free State before he was elected as regional secretary, a position which he held for two terms. He was appointed as the acting provincial secretary of the Congress of South African Trade Unions in the Free State and the Northern Cape in 1999. The following year, he was elected as the provincial secretary of COSATU. He held this position until 2014.

In 2011, Mashinini was elected to the provincial executive committee (PEC) of the African National Congress in the Free State. He was elected to the National Executive Committee of the African National Congress in 2012. He is currently serving as a member of the provincial working committee of the South African Communist Party. He also served on the Free State Development Corporation.

== Provincial government ==
In 2014, Mashinini was elected to the Free State Provincial Legislature as a member of the ANC. Premier Ace Magashule appointed him as the Member of the Executive Council (MEC) for the Department of Public Works and Infrastructure. During an executive council reshuffle in May 2015, Mashinini was appointed as the MEC for Economic and Small Business Development, Tourism and Environmental Affairs by Magashule.

In October 2016, Mashinini became the MEC for Police, Roads & Transport, replacing Butana Komphela.

Magashule resigned as premier and Sisi Ntombela was elected to replace him. Ntombela kept Mashinini as the MEC for Police, Roads & Transport. In May 2018, he was elected as the provincial chairperson of the ANC in the Free State. Mashinini has been described as an ally of the former premier. He remained as the MEC for Police, Roads & Transport after the 2019 elections.

On 31 March 2021, the Supreme Court of Appeal (SCA) declared the 2018 ANC Free State elective conference unlawful and unconstitutional, removing Mashinini as the ANC's provincial chairperson.

On 27 September 2021, Ntombela suspended Mashinini as the MEC for Police, Roads & Transport pending an investigation into the lack of progress into the construction of roads between Reitz and Tweeling, Cornelia and Villiers, and Oranjeville and Deneysville. Ntombela fired him on 1 October and replaced him with William Bulwane.
