= Mosebenzi Zwane =

South African minister

Mosebenzi Joseph Zwane

Minister of Mineral Resources
- In office 23 September 2015 – 28 February 2018
- President: Jacob Zuma; Cyril Ramaphosa
- Preceded by: Ngoako Ramathlodi
- Succeeded by: Gwede Mantashe

Personal details
- Party: African National Congress
- Education: University of Pretoria

Mosebenzi Joseph Zwane was the Minister of Mineral Resources of South Africa in the Second Cabinet of former President Jacob Zuma serving from 2015 until 2018. A controversial figure, Zwane resigned on 25 February 2018 following allegations of state capture and in particular his role in the Vrede Dairy Project, which helped bankroll the Gupta Family wedding.

Zwane is currently the chairperson of the parliamentary committee on transport.

== Career ==
Born in Vrede, South Africa, Zwane got involved in political career in the early 1980s as a member of the Thembelihle Youth Congress. He later joined the Thembelihle African National Congress (ANC) branch. He also served in the regional executive committee of the Frankfort region in the early 1990s. He became the first secretary of the Frankfort region that became the Thabo Mofutsunyana region, preceding the amalgamation of local councils.

Zwane became a regional executive committee member of the Thabo Mofutsunyana region and subsequently its chairperson. He has been the regional chairperson of the Thabo Mofutsunyana ANC region since 2006.

Beginning 21 May 2014, Zwane served as a Member of the Free State Legislature (provincial legislature). He previously served as MEC in the Portfolio of Agriculture and Rural Development, Tourism and Environmental Affairs in the Free State provincial government.

On 23 September 2015, Zwane was officially sworn in as Minister of Mineral Resources. He had been appointed by then President Jacob Zuma to succeed Ngoako Ramathlodi.

Zwane attained his secondary teacher's diploma from the South African Teachers College in Pretoria. He also holds a certificate in Executive Leadership Municipal Development from the University of Pretoria.

== Allegations of involvement in State Capture ==
In August 2017, Organisation Undoing Tax Abuse laid charges of treason, corruption, extortion, fraud and theft against Mineral Resources Minister Mosebenzi Zwane in light of his unofficial, unethical and illegal relationship with the Gupta Family.

Zwane‚ charged under the Prevention of Organised Crime Act, was among the first of the known Gupta Family allies to have criminal charges laid against him.

Zwane is accused of allowing the Gupta family to loot nearly R2-billion from South Africa's state coffers via the Vrede Dairy Project and two mine rehabilitation funds.

Zwane is also accused of abusing his position of power as minister to the benefit of the Gupta family and their associates in the landing of their wedding guests at Air Force Base Waterkloof in April 2013.

The Democratic Alliance laid criminal charges include racketeering, money laundering, assisting another to benefit from the proceeds of unlawful activities, and acquiring, possessing or using the proceeds of unlawful activities in terms of the Prevention of Organised Crime Act (No 121 of 1998); and submitting false, or untrue, tax returns in terms of the Tax Administration Act (No 28 of 2011) against Zwane Zwane, Atul Gupta, Ajay Gupta, Rajesh Gupta and their business associates Ronica Ragavan and Kamal Vasram.

In January 2018, the Hawks unit of South Africa's Directorate for Priority Crime Investigation seized R220 million that the Free State Department of Agriculture under Zwane had paid to the Gupta family in connection with the Vrede Dairy Project, calling it a "scheme designed to defraud and steal monies" from the Free State Department of Agriculture.

The UK NGO Shadow World Investigations (formerly Corruption Watch UK) claimed that Mosebenzi Zwane, as MEC for agriculture in the Free State at the time, allegedly received benefits worth R500 000 from Gupta companies a month after a 99-year lease was signed with the Guptas for the Estina farm. The NGO stated it was prepared to testify at the ongoing Zondo Commission.

The fourth part of the Zondo Commission report, released on 29 April 2022, recommended that Zwane be criminally prosecuted for his alleged involvement in corruption.

In October 2023, Zwane was one of four ANC MPs who were absolved by the Joint Committee on Ethics and Members' Interests of breaching the Code of Ethical Conduct and Disclosure of Members' Interests. The committee accepted Zwane's explanation and found that Zackie Achmat's complaint relating to his involvement with the Vrede dairy farm project and for him to be disqualified from Parliament to be unfounded as Zwane was an MEC in the Free State government and not a Member of Parliament.

== See also ==
- Vrede Dairy Project
