= Winkie Direko =

South African politician (1929 - 2012)

Isabella Winkie Direko

Premier of the Free State
- In office 15 June 1999 – 26 April 2004
- Preceded by: Ivy Matsepe-Casaburri
- Succeeded by: Beatrice Marshoff

Personal details
- Born: Isabella Winkie Direko; 27 November 1929 Bochabela, Bloemfontein, Union of South Africa
- Died: 17 February 2012 (aged 82) Bloemfontein, South Africa
- Party: African National Congress
- Education: University of the Free State

Isabella Winkie Direko (27 November 1929 – 17 February 2012) was a South African politician born in the Free State province of South Africa. She was a member of the African National Congress and served as Premier of the Free State from 1999 to 2004.

== Early life ==
Isabella Winkie Direko was born on 27 November 1929 in Bochabela in Bloemfontein. She spent her childhood with her parents at her paternal grandmother's home. Her parents initially resided in Waaihoek before the forced removals in the 1920s. They were then forced to move back to Botshabelo. Her name Winkie was initially her nickname but she later adopted it as her official name. Within political ranks she became known as Ausi Winkie or Mistress Winkie. She spent the later part of her childhood in the Heidedal township of Bloemfontein – predominantly an area for Coloured South Africans.

== Education ==
She started her primary education at the Anglican St. Alban's Church School in Botshabelo and later attended St Patrick's Higher Primary School. Winkie completed her training as a teacher at the Modderpoort Teachers Training Institution near Ladybrand. She then returned to Bloemfontein to take up a teaching post. She worked at Sehunelo High School as a teacher and then moved up the ranks as a deputy-principal and subsequently as the head principal of the school. Direko obtained her Master's in Education degree at the University of the Free State.

== Political career ==
Her political career began in 1977 when she became part of the delegation urging the then Minister of Education, Dr F. Hartzenberg, to allow black African students to register with the University of the Orange Free State; this effort was unsuccessful. Through further negotiations with the ministry, the delegation succeeded in acquiring the establishment of the Vista University in Bloemfontein. The university was established in terms of Act 106 of 1981 and came into existence on 1 January 1982. When appointed Premier, Direko was 70 years old and had only five years' experience in full-time politics. She was sworn in as Premier of the Free State on 15 June 1999.

== Political successes ==
- In 2000, she met with the Public Service Anti-Corruption Unit in Bloemfontein aimed at uprooting corruption in the public sector.
- Direko resisted the merger of the Bloemfontein-based Supreme Court of Appeal and the Constitutional Court, and the relocation of the latter to Gauteng. She explained that this would have stripped Bloemfontein of its treasured title of Judicial Capital.
- In 2001, she allocated R3 million to the Maluti-a-Phofung Local Municipality to alleviate unemployment, improve infrastructure, develop resources and establish an AIDS Council to educate people infected and affected by the disease.

== Honours and memberships ==
- In 1993, Direko was named the Bloemfonteiner of the year.
- She became the 12th President of the National Council of African Women (NCAW) which was established in 1937. This organisation was established after a successful All-African Convention held in Bloemfontein that year.
- Member of the National Council of Provinces from 1994 to 1999
- Member of the Council of Vista University and Chancellor of the University of the Free State
- Played a leading role in the Girl Guides Association of South Africa
- Council member of the NICRO (National Institute for Crime Prevention and the Reintegration of Offenders) and the Child Welfare Organisation
- A building in the Education Faculty at the University of the Free State has been named in her honour.

== Death ==
Direko died on 17 February 2012 after suffering a stroke. She was 82 years old.

Political offices
| Preceded by Ivy Matsepe-Casaburri | Premier of the Free State; 15 June 1999 – 26 April 2004 | Succeeded by Beatrice Marshoff |
