= Premier of the Free State =

Head of government of the Free State province of South Africa

- Incumbent; Maqueen Letsoha-Mathae since 14 June 2024
- Style: The Honourable
- Appointer: Free State Legislature
- Term length: Five years, renewable once
- Inaugural holder: Mosiuoa Lekota
- Formation: 7 May 1994
- Website: www.fs.gov.za/Premiers.htm

The premier of the Free State is the head of government of the Free State province of South Africa. The current premier of the Free State is Maqueen Letsoha-Mathae, who was elected on 14 June 2024. She is a member of the African National Congress.

== Functions ==
The executive authority of a province is entrusted by the Constitution of South Africa in the premier. The premier designates an Executive Council made up of ten members of the provincial legislature. These members of the Executive Council are effectively ministers and the Executive Council a cabinet at the provincial level. The premier can to appoint and dismiss members of the Executive Council at his/her discretion.

The premier and the Executive Council are responsible for implementing provincial legislation, along with any national legislation assigned to the province. They set provincial policy and manage the departments of the provincial government; their actions are subject to the national constitution.

In order for an act of the provincial legislature to become law, the premier must sign it. If the premier believes that the act is unconstitutional, it can be referred back to the legislature for reconsideration. If the premier and the legislature cannot agree, the act must be referred to the Constitutional Court for a final decision.

The premier is also ex officio a member of the National Council of Provinces, the upper house of Parliament, as one of the special delegates from the province.

== List ==
No.	Portrait	Name (Birth–Death)	Term of office			Political party
No.	Portrait	Name (Birth–Death)	Took office	Left office	Time in office	Political party
1		Mosiuoa Lekota (1948–2026)	7 May 1994	18 December 1996	2 years, 225 days	African National Congress
2		Ivy Matsepe-Casaburri (1937–2009)	18 December 1996	15 June 1999	2 years, 179 days	African National Congress
3		Winkie Direko (1929–2012)	15 June 1999	26 April 2004	4 years, 316 days	African National Congress
4		Beatrice Marshoff (1957–2023)	26 April 2004	6 May 2009	5 years, 10 days	African National Congress
5		Ace Magashule (born 1959)	6 May 2009	27 March 2018	8 years, 325 days	African National Congress
6		Sisi Ntombela (born 1957)	27 March 2018	21 February 2023	4 years, 331 days	African National Congress
7		Mxolisi Dukwana (born 1964)	24 February 2023	14 June 2024	1 year, 111 days	African National Congress
8		Maqueen Letsoha-Mathae (born 1969)	14 June 2024	Incumbent	2 years, 103 days	African National Congress

== Election ==
The election for the Free State Provincial Legislature is held every five years, simultaneously with the election of the National Assembly; the last such election occurred on 29 May 2024. At the first meeting of the provincial legislature after an election, the members choose the premier from amongst themselves. The provincial legislature can force the premier to resign by a motion of no confidence. If the premiership becomes vacant (for whatever reason) the provincial legislature must choose a new premier to serve out the period until the next election. One person cannot have served more than two five-year terms as premier; however, when a premier is chosen to fill a vacancy the time until the next election does not count as a term.

== See also ==
- Politics of the Free State
- Premier (South Africa)
- President of South Africa
- Politics of South Africa
