= Beatrice Marshoff =

South African politician (1957–2023)

4th Premier of the Free State
- In office 22 April 2004 – 6 May 2009
- Preceded by: Winkie Direko
- Succeeded by: Ace Magashule

Personal details
- Born: Frances Beatrice Marshoff; 17 September 1957 Bloemfontein, Orange Free State, South Africa
- Died: 15 April 2023 (aged 65) South Africa
- Party: African National Congress
- Education: University of the Free State

Frances Beatrice Marshoff (17 September 1957 – 15 April 2023) was a South African politician who served as Premier of the Free State from 2004 to 2009. She succeeded Winkie Direko to the position on 22 April 2004, and was replaced by Ace Magashule on 6 May 2009.

Beatrice Marshoff was also a registered nurse and also served as a Member of the Executive Council (MEC) for Social Development in the Free State (June 2001 – 21 April 2004). Before that, she was a member of Parliament for the African National Congress (1994–1999).

Marshoff died on 15 April 2023, at the age of 65.

Political offices
| Preceded by Winkie Direko | Premier of the Free State; 26 April 2004 – 6 May 2009 | Succeeded by Ace Magashule |
