= Nthabiseng =

Nthabiseng is a feminine given name. Notable people with the name include:

- Nthabiseng Khunou (born 1969), South African politician
- Nthabiseng Majiya (born 2004), South African footballer
- Nthabiseng Mokoena, South African intersex activist
- Nthabiseng Mokoena (archaeologist), archaeologist and academic
- Nthabiseng Mosia, South African-Ghanaian businessperson
