= Free State (National Assembly of South Africa constituency) =

- Freistata
- Constituency for the National Assembly of South Africa
- Location of Free State within South Africa
- Province: Free State
- Population: 2,928,903 (2020)
- Electorate: 1,462,508 (2019)

Current constituency
- Created: 1994
- Seats: List: 11 (2014–present); 12 (2009–2014); 13 (2004–2009); 14 (–2004)
- Members of the National Assembly: List: Makosini Chabangu (EFF); Dikeledi Direko (ANC); Werner Horn (DA); Thanduxolo Khalipha (ANC); Nomsa Kubheka (ANC); Annelie Lotriet (DA); Dibolelo Mahlatsi (ANC); Nomsa Marchesi (DA); Lawrence McDonald (ANC); Hlengiwe Mkhaliphi (EFF); Madala Ntombela (ANC); Xolisile Qayiso (ANC); Bheki Radebe (ANC); Maggie Sotyu (ANC); Mosebenzi Zwane (ANC)

Free State (Sotho: Freistata) is one of the nine multi-member constituencies of the National Assembly of South Africa, the lower house of the Parliament of South Africa, the national legislature of South Africa. The constituency was established as Orange Free State in 1994 when the National Assembly was established by the Interim Constitution following the end of Apartheid. It was renamed Free State in 1999. It is conterminous with the province of Free State. The constituency currently elects 11 of the 400 members of the National Assembly using the closed party-list proportional representation electoral system. At the 2019 general election it had 1,462,508 registered electors.

== Electoral system ==
Free State currently elects 11 of the 400 members of the National Assembly using the closed party-list proportional representation electoral system. Constituency seats are allocated using the largest remainder method with a Droop quota.

== Election results ==
=== Summary ===
Election	Pan Africanist Congress PAC			United Democratic Movement UDM			African National Congress ANC			Democratic Alliance DA/DP			New National Party NNP/NP			African Christian Democratic Party ACDP			Inkatha Freedom Party IFP			Economic Freedom Fighters EFF			Freedom Front Plus VF+/VFFF/VV-FF		
Election	Votes	%	Seats	Votes	%	Seats	Votes	%	Seats	Votes	%	Seats	Votes	%	Seats	Votes	%	Seats	Votes	%	Seats	Votes	%	Seats	Votes	%	Seats
2024	1,814	0.22%	0	915	0.11%	0	433,797	52.56%	6	177,615	21.52%	2				3,443	0.42%	0	1,686	0.20%	0	115,147	13.95%	2	25,544	3.10%	0
2019	1,359	0.15%	0	1,036	0.11%	0	570,980	62.94%	8	154,686	17.05%	2				4,214	0.46%	0	799	0.09%	0	105,228	11.60%	1	33,660	3.71%	0
2014	1,989	0.19%	0	2,380	0.23%	0	721,126	69.72%	8	167,972	16.24%	2				5,128	0.50%	0	1,177	0.11%	0	81,559	7.89%	1	19,837	1.92%	0
2009	3,003	0.29%	0	3,408	0.32%	0	756,287	71.90%	9	127,259	12.10%	2				7,410	0.70%	0	2,260	0.21%	0				16,929	1.61%	0
2004	13,277	1.30%	0	9,785	0.96%	0	838,583	82.05%	12	90,609	8.87%	1	8,380	0.82%	0	13,488	1.32%	0	4,352	0.43%	0				21,107	2.07%	0
1999	11,300	1.03%	0	18,073	1.65%	0	887,091	81.03%	12	64,262	5.87%	1	54,769	5.00%	1	10,031	0.92%	0	4,938	0.45%	0				19,210	1.75%	0
1994	23,310	1.70%					1,059,313	77.42%		7,365	0.54%		198,780	14.53%		4,523	0.33%		8,446	0.62%					50,386	3.68%	

=== 2024 ===
Results of the regional ballot for the Free State in the 2024 general election held on 29 May 2024:

Party/Candidate	Votes	%	Seats	+/–
African National Congress	433,797	52.56	6	–2
Democratic Alliance	177,615	21.52	2	0
Economic Freedom Fighters	115,147	13.95	2	+1
Freedom Front Plus	25,544	3.10	0	0
uMkhonto weSizwe	18,514	2.24	0	New
Patriotic Alliance	11,838	1.43	0	0
African Transformation Movement	6,591	0.80	0	0
ActionSA	4,823	0.58	0	New
African Content Movement	4,617	0.56	0	0
African Christian Democratic Party	3,443	0.42	0	0
Build One South Africa	3,211	0.39	0	New
Rise Mzansi	2,406	0.29	0	New
#Hope4SA	2,231	0.27	0	New
Congress of the People	1,997	0.24	0	0
Pan Africanist Congress of Azania	1,814	0.22	0	0
Inkatha Freedom Party	1,686	0.20	0	0
United Africans Transformation	1,342	0.16	0	New
Azanian People's Organisation	1,333	0.16	0	0
United Independent Movement	1,170	0.14	0	New
United Democratic Movement	915	0.11	0	0
Alliance of Citizens for Change	904	0.11	0	New
African People's Convention	704	0.09	0	0
South African Royal Kingdoms Organization	556	0.07	0	New
Good	528	0.06	0	0
Abantu Batho Congress	419	0.05	0	New
Louis Liebenberg (independent)	307	0.04	0	New
Economic Liberators Forum South Africa	305	0.04	0	New
Citizans	268	0.03	0	New
Organic Humanity Movement	238	0.03	0	New
National Freedom Party	201	0.02	0	0
South African Rainbow Alliance	195	0.02	0	New
Africa Restoration Alliance	185	0.02	0	New
African Movement Congress	180	0.02	0	New
Free Democrats	154	0.02	0	0
Sizwe Ummah Nation	104	0.01	0	New
Total	825,282	100.00	10	–1
Valid votes	825,282	98.78		
Invalid/blank votes	10,206	1.22		
Total votes	835,488	100.00		
Registered voters/turnout	1,456,927	57.35		

The following candidates were elected.

Name	Party
Dikeledi Direko	ANC
Sello Dithebe	ANC
Karabo Khakhau	DA
Annelie Lotriet	DA
Paulnita Marais	EFF
Matsholo Liesbet Mmolotsane	ANC
Masetshego Mofokeng	ANC
Seiso Mohai	ANC
Fana Mokoena	EFF
Maggie Sotyu	ANC

=== 2019 ===
Results of the national ballot for the Free State in the 2019 general election held on 8 May 2019:

Party	Votes	%	Seats	+/–
African National Congress	570,980	62.94	8	0
Democratic Alliance	154,686	17.05	2	0
Economic Freedom Fighters	105,228	11.60	1	0
Freedom Front Plus	33,660	3.71	0	0
African Transformation Movement	6,100	0.67	0	New
African Christian Democratic Party	4,214	0.46	0	0
Congress of the People	3,790	0.42	0	0
African Independent Congress	3,387	0.37	0	0
Patriotic Alliance	3,383	0.37	0	0
African Democratic Change	3,136	0.35	0	New
Afrikan Alliance of Social Democrats	2,404	0.26	0	New
Socialist Revolutionary Workers Party	1,366	0.15	0	New
Pan Africanist Congress of Azania	1,359	0.15	0	0
African Content Movement	1,308	0.14	0	New
African People's Convention	1,196	0.13	0	0
African Security Congress	1,158	0.13	0	New
United Democratic Movement	1,036	0.11	0	0
Agang South Africa	1,004	0.11	0	0
Azanian People's Organisation	800	0.09	0	0
Inkatha Freedom Party	799	0.09	0	0
Black First Land First	582	0.06	0	New
Good	573	0.06	0	New
Front National	424	0.05	0	0
Power of Africans Unity	397	0.04	0	New
African Covenant	379	0.04	0	New
African Congress of Democrats	361	0.04	0	New
Women Forward	350	0.04	0	0
Capitalist Party of South Africa	306	0.03	0	New
Economic Emancipation Forum	266	0.03	0	New
Alliance for Transformation for All	253	0.03	0	New
Democratic Liberal Congress	223	0.02	0	New
Forum for Service Delivery	223	0.02	0	New
Al Jama-ah	204	0.02	0	0
National Freedom Party	204	0.02	0	0
African Renaissance Unity Party	184	0.02	0	New
Compatriots of South Africa	182	0.02	0	New
Christian Political Movement	144	0.02	0	New
Free Democrats	143	0.02	0	New
South African National Congress of Traditional Authorities	112	0.01	0	New
Better Residents Association	111	0.01	0	0
International Revelation Congress	107	0.01	0	New
Land Party	89	0.01	0	New
Independent Civic Organisation of South Africa	80	0.01	0	0
Minority Front	78	0.01	0	0
People's Revolutionary Movement	78	0.01	0	New
National People's Ambassadors	72	0.01	0	New
National People's Front	55	0.01	0	New
South African Maintenance and Estate Beneficiaries Association	38	0.00	0	New
Total	907,212	100.00	11	–
Valid votes	907,212	98.66		
Invalid/blank votes	12,337	1.34		
Total votes	919,549	100.00		
Registered voters/turnout	1,462,508	62.87		

The following candidates were elected: Dikeledi Direko (ANC), Werner Horn (DA), Thanduxolo Khalipha (ANC), Nomsa Kubheka (ANC), Annelie Lotriet (DA), Dibolelo Mahlatsi (ANC), Lawrence McDonald (ANC), Hlengiwe Mkhaliphi (EFF), Madala Ntombela (ANC), Xolisile Qayiso (ANC) and Bheki Radebe (ANC).

=== 2014 ===
Results of the 2014 general election held on 7 May 2014:

Party		Votes	%	Seats
African National Congress	ANC	721,126	69.72%	8
Democratic Alliance	DA	167,972	16.24%	2
Economic Freedom Fighters	EFF	81,559	7.89%	1
Freedom Front Plus	VF+	19,837	1.92%	0
Congress of the People	COPE	14,613	1.41%	0
African Independent Congress	AIC	7,972	0.77%	0
African Christian Democratic Party	ACDP	5,128	0.50%	0
United Democratic Movement	UDM	2,380	0.23%	0
African People's Convention	APC	2,093	0.20%	0
Agang South Africa	AGANG SA	2,058	0.20%	0
Pan Africanist Congress of Azania	PAC	1,989	0.19%	0
Azanian People's Organisation	AZAPO	1,405	0.14%	0
Inkatha Freedom Party	IFP	1,177	0.11%	0
National Freedom Party	NFP	1,039	0.10%	0
United Christian Democratic Party	UCDP	943	0.09%	0
Patriotic Alliance	PA	543	0.05%	0
Workers and Socialist Party	WASP	393	0.04%	0
Front National	FN	353	0.03%	0
Ubuntu Party	UBUNTU	231	0.02%	0
Independent Civic Organisation of South Africa	ICOSA	226	0.02%	0
Al Jama-ah		208	0.02%	0
Keep It Straight and Simple Party	KISS	203	0.02%	0
Pan Africanist Movement	PAM	187	0.02%	0
Minority Front	MF	152	0.01%	0
Bushbuckridge Residents Association	BRA	131	0.01%	0
First Nation Liberation Alliance	FINLA	120	0.01%	0
United Congress	UNICO	120	0.01%	0
Kingdom Governance Movement	KGM	111	0.01%	0
Peoples Alliance	PAL	68	0.01%	0
Valid Votes		1,034,337	100.00%	11
Rejected Votes		16,690	1.59%	
Total Polled		1,051,027	72.51%	
Registered Electors		1,449,488		

The following candidates were elected: Nomsa Marchesi (DA), Lefu Peter Khoarai (ANC), Nthabiseng Khunou (ANC), Kgotso Zachariah Morapela (EFF), Madala Ntombela (ANC), Bheki Radebe (ANC), Tete Ramalie Jonas Ezekiel Ramokhoase (ANC), David Christie Ross (DA), Maureen Angela Scheepers (ANC), Maggie Sotyu (ANC) and Sibongile Pearm Tsoleli (ANC).

=== 2009 ===
Results of the 2009 general election held on 22 April 2009:

Party		Votes	%	Seats
African National Congress	ANC	756,287	71.90%	9
Democratic Alliance	DA	127,259	12.10%	2
Congress of the People	COPE	116,852	11.11%	1
Freedom Front Plus	VF+	16,929	1.61%	0
African Christian Democratic Party	ACDP	7,410	0.70%	0
Azanian People's Organisation	AZAPO	3,927	0.37%	0
United Democratic Movement	UDM	3,408	0.32%	0
United Christian Democratic Party	UCDP	3,095	0.29%	0
African People's Convention	APC	3,091	0.29%	0
Pan Africanist Congress of Azania	PAC	3,003	0.29%	0
Inkatha Freedom Party	IFP	2,260	0.21%	0
Movement Democratic Party	MDP	1,797	0.17%	0
Independent Democrats	ID	1,786	0.17%	0
Great Kongress of South Africa	GKSA	768	0.07%	0
National Democratic Convention	NADECO	633	0.06%	0
Christian Democratic Alliance	CDA	568	0.05%	0
United Independent Front	UIF	415	0.04%	0
Alliance of Free Democrats	AFD	353	0.03%	0
Al Jama-ah		323	0.03%	0
New Vision Party	NVP	314	0.03%	0
South African Democratic Congress	SADECO	307	0.03%	0
Pan Africanist Movement	PAM	287	0.03%	0
Women Forward	WF	238	0.02%	0
Keep It Straight and Simple Party	KISS	197	0.02%	0
A Party		182	0.02%	0
Minority Front	MF	169	0.02%	0
Valid Votes		1,051,858	100.00%	12
Rejected Votes		17,269	1.62%	
Total Polled		1,069,127	76.99%	
Registered Electors		1,388,588		

The following candidates were elected: Salam Abram (ANC), Faith Claudine Bikani (ANC), Papi Kganare (COPE), Lefu Peter Khoarai (ANC), Nthabiseng Khunou (ANC), Butana Komphela (ANC), Patricia Kopane (DA), Ruth Magau (ANC), Bheki Radebe (ANC), Jacobus Schmidt (DA), Maggie Sotyu (ANC) and Manana Florence Tlake (ANC).

=== 2004 ===
Results of the 2004 general election held on 14 April 2004:

Party		Votes	%	Seats
African National Congress	ANC	838,583	82.05%	12
Democratic Alliance	DA	90,609	8.87%	1
Freedom Front Plus	VF+	21,107	2.07%	0
African Christian Democratic Party	ACDP	13,488	1.32%	0
Pan Africanist Congress of Azania	PAC	13,277	1.30%	0
United Democratic Movement	UDM	9,785	0.96%	0
New National Party	NNP	8,380	0.82%	0
United Christian Democratic Party	UCDP	6,730	0.66%	0
Independent Democrats	ID	6,259	0.61%	0
Inkatha Freedom Party	IFP	4,352	0.43%	0
Azanian People's Organisation	AZAPO	3,450	0.34%	0
Socialist Party of Azania	SOPA	1,129	0.11%	0
National Action	NA	1,071	0.10%	0
Employment Movement for South Africa	EMSA	732	0.07%	0
United Front	UF	685	0.07%	0
Christian Democratic Party	CDP	665	0.07%	0
Peace and Justice Congress	PJC	568	0.06%	0
The Organisation Party	TOP	458	0.04%	0
Keep It Straight and Simple Party	KISS	294	0.03%	0
New Labour Party		240	0.02%	0
Minority Front	MF	182	0.02%	0
Valid Votes		1,022,044	100.00%	13
Rejected Votes		20,076	1.93%	
Total Polled		1,042,120	78.88%	
Registered Electors		1,321,195		

The following candidates were elected: Salam Abram (ANC), Andries Botha (DA), Nthabiseng Khunou (ANC), Butana Komphela (ANC), Maureen Madumise (ANC), Ruth Magau (ANC), Neo Masithela (ANC), Bafunani Mnguni (ANC), Lewele Modisenyane (ANC), Bahlakoana Godfrey Mosala (ANC), Sisi Ntombela (ANC), Bheki Radebe (ANC) and Maggie Sotyu (ANC).

=== 1999 ===
Results of the 1999 general election held on 2 June 1999:

Party		Votes	%	Seats
African National Congress	ANC	887,091	81.03%	12
Democratic Party	DP	64,262	5.87%	1
New National Party	NNP	54,769	5.00%	1
Freedom Front	VFFF	19,210	1.75%	0
United Democratic Movement	UDM	18,073	1.65%	0
Pan Africanist Congress of Azania	PAC	11,300	1.03%	0
African Christian Democratic Party	ACDP	10,031	0.92%	0
Federal Alliance	FA	9,041	0.83%	0
United Christian Democratic Party	UCDP	8,019	0.73%	0
Inkatha Freedom Party	IFP	4,938	0.45%	0
Afrikaner Eenheidsbeweging	AEB	4,228	0.39%	0
Azanian People's Organisation	AZAPO	1,919	0.18%	0
Socialist Party of Azania	SOPA	838	0.08%	0
Abolition of Income Tax and Usury Party	AITUP	421	0.04%	0
Minority Front	MF	351	0.03%	0
Government by the People Green Party	GPGP	285	0.03%	0
Valid Votes		1,094,776	100.00%	14
Rejected Votes		20,550	1.84%	
Total Polled		1,115,326	90.99%	
Registered Electors		1,225,730		

=== 1994 ===
Results of the national ballot for the Free State in the 1994 general election held between 26 and 29 April 1994:

Party	Votes	%	Seats
African National Congress	1,059,313	77.42	12
National Party	198,780	14.53	2
Freedom Front	50,386	3.68	1
Pan Africanist Congress of Azania	23,310	1.70	0
Dikwankwetla Party of South Africa	8,796	0.64	0
Inkatha Freedom Party	8,446	0.62	0
Democratic Party	7,365	0.54	0
African Christian Democratic Party	4,523	0.33	0
African Moderates Congress Party	2,644	0.19	0
Sport Organisation for Collective Contributions and Equal Rights	857	0.06	0
Ximoko Progressive Party	683	0.05	0
African Democratic Movement	553	0.04	0
Federal Party	519	0.04	0
Minority Front	490	0.04	0
Keep It Straight and Simple Party	403	0.03	0
Women's Rights Peace Party	398	0.03	0
Africa Muslim Party	324	0.02	0
Workers' List Party	258	0.02	0
Luso-South African Party	203	0.01	0
Total	1,368,251	100.00	15
Valid votes	1,368,251	98.93	
Invalid/blank votes	14,748	1.07	
Total votes	1,382,999	100.00	
