= Roy Jankielsohn =

South African politician (born 1967)

Roy Jankielsohn MPL

Member of the Free State Provincial Legislature
- Incumbent
- Assumed office December 2006

Leader of the Democratic Alliance in the Free State
- Incumbent
- Assumed office November 2020
- Preceded by: Patricia Kopane
- In office 2006 – September 2012
- Succeeded by: Patricia Kopane

Member of the National Assembly
- In office 12 June 2000 – 1 December 2006
- Constituency: Free State

Personal details
- Born: 3 December 1967 (age 58)
- Citizenship: South Africa
- Party: Democratic Alliance
- Other political affiliations: Democratic Party
- Spouse: Astrid Jankielsohn
- Education: University of the North West (PhD); University of the Free State (PhD)

Roy Jankielsohn (born 3 December 1967) is a South African politician who has been the leader of the opposition in the Free State Provincial Legislature since 2014. He has been the provincial leader of the Democratic Alliance (DA) in the Free State since 2020.

From 2000 to 2006, Jankielsohn represented the DA and Democratic Party in the National Assembly, where he was a member of Tony Leon's shadow cabinet. In December 2006, he joined the Free State Provincial Legislature as leader of the DA caucus, a position he has held since then. He also served an earlier term as DA provincial leader from 2006 to 2012.

== Early career and education ==
Born 3 December 1967, Jankielsohn grew up on a farm near Steynsrus in the former Orange Free State. He holds a PhD in political studies from the University of the North West, and in December 2022, he completed a second PhD at the University of the Free State (UFS) – his sixth degree in total – with a dissertation on the governance of animal custodianship.

Jankielsohn was formerly a lecturer at UFS. He entered politics in 1995, when he stood for the Democratic Party (DP) as a candidate for election as a ward councillor in Bloemfontein, but he remained active in academia as a peer reviewer and member of the advisory board at his former UFS department. He also holds the rank of captain in an armoured reserve force unit of the South African National Defence Force.

== National Assembly: 2000–2006 ==
Jankielsohn joined the National Assembly on 12 June 2000, filling a casual vacancy in the DP's Free State caucus. As a member of the DP's federal council, he was involved in negotiations to establish the Democratic Alliance (DA), which originated as a multi-party opposition coalition. In March 2001, he was appointed to the shadow cabinet of DA leader Tony Leon, who appointed Jankielsohn to replace Nic Clelland as his parliamentary counsellor.

In the 2004 general election, Jankielsohn was ranked second on the DA's party regional party list for the Free State. He was re-elected and, now alongside Sandra Botha, continued as one of the party's two representatives in the Free State caucus. Also in 2004, he was elected as the chairperson of the Free State branch of the DA. In addition, he remained in Leon's shadow cabinet, now as spokesperson on safety and security; in that capacity, he was a prominent critic of Minister Charles Nqakula. In a reshuffle in July 2006, he was moved to a new portfolio as spokesperson on defence.

Later in 2006, upon the conclusion of his term as DA provincial chairperson, Jankielsohn was elected as provincial leader of the DA in the Free State. In the aftermath, on 1 December 2006, he resigned from his seat in the National Assembly in order to take up a seat in the Free State Provincial Legislature; he swopped seats with former provincial legislator Andries Botha.

== Free State Legislature: 2006–present ==
=== DA caucus leader: 2006–present ===
Jankielsohn entered the Free State Provincial Legislature as leader of the DA's caucus in the province. Re-elected to a second term in the provincial legislature in 2009, he continued to serve as caucus leader even after September 2012, when he was succeeded as DA provincial leader by Patricia Kopane; because Kopane served in the National Assembly, he was allowed to retain his position at the head of the party in the provincial legislature.

In the 2014 general election, the DA ousted the Congress of the People as the official opposition in the Free State Provincial Legislature, with a record five seats in the chamber. As Kopane remained in the National Assembly, Jankielsohn continued as the party's caucus leader and therefore became official leader of the opposition in the province, assisted by caucus chairperson James Letuka. Jankielsohn has retained that position since 2014, as the DA remained the official opposition after the 2019 general election.

As leader of the opposition, Jankielsohn continued a campaign he had taken up earlier to attract the attention of law enforcement to alleged maladministration of the Vrede Dairy Project. He submitted three related complaints to the Public Protector between 2013 and 2016 and later testified about the project before the Zondo Commission.

=== DA provincial leader: 2020–present ===
In 2020, Kopane announced that she would not seek re-election to another term as DA provincial leader. At the party's provincial elective congress in November that year, Jankielsohn was elected to return to his former office to succeed her. He was re-elected unopposed in January 2023.

On 11 August 2023, Jankielsohn was announced as the DA's Free State Premier candidate for the 2024 provincial election.

== Personal life ==
He is married to Astrid Jankielsohn, who is an entomologist. They have one son and live on a farm outside Bethlehem, Free State.
