= Mike Waters (politician) =

South African politician

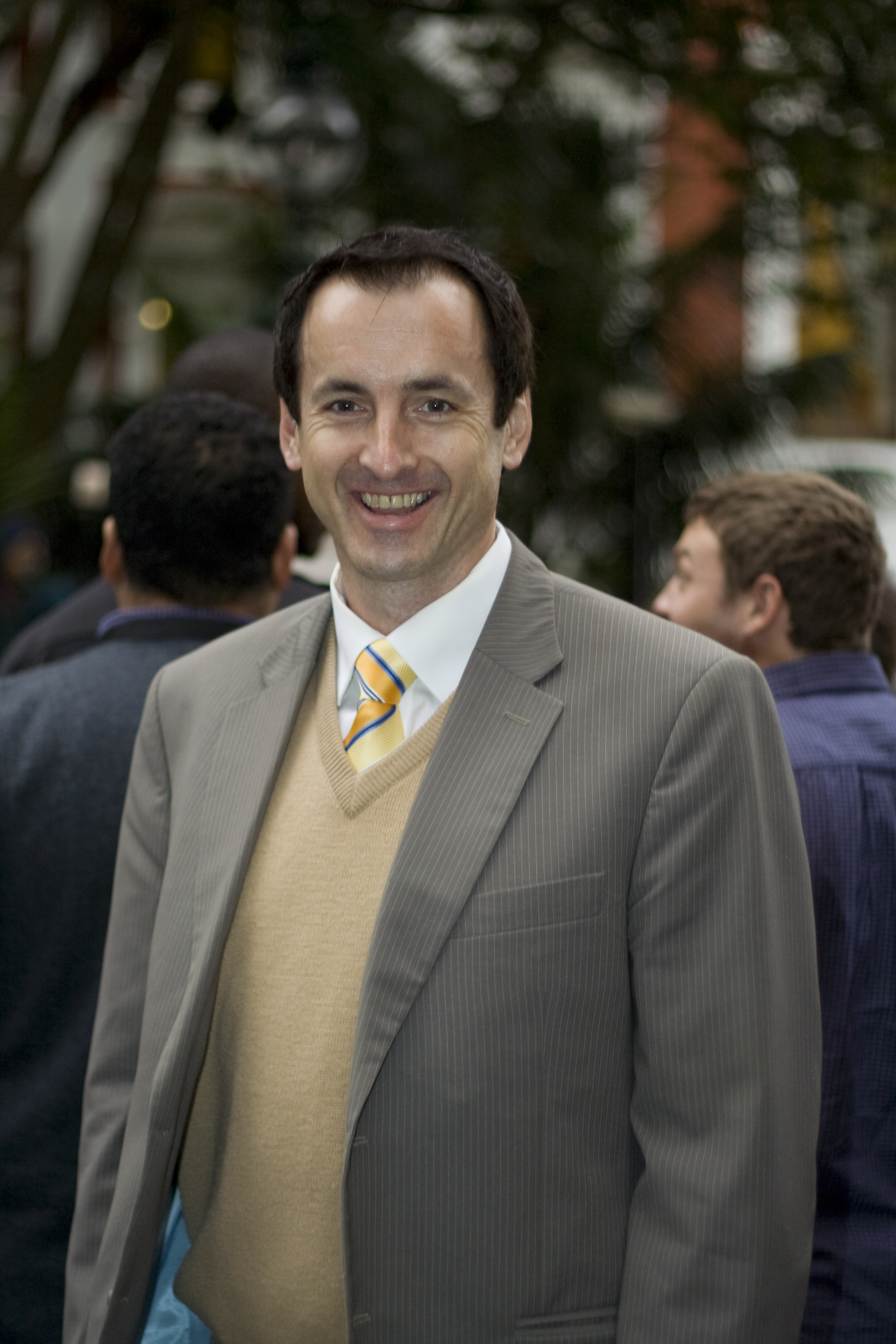

Deputy Chief Whip of the Official Opposition
- In office 29 May 2014 – 30 May 2019
- Leader: Mmusi Maimane
- Preceded by: Sandy Kalyan
- Succeeded by: Jacques Julius

Shadow Minister of Social Development
- In office 1 February 2012 – 29 May 2014
- Leader: Lindiwe Mazibuko
- Preceded by: Patricia Kopane
- Succeeded by: Patricia Kopane

Shadow Minister of Health
- In office July 2006 – 1 February 2012
- Leader: Tony Leon; Sandra Botha; Athol Trollip; Lindiwe Mazibuko
- Preceded by: Gareth Morgan
- Succeeded by: Patricia Kopane

Member of the National Assembly of South Africa
- In office 14 June 1999 – 19 February 2021

Personal details
- Born: Michael Waters; 30 June 1967 (age 59) Middlesbrough, United Kingdom
- Party: Democratic Alliance (2000–present)
- Other political affiliations: Democratic (1989–2000)
- Education: Technikon Witwatersrand

Mike Waters (born 30 June 1967) is a South African politician, and former Member of Parliament for the opposition Democratic Alliance (DA), where he served as the Opposition's Deputy Chief Whip from 2014 to 2019. He served as the Shadow Minister of Health from 2006 to 2012, and as the Shadow Minister of Social Development from 2012 to 2014.

== Early life ==
Waters was born in the United Kingdom in 1967. He and his family migrated to South Africa in 1972. Waters attended Bedfordview High School before attaining a diploma in human resources from Technikon Witwatersrand. He joined the Democratic Party in 1989, and became president of the DP National Youth in 1994.

== Political career ==
Waters began his professional political career on the Kempton Park town council, winning a landmark by-election against the National Party in 1997. He was elected to Parliament in 1999, and subsequently was appointed DA spokesperson on Child Abuse. In 2004 he became Social Development spokesperson. He succeeded Gareth Morgan as Shadow Health Minister in 2006, a position he held until 2012, when he was appointed as Shadow Minister of Social Development by the newly elected DA parliamentary leader, Lindiwe Mazibuko.

After he was re-elected to parliament in 2014, he was a candidate for deputy chief whip of the DA caucus. He defeated incumbent Sandy Kalyan in a vote that went 63 to 36. At the 2015 Democratic Alliance Federal Congress, Waters was elected as one of three federal chairpersons of the DA. Waters was a senior member of Ghaleb Cachalia's unsuccessful campaign to unseat John Moodey as the provincial leader of the DA in Gauteng in 2017. He was re-elected for a second term as a federal chairperson in 2018.

Following his re-election to parliament in 2019, he ran for re-election as deputy chief whip, but was defeated by Jacques Julius. He then refused to be appointed to the DA's shadow cabinet. In June 2019, James Selfe announced that he would be retiring as the chairperson of the DA's Federal Council. Waters subsequently declared that he was a candidate to replace him. He said that the party needed to return to its "core values" and that former party leader Helen Zille should be allowed back into the party's leadership. He received few votes and finished last in a vote on 20 October 2019, which Zille won.

In September 2020, John Moodey resigned from the party after he allegedly colluded with senior DA councillors in the Ekurhuleni Metropolitan Municipality to frame Waters in an alleged sex-for-jobs scandal. Waters accused Moodey of trying to "destroy" his reputation and political career. He also vowed legal action against him. Waters stood down as a federal chairperson at the DA's Federal Congress in November 2020.

On 19 February 2021, Waters resigned from parliament, saying that "being an MP has been the greatest honour of my life." According to close confidants, he had lately contemplated resigning and gave no official reason when he resigned. He thanked the DP, the DA, and the voters of Kempton Park and Edenvale for their support. In June 2021, Waters was appointed as the DA's Gauteng East Campaign Manager for the 2021 local government elections. He resigned from the post on 11 October after the DA decided to take down its controversial election posters in Phoenix, KwaZulu-Natal. Waters was in support of the message and criticised the party for its decision to backtrack on supporting the controversial posters. He said in his resignation letter that he was "shocked and horrified" by the party's weakness.

== Policy issues ==
=== AIDS policy ===
Waters has been a vocal critic of the African National Congress's health policies, particularly those of controversial former health minister Manto Tshabalala-Msimang.

=== Child abuse ===
As the DA's spokesperson on child abuse, Waters visited all 45 child protection units in South Africa during 2002. The following year he visited all 48 sexual offences units. He was vocally critical of the ruling ANC's decision to disband the amalgamated Family Violence, Child Protection and Sexual Offences units in 2006.

=== National Health Insurance ===
Waters has publicly criticised the ANC's proposed national health insurance scheme. He has labeled the plan anti-poor and irresponsible:

As always, the poor will be hardest hit, because the NHI does nothing to address the crisis in public health care. That crisis has been caused by a shortage of nurses and doctors, inadequate facilities and resources, and weak management systems. The poor bear the brunt of it. The NHI is not pro-poor. In fact it is anti-poor. It is a sure-fire recipe for the destruction of public health care.

== Personal life ==
Waters is openly gay.

== Offices held ==
Political offices
Preceded by Gareth Morgan	South African Shadow Minister of Health; 2009-2012	Succeeded by Patricia Kopane
