= Dianne Kohler Barnard =

South African politician

Dianne Kohler Barnard MP
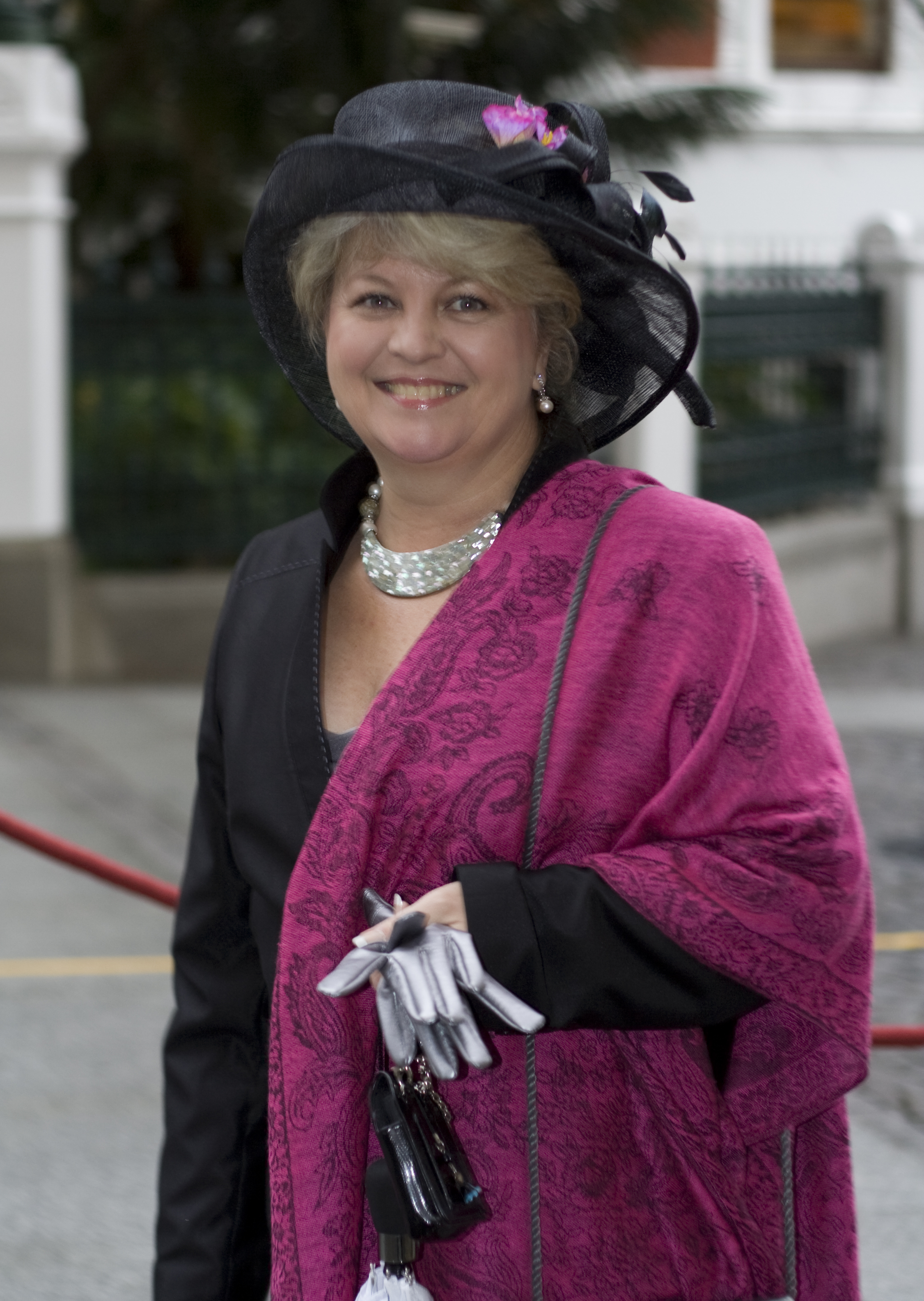

Shadow Minister of Police
- In office 2006–2015
- Leader: Tony Leon; Helen Zille; Mmusi Maimane
- Succeeded by: Zakhele Mbhele

Shadow Minister of Health
- In office 2005–2006
- Leader: Tony Leon

Shadow Minister of Arts and Culture
- In office 2004–2005
- Leader: Tony Leon

Member of Parliament for KwaZulu-Natal
- Incumbent
- Assumed office 21 May 2004

Personal details
- Born: 2 December 1955 (age 70) Port Elizabeth, Cape Province, Union of South Africa
- Party: Democratic Alliance

Dianne Kohler Barnard is a South African politician and former journalist, and a Member of Parliament for the Democratic Alliance (DA). In October 2015, she was expelled from the party by the DA Federal Executive. In December 2015, the decision was lifted on appeal to the DA's Federal Legal Commission.

She was born in Port Elizabeth, and currently resides in KwaZulu-Natal, where she represents the Durban South constituency.

== Career in journalism ==
Kohler Barnard spent 23 years working as a radio and print journalist. She ran the KwaZulu-Natal offices of SAfm and also presented/produced the station's afternoon news programme The Editors.

Kohler Barnard is also the former chairperson of the Broadcast, Electronic Media and Allied Workers' Union in KwaZulu-Natal, and was a founder member of the inaugural SABC HIV/Aids Committee.

== Politics ==
Kohler Barnard moved to politics in response to increasing state interference in the management of the SABC. She was elected to parliament with the DA in 2004, and was initially spokesperson on Arts and Culture.

She was subsequently appointed opposition spokesperson on Health, and was a vocal critic of incumbent Health Minister Manto Tshabalala-Msimang, particularly over her support for controversial German vitamin salesman Matthias Rath. Rath attempted to sue Kohler Barnard for describing him as a "charlatan", and also tried to sue newspapers that carried the remark.

Subsequently, Kohler Barnard was appointed as Shadow Minister of Police. She was also the DA's representative on the SADC observer mission to Zimbabwe for the last two elections in that country.

Following a scandal (see below), she was shifted to the position of deputy spokesperson on Public Works in 2015. She was returned to the Police portfolio, but this time as Deputy Shadow Minister, in August 2017.

Having previously served as Shadow Minister of Communications and Digital Technologies, Kohler Barnard was appointed Shadow Minister of State Security on 21 April 2023.

== Controversies ==
Kohler Barnard was almost expelled from the DA in October 2015, when it emerged that she had controversially shared on her Facebook page a post from someone else suggesting that life in South Africa was better under former apartheid President PW Botha. She deleted it after it was on her page overnight. It appeared on Twitter as shared by the ANC some weeks later. DA leader Helen Zille told Kohler Barnard to delete the post, although at that point she had already did so. Kohler Barnard apologised for her action, and was subsequently demoted to the position of shadow Deputy Minister of Public Works.

New DA party leader Mmusi Maimane came under pressure to expel her from the party. The disciplinary panel apparently recommended that Kohler Barnard be fined R20,000, be removed from all internally elected DA positions, pay for public apologies in 5 newspapers and attend a social media management course at her own expense. Following this, Kohler Barnard's membership of the DA was terminated by the DA Federal Executive. She then appealed the decision to the DA Federal Legal Commission, as a result of which her expulsion was suspended for a period of 5 years.

The controversy was alleged to harm the image of the DA, which has been trying to project itself as an anti-apartheid party, and also caused some serious internal tension, as some have viewed the original decisions as harsh.

A media report in 2016 indicated that Kohler Barnard may not have complied with all of the various sanctions placed on her by the due date.

In 2025, KwaZulu-Natal Police Commissioner Nhlanhla Mkhwanazi made allegations that Kohler Barnard had leaked classified Crime Intelligence information.

== Offices held ==
Political offices
Preceded by	South African Shadow Minister of State Security; 2023–present	Succeeded by Incumbent
Preceded by	South African Shadow Minister of Communications and Digital Technologies; 2020–2022	Succeeded by
Preceded by James Masango	South African Shadow Deputy Minister of Public Works; 2015–2020	Succeeded by
Preceded by Roy Jankielsohn	South African Shadow Minister of Police; 2006–2015	Succeeded by Zakhele Mbhele
Preceded by Ryan Coetzee	South African Shadow Minister of Health; 2005–2006	Succeeded by Gareth Morgan
Preceded by Sydney Opperman	South African Shadow Minister of Arts and Culture; 2004–2005	Succeeded by Desiree van der Walt
