= Direko =

Direko is a surname. Notable people with this surname include:

- Dikeledi Direko (born 1985), South African politician
- Redi Tlhabi (née Direko; born 1978), South African journalist
- Winkie Direko (1929–2012), South African politician
