= Dikeledi =

Dikeledi is a feminine given name. Notable people with this name include:

- Dikeledi Direko (born 1985), South African politician
- Dikeledi Magadzi, South African politician
- Dikeledi Mahlangu, South African politician
- Dikeledi Moropane (born 1976), South African sprinter
- Dikeledi Tsotetsi (born 1956), South African politician
