= Gareth Morgan (South African politician) =

South African politician (born 1977)

Gareth Morgan MP
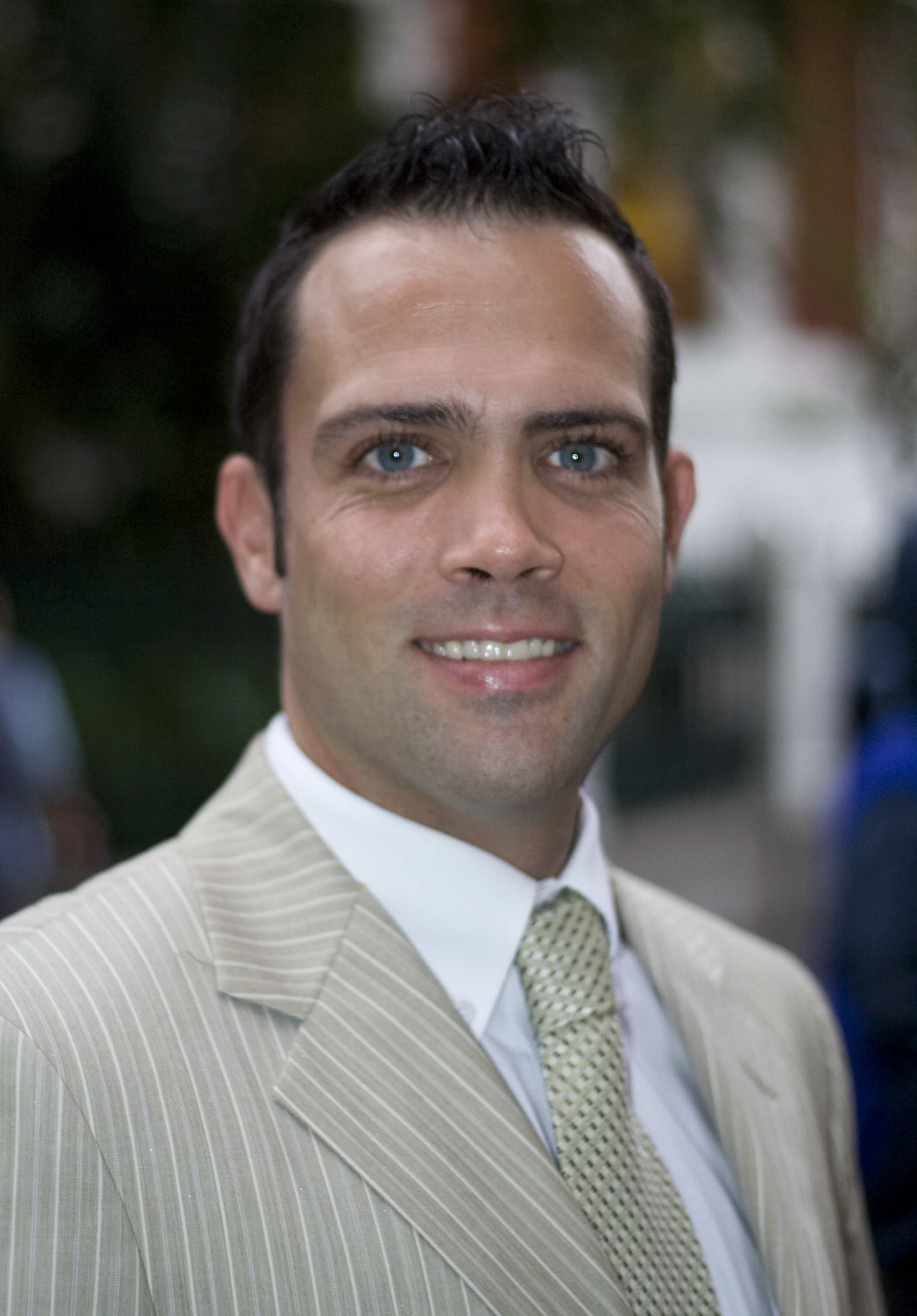

Shadow Minister of Water and Environmental Affairs
- In office 2007–2013
- Leader: Helen Zille
- Preceded by: Rafeek Shah

Shadow Minister of Health
- In office 2006–2007
- Leader: Tony Leon and Helen Zille
- Preceded by: Dianne Kohler Barnard

Shadow Minister of Environmental Affairs and Tourism
- In office 2005–2006
- Leader: Tony Leon
- Preceded by: Mike Ellis

Counsellor to the Leader of the Opposition
- In office 2004–2005
- Leader: Tony Leon

Member of Parliament for West Durban, KwaZulu-Natal in the National Assembly of South Africa
- In office 14 May 2004 – 5 February 2013

Personal details
- Born: 22 March 1977 (age 49) Cape Town
- Party: Democratic Alliance
- Education: University of Natal and Oxford University

Gareth Morgan (born 22 March 1977) is a South African politician and a former member of parliament with the opposition Democratic Alliance. He is a former Rhodes Scholar at Oxford, and previously worked as South Africa's Shadow Minister of Water and Environmental Affairs. He was South Africa's first carbon neutral Member of Parliament. He resigned from office in January 2013 to pursue a career in consulting before joining the City of Cape Town as Principal Trade and Investment Officer in June 2015.

== Education ==
Morgan matriculated from Westville Boys' High School in 1994 and completed a B.Com and political science honours degree at the University of Natal. He joined the Democratic Alliance's predecessor, the Democratic Party, in 1995—as a student activist. In 1999 he became the party's media officer in KwaZulu-Natal. After a brief stint as a high school teacher, Morgan read for a PPE degree and an M.Sc in Environmental Change and Management at Oxford—on a Rhodes Scholarship.

== Member of Parliament ==
Upon his return to South Africa, Morgan was elected to the National Assembly on the DA's KwaZulu-Natal list. He was initially appointed Parliamentary Counsellor to the Leader of the Opposition—a position he occupied for 14 months. He subsequently was appointed spokesperson on Environmental Affairs. In July 2006 he became health spokesperson, before returning to the Environmental Affairs portfolio. Ahead of the 2009 General Elections he appeared second on the party's KwaZulu-Natal list and was re-elected. He served as Shadow Minister of Water and Environmental Affairs from 2009 to January 2013 and was a whip of the National Assembly from June 2011 until his resignation.

== Constituency ==
Morgan served as Democratic Alliance MP for the Abaqulusi constituency in northern KwaZulu-Natal between 2004 and 2006. Between 2006 and 2008 he served the South Durban constituency, and from 2009 to January 2013 he served as constituency MP for Durban West.

== Memberships ==
Morgan was a member of Globe International's G8+5 Climate Dialogue from 2006 to 2013.

He is also a fellow of the Emerging Leaders' Programme run by the Southern Africa Centre for Leadership and Public Values.

== Offices held ==
Political offices
Preceded by Rafeek Shah	South African Shadow Minister of Water and Environmental Affairs; 2007 - 2013	Succeeded by Marti Wenger
Preceded by Dianne Kohler Barnard	South African Shadow Minister of Health; 2006 – 2007	Succeeded by Mike Waters
Preceded by Mike Ellis	South African Shadow Deputy Minister of Environmental Affairs and Tourism; 2004 – 2006	Succeeded by Rafeek Shah
