= Lawrence McDonald =

Lawrence McDonald may refer to:

- Larry McDonald (1935–1983), American politician and member of the United States House of Representatives
- Larry McDonald (percussionist) (born 1939), Caribbean percussionist
- Lawrence G. McDonald, former vice-president at Lehman Brothers
- Lawrence McDonald (South African politician), member of the National Assembly of South Africa
