= Ayn Carrillo Gailey =

American writer, editor and publisher

- Born: Ann Marie Carrillo; Taipei, Taiwan
- Education: University of California, Los Angeles (BA, MFA); Harvard University
- Occupations: Writer; producer; publisher
- Years active: 2000–present
- Spouse: Samuel W. Gailey
- Children: 1 (daughter)
- Website: Website

Ayn Carrillo Gailey is an American writer, editor and publisher. She is the author of Pornology (2007), published by Running Press Book Publishers in the U.S., and known in the UK under the title Good Vibrations, published by Random House. Her television credits include Dead Man's Gun for Showtime, The Visitor. CaliWood Pictures and Affirmative Entertainment purchased the rights to the book Pornology and began shooting the adaptation in 2018, under the title A Nice Girl Like You, starring Lucy Hale and Jackie Cruz. The movie was released in May 2020.

== Early life ==
Ayn Carrillo Gailey was born Ann Marie Carrillo in Taipei, Taiwan to a Chinese mother and Mexican-American father (whose ancestors descended from the extinct Karankawa tribe) who was in the U.S. military. Her family moved to the United States shortly after her birth.

Due to her father's position in the Navy, the family moved frequently, including stints in Corpus Christi, Texas and San Diego, California, as well as two years in Izmir, Turkey, where she spent part of middle school and high school. She earned a BA in psychology from UCLA, a master's in education and social policy from Harvard University, and a MFA in screenwriting from UCLA Graduate School of Theatre & Television.

== Career ==
Her first screenwriting job was in 1998, for the television show Dead Man's Gun on Showtime. She was nominated for an Outstanding Drama Script by the Writers Guild of Canada with co-writer and future husband Samuel W. Gailey.

Her first feature scripts were written for Centropolis, the company founded by Roland Emmerich and Dean Devlin. None of the scripts were produced, however she did write for the company's Fox TV Show, The Visitor. She wrote the bi-cultural relationship column Sex y LA for three years for Tu Ciudad magazine, a sister magazine to Los Angeles Magazine, published by Emmis, until the magazine was ended during the Great Recession. She published the non-fiction book Pornology in 2007 in the U.S., UK, and Asia.

During her time in Los Angeles she also worked as a writer/content editor for brands and in PR and helped write the New York Times bestselling memoir House of Nails by baseball legend Lenny Dykstra. CaliWood Pictures and Affirmative Entertainment purchased the rights to the book Pornology and began shooting the adaptation in 2018, under the title A Nice Girl Like You, starring Lucy Hale (Pretty Little Liars, Fantasy Island) and Jackie Cruz, Leonidas Gulaptis, Adhir Kalyan, and Mindy Cohn. In December 2019, she published the coffee table book Ōde, under the publishing house, St. Ōde Press, she co-founded with Sara Cunningham Farish. Her original writing appears throughout the book alongside award-winning writers.

She is a founding board member of Orcas Island Lit Fest and Novel Lab, a free workshop for teen novelists. Her writing has also appeared in Cosmopolitan Magazine, Latina Magazine, Alegria Magazine, Elle Magazine and Kinfolk Magazine's coffee table book series. She is currently working on her first novel and the second volume of Ōde.

== Personal life ==
Ayn Carrillo Gailey is married to novelist Samuel W. Gailey. They reside in Eastsound, Washington and have one daughter (creator of Girl Folk).
