= A Nice Girl Like You =

Film directed by Chris and Nick Riedell

- Film poster
- Directed by: Chris Riedell; Nick Riedell
- Screenplay by: Andrea Marcellus
- Based on: Pornology by Ayn Carrillo Gailey
- Produced by: Jina Panebianco; Nicholas Bogner; Melanie Greene
- Starring: Lucy Hale; Leonidas Gulaptis; Mindy Cohn; Adhir Kalyan; Jackie Cruz
- Cinematography: Nico Van den Berg
- Edited by: Jeffrey J. Castelluccio
- Music by: Aaron Zigman
- Production companies: SPR Media; CaliWood Pictures; Affirmative Entertainment
- Distributed by: Vertical Entertainment
- Release date: July 17, 2020
- Running time: 94 minutes
- Country: United States
- Language: English
- Budget: $2.3 million
- Box office: $771,222

A Nice Girl Like You is a 2020 American romantic comedy film directed by the Riedell Brothers (Chris and Nick Riedell), from a screenplay by Andrea Marcellus, based on the 2007 memoir Pornology by Ayn Carrillo Gailey. The film stars Lucy Hale and Leonidas Gulaptis.

The film was released video on demand on July 17, 2020, by Vertical Entertainment.

== Plot ==
Lucy Neal disappoints her boyfriend Jeff with her lack of intimacy. While he is asleep, Lucy looks at Jeff’s laptop and finds that he watches porn. They argue this and then break up, with Jeff moving out of the apartment.

Lucy, with her string quartet, also comprising Nessa, Priscilla, and Paul, performs at a wedding, but she breaks down in the middle of it and tells them that Jeff left her because she won’t satisfy him. After some comforting and encouragement from the three, Lucy decides to make a sex list of things to improve her intimacy problems.

When Lucy is at another wedding, she gets drunk and begins to yell by herself in frustration at not being able to use the word cock in a sentence. She is overheard by a wedding guest, Grant. He comes in to comfort her and helps her get back outside after some friendly chatting.

Lucy starts off with her list by first watching a lot of porn at home and also reads a very racy novel. The next morning, Nessa and Priscilla come over to help Lucy get over Jeff, but she instead invites them to go to a sex store. Lucy bumps into Grant there, they chat some more and she finds herself attracted to him.

The same night, Lucy joins Paul at a strip club he visits regularly. She finds herself impressed by the dancing onstage, but when she sees that all she has is a $20 bill for a tip, Lucy awkwardly tries to take change from the dancer, which gets her and Paul kicked out.

At another event where Lucy's quartet is performing, she again sees Grant. He asks Lucy to dance. Then later, Grant asks her out to dinner which she accepts.

Lucy goes on her dinner date with Grant, and they later attend a live taping for talk show host Dr. Becker as Priscilla gave Lucy tickets. A guest on the show is sex expert Madame Swarovska, who brings Lucy up to speak with her. She senses the lack of sexual experience in her and basically encourages Grant to show her a good time.

On another night, Lucy meets up with Grant again where they hook up and have good sex. In the morning, he is put off when he sees the amount of sexual paraphernalia in her room, along with pregnancy pants that she had bought purely for comfort. Freaked out, Grant ends up leaving, which Lucy sees. She is embarrassed and throws away all the sex stuff.

Lucy practices for her audition. She tries but doesn’t feel at her best. Lucy later discovers that Jeff is getting married and that he wants the group to perform at the wedding. When they find out it pays well, Lucy agrees.

At a bar, Paul signs Lucy up for a talent show, so she plays the violin with the house band. Grant finds her there, they reconcile and hook back up. Grant explains that earlier he freaked out because he thought Lucy was pregnant when he found the pregnancy pants.

Lucy gets a message that she was not selected for the Philharmonic, but she doesn’t care because she’s happy with Grant. At Jeff's wedding, Lucy hires porn star Honey to meet Jeff as her wedding present, knowing he is a fan. He freaks out, running off to the dance floor. After Lucy thanks Honey, Honey then goes to dance with Paul. Lucy goes back to find Grant, so that she can try the last item on the list with him.

== Cast ==
- Lucy Hale as Lucy Neal
- Leonidas Gulaptis as Grant Anderson
- Jackie Cruz as Nessa Jennings
- Mindy Cohn as Priscilla Blum
- Adhir Kalyan as Paul Goodwin
- Stephen Friedrich as Jeff Thayer
- Leah McKendrick as Honey Parker
- Tori Piskin as Annie's bride

== Production ==
Principal photography on the film began on October 23 and ended on November 15, 2018.

== Release ==
In June 2020, Vertical Entertainment acquired distribution rights to the film and set it for a July 17, 2020, release.

== Reception ==
On Metacritic, the film has a score of 41% based on reviews from 5 critics, indicating "mixed or average" reviews. On Rotten Tomatoes, it has an approval rating of 10% based on 10 reviews, with an average rating of 3.9/10.
