= Bahlakoana Mosala =

South African politician

Member of the National Assembly
- In office 23 April 2004 – May 2009
- Constituency: Free State

Personal details
- Born: Bahlakoana Godfrey Mosala; 3 April 1934 (age 92)
- Citizenship: South Africa
- Party: African National Congress

Bahlakoana Godfrey Mosala (born 3 April 1934) is a South African politician who represented the Free State constituency in the National Assembly from 2004 to 2009. A member of the African National Congress, he was elected in the 2004 general election, ranked tenth on the party's regional list for the Free State. He did not stand for re-election in 2009.
