= Xolisile Qayiso =

South African politician

Member of the National Assembly of South Africa
- In office 22 May 2019 – 28 May 2024
- Constituency: Free State

Personal details
- Born: Xolisile Shinars Qayiso; 8 February 1962 (age 64)
- Party: African National Congress
- Profession: Politician

Xolisile Shinars Qayiso (born 8 February 1962) is a South African politician and a former member of the National Assembly of South Africa. He is a member of the African National Congress.

== Early life and education ==
Qayiso was born on February 8, 1962. He started school at Byelkanderkoms Primary School in Bloemfontein West in 1972 and matriculated from Moemedi High School in 1984. After a year of training and receiving a certificate, he was employed as an enrolled nursing assistant. He then did some short courses at the University of South Africa and earned a certificate in knowledge management. Qayiso is currently fulfilling a course on Basic Principle of Labour Law at the University of the Free State.

== Politics ==
As a trade unionist, Qayiso was a member of National Education, Health and Allied Workers' Union and a shop steward. He was the provincial treasurer of NEHAWU at one stage. He also served as the provincial chairperson and as the deputy provincial chairperson of the Congress of South African Trade Unions (COSATU) in the Free State.

Qayiso was also a branch office bearer and worked as a regional paralegal coordinator. He was a member of the Mangaung Advice Centre in the early 1990s.

Qayiso joined the African National Congress in 1992 and later the South African Communist Party. He was a branch executive member tasked with political education. He is currently a member of the provincial executive committee of the ANC.

=== Parliament ===
Qayiso stood as an ANC parliamentary candidate from the Free State in the 2019 national elections, and was subsequently elected to the National Assembly and sworn in on 22 May 2019.

In parliament, he was a member of the Joint Standing Committee on Financial Management of Parliament and the Standing Committee on Appropriations.

He did not seek reelection in 2024 and left parliament.
