= Durban North (House of Assembly of South Africa constituency) =

- Durban-Noord
- Former constituency for the South African House of Assembly
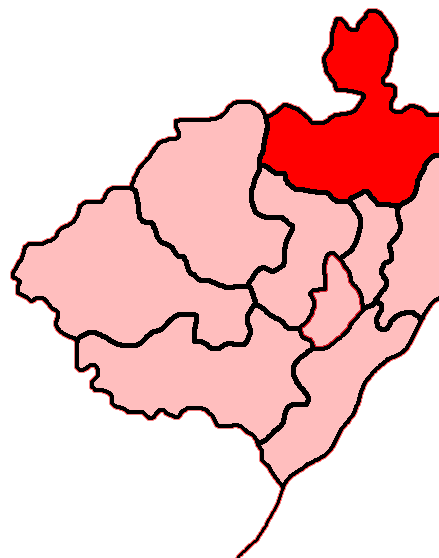
- Location of Durban North within Durban (1981)
- Province: Natal
- Electorate: 19,000 (1989)

Former constituency
- Created: 1938
- Abolished: 1994
- Number of members: 1
- Last MHA: Mike Ellis (DP)
- Created from: Durban District
- Replaced by: KwaZulu-Natal

Durban North (Afrikaans: Durban-Noord) was a constituency in the Natal Province of South Africa, which existed from 1938 to 1994. As the name implies, it covered the northern suburbs of Durban. Throughout its existence it elected one member to the House of Assembly.

== Franchise notes ==
When the Union of South Africa was formed in 1910, the electoral qualifications in use in each pre-existing colony were kept in place. The franchise used in the Natal Colony, while theoretically not restricted by race, was significantly less liberal than that of the Cape, and no more than a few hundred non-white electors ever qualified. In 1908, an estimated 200 of the 22,786 electors in the colony were of non-European descent, and by 1935, only one remained. By 1958, when the last non-white voters in the Cape were taken off the rolls, Natal too had an all-white electorate. The franchise was also restricted by property and education qualifications until the 1933 general election, following the passage of the Women's Enfranchisement Act, 1930 and the Franchise Laws Amendment Act, 1931. From then on, the franchise was given to all white citizens aged 21 or over, which remained the case until the end of apartheid and the introduction of universal suffrage in 1994.

== History ==
Like the rest of Durban, Durban North was a largely English-speaking seat. It was initially a safe seat for the Labour Party, and its first MP was former Army chaplain Cecil Frank Miles-Cadman. He was re-elected in 1943, helped by a pact with the United Party that resulted in him facing only independent opposition, but on his retirement in 1948, the UP took the seat. They would hold it until 1976, with only two MPs, Jack Lewis and Michael Lloyd Mitchell. Mitchell left Parliament in 1976, resulting in a dramatic three-cornered by-election that saw the UP's candidate defeated by Selwyn Anthony Pitman of the Progressive Reform Party, which had formed just a few months earlier as a merger of the Progressive Party with a liberal faction of the UP led by Harry Schwarz.

Between then and the 1977 general election, the UP collapsed, with another liberal faction joining with the PRP to form the new Progressive Federal Party, while the more conservative members of the party formed the New Republic Party. In Natal, unlike the rest of the country, the NRP was the stronger of the two factions, and defeated Pitman at the 1977 election. In 1981, Pitman moved to the neighbouring Pinetown seat and won, while NRP MP Ronald Miller was re-elected in Durban North. However, the NRP was already in decline by then, and Miller jumped ship to the governing National Party before the next election in 1987. In that year, despite a generally poor result across South Africa, the PFP retook Durban North with Mike Ellis, who would go on to become one of South Africa's longest-serving MPs, representing Durban North until its abolition in 1994 and then the KwaZulu-Natal provincial constituency until 2011.

== Members ==
Election	Member	Party
1938	C. F. Miles-Cadman	Labour
1943	C. F. Miles-Cadman	Labour
1948	Jack Lewis	United
1953	Jack Lewis	United
1958	Jack Lewis	United
1961	M. L. Mitchell	United
1966	M. L. Mitchell	United
1970	M. L. Mitchell	United
1974	M. L. Mitchell	United
1976 by	S. A. Pitman	PRP
1977	R. B. Miller	NRP
1981	R. B. Miller	NRP
1987	Mike Ellis	PFP
1989	Mike Ellis	Democratic
1994	Constituency abolished	

== Detailed results ==
=== Elections in the 1930s ===
General election 1938: Durban North
Party	Candidate	Votes	%	±%
Labour	C. F. Miles-Cadman	3,509	64.6	New
United	A. H. J. Eaton	1,892	34.8	New
Rejected ballots		34	0.6	N/A
Majority		1,617	29.8	N/A
Turnout		5,435	83.0	N/A
Labour win (new seat)				
