= Durban District (House of Assembly of South Africa constituency) =

- Durban-Distrik
- Former constituency for the South African House of Assembly
- Province: Natal
- Electorate: 5,916 (1933)

Former constituency
- Created: 1929
- Abolished: 1938
- Number of members: 1
- Last MHA: A. H. J. Eaton (UP)
- Replaced by: Durban North

Durban District (Afrikaans: Durban-Distrik), also referred to as Durban County, was a short-lived constituency in the Natal Province of South Africa, which existed from 1929 to 1938. It covered the rural area surrounding the city of Durban. Throughout its existence it elected one member to the House of Assembly.

== Franchise notes ==
When the Union of South Africa was formed in 1910, the electoral qualifications in use in each pre-existing colony were kept in place. The franchise used in the Natal Colony, while theoretically not restricted by race, was significantly less liberal than that of the Cape, and no more than a few hundred non-white electors ever qualified. In 1908, an estimated 200 of the 22,786 electors in the colony were of non-European descent, and by 1935, only one remained. By 1958, when the last non-white voters in the Cape were taken off the rolls, Natal too had an all-white electorate. The franchise was also restricted by property and education qualifications until the 1933 general election, following the passage of the Women's Enfranchisement Act, 1930 and the Franchise Laws Amendment Act, 1931. From then on, the franchise was given to all white citizens aged 21 or over, which remained the case until the end of apartheid and the introduction of universal suffrage in 1994.

== History ==
As in the rest of Natal, Durban District's electorate was largely English-speaking and conservative, and throughout its existence it was a safe seat for the governing South African Party. In fact, it only had a single MP, Alexander Henry Joseph Eaton, who won the new seat by a wide margin in 1929 and was re-elected by a smaller margin in 1933. Like most SAP MPs, Eaton joined the United Party on its formation in 1934, and when the seat was abolished for the 1938 general election, he stood for election to the newly-created seat of Durban North and lost - however, he would return as MP for the urban seat of Durban Musgrave ten years later.

== Members ==
| Election | Member | Party |
|---|---|---|
| 1929 | A. H. J. Eaton | South African |
| 1933 | A. H. J. Eaton | South African |
| 1934 | A. H. J. Eaton | United |
| 1938 | constituency abolished | |

== Detailed results ==
=== Elections in the 1920s ===
General election 1929: Durban District
| Party | Candidate | Votes | % | ±% |
|---|---|---|---|---|
| South African | A. H. J. Eaton | 1,383 | 70.2 | New |
| Labour (Creswell) | Frank Nettleton | 403 | 20.5 | New |
| Labour (National Council) | B. W. Matthews | 172 | 8.7 | New |
| Rejected ballots | | 11 | 0.6 | N/A |
| Majority | | 980 | 39.7 | N/A |
| Turnout | | 1,969 | 74.3 | N/A |
| South African win (new seat) | | | | |

=== Elections in the 1930s ===
General election 1933: Durban District
| Party | Candidate | Votes | % | ±% |
|---|---|---|---|---|
| South African | A. H. J. Eaton | 1,787 | 42.5 | −27.7 |
| Federalist | T. H. Blew | 1,290 | 30.7 | New |
| Natal Home Rule Party | R. J. Unsworth | 1,096 | 26.1 | New |
| Rejected ballots | | 31 | 0.7 | +0.1 |
| Majority | | 497 | 11.8 | N/A |
| Turnout | | 4,204 | 71.1 | −3.2 |
| South African hold | | Swing | N/A | |
