= Samantha Graham-Maré =

South African politician (born 1969)

Samantha Graham-Maré MP
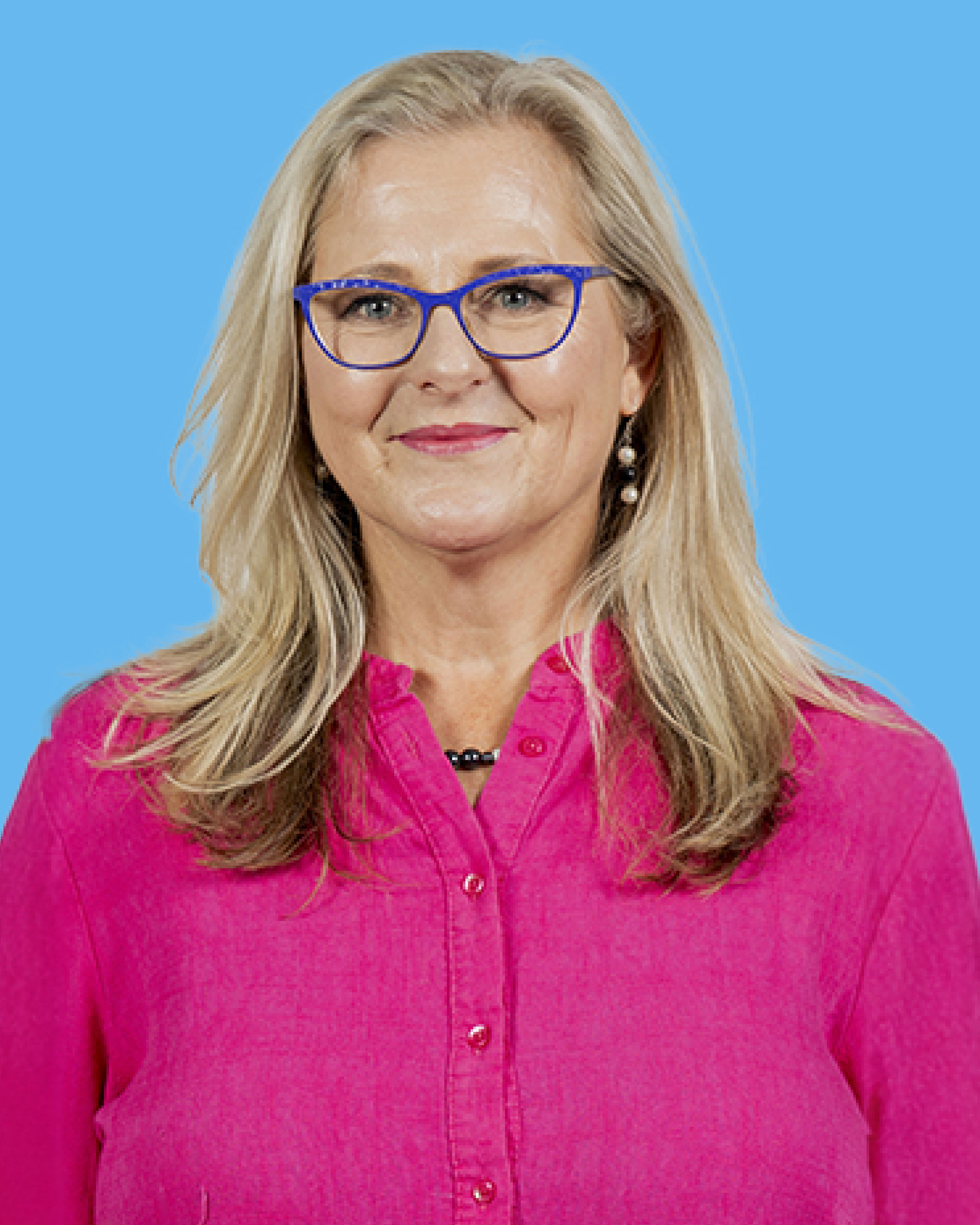
- Graham-Maré in 2024

Deputy Minister of Electricity and Energy
- In office 3 July 2024 – 30 June 2026
- Minister: Kgosientsho Ramokgopa
- Preceded by: Nobuhle Nkabane
- Succeeded by: Alexandra Abrahams

Shadow Minister of Electricity
- In office 21 April 2023 – 14 June 2024
- Leader: John Steenhuisen
- Preceded by: Office established

Shadow Minister of Public Works and Infrastructure
- In office 5 December 2020 – 21 April 2023
- Deputy: Madeleine Hicklin
- Leader: John Steenhuisen
- Preceded by: Patricia Kopane
- Succeeded by: Isaac Seitlholo

Shadow Deputy Minister of Public Works and infrastructure
- In office 5 June 2019 – 5 December 2020
- Leader: John Steenhuisen; Mmusi Maimane
- Preceded by: Position established
- Succeeded by: Madeleine Hicklin

Member of the National Assembly of South Africa
- Incumbent
- Assumed office 22 May 2019
- Constituency: Eastern Cape

Personal details
- Born: 27 May 1969 (age 57)
- Party: Democratic Alliance (2007–present)
- Spouse(s): Rodney Maré (m. 2019) Nikolas Jankovich (former)
- Children: 2
- Education: Rhenish Girls' High School
- Alma mater: University of South Africa (LLB)
- Occupation: Member of Parliament
- Profession: Politician

Samantha Graham-Maré (born 27 May 1969) is a South African politician from the Eastern Cape who was elected to the National Assembly of South Africa in the 2019 general election and re-elected in the 2024 general election as a member of the Democratic Alliance. Graham-Maré was the Deputy Minister of Electricity and Energy from 2024 until 2026. Graham-Maré served as the shadow deputy minister of public works and infrastructure from 2019 to 2020 and as the shadow minister for the portfolio between 2020 and 2023, when she was named shadow minister of electricity. She is a former councillor of the Dr Beyers Naudé Local Municipality.

== Early life and education ==
Samantha Graham-Maré was born on 27 May 1969. She matriculated from Rhenish Girls' High School in Stellenbosch in 1986. In December 2021, Graham-Maré graduated cum laude from the University of South Africa with a Bachelor of Laws (LLB).

== Political career ==
Graham-Maré became a member of the Democratic Alliance in 2007. Only in 2009, she became an active member of the party. She then formed a branch in Aberdeen and got elected as the branch chairperson.

For the May 2011 municipal elections, she stood as a DA ward councillor candidate, but narrowly lost to the African National Congress candidate. She was then appointed as a PR councillor. Graham-Maré was selected as the DA's mayoral candidate for the newly established Dr Beyers Naudé Local Municipality ahead of the 2016 municipal elections. The ANC narrowly retained control of the municipality and Graham-Maré was elected as a PR councillor.

During her tenure on the Dr Beyers Naudé local council, she was the DA's caucus leader, the Portfolio Chairperson on Corporate Services and a member of the municipality's executive committee. Graham-Maré is also a member of the DA's provincial council and the provincial disciplinary committee.

== Parliamentary career ==
Prior to the 8 May 2019 general elections, Graham-Maré was placed 6th on the DA's regional list, 77th on its national list and 23rd on its provincial list. She was elected to the National Assembly on the regional list. She became a Member of Parliament on 22 May 2019.

On 5 June 2019, the DA parliamentary leader, Mmusi Maimane, appointed her as shadow deputy minister of public works and infrastructure. Shortly afterwards, she was appointed as the DA's constituency leader for the Dr Beyers Naude municipality. Graham-Maré became a member of the Portfolio Committee on Public Works and Infrastructure on 27 June 2019.

Graham-Maré was appointed Shadow Minister of Public Works and Infrastructure in December 2020, succeeding Patricia Kopane.

In February 2023, Graham-Maré was elected as one of three deputy provincial chairpersons of the DA.

Graham-Maré was promoted to Shadow Minister of Electricity and an additional member of the Public Enterprises, Mineral Resources and Energy, and Public Service and Administration (The Presidency) portfolios during a shadow cabinet reshuffle on 21 April 2023.

Graham-Maré was re-elected to the National Assembly in the 2024 general election. She was appointed Deputy Minister of Electricity and Energy.

On 17 June 2026, DA leader Geordin Hill-Lewis wrote to President Cyril Ramaphosa, requesting that he remove Graham-Maré as the Deputy Minister of Energy and Electricity and replace her with Alexandra Abrahams. Ramaphosa finalised Hill-Lewis's request on 30 June, removing her from the national executive.

== Personal life ==
Graham-Maré was previously married to Nikolas Jankovich. They have two children from the marriage. She and her family moved from Cape Town to Aberdeen, Eastern Cape in December 2008. In October 2010, she was diagnosed with breast cancer. She finished her chemotherapy 10 days before the May 18, 2011 local elections. Graham-Maré and her family moved to Graaff-Reinet in 2012. In July 2018, Graham-Maré was diagnosed with a recurrence of breast cancer. She then had a double mastectomy in August.

She married Rodney Maré in May 2019.
