= Madala Ntombela =

South African politician

Member of the National Assembly of South Africa
- In office 21 May 2014 – 28 May 2024
- Constituency: Free State

Personal details
- Born: Madala Louis David Ntombela
- Party: African National Congress
- Spouse: Sisi Ntombela
- Profession: Politician

Madala Louis David Ntombela is a South African politician. A member of the African National Congress, he was elected as an ANC Member of the National Assembly of South Africa in 2014 and re-elected in 2019. Ntombela served as House Chairperson for International Relations. He left parliament at the 2024 general election.

Ntombela is married to the former Premier of the Free State, Sisi Ntombela; both are former mayors of Tweeling.
