= Wilmot James =

South African politician

Prof. Wilmot James
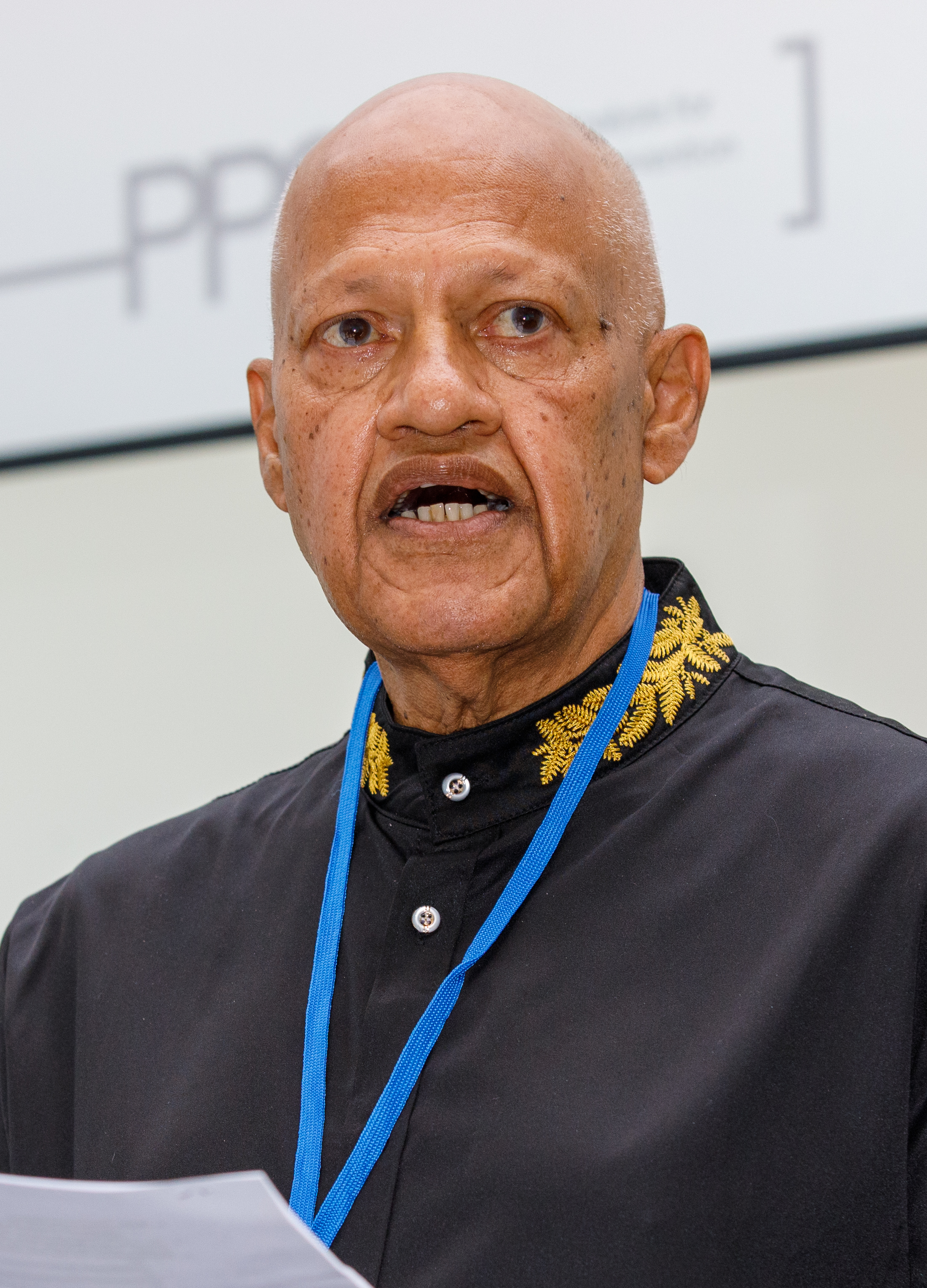

Shadow Minister of Health
- In office 2014 – 1 June 2017
- Leader: Helen Zille
- Preceded by: Patricia Kopane
- Succeeded by: Patricia Kopane

Shadow Minister of Trade and Industry
- In office 2012–2014
- Preceded by: Tim Harris
- Succeeded by: Geordin Hill-Lewis

Shadow Minister of Basic Education
- In office 1 September 2010 – 1 February 2012
- Preceded by: Junita Kloppers-Lourens
- Succeeded by: Annette Lovemore

Member of Parliament for Western Cape
- In office 6 May 2009 – 1 June 2017

Personal details
- Born: 5 July 1953 (age 73) Paarl, Cape Province, Union of South Africa
- Spouse: Delecia Forbes
- Children: Gabriele James, Isabella James
- Education: University of the Western Cape, University of Wisconsin–Madison, Yale University, California Institute of Technology, Brown University
- Occupation: University Professor
- Profession: Sociologist

Wilmot Godfrey James (born 5 July 1953) is a South African academic who served as the country's opposition spokesperson of health. He was a Member of Parliament for the opposition Democratic Alliance.

His constituencies were Mitchells Plain and Rondebosch. He was elected the party's Federal Chairperson between 2010 and 2015. Dr. James contested for the post of party leader in 2016, but lost the election to Mmusi Maimane.

During his career, James served as director of Sanlam, Media24 and the Africa Genome Education Institute, and was chairperson of the Cape Philharmonic Orchestra and the Immigration Advisory Board of South Africa. He is also a former Trustee of the Ford Foundation of New York.

James previously served as a Senior Research Scholar at the Institute for Social and Economic Research and Policy in the College of Arts and Sciences at Columbia University in New York City. He currently serves as Professor of Health Policy, Services and Practice and serves as a Senior Advisor to the Pandemic Center, School of Public Health at Brown University, in Providence, USA.

== Early years ==
Wilmot James was born in Paarl on 5 July 1953, to Peter Charles James and Shelma Rumine Hartel. He attended Athlone High School, and matriculated in 1970.

== University and academia ==
Dr. James graduated from the University of the Western Cape in 1977 with a Bachelor of Arts Honours cum laude. He was awarded a Fulbright Scholarship to study in the United States, and attained his MS from the University of Wisconsin–Madison in 1978, and a PhD from the same institution in 1982. In 1985 he held a post doctoral fellowship at the Southern African Research Program, Yale University. He was a visiting professor at Indiana University, Bloomington, in 1990, and a visiting fellow at the American Bar Foundation in Chicago in 1992.

Dr. James joined the Department of Sociology as a lecturer at the University of Cape Town in 1986 and rose to become a full Professor by 1993. In early 1994 he was seconded to the Independent Electoral Commission (IEC) to run the information division for the Western Cape during the nation's first democratic election.

He succeeded Dr. Alex Boraine to become the executive director of the Institute for Democracy in South Africa in 1994, and served at IDASA until 1998. In 1999 he was appointed Dean of Humanities at the University of Cape Town.

Dr. James advised the Office of President Nelson Mandela's Director-General Jakes Gerwel on the renaming of his (Mandela's) Cape residence – from Westbrooke to Genadendal – and on constitutional rights education for colored (mixed descent) communities (see Now That We Are Free, Boulder, Lynne Rienner Publishers, 1996) torn between accepting majority rule and worrying about minority interests.

With the late Kader Asmal and David Chidester, he served as a contributing author and co-editor of Nelson Mandela in His Own Words (Boston and London, Little Brown and Co., 2003, republished in 2018). In all, Dr. James is the author of 3 and editor or co-editor of 14 books. His most recent book is Vital Signs: Health Security in South Africa (Brenthurst Foundation, Johannesburg, 2020).

James was appointed an executive director at the Human Sciences Research Council in 2001, a position he held until 2004.

In 2003 he was the Gordon Moore Distinguished Visiting Professor of the Humanities at the California Institute of Technology in Pasadena, California.

In 2005 James was appointed Director of the Africa Genome Education Institute.

James was an Honorary Professor of Sociology (University of Pretoria) and Human Genetics (University of Cape Town). He is an Honorary Professor of Public Health at the [University of the Witwatersrand] today

James is currently a professor of the Practice of Health Services, Policy and Practice at the Brown University School of Public Health.

== Other positions ==
In 2001, James was appointed Associate Editor at the Cape Argus newspaper, but left the paper later that year. In 2004 he became a Director at Naspers's Media24.

James served as a trustee of the Ford Foundation of New York between 1996 and 2008.

== Parliament ==
In 2009 James became a Member of Parliament with the Democratic Alliance, South Africa's opposition party. He was first appointed as opposition spokesperson on higher education, and later moved to the basic education portfolio. In 2010 he was elected federal chairperson of the party unopposed, a post he held for five years. He served as spokesperson of trade and industry for his party between 2012 and 2014, and as spokesperson on health till June 2017.

In June 2017, Wilmot James left parliament for a visiting professorship in the US focusing on global fight against infectious disease epidemics as a visiting professor at the Columbia University Vagelos College of Physicians and Surgeons in New York.
