= Thanduxolo Khalipha =

South African politician

Executive Mayor of the Matjhabeng Local Municipality
- Incumbent
- Assumed office 29 November 2021
- Preceded by: Nkosinjani Speelman

Member of the National Assembly of South Africa
- In office 22 May 2019 – 24 November 2021
- Constituency: Free State

Personal details
- Born: Thanduxolo David Khalipha; 26 January 1963 (age 63)
- Party: African National Congress
- Profession: Politician

Thanduxolo David Khalipha (born 26 January 1963) is a South African politician who has been the Executive Mayor of the Matjhabeng Local Municipality since 2021. He was a Member of the National Assembly of South Africa from the Free State from 2019 to 2021. Khalipha is a member of the African National Congress.

== Political career ==
A member of the African National Congress, Khalipha served as the ward councillor for ward 17 in the Matjhabeng Local Municipality before he was elected to parliament.

== Parliamentary career ==
In 2019, he stood for election to the South African National Assembly as the 3rd candidate on the ANC's list of parliamentary candidates from the Free State. He was elected in the election and was sworn in as an MP on 22 May 2019.

On 27 June 2019, he was named to the Portfolio Committee on Tourism.

Khalipha became a member of the Committee for Section 194 Enquiry, which will determine Public Protector Busisiwe Mkhwebane's fitness to hold office, on 21 June 2021.

== Mayoral career ==
In the local government elections of 1 November 2021, the ANC retained their majority on the municipal council of the Matjhabeng Local Municipality. Khalipha was formally announced as the ANC's mayoral candidate on 16 November. The Free State ANC was criticised for nominating Khalipha because he allegedly did not have a matric certificate. The provincial ANC defended him, arguing that he has "strategic leadership" skills. He resigned from the National Assembly on 24 November and was elected mayor on 29 November.

== Personal life ==
Khalipha lives in Welkom in the Free State.
