= Peter Khoarai =

South African politician (born 1966)

Member of the National Assembly
- In office 18 May 2005 – 7 May 2019
- Constituency: Free State

Member of the Free State Provincial Legislature
- In office April 2004 – May 2005

Personal details
- Born: Lefu Peter Khoarai; 8 March 1966 (age 60)
- Citizenship: South Africa
- Party: African National Congress

Lefu Peter Khoarai (born 8 March 1966) is a South African politician from the Free State. He represented the African National Congress (ANC) in the National Assembly from 2005 to 2019, serving the Free State constituency. Before that, he served briefly in the Free State Provincial Legislature from 2004 to 2005.

== Early life and career ==
Born on 8 March 1966, Khoarai was formerly a youth activist in Rammolutsi, a township outside Viljoenskroon in the former Orange Free State. He was active in the Rammolutsi Youth Congress and later joined the ANC Youth League. After the end of apartheid, he served as deputy secretary of the ANC's branch in Rammolutsi and as a local councillor in Fezile Dabi; he was also employed as a membership officer in the Free State ANC.

== Legislative career ==
In the 2004 general election, Khoarai was elected to represent the ANC in the Free State Provincial Legislature, where he chaired the Committee on Tourism and Environmental Affairs. He served only a year in his provincial seat: on 18 May 2005, he was sworn in to the Free State caucus of the National Assembly, swopping seats with Neo Masithela.

He was re-elected to full terms in the National Assembly in 2009 and 2014. He was assigned to the ANC's constituency office in Viljoenskroon and served on the Portfolio Committee on Human Settlements during the 26th Parliament.
