= Manana Tlake =

South African politician (born 1956)

Delegate to the National Council of Provinces

Assembly Member for Free State
- In office 22 May 2014 – 11 April 2016

Member of the National Assembly
- In office 24 July 2006 – 6 May 2014

Personal details
- Born: 17 June 1956 (age 69)
- Citizenship: South Africa
- Party: African National Congress

Manana Florence Tlake (born 17 June 1956) is a South African politician from the Free State. She represented the African National Congress (ANC) in Parliament from 2006 to 2016, first in the National Assembly and then, from 2014, in the National Council of Provinces.

== Early life and career ==
Born on 17 June 1956, Tlake has a Bachelor's degree in nursing. Before joining legislative politics, she served as a member of the Free State Commission for Gender Equity and as director for strategy in the Motheo Municipality. She was also the chairperson of the Free State branch of the ANC Women's League in the mid-1990s.

== Legislative career ==
Tlake joined the National Assembly on 24 July 2006, filling the casual vacancy created by Selby Khumalo's resignation. She was elected to a full term in the 2009 general election, now on the ANC's Free State party list rather than the national list, and she served until the 2014 general election. In addition, in 2010, the ANC appointed her as the party's whip in the Women's Caucus and in the Portfolio Committee on Women, Youth, Children and People with Disability. She was also a member of the Provincial Executive Committee of the ANC's Free State branch.

After the 2014 election, Tlake was sworn in to the National Council of Provinces, where she led the Free State caucus. She resigned from Parliament on 11 April 2016.
