= Patricia Kopane =

South African politician

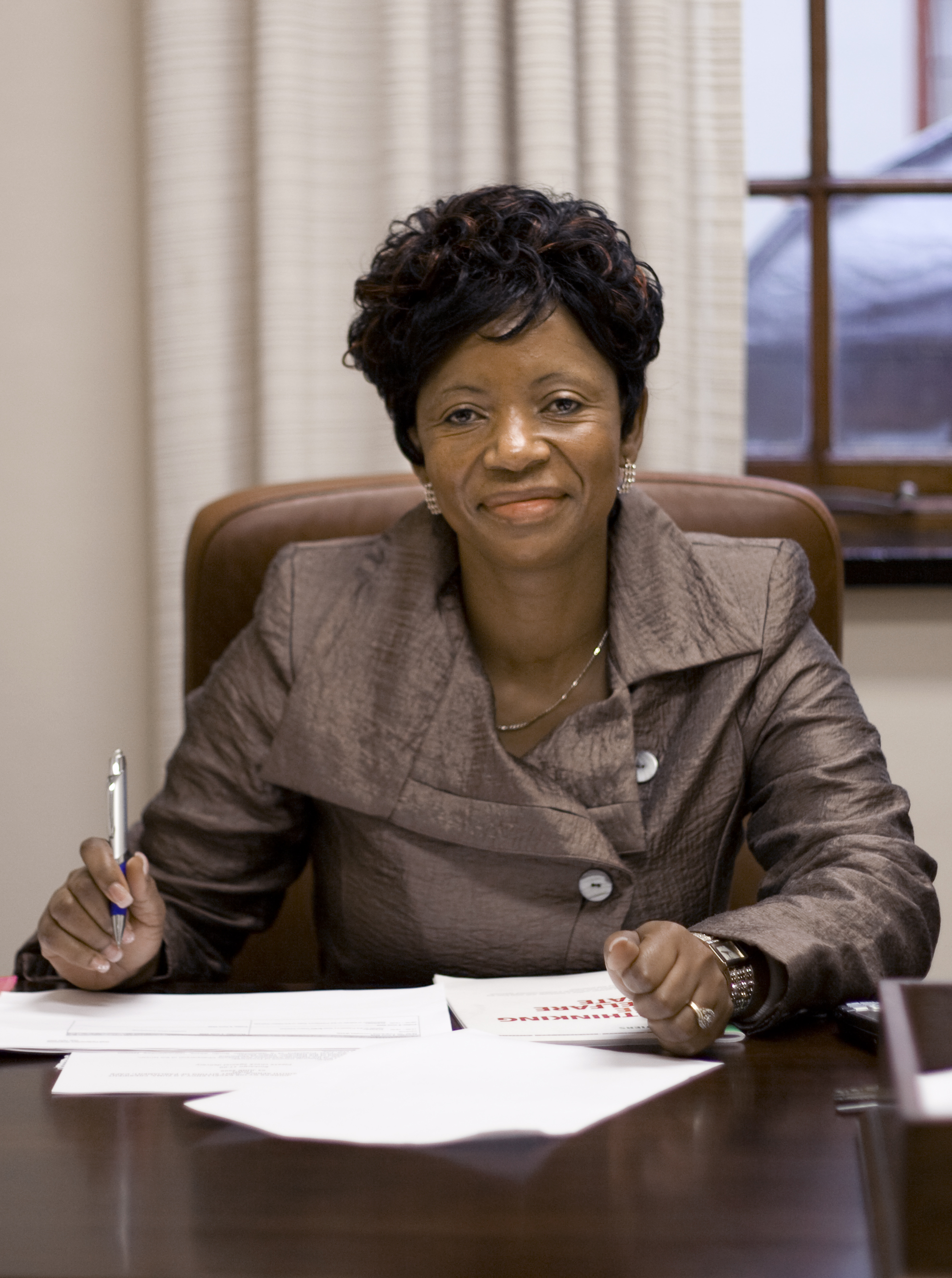
- Kopane in 2009

Leader of the Democratic Alliance in the Free State
- In office 17 September 2012 – 14 November 2020
- Preceded by: Roy Jankielsohn
- Succeeded by: Roy Jankielsohn

Shadow Minister of Public Works and Infrastructure
- In office 5 June 2019 – 5 December 2020
- Leader: John Steenhuisen; Mmusi Maimane
- Preceded by: Position established
- Succeeded by: Samantha Graham

Shadow Minister of Health
- In office 1 June 2017 – 5 June 2019
- Leader: Mmusi Maimane
- Preceded by: Wilmot James
- Succeeded by: Siviwe Gwarube
- In office 1 February 2012 – 5 June 2014
- Leader: Lindiwe Mazibuko
- Preceded by: Mike Waters
- Succeeded by: Wilmot James

Shadow Minister of Public Works
- In office 3 October 2015 – 1 June 2017
- Leader: Mmusi Maimane
- Preceded by: Kenneth Mubu
- Succeeded by: Malcolm Figg

Shadow Minister of Social Development
- In office 5 June 2014 – 3 October 2015
- Leader: Mmusi Maimane
- Preceded by: Mike Waters
- Succeeded by: Bridget Masango
- In office 14 May 2009 – 1 February 2012
- Leader: Lindiwe Mazibuko; Athol Trollip
- Preceded by: Unknown
- Succeeded by: Mike Waters

Member of the National Assembly
- In office 6 May 2009 – 15 August 2022
- Constituency: Free State

Personal details
- Born: 23 July 1966 (age 59) Bloemfontein, Orange Free State Province, South Africa
- Party: ActionSA (2022–present); Democratic Alliance (2003–2022)

Semakaleng Patricia Kopane (born 23 July 1966) is a South African politician. She is the current provincial chairperson of ActionSA in the Free State.

A former member of the Democratic Alliance, she served as a Member of the National Assembly from May 2009 until her resignation from the DA in August 2022. She was the Leader of the Democratic Alliance in the Free State province from 2012 to 2020. Kopane was previously Shadow Minister of Public Works and Infrastructure, Shadow Minister of Health, Shadow Minister of Public Works and Shadow Minister of Social Development. She was the Democratic Alliance's Free State Premier candidate for the 2019 election.

== Early life and career ==
Kopane was born in Bloemfontein but spent most of her childhood in the small village of Dithutaneng in Qwaqwa. Before entering politics, she worked as a professional nurse. She had also worked for the Cancer Association of South Africa.

== Political career ==
Kopane became a member of the Democratic Alliance in 2003. She initially began her political career as a consultant in the Free State Provincial Legislature and went on to coordinate the Provincial Lead Programme from 2004 to 2006.

She was elected to the Mangaung Municipality's City Council in 2006. Kopane served as a councillor until her election the National Assembly in 2009. Having entered Parliament, Kopane became a member of the Democratic Alliance's Shadow Cabinet as Shadow Minister of Social Development. She took office as Shadow Minister of Health in February 2012. In September 2012, Kopane became the new Provincial Leader of the Democratic Alliance following her election at the party's provincial conference in Bloemfontein.

After the 2014 elections, newly appointed DA Parliamentary Leader Mmusi Maimane kept her in the Shadow Cabinet and returned her to the post of Shadow Minister of Social Development. In April 2015, Kopane won re-election to a second term as Provincial Leader. In October 2015, she moved to the Public Works portfolio of the Shadow Cabinet. She later returned to the position of Shadow Minister of Health in June 2017. She won another term as Provincial Leader of the party in October 2017.

Kopane was a parliamentary whip and a member of the Coalitions Committee, the Federal Executive, the Federal Council and the Federal Legal Commission.

On 11 September 2018, Maimane announced Kopane as the party's Free State Premier candidate for the 2019 election. He said that Kopane was one of the party's "most humble leaders and a loyal servant of the people".

In the May 2019 election, the Democratic Alliance increased its support in the Free State. The party gained one seat in the provincial legislature, going from five to six seats.

On 5 June 2019, she was named Shadow Minister of Public Works and Infrastructure.

Kopane announced in September 2020 that she would not be seeking re-election to another term as provincial leader of the party. She also confirmed that she would remain a member of parliament and shadow minister. Her predecessor, Roy Jankielsohn, was elected to succeed her.

On 5 December 2020, Samantha Graham was announced as the new Shadow Minister of Public Works and Infrastructure. Kopane was assigned to the Standing Committee on the Auditor-General.

On 15 August 2022, Kopane resigned as a DA member, and therefore as a Member of Parliament. She said in her resignation letter: "I feel that I no longer belong to the DA any longer, and I don’t even have a space where I can make a contribution to the country." Kopane also said that she would be in talks with ActionSA leader Herman Mashaba. Kopane joined a long list of black DA leaders who had resigned from the party in recent months.

On 7 September 2022, Kopane was announced as ActionSA's provincial chairperson.

== Personal life ==
Kopane was married to Mojalefa Kopane, a high school teacher from Bloemfontein, until his death in February 2019.

Kopane's father, James Letuka, was a DA public representative. He served as a Member of the Free State Provincial Legislature.
