= Emily Wilson (actress) =

American actress

- Occupation: Actress
- Years active: 2005–present
- Spouse: Adhir Kalyan (m. 2016)
- Children: 2
- Relatives: Sandy Kalyan (mother-in-law)

Emily Wilson is an American actress.

== Career ==
Wilson began her acting career in 2005 in the TV series NCIS ("SWAK"). In 2006, she was the Audition Revealed - Winner on KTLA Morning News. In 2007, Wilson guest starred on MADtv, Californication, and Side Order of Life.

Wilson was in Meet the Spartans (2008) and The House Bunny (2008). In 2009, she guest starred on Secret Girlfriend. In 2010, Wilson was in the independent film The Boys and Girls Guide to Getting Down and L.A. Vampire. She also guest starred on Entourage and How I Met Your Mother in 2010. Wilson then guest starred on Pair of Kings, CSI: NY, Nick Swardson's Pretend Time, Bones, The Newsroom and Hello Ladies.

=== General Hospital ===
In 2012, Wilson was cast in the ABC's General Hospital as Ellie Trout. She first appeared on September 14, 2012. The anticipated airdate was confused by some with that of Teresa Castillo's role as Sabrina Santiago, who then appeared September 19. A representative of the show later confirmed that Wilson had joined the cast on a recurring basis. On December 12, 2013, it was announced that Wilson, as well as Bradford Anderson, would exit the series. Wilson (Trout) came back in 2014 and 2015.

== Personal life ==
In April 2015, Wilson announced her engagement to Adhir Kalyan, of Rules of Engagement. She and Kalyan married on October 1, 2016, in Palm Springs, California. They welcomed their first child, a daughter, born on March 23, 2021. They welcomed their second child, a son, on October 11, 2024.

== Filmography ==
=== Film ===
Year	Title	Role	Notes	Ref
2008	Meet The Spartans	Lindsay Lohan look-alike	American parody film directed by Jason Friedberg and Aaron Seltzer.	
2008	The House Bunny	Brittany	romantic comedy film directed by Fred Wolf.	
2010	The Boys and Girls Guide to Getting Down	Angela	An independent film directed by Paul Sapiano.	
2010	L.A. Vampire	Megan	Directed by Ryo Rex.	
2011	The Hike	Sarah	Directed by Walter Michael Bost.	
2011	Can You Watch This	Ashley	Short film directed by Jack McWilliams.	
2014	The Secret Lives of Dorks	Karen	Directed by Salomé Breziner.	
2017	Brothered Up	Officer Kilpatrick	TV film directed by James Burrows.	

=== Television ===
Year	Title	Role	Notes	Ref
2005	NCIS	Young Hanna Lowell	Episode: "SWAK" (S 2:Ep 22)	
2006	KTLA Morning News	The Audition Revealed - Winner		
2007	MADtv	High School Graduate	Episode: "Episode 22" (S 12:Ep 22)	
2007	Californication	P.Y.T		
2007	Side Order of Life	Veronica	Episode: "Aliens" (S 1:Ep 11)	
2009	Secret Girlfriend	Nikki	Episode: "You Learn to Appreciate Life" (S 1:Ep 2)	
2009–2010	Disaster Date	Herself	A hidden camera TV-show on MTV in which actors go on a blind date with a person.	
2010	Entourage	Amy	Episode: "Buzzed" (S 7:Ep 2)	
2010	How I Met Your Mother	Marshall's Daughter	Episode: "Baby Talk" (S 6:Ep 6)	
2011	Pair of Kings	Gertrude	Episode: "The Young and the Restless" (S 2:Ep 19)	
2011	CSI: NY	Colette	Episode: "Vigilante" (S 7:Ep 15)	
2011	Nick Swardson's Pretend Time	Woman	Episode: "Show Me on the Doll" (S 2:Ep 2)	
2011	Nick Swardson's Pretend Time	Wife	Episode: "Flying Stripper" (S 2:Ep 6)	
2011	Bones	Emma	Episode: "The Twist in the Twister" (S 7:Ep 5)	
2012	The Newsroom	Shannon Bryer	Episode: "I'll Try to Fix You" (S 1:Ep 4)	
2012–2016, 2022	General Hospital	Ellie Trout	Recurring	
2013	New Girl	Carol	Episode: "Chicago" ( S 2:Ep 20)	
2013	Hello Ladies	Tampon Casting Woman	Episode: "The Date" (S 1:Ep 3)	
2014	Castle	Grace Jacobs	Episode: "Dressed To Kill" (S 6:Ep 14)	
2014	The Newsroom	Shannon Bryer	Episode: "Main Justice" (S 3:Ep 3)	
2015	It's Always Sunny in Philadelphia	Flight Attendant	Episode: "The Gang Beats Boggs" (S 10:Ep 1)	
2016	TripTank	Ho #2 (Voice)	Episode: "Sick Day" (S 2:Ep 13)	
2017	The Hero Effect	Herself	Episode: "Katie's Krops" (S 1:Ep 1)	
2019	Ryan Hansen Solves Crimes on Television	Blossom	Episode: "I'm Sorry, She Classpassed" (S 2:Ep 4)	
