= Madeleine Hicklin =

South African politician (born 1957)

Madeleine Hicklin MPL

Member of the Gauteng Provincial Legislature
- Incumbent
- Assumed office 14 June 2024

Member of the National Assembly of South Africa
- In office 22 May 2019 – 28 May 2024

Personal details
- Born: 3 September 1957 (age 69)
- Party: Democratic Alliance
- Profession: Politician

Madeleine Bertine Hicklin (born 3 September 1957) is a South African politician who has served as a Member of the Gauteng Provincial Legislature since June 2024. Previously, she served as a ward councillor in the City of Johannesburg Metropolitan Municipality from August 2016 to May 2019 and as a Member of the National Assembly of South Africa from May 2019 until May 2024. Hicklin is a member of the Democratic Alliance.

== Politics ==
Hicklin joined the Democratic Alliance and was elected as the ward councillor for ward 112 of the City of Johannesburg Metropolitan Municipality in the 2016 municipal election.

== Parliamentary career ==
Hicklin was nominated to the National Assembly following the general election that was held on 8 May 2019. She was sworn in as an MP on 22 May 2019. On 27 June 2019, she was given her committee assignment.

On 5 December 2020, Hicklin was appointed as Shadow Deputy Minister of Public Works and Infrastructure, succeeding Samantha Graham, who became shadow minister.

=== Committee membership ===
- Portfolio Committee on Public Works and Infrastructure (Alternate Member)

== Provincial Legislature ==
Hicklin was elected to the Gauteng Provincial Legislature in the 2024 provincial election.

== Personal life ==
Hicklin is a niece of the late anti-apartheid activist Denis Goldberg. She is also Jewish.
