= Andries Botha (Free State politician) =

South African politician (born 1939)

Member of the National Assembly
- In office 2 December 2006 – May 2009
- In office June 1999 – April 2004

Personal details
- Born: Andries Johannes Botha; 12 July 1939 (age 86)
- Citizenship: South Africa
- Party: Democratic Alliance (since 2000); Democratic Party (until 2000)
- Spouse: Sandra Botha

Andries Johannes Botha (born 12 July 1939) is retired a South African politician who served in the National Assembly and Free State Provincial Legislature, representing the Democratic Alliance (DA) and the Democratic Party (DA). He is a former leader of the DA's Free State branch.

== Legislative career ==
Botha was elected to a seat in the National Assembly in the 1999 general election. He represented the DP, which shortly afterwards became the DA, and he served the Free State constituency. In the next general election in 2004, He left the national Parliament to take up a seat in the Free State Provincial Legislature, ranked first on the DA's list for the province. However, on 2 December 2006, he was sworn back in to the National Assembly, again representing the Free State constituency; he filled a casual vacancy that arose in the DA caucus after Roy Jankielsohn's resignation. He retired from his seat after the 2009 general election.

== Personal life ==
Botha is married to national politician Sandra Botha, who retired alongside him in 2009.
