= Sandy Kalyan =

South African politician (born 1957)

Sandy Kalyan MP
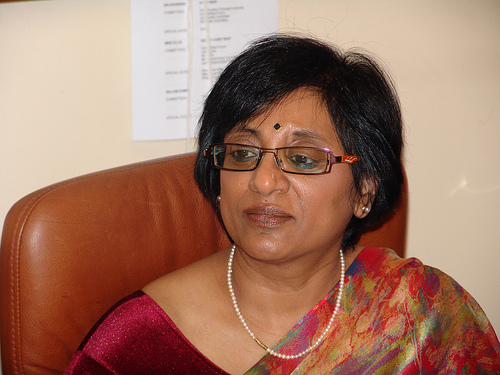

Deputy Chief Whip of the Democratic Alliance
- In office 2011–2014
- Leader: Helen Zille
- Preceded by: Mike Ellis
- Succeeded by: Mike Waters

Member of Parliament for West Durban, KwaZulu-Natal
- In office 1999–2019

Personal details
- Born: 26 July 1957 (age 69) KwaZulu-Natal
- Party: Democratic Alliance
- Spouse: Jitendra Kalyan
- Relations: Emily Wilson (daughter-in-law)
- Children: 2, including Adhir
- Education: University of KwaZulu-Natal and University of the Witwatersrand
- Profession: Psychologist

Santosh Vinita "Sandy" Kalyan (born 26 July 1957) is a South African politician, and a former Democratic Alliance member of Parliament's National Assembly, where she served as the Shadow Minister of Science and Technology until 2012.

She served as the DA Shadow Deputy Minister for International Relations & Cooperation. She was also a Member of the Pan-African Parliament.

== Background ==
Kalyan was born in KwaZulu-Natal. She is married to Jitendra Kalyan with two children, actor Adhir and Kirthi.

Kalyan attended high school at the Gandhi Desai High School and later pursued a Master of Education. She holds the Teacher’s Diploma and is reading for the Doctorate of Education and a second masters in Sexology. She also holds a certificate in HIV/AIDS, Sports Psychology, and Migration. She worked as an educator from 1979 to 1993. Since 1994, she has been a psychologist with a main focus of interest in the field of HIV/AIDS.

== Parliamentarian ==
Kalyan had been an MP since 1999, first elected for the Democratic Party which was later renamed Democratic Alliance, and has served on the Health, Social Development, and Home Affairs portfolio committees. She was the DA spokesperson HIV/AIDS from 2004 to 2009, and has also been a whip since 2000. On her re-election to Parliament in 2009, she retained her position as a whip and was appointed as the Shadow Minister of Science and Technology. She was elected Deputy Chief Whip in 2011.

Kalyan serves on several other committees including the Chief Whips Forum, the NA Programme committee, the NA and the Joint Rules committees, the Members Facilities Leadership Program, Quarterly Consultative Forum, and the Africa Peer Review Mechanism. She is the spokesperson for Portfolio Committee On Home Affairs.

She left parliament in 2019.
