= Ruth Magau =

South African politician

Member of the National Assembly
- In office 23 April 2004 – 1 February 2013

Personal details
- Citizenship: South Africa
- Party: African National Congress
- Education: University of Fort Hare

Kgomotso Ruth Magau is a South African politician and diplomat and former civil servant who represented the African National Congress (ANC) in the National Assembly from 2004 to 2013. A teacher by profession, she formerly represented the ANC as a local councillor in her hometown, Parys.

== Political career ==
Magau matriculated in 1988 at Phehellang Secondary School in Parys in the Orange Free State. She completed a Bachelor of Arts at the University of Fort Hare in 1992 and worked as a high school teacher from 1993 to 2003. At the same time, she represented the ANC as a local councillor in Parys from 1999 to 2003. In the 2004 general election, she was elected to a seat in the National Assembly, representing the Free State constituency; she was re-elected to a second term in 2009.

== Diplomatic career ==
She resigned from Parliament on 1 February 2013 and joined the South African diplomatic corps. She was South African Ambassador to Vietnam until December 2017 and subsequently served as South African High Commissioner to Cameroon.
