= Bheki Radebe =

South African politician (born 1965)

Member of the National Assembly of South Africa
- In office 16 May 1999 – 28 May 2024
- Constituency: Free State

Personal details
- Born: Bhekizizwe Abram Radebe; 4 November 1965 (age 60)
- Party: African National Congress
- Education: University of Zululand (B.P.Ed); Nelson Mandela University (MBA)

Bhekizizwe Abram Radebe (born 4 November 1965) is a South African politician who served as a member of the National Assembly of South Africa from the Free State from 1999 until 2024. He is a member of the African National Congress.

== Background ==
Radebe was born on 4 November 1965. He has a Bachelor of Physical Education from the University of Zululand and a Master of Business Administration from Nelson Mandela University.

He was president of the Thembalihle Youth Congress. Radebe also served as the chairperson of the Thembalihle African National Congress branch and later as the regional chairperson of the ANC's Frankfort region.

== Parliamentary career ==
First elected in 1999 and re-elected subsequently, Radebe sat on a number of parliamentary committees, including the Portfolio Committee on International Relations and Cooperation, the Portfolio Committee on Trade and Industry, the Portfolio Committee on Public Works, and the Portfolio Committee on Agriculture and Land. From June 2019 until May 2024, Radebe sat on the Joint Standing Committee on Financial Management of Parliament.

Radebe did not stand in the 2024 general election and left parliament.
