= Africa Genome Education Institute =

Organization for genetics education in Africa

- Abbreviation: AGEI
- Location: Claremont, Western Cape, South Africa

The Africa Genome Education Institute (AGEI) is a public forum focusing on genetics and biotechnology in the African continent. It has organised major genome related events and conferences in Stellenbosch (2003), Cairo (2004), Nairobi (2005), Somerset West (2006). The AGEI's executive director is Prof Wilmot James.

The AGEI received a $50,000 grant (October 1, 2007 - October 31, 2009) from the Charles Stewart Mott Foundation to understand race and skin colour.
