= Nomsa Kubheka =

South African politician

Member of the National Assembly of South Africa
- In office 22 May 2019 – 28 May 2024

Personal details
- Born: Nomsa Josephina Kubheka; 29 December 1970 (age 55)
- Party: African National Congress
- Profession: Politician

Nomsa Josephina Kubheka (born 29 December 1970) is a South African politician and a former Member of the National Assembly of South Africa. She is a member of the African National Congress.

== Parliamentary career ==
A member of the African National Congress, Kubheka stood as an ANC parliamentary candidate from the Free State in the 2019 general election and was subsequently elected to the National Assembly and sworn in on 22 May 2019. In June 2019, she was named to the Portfolio Committee on Communications.

In February 2020, Kubheka was part of a delegation of ten female ANC MPs that went to Public Protector Busisiwe Mkhwebane's Pretoria residence to "offer support". She said:

We went to show our support. We must not allow our women to persecuted for doing their jobs well. We are not going to support a motion by the opposition to remove the public protector.

Kubheka was not re-elected to Parliament at the 2024 general election.
