= James Letuka =

South African politician

Member of the Free State Provincial Legislature
- In office 21 May 2014 – 28 May 2024

Personal details
- Born: Lehlohonolo James Letuka
- Party: Democratic Alliance
- Profession: Politician

Lehlohonolo James Letuka is a South African politician who served as a Member of the Free State Provincial Legislature for the Democratic Alliance from May 2014 until May 2024. Letuka is the father of Patricia Kopane, the party's former provincial leader in the Free State.

== Biography ==
Letuka was involved in the Black Consciousness Movement during the establishment of the South African Student Congress.

Letuka joined the Democratic Alliance and was elected to the Free State Provincial Legislature at the provincial election on 7 May 2014. The DA was accused of nepotism, since Letuka is the father of the party's provincial leader Patricia Kopane. Letuka dismissed the allegations. He was sworn in as a member of the provincial legislature (MPL) on 21 May 2014 and the party appointed him as their caucus chairperson.

In March 2016, the DA selected him as their mayoral candidate for the Mangaung Metropolitan Municipality ahead of national municipal elections. The African National Congress retained control of the municipality and Letuka remained an MPL.

Letuka was re-elected for a second term as a provincial legislature member in 2019. Letuka left the provincial legislature in May 2024.
