= Salam Abram =

South African politician

Member of the National Assembly
- In office 1999–2014

Personal details
- Born: Salamuddi Abram
- Other political affiliations: African National Congress; United Democratic Movement

Salamuddi (Salam) Abram is a retired South African politician. He served as a member of Parliament from 1999 until 2014.

== Career ==
Abram became chairperson of the Actonville Town Council liaison committee in 1964. The following year, he was appointed chairperson of the Actonville Consultative Committee. Abram served as a member of the South African Indian Council in 1974.

He served on the steering committee of the president's council, under the chairpersonship of the previous vice president, Alwyn Schlebusch, in 1981. In 1992 Abram was elected as a presiding officer of parliament and chairperson of the House of Delegates, a body in the Tricameral Parliament that was reserved for Indian South Africans. He was elected to the Benoni Town Council in 1993. In 1995 Abram was elected to the Greater Benoni Council and was appointed to serve on the executive committee.

Abram joined the United Democratic Movement in 1997. He was then elected as a Member of Parliament in the 1999 general election. In 2003 he was approached by the national chairperson of the African National Congress, Mosioua Lekota, to join the ANC. He joined the party the next year and was returned to parliament on the party list after that year's general election. Abrams was then assigned to the agriculture and land affairs portfolio committee. He was re-elected to Parliament in 2009. Abram was an outspoken critic of the minister of agriculture, Tina Joemat-Peterson, who was also from the ANC.

Prior to the 2014 general election, Abram resigned from the ANC and quit politics altogether.

== Personal life ==
Abram lives in Benoni, Gauteng.
