= Nthabiseng Mosia =

South African-Ghanaian entrepreneur

- Born: Ghana
- Citizenship: South African-Ghanaian
- Education: University of Cape Town (BSc, Finance and Economics); School of International and Public Affairs, Columbia University (Master's, Clean Energy Finance and Policy)
- Occupations: Entrepreneur, business executive
- Known for: Co-founder of Easy Solar, providing affordable solar energy in Sierra Leone
- Awards: 2021 Bloomberg New Economy Catalyst; 2020 Forbes Woman Africa Gen Y Award; 2019 Social Entrepreneur of the Year (World Economic Forum & Schwab Foundation); 2019 Forbes Africa 30 Under 30 (Tech); 2018 Forbes 30 Most Promising Young Entrepreneurs in Africa; 2018 Quartz Africa 30 Pioneers; 2017 100 Most Influential Young People in South Africa (Avance Media); 2017 200 Top Young South Africans (Mail & Guardian)
- Website: Easy Solar

Nthabiseng Mosia is a South African-Ghanaian entrepreneur and co-founder of the Sierra Leone–based solar energy company Easy Solar.

== Early life and education ==
Mosia was born in Ghana, later moving to South Africa. As a teenager she occasionally experienced blackouts due to unreliable supply of electricity, which first sparked her interest in energy. Mosia gained a Bachelor of Business Science in Finance and Economics from the University of Cape Town, graduating with first class honors and distinction, subsequently working as a management consultant across Africa. In 2016 she studied for a Master's degree focused on Clean Energy Finance and Policy at the School of International and Public Affairs, Columbia University, where she met her co-founders of Easy Solar, Eric Silverman and Alexandre Tourre.

== Career ==
Mosia and her co-founders conceived of the idea for providing reliable and affordable electricity to households underserved by the grid in West Africa, during their graduate studies. Together they won major funding for the project from competitions and hackathons in the US, such as the D-Prize in 2015 and the Columbia Venture Competition 2016. Initial funding allowed Mosia and her colleagues to conduct a survey of energy availability across 1,500 Sierra Leonean households.

Easy Solar, trading internationally as Azimuth, was created in 2016 as a commercial initiative to extend the reach of high-quality solar energy devices (such as lanterns and home systems) across under-provided Sierra Leone. The company offers financial initiatives, such as rent-to-own, on a pay-as-you-go basis to help poorer households afford their own solar panels.

Studies indicate that as few as one in a hundred rural households in Sierra Leone have access to electricity. Since the company was established Easy Solar claims to have provided 30,000 households with electricity. The company plans to expand the business soon into neighbouring Liberia and Guinea.

Mosia is also an advocate for expanding opportunities for African women.

== Recognition ==
- 2021: Bloomberg New Economy Catalyst.
- 2020: Forbes Woman Africa Gen Y Award.
- 2019: Social Entrepreneur of the Year by the World Economic Forum and Schwab Foundation
- 2019: Forbes Africa 30 Under 30 (Tech Category)
- 2018: 30 Most Promising Young Entrepreneurs in Africa 2018 by Forbes
- 2018: 30 Africa Pioneers by Quartz
- 2017: 100 Most Influential Young People in South Africa by Avance media.
- 2017: 200 Top Young South Africans by Mail & Guardian.
