= Nthabiseng Khunou =

South African politician (born 1969)

Member of the National Assembly
- In office 2003 – 7 May 2019
- Constituency: Free State

Personal details
- Born: 21 December 1969 (age 56)
- Citizenship: South Africa
- Party: African National Congress

Nthabiseng Pauline Khunou (born 21 December 1969) is a South African politician from the Free State. She represented the African National Congress (ANC) in the National Assembly from 2003 to 2019 and formerly served in the Free State Provincial Legislature.

== Political career ==
Born on 21 December 1969, Khunou was a student activist and later served as a local councillor in the Motheo District Municipality. In the 1999 general election, she was elected to an ANC seat in the Free State Provincial Legislature. However, she served less than a term in her seat; in 2003, she was transferred to the National Assembly to fill a casual vacancy. She was elected to her first full term in the assembly in the general election of the following year, serving the Free State constituency, and subsequently gained re-election to further terms in 2009 and 2014.

At the outset of her last term in Parliament in 2014, the ANC appointed her as its whip in the Multi-Party Women's Caucus, then chaired by Storey Morutoa. In addition, in 2018, she was elected to chair the Standing Committee on the Auditor-General after the incumbent, Vincent Smith, stepped aside to confront corruption allegations. Khunou was also active in the Free State branch of the ANC Women's League and, as a Christian pastor, in the National Interfaith Leadership Council.
