= Adhir Kalyan =

South African actor (born 1983)

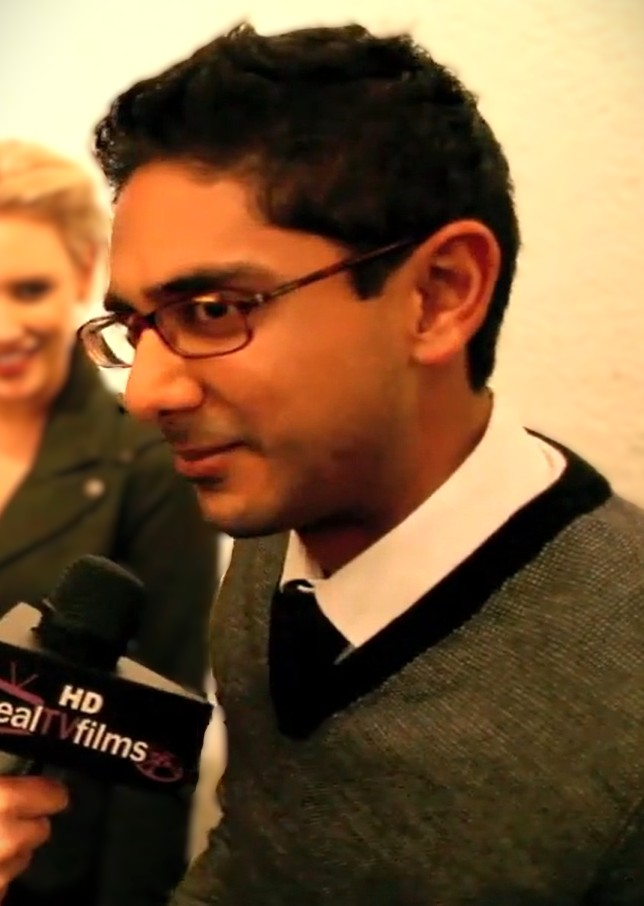
- Kalyan in 2010
- Occupation: Actor
- Years active: 2004–present
- Spouse: Emily Wilson (m. 2016)
- Children: 2
- Mother: Sandy Kalyan

Adhir Kalyan is a South African actor noted for his role as Timmy in the CBS sitcom Rules of Engagement and as Awalmir Karimi/'Al' in United States of Al.

== Early life ==
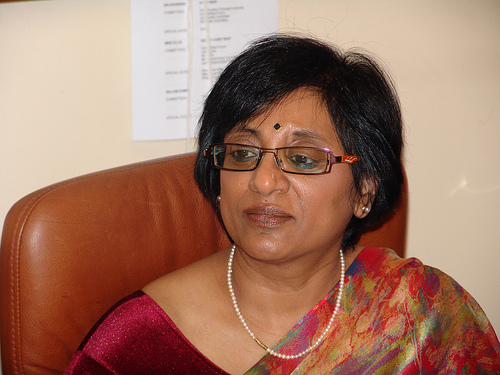
Sandy Kalyan circa 2011

Kalyan's family is of Indian South African descent. His mother, Santosh Vinita "Sandy" Kalyan, was a member of Parliament in the South African National Assembly, where she represented the Democratic Alliance.

Kalyan completed his schooling at Marklands in Durban. Prior to moving abroad, he performed in a number of productions in South Africa, including theatrical adaptations of Charles Dickens' Oliver Twist and A Christmas Carol, an adaptation of Salman Rushdie's The Ground Beneath Her Feet, and the classical Shakespearean play Macbeth.

== Career ==
In 2005, Kalyan moved to London to pursue his acting career where he gained roles in the BBC series Holby City (series 8) as Arjmand Younis, in Spooks (series 5), and on the Irish network RTÉ One in Fair City as Ramal Kirmani. Kalyan also appeared in a number of independent films.

Kalyan starred in the short-lived American CW Television Network sitcom Aliens in America, as a foreign exchange student from Pakistan living with a Wisconsin family. He portrayed recurring characters in the fifth season of the cable show Nip/Tuck, and in the third season of the CBS sitcom Rules of Engagement, becoming a series regular in the latter's fourth season.

In 2009, Kalyan appeared in the film Paul Blart: Mall Cop as Pahud, a teenager who admired his girlfriend Parisa, in Up in the Air as a fired employee, and in the cheerleader comedy Fired Up. In 2010, he appeared in Youth in Revolt, and in 2011, he appeared in a minor role in No Strings Attached.

In late 2015, he began starring in the Fox science fiction crime drama Second Chance.

In December 2019, Kalyan was cast to portray Afghan interpreter Awalmir Karimi ("Al"), the main protagonist in the CBS sitcom United States of Al. The sitcom premiered on 1 April 2021, surrounded with controversy. Released to mostly negative reviews, the show and its makers were criticized for the show's humor, use of antiquated tropes, and in particular, critics called out the casting of a South-African-born Indian actor to play an Afghan lead and his use of an inauthentic accent. However, the show was praised by some for its attempts to diversify television, and for the cultural representation of its main character.

== Personal life ==
In March 2015, he became engaged to actress Emily Wilson of General Hospital. He and Wilson married on October 1, 2016, at Colony 29 in Palm Springs, California. They welcomed their first child together, a daughter, who was born on March 23, 2021. They welcomed their second child, a son, on October 11, 2024.

== Filmography ==
Year	Title	Type	Role	Notes
2006	Holby City	TV series	Arjmand Younis	1 episode
2006–2007	Fair City	TV series	Ramal Kirmani	
2007–2008	Aliens in America	TV series	Raja	Starring role
2009	Paul Blart: Mall Cop	Feature	Pahud	
2009	Fired Up!	Feature	Brewster	
2009	Up in the Air	Feature	Irate IT worker	
2009	Nip/Tuck	TV series	Raj Paresh	3 episodes
2009	Youth in Revolt	Feature	Vijay Joshi	
2009–2013	Rules of Engagement	TV series	Timmy	Recurring (Season 3); Main cast (Seasons 4–7); 70 episodes
2010	High School	Feature	Sebastian Saleem	
2011	No Strings Attached	Feature	Kevin	
2015	Paul Blart: Mall Cop 2	Feature	Pahud	Cameo
2016	Second Chance	TV series	Otto Goodwin	Starring role
2018-2019	Arrested Development	TV series	Adhir	3 episodes
2020	A Nice Girl Like You	Feature	Paul Goodwin	
2020	Broken Promises 5	Feature	Bushknife Bobby	
2020	The Goldbergs	TV series	Dodd Wembley	Episode: "It's All About Comptrol"
2021–2022	United States of Al	TV series	Awalmir "Al" Karimi	Main cast
2022	Bob Hearts Abishola	TV series	Jared	Episode: "Inner Boss Bitch"
2023	Not Dead Yet	TV series	Keith	Episode: "Not Feeling It Yet"
2023	Broken Promises 6	Feature	Bushknife Bobby	Starring role
2025	9-1-1: Nashville	TV series	Stuart Pearson	Episode: "Hell and High Water"
2026	NCIS	TV series	Interrogator	Episode: "All Good Things"
