= Mike Ellis (South African politician) =

South African politician (born 1946)

Michael James Ellis MP
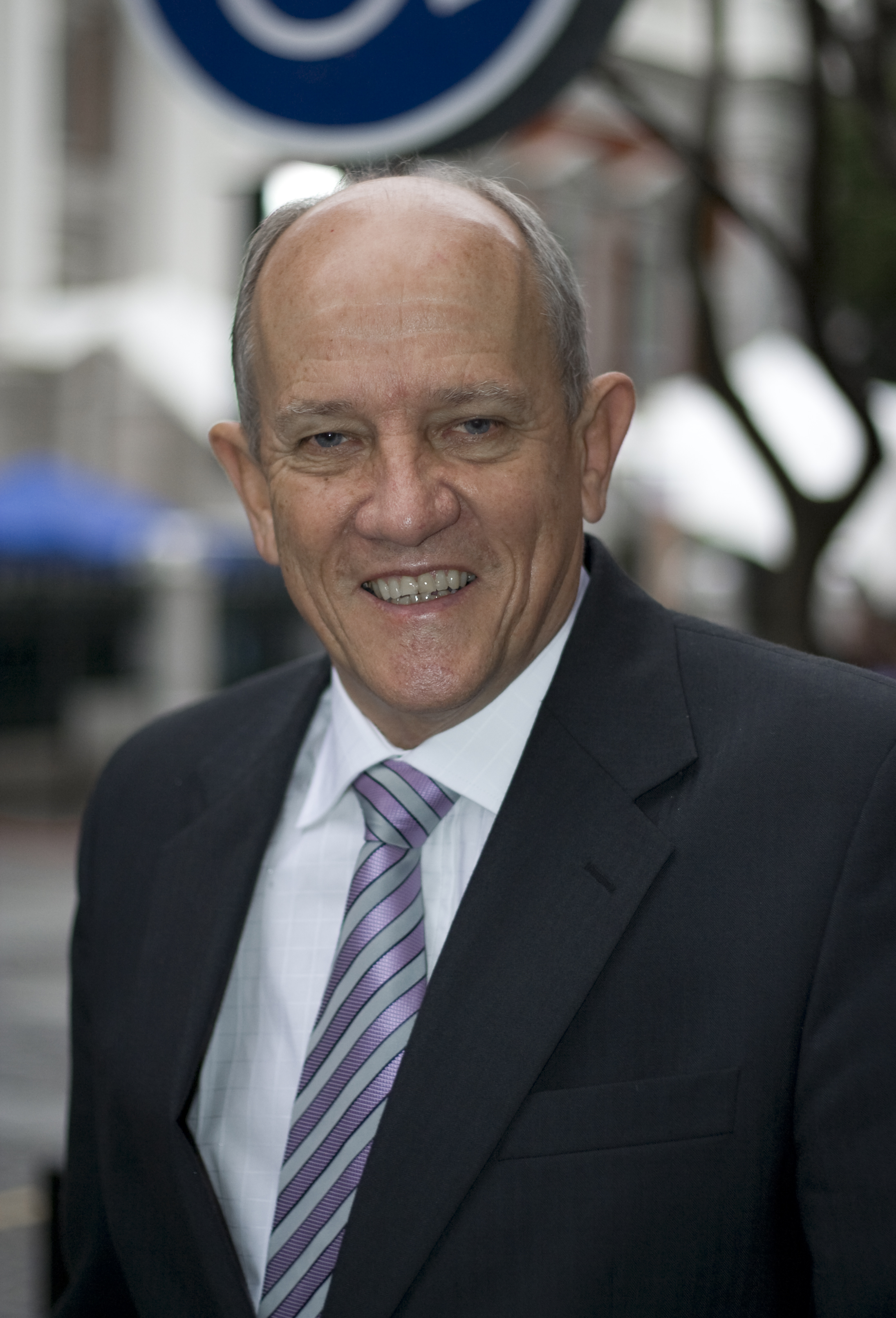

Deputy Chief Whip of the Opposition
- In office 1999–2011
- Leader: Tony Leon and Helen Zille
- Succeeded by: Sandy Kalyan

Member of Parliament for KwaZulu-Natal
- In office 1994–2011
- Preceded by: constituency created
- Succeeded by: multi-member seat

Member of Parliament for Durban North
- In office 1987–1994
- Preceded by: Ronald Miller
- Succeeded by: constituency abolished

Personal details
- Born: Pietermaritzburg
- Party: Democratic Alliance (2000-present); Democratic Party (1989-2000); Progressive Federal Party (pre-1989)
- Profession: Educator

Michael James Ellis (born 29 September 1946) is a retired South African politician and educator, who served as Deputy Chief Whip of the opposition Democratic Alliance in 1999-2011, and as the party's provincial leader in KwaZulu-Natal between 2006 and 2009. Ellis is one of the party's longest serving Parliamentarians, having first entered parliament as a candidate of the pro-Democracy Progressive Federal Party in 1987. Prior to that he was President of the Natal Teachers' Society, and served as headmaster and deputy headmaster at several KwaZulu-Natal schools.

== Background ==
Ellis was born in Pietermaritzburg, and attended Northlands Boys High School and the University of Natal. He graduated with a BA in History and Political Science, and also obtained a University Education Diploma. He later also obtained a B.Ed degree. Upon graduating, Ellis worked as a teacher at Beachwood High School, which later became Northwood School. In 1976 he took up a post as deputy headmaster at Penzance Primary School, and after spending two years as deputy headmaster at Kingsway High School, returned to Penzance to become the school's headmaster. In 1984 he returned to another of his former schools, Beachwood, as head teacher. He was also appointed President of the Natal Teachers' Society.

== Parliamentarian ==
In 1987 Ellis left teaching to enter a career in politics. He won a seat in the House of Assembly in the Durban North constituency, under the banner of the Progressive Federal Party, and then won the seat again in 1989 under the party's new name, the Democratic Party. Ellis was reelected to Parliament in 1994, in the country's first democratic election. In 1995 he became a party whip in the National Assembly, and he was appointed Deputy Chief Whip in 1999 - a position he held for more than a decade.

During his tenure in Parliament, Ellis served on numerous portfolio committees, including Health, Education and Environmental Affairs and Tourism.

Ellis retired from Parliament in 2011, and was given a warm farewell by parliament, from opposition and government MPs alike.

== Family ==
Mike's eldest son, John Ellis, is a well-known South African singer-songwriter and guitarist. His debut solo album, Come Out Fighting, released in June 2010, has a strong political message. It was dubbed 'Protest Songs' by the local press. Songs such as 'A Luta Continua', 'Government Song', 'Rebels' and 'Rant' speak about being a white South African post-Apartheid.

== Offices held ==
Political offices
Preceded by ?	South African Deputy Chief Whip of the Opposition; 1999 – 2011	Succeeded by Sandy Kalyan
