= Dikeledi Direko =

South African politician

Dikeledi Direko MP

Member of the National Assembly of South Africa
- Incumbent
- Assumed office 22 May 2019
- Constituency: Free State

Personal details
- Born: Dikeledi Rosemary Direko; 28 April 1985 (age 41)
- Party: African National Congress
- Education: Phehello Senior Secondary School; Health Advance Institute
- Occupation: Member of Parliament
- Profession: Politician

Dikeledi Rosemary Direko (born 28 April 1985) is a South African politician from the Free State who has served as a Member of the National Assembly of South Africa since 2019. Direko is a member of the African National Congress.

== Early life and education ==
Direko was born on 28 April 1985. She matriculated from Phehello Senior Secondary School. She obtained a Project Management Programme (NQF Level 4) at the Health Advance Institute and holds a diploma in public relations management. Direko is currently studying for a diploma in local government law & administration from the University of Fort Hare.

== Political career ==
Direko was an executive committee member of the African National Congress Youth League's Sipho Mutsi Branch from 2005 to 2008 and served as the branch secretary for one year from 2008 to 2009. She also served on the ANC youth league's Lejweleputswa regional executive committee from 2009 to 2011. From 2014 to 2015, she was the provincial secretary of the ANC Youth League.

In the African National Congress, she was a branch executive committee member of the ANC Sipho Mutsi branch from 2008 to 2011. In 2011, she was elected deputy branch chair and served until 2014. Direko was elected to the ANC Lejweleputswa Regional Executive Committee and the National Executive Committee of the ANC Youth League in 2015.

== Parliamentary career ==
Direko stood as an ANC parliamentary candidate from the Free State in the 2019 general elections, and was subsequently elected to the National Assembly and sworn in on 22 May 2019.

During the Sixth Parliament (2019–2024), Direko was a member of the Portfolio Committee on Cooperative Governance and Traditional Affairs.

Direko was re-elected to Parliament in the 2024 general election.
