= Lawrence McDonald (South African politician) =

South African politician

Member of the National Assembly of South Africa
- In office 22 May 2019 – 28 May 2024

Personal details
- Born: Lawrence Edward McDonald; 15 February 1966 (age 60)
- Party: African National Congress
- Occupation: Member of Parliament
- Profession: Politician

Lawrence Edward McDonald (born 15 February 1966) is a South African politician who served as a Member of the National Assembly from May 2019 until May 2024.

== Parliamentary career ==
McDonald is a member of the African National Congress. He was 8th on the party's regional Free State election list for the general election of 8 May 2019. Following the election, he was sworn in as a Member of the National Assembly on 22 May 2019. McDonald became a member of the Portfolio Committee on Transport on 27 June.

On 2 July 2019, he nominated Mosebenzi Zwane to become chairperson of the transport committee.

McDonald did not stand for reelection in the 2024 general election.

== Post-Parliament ==
McDonald formally resigned from the ANC in 2025 after dispute and formal eviction proceedings with his residence in a subsidised parliamentary village. McDonald would subsequently be granted refugee status under Mission South Africa to the United States, and now resides in Florida.
