= Sandra Botha =

South African politician (born 1945)

Ambassador of South Africa to the Czech Republic
- In office August 2009 – June 2013

Leader of the Opposition
- In office 5 May 2007 – 9 May 2009
- Preceded by: Tony Leon
- Succeeded by: Athol Trollip

House Chairperson of the National Assembly of South Africa
- In office 2004-2009

Personal details
- Born: 25 February 1945 (age 81) Viljoenskroon, Orange Free State, South Africa
- Party: Democratic Alliance
- Spouse: Andries Botha
- Children: 5

Celia-Sandra Botha (born 25 February 1945) is a South African politician, who served as South Africa's Ambassador to the Czech Republic. She is the former Leader of the Opposition, on behalf of the Democratic Alliance and its leader, Helen Zille, in the National Assembly of South Africa.

She announced her intention to step down from the position after the 2009 South African general election, to become an ambassador. Her term in Prague ended in June 2013. She will reportedly not seek a leadership position in South Africa, but will participate in political life, and be part of the "battle of ideas".

== Early life and career ==
Born to an Afrikaner farming family in Viljoenskroon, Orange Free State, as early as the 1960s, Botha convinced local farmers to employ a social worker to service the needs of the rural black families. She also held talks with the Citrus Board for further winter aid for farmworkers.

Having matriculated from Parys High School, Botha went on to complete a year in New York with the aid of a scholarship. Later she obtained a BA degree in economics at Stellenbosch University.

She is married to a farmer and former MP Andries Johannes Botha and the couple have five children and five grandchildren. Shortly after the marriage, Botha embarked on a Sesotho and linguistics degree at UNISA.

Botha also became heavily involved in the anti-apartheid movement. Along with Helen Zille, Botha was a part of the Black Sash movement.

She is not related to former president P.W. Botha or former foreign minister Pik Botha.

Botha was elected to the National Council of the Provinces for the Democratic Party in 1999. She served as the party's caucus leader from 2000 to 2004.

== Leader of the Opposition in the National Assembly ==
In May 2007, Sandra Botha was elected by the Democratic Alliance as their representative and official Leader of the Opposition. Botha gained a majority over former NP cabinet minister, Tertius Delport.

Prior to her stepping down from Parliament in 2009, Botha had challenged the government on many issues. In particular, Botha was vocal about her dissatisfaction following a scandal where four white doctors in the Western Cape relocated overseas. South Africa's controversial affirmative action policies had allegedly prevented them from working in government hospitals, despite a shortage of doctors and many vacancies in the province. Then-president Thabo Mbeki denied that this was the case and rebuked Botha for making serious allegations against him based on one newspaper article. Botha has also called for a major overhaul of the education system.
