= List of members of the 6th Free State Provincial Legislature =

6th Free State Provincial Legislature
←	5th Legislature	7th Legislature	→
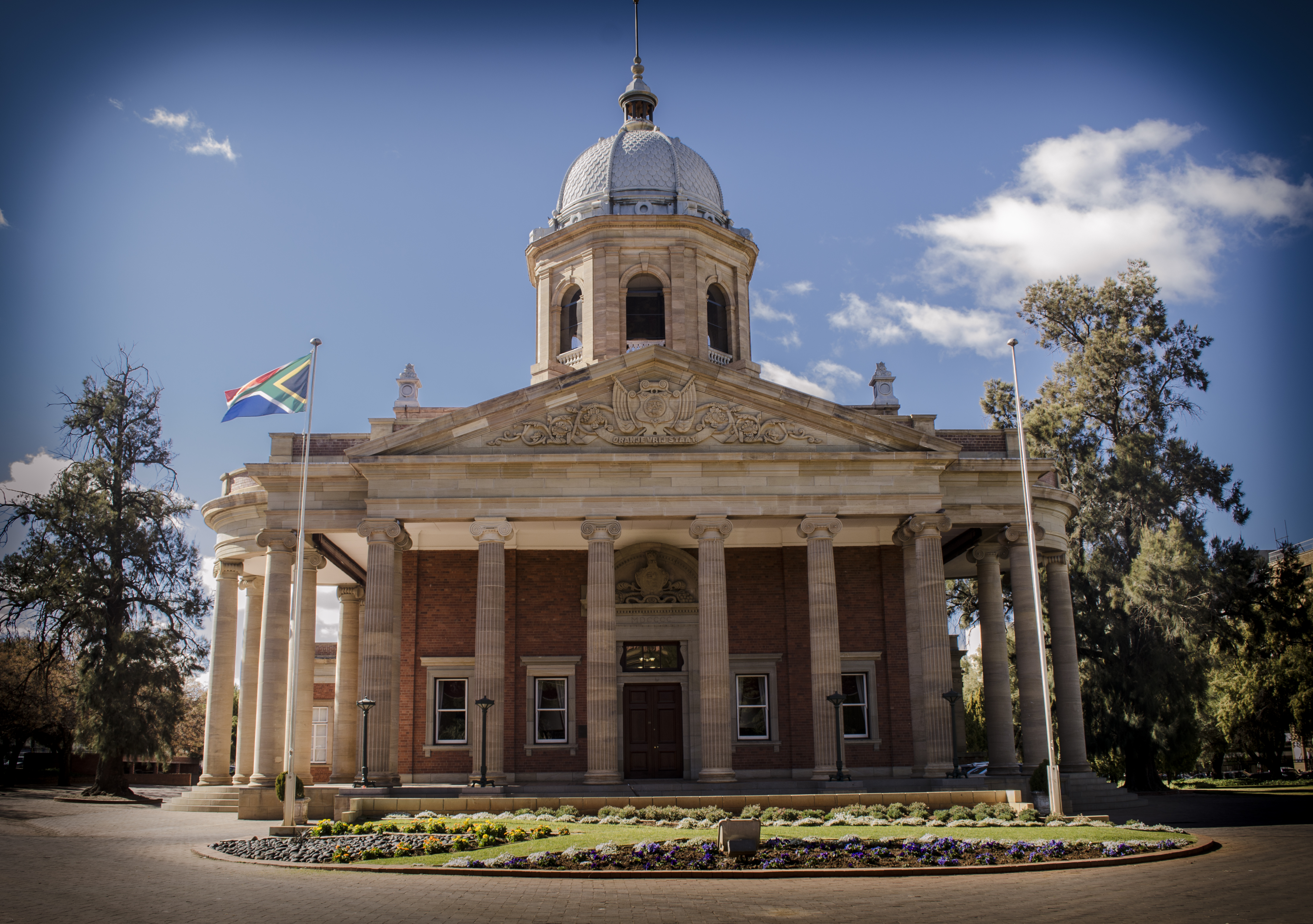
- Fourth Raadsaal, Bloemfontein

Overview
- Legislative body: Free State Provincial Legislature
- Jurisdiction: Free State, South Africa
- Meeting place: Fourth Raadsaal
- Term: 22 May 2019 – 28 May 2024
- Election: 8 May 2019
- Members: 30
- Speaker: Zanele Sifuba
- Deputy Speaker: Lucy Mapena
- Premier: Mxolisi Dukwana
- Leader of the Opposition: Roy Jankielsohn

This is a list of members of the sixth Free State Provincial Legislature, as elected in the election of 8 May 2019 and taking into account changes in membership since the election. The legislature dissolved on 28 May 2024 and was succeeded by the 7th legislature.

== Current composition ==
Party	Seats
African National Congress	19
DA	6
Economic Freedom Fighters	4
VF+	1
Total	30

== Graphical representation ==
This is a graphical comparison of party strengths as they are in the 6th Free State Provincial Legislature.

- Note this is not the official seating plan of the Free State Provincial Legislature.

== Members ==
Name	Party	Position
Gadija Brown	ANC	Member
William Bulwane	ANC	Member
Armand Cloete	FF+	Member
Mxolisi Dukwana	ANC	Premier
Roy Jankielsohn	DA	Member
David Janse van Vuuren	DA	Member
Leona Kleynhans	DA	Member
Motshidise Koloi	ANC	Member
Mathabo Leeto	ANC	Member
Maqueen Letsoha-Mathae	ANC	Member
James Letuka	DA	Member
Mapheule Liphoko	EFF	Member
Limakatso Mahasa	ANC	Member
Dibolelo Mahlatsi	ANC	Member
Ishmael Majake	EFF	Member
Toto Makume	ANC	Member
Lucy Mapena	ANC	Deputy Speaker
Sam Mashinini	ANC	Member
Thabo Meeko	ANC	Member
Makalo Mohale	ANC	Member
Jafta Mokoena	DA	Member
Malitaba Moleleki	ANC	Member
Malefane Msimanga	EFF	Member
Lirampele Nanyane	EFF	Member
Thembeni Nxangisa	ANC	Member
Mariette Pittaway	DA	Member
Motlagomang Qabathe	ANC	Member
Zanele Sifuba	ANC	Speaker
Montseng Ts'Iu	ANC	Member
Vusimusi Tshabalala	ANC	Chief Whip

In October 2022, Polediso Motsoeneng was sworn in to replace Heinrich Smit, who had died the previous month. However, in subsequent months, Motsoeneng resigned, as did Jabulane Radebe and former Premier Sisi Ntombela, while Tate Makgoe died. They were replaced in March 2023 by four new ANC representatives: Toto Makume, Dibolelo Mahlatsi, Mathabo Leeto, and Maqueen Letsoha-Mathae.

On the opposition benches, Karabo Khakhau resigned in November 2022 and was replaced by Jafta Mokoena; and Mandisa Makesini resigned in January 2023 and was replaced by Mapheule Liphoko.
