= List of members of the 7th Free State Provincial Legislature =

7th Free State Provincial Legislature
←	6th Legislature	8th Legislature	→
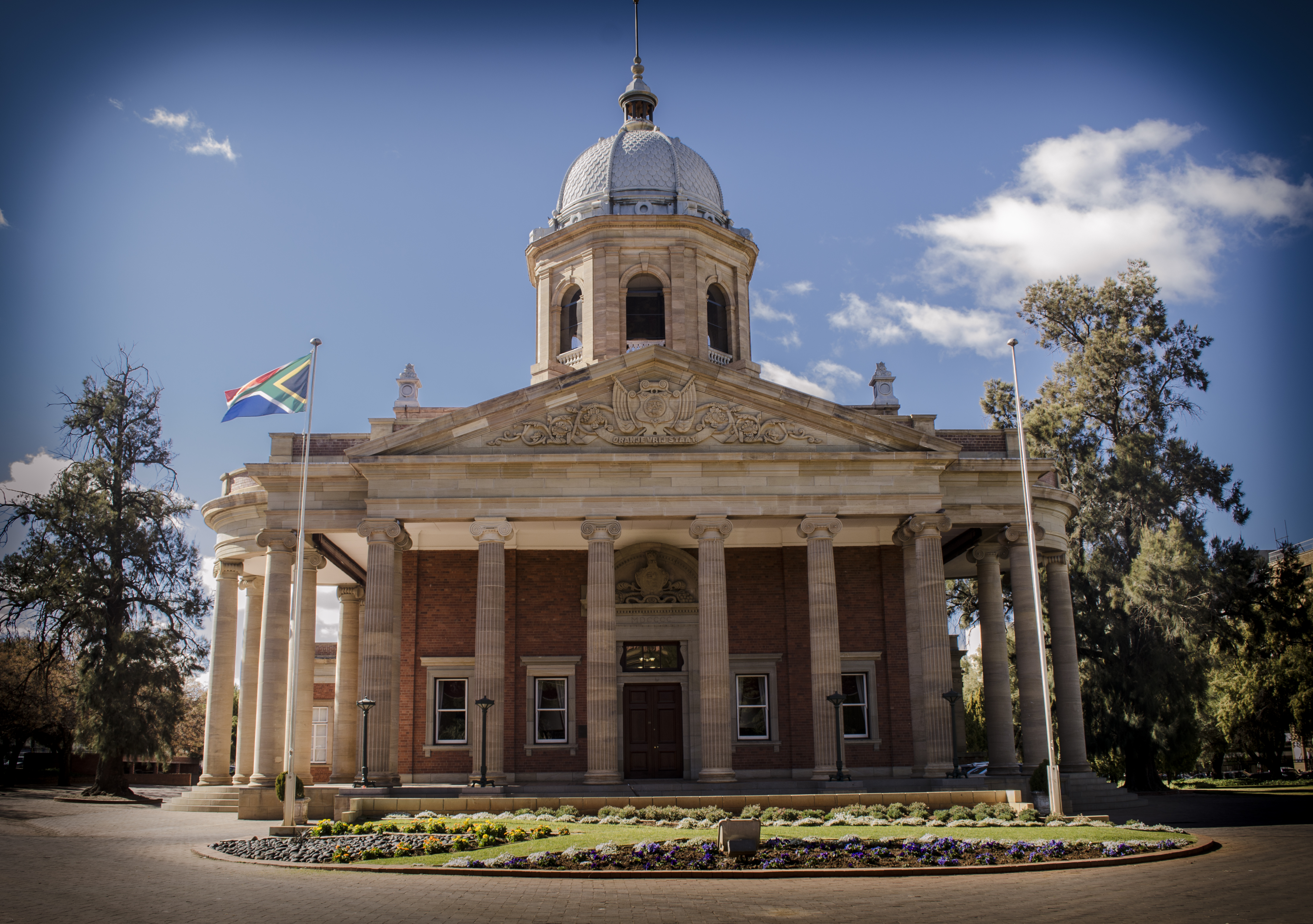
- Fourth Raadsaal, Bloemfontein

Overview
- Legislative body: Free State Provincial Legislature
- Jurisdiction: Free State, South Africa
- Meeting place: Fourth Raadsaal
- Term: 14 June 2024 –
- Election: 28 May 2024
- Members: 30
- Speaker: Mxolisi Dukwana
- Deputy Speaker: Nolitha Ndungane
- Premier: Maqueen Letsoha-Mathae
- Leader of the Opposition: Roy Jankielsohn

Since June 2024, the Free State Provincial Legislature has consisted of 30 members from six political parties, elected on 28 May 2024 in the South African general election. The ruling African National Congress retained its majority by winning 16 out of the 30 seats. The Democratic Alliance is the official opposition, having won seven seats, one more than in the previous legislative term. The Economic Freedom Fighters retained their four seats at the election. Three parties, the Freedom Front Plus, uMkhonto weSizwe, and the African Congress for Transformation hold one seat in the legislature each.

The legislature met on 14 June 2024 to elect office-bearers. Maqueen Letsoha-Mathae was elected Premier of the Free State, while Zanele Sifuba was re-elected as speaker. Julia Maboya was elected deputy speaker. However, less than a week later Sifuba and Maboya were appointed to serve in the Executive Council, which resulted in them resigning as speaker and deputy speaker, respectively. The legislature then met on 26 June to elect their replacements which saw former premier Mxolisi Dukwana elected as speaker, while Nolitha Ndungane was elected deputy speaker.

== Current composition ==

- Note that this is not an official seating chart.

Party	Seats
African National Congress	16
DA	7
EFF	4
VF+	1
MK	1
ACT	1
Total	30

== Members ==
Name	Party	Position
Armand Cloete	VF+	Member
Mxolisi Dukwana	ANC	Member
Molefi Foko	MK	Member
Nthabiseng Garekoe	ANC	Member
Roy Jankielsohn	DA	Leader of the Opposition
David Janse van Vuuren	DA	Member
Oupa Khoabane	ANC	Member
Dulandi Leech	DA	Member
Mathabo Leeto	ANC	Member
Maqueen Letsoha-Mathae	ANC	Premier
Mapheule Liphoko	EFF	Member
Mantlhake Maboya	ANC	Member
Monyatso Mahlatsi	ANC	Member
Dibolelo Mahlatsi	ANC	Member
Ketso Makume	ANC	Member
David Masoeu	DA	Member
Jabu Mbalula	ANC	Member
David McKay	DA	Member
Thabo Meeko	ANC	Member
Mamiki Mkhabela	ATM	Member
Jafta Mokoena	DA	Member
Saki Mokoena	ANC	Member
Malefane Msimanga	EFF	Member
Jemina Nanyane	EFF	Member
Nolitha Ndungane	ANC	Member
Werner Pretorius	DA	Member
Elzabe Rockman	ANC	Member
Zanele Sifuba	ANC	Member
Zama Sigwabela	ANC	Member
Maliba Tshabalala	EFF	Member

== Membership changes and replacements ==
Following the death of African Congress for Transformation MPL David Mkhabela in August 2025, his wife, Mamiki Mkhabela was selected to take up the ACT seat in the provincial legislature.
