= List of members of the 4th Free State Provincial Legislature =

This is a list of members of the fourth Free State Provincial Legislature as elected in the election of 22 April 2009. In that election, the African National Congress (ANC) retained a diminished majority in the legislature, winning 22 of 30 seats. The ANC's Ace Magashule was elected as Premier of the Free State.

The Congress of the People (COPE), a newly established party, usurped the status of the Democratic Alliance (DA) as official opposition in the legislature; of COPE's four representatives, two – Casca Mokitlane and Gertrude Mothupi – had previously represented the ANC in the legislature. The DA retained three seats and the Freedom Front Plus (FF+) retained a single seat; the African Christian Democratic Party, however, lost its representation in the legislature.

== Composition ==
Party	Seats
African National Congress	22
Congress of the People	4
Democratic Alliance	3
VF+	1
Total	30

== Members ==
The table below lists the Members of the Free State Provincial Legislature as elected in April 2009. It does not take into account changes in the composition of the legislature after the election.

Member	Party
Mxolisi Dukwana	ANC
Dan Kgothule	ANC
Sisi Mabe	ANC
Ace Magashule	ANC
Sindiswa Thelmonia Magwandana	ANC
Sibongile Pearm Makae	ANC
Tate Makgoe	ANC
Peter Maloka	ANC
Thabo Manyoni	ANC
Olly Mlamleli	ANC
Susan Mnumzana	ANC
Seiso Mohai	ANC
Fezi Ngubentombi	ANC
Sisi Ntombela	ANC
Pheello Parkies	ANC
Mamiki Qabathe	ANC
Maureen Scheepers	ANC
Moeketsi Sesele	ANC
Mantoa Thoabala	ANC
Ouma Tsopo	ANC
Cornelis Johannes van Rooyen	ANC
Mosebenzi Zwane	ANC
Isaac Mzwandile Hleko	COPE
Moshoeshoe Aboram Likotsi	COPE
Casca Mokitlane	COPE
Gertrude Mothupi	COPE
Basil Alexander	DA
Peter Frewen	DA
Roy Jankielsohn	DA
Abrie Oosthuizen	FF+
