= Gadija Brown =

South African politician

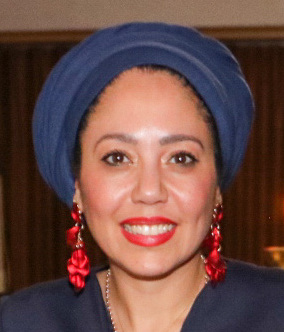
- Brown in November 2022

Free State MEC for Finance
- In office 28 May 2019 – 14 June 2024
- Premier: Mxolisi Dukwana; Sisi Ntombela
- Preceded by: Elzabe Rockman
- Succeeded by: Ketso Makume

Member of the Free State Provincial Legislature
- In office 22 May 2019 – 28 May 2024

Personal details
- Party: African National Congress
- Education: University of the Free State

Gadija Brown is a South African politician and banker who was a member of the Free State Provincial Legislature for the African National Congress (ANC) and the provincial Member of the Executive Council (MEC) for Finance.

== Background ==
In 2011, Brown achieved a bachelor's degree in business management and leadership from the University of the Free State. She also holds various certificates in business banking, leadership programme, banking and computer programming A+. Brown worked in the business and banking sector for 19 years.

She was chief financial officer, deputy director general for economic development and subsequently, head of department at the provincial Department of Economic, Small Business Development, Tourism and Environmental Affairs. On 1 April 2018, she became the head of department at the Department of Public Works and Infrastructure.

== Political career ==
She has served the African National Congress as a representative in the economic cluster, the provincial cluster, the policy conference on the economy, and the land summit.

For the 2019 Free State Provincial Legislature election, Brown was the 13th candidate on the ANC list. She won a seat in the provincial legislature at the election. After the election, she was mentioned as a premier candidate by the ANC Provincial Executive Committee. The ANC's National Executive Council (NEC) chose incumbent premier Sisi Ntombela. Shortly afterwards, Brown was appointed Member of the Executive Council for Finance by Ntombela.

After the Free State provincial treasury awarded contracts worth R2,7-million to the sons of Ace Magashule, former Free State premier and secretary-general of the ANC, in July 2020, Brown was accused of being close to Magashule. Magashule denied this accusation. Magashule's two sons, Tshepiso Magashule and Thato Magashule, have been cleared of any wrongdoing by the Special Investigating Unit (SIU) following its investigations into the provincial government's personal protective equipment (PPE) procurement.

On 14 March 2023, Mxolisi Dukwana, who was elected premier the previous month, appointed his Executive Council which saw Brown remain as MEC for Finance.

Brown was not ranked on the ANC's provincial list for the 2024 provincial election and left the legislature at the election. Ketso Makume succeeded her as the MEC for Finance, Tourism and Economic Development.

In April 2025, Brown was appointed as a special economic advisor to Deputy President Paul Mashatile.
