= Maluti-a-Phofung Local Municipality elections =

Local elections in the Free State, South Africa

The Maluti-a-Phofung Local Municipality council consists of sixty-nine members elected by mixed-member proportional representation. Thirty-five councillors are elected by first-past-the-post voting in thirty-five wards, while the remaining thirty-four are chosen from party lists so that the total number of party representatives is proportional to the number of votes received.

In the election of 3 August 2016 the African National Congress (ANC) won a majority of forty-seven seats on the council.

In the 2021 election the ANC lost its majority, although it still won the most seats, and was unseated by a coalition led by the MAP16 Civic Movement.

In the 2026 election no party won a majority again. The ANC remains the party with the largest number of seats.

== Results ==
The following table shows the composition of the council after past elections.

Event	AIC	ACM	ANC	ATM	DA	DP	EFF	FF+	IFP	MAP	PAC	Other	Total
2000 election	—	—	51	—	3	10	—	—	1	—	1	1	67
2006 election	—	—	55	—	2	7	—	—	1	—	1	2	68
2011 election	—	—	52	—	4	10	—	0	0	—	0	3	69
2016 election	1	—	47	—	5	4	9	0	0	—	—	3	69
2021 election	1	2	28	1	5	3	7	1	0	20	—	3	70
2026 election	—	15	21	2	14	1	3	1	0	6	0	7	70

== December 2000 election ==
The following table shows the results of the 2000 election.

Party	Ward			List			Total seats
Party	Votes	%	Seats	Votes	%	Seats	Total seats
African National Congress	49,473	73.89	33	49,984	74.76	18	51
Dikwankwetla Party of South Africa	9,031	13.49	0	10,206	15.26	10	10
Democratic Alliance	2,987	4.46	1	3,381	5.06	2	3
Inkatha Freedom Party	1,259	1.88	0	1,134	1.70	1	1
Independent candidates	2,136	3.19	0				0
Pan Africanist Congress of Azania	722	1.08	0	937	1.40	1	1
United Democratic Movement	939	1.40	0	630	0.94	1	1
African Christian Democratic Party	407	0.61	0	589	0.88	0	0
Total	66,954	100.00	34	66,861	100.00	33	67
Valid votes	66,954	97.28		66,861	97.49		
Invalid/blank votes	1,869	2.72		1,724	2.51		
Total votes	68,823	100.00		68,585	100.00		
Registered voters/turnout	156,482	43.98		156,482	43.83		

== March 2006 election ==
The following table shows the results of the 2006 election.

Party	Ward			List			Total seats
Party	Votes	%	Seats	Votes	%	Seats	Total seats
African National Congress	62,713	80.31	33	62,826	80.41	22	55
Dikwankwetla Party of South Africa	7,885	10.10	0	8,631	11.05	7	7
Democratic Alliance	2,963	3.79	1	2,657	3.40	1	2
African Christian Democratic Party	815	1.04	0	1,035	1.32	1	1
Pan Africanist Congress of Azania	779	1.00	0	989	1.27	1	1
Independent candidates	1,607	2.06	0				0
Inkatha Freedom Party	588	0.75	0	682	0.87	1	1
Azanian People's Organisation	544	0.70	0	703	0.90	1	1
Freedom Front Plus	198	0.25	0	611	0.78	0	0
Total	78,092	100.00	34	78,134	100.00	34	68
Valid votes	78,092	97.47		78,134	97.49		
Invalid/blank votes	2,029	2.53		2,010	2.51		
Total votes	80,121	100.00		80,144	100.00		
Registered voters/turnout	168,286	47.61		168,286	47.62		

== May 2011 election ==
The following table shows the results of the 2011 election.

Party	Ward			List			Total seats
Party	Votes	%	Seats	Votes	%	Seats	Total seats
African National Congress	67,914	74.99	35	68,764	75.47	17	52
Dikwankwetla Party of South Africa	13,106	14.47	0	12,629	13.86	10	10
Democratic Alliance	5,910	6.53	0	5,433	5.96	4	4
Congress of the People	593	0.65	0	1,431	1.57	1	1
African People's Convention	390	0.43	0	835	0.92	1	1
African Christian Democratic Party	536	0.59	0	495	0.54	1	1
Freedom Front Plus	670	0.74	0	193	0.21	0	0
Inkatha Freedom Party	335	0.37	0	441	0.48	0	0
National Freedom Party	271	0.30	0	485	0.53	0	0
Independent candidates	567	0.63	0				0
Pan Africanist Congress of Azania	122	0.13	0	323	0.35	0	0
United Residents Front	155	0.17	0	84	0.09	0	0
Total	90,569	100.00	35	91,113	100.00	34	69
Valid votes	90,569	97.67		91,113	98.12		
Invalid/blank votes	2,165	2.33		1,747	1.88		
Total votes	92,734	100.00		92,860	100.00		
Registered voters/turnout	176,579	52.52		176,579	52.59		

== August 2016 election ==
The following table shows the results of the 2016 election.

Party	Ward			List			Total seats
Party	Votes	%	Seats	Votes	%	Seats	Total seats
African National Congress	65,118	68.15	35	63,428	66.64	12	47
Economic Freedom Fighters	11,774	12.32	0	11,941	12.55	9	9
Democratic Alliance	7,158	7.49	0	7,258	7.63	5	5
Dikwankwetla Party of South Africa	4,851	5.08	0	5,228	5.49	4	4
All Unemployment Labour Alliance	3,416	3.57	0	2,638	2.77	2	2
African Independent Congress	689	0.72	0	2,620	2.75	1	1
African People's Convention	444	0.46	0	637	0.67	1	1
African Christian Democratic Party	487	0.51	0	491	0.52	0	0
Freedom Front Plus	380	0.40	0	278	0.29	0	0
Inkatha Freedom Party	286	0.30	0	294	0.31	0	0
Independent candidates	473	0.50	0				0
African People's Socialist Party	175	0.18	0	193	0.20	0	0
Congress of the People	241	0.25	0				0
United Residents Front	63	0.07	0	168	0.18	0	0
Total	95,555	100.00	35	95,174	100.00	34	69
Valid votes	95,555	97.84		95,174	97.49		
Invalid/blank votes	2,106	2.16		2,454	2.51		
Total votes	97,661	100.00		97,628	100.00		
Registered voters/turnout	185,843	52.55		185,843	52.53		

=== 2019 municipal by-elections ===
In 2019, the African National Congress (ANC) expelled sixteen of its municipal councillors (fifteen ward councillors and one PR councillor) for defying a Provincial Executive Committee (PEC) decision by siding with opposition parties to remove executive mayor Vusi Tshabalala. All fifteen ward councillors contested the by-elections as independent candidates in their respective wards on 28 August 2019, of whom ten were elected. The ANC managed to retain five wards, despite strenuous canvassing by the provincial leadership and former premier Ace Magashule. The table below depicts the new composition of the council.

Party	Ward	PR list	Total
ANC	25	12	37
Independent	10	0	10
EFF	0	9	9
DA	0	5	5
Dikwankwetla Party	0	4	4
All Unemployment Labour Alliance	0	2	2
AIC	0	1	1
APC	0	1	1
Total	35	34	69

== November 2021 election ==
The 2021 election saw the African National Congress (ANC) lose its majority for the first time. Although it still finished with the most seats, a rival grouping led by the MAP16 Civic Movement, founded by a group of ANC councillors who had been expelled for voting to unseat the ANC mayor, who was facing corruption charges, formed a coalition to take control. Maluti-a-Phofung became the first local municipality in the Free State not to be governed by the ANC.

The following table shows the results of the 2021 election.

Party	Ward			List			Total seats
Party	Votes	%	Seats	Votes	%	Seats	Total seats
African National Congress	30,800	38.58	21	31,803	39.82	7	28
MAP16 Civic Movement	22,970	28.77	13	22,627	28.33	7	20
Economic Freedom Fighters	7,678	9.62	0	8,043	10.07	7	7
Democratic Alliance	5,595	7.01	1	5,901	7.39	4	5
Dikwankwetla Party of South Africa	3,131	3.92	0	3,760	4.71	3	3
African Content Movement	1,679	2.10	0	1,544	1.93	2	2
African Transformation Movement	1,375	1.72	0	1,388	1.74	1	1
Independent candidates	2,411	3.02	0				0
African Independent Congress	1,096	1.37	0	978	1.22	1	1
Freedom Front Plus	523	0.66	0	484	0.61	1	1
South African Royal Kingdoms Organization	448	0.56	0	480	0.60	1	1
All Unemployment Labour Alliance	339	0.42	0	534	0.67	1	1
Ikemeleng Free State	390	0.49	0	431	0.54	0	0
African Christian Democratic Party	396	0.50	0	339	0.42	0	0
African People's Convention	335	0.42	0	388	0.49	0	0
Inkatha Freedom Party	67	0.08	0	369	0.46	0	0
Afrikan Alliance of Social Democrats	234	0.29	0	172	0.22	0	0
Agency for New Agenda	109	0.14	0	190	0.24	0	0
Al Jama-ah	98	0.12	0	154	0.19	0	0
Disability and Older Person Political Party	122	0.15	0	107	0.13	0	0
Congress of the People	48	0.06	0	173	0.22	0	0
Total	79,844	100.00	35	79,865	100.00	35	70
Valid votes	79,844	98.04		79,865	98.00		
Invalid/blank votes	1,600	1.96		1,633	2.00		
Total votes	81,444	100.00		81,498	100.00		
Registered voters/turnout	175,983	46.28		175,983	46.31		

== November 2026 election ==
The following table shows the results of the 2026 election.

Party	Ward			List			Total seats
Party	Votes	%	Seats	Votes	%	Seats	Total seats
African National Congress	26,297	29.23	20	26,791	30.02	1	21
African Content Movement	17,659	19.63	7	19,932	22.33	8	15
Democratic Alliance	16,412	18.24	4	17,545	19.66	10	14
MAP16 Civic Movement	7,264	8.07	3	6,425	7.20	3	6
Economic Freedom Fighters	4,178	4.64	0	4,299	4.82	3	3
South African Communist Party	2,016	2.24	1	1,835	2.06	1	2
African Transformation Movement	1,818	2.02	0	1,891	2.12	2	2
uMkhonto weSizwe Party	3,546	3.94	0				0
Dikwankwetla Party of South Africa	1,458	1.62	0	1,338	1.50	1	1
Freedom Front Plus	1,221	1.36	0	1,229	1.38	1	1
African Congress for Transformation	851	0.95	0	980	1.10	1	1
Community First Alliance	757	0.84	0	1,068	1.20	1	1
Baahi Civic Movement	780	0.87	0	771	0.86	1	1
Independent candidates	1,386	1.54	0				0
African People's Movement	742	0.82	0	598	0.67	1	1
Patriotic Alliance	552	0.61	0	547	0.61	1	1
Local Economic Movement	586	0.65	0	449	0.50	0	0
African Movement Congress	307	0.34	0	642	0.72	0	0
African Heart Congress	452	0.50	0	390	0.44	0	0
Afrika Mayibuye Movement	332	0.37	0	415	0.47	0	0
United Africans Transformation	180	0.20	0	407	0.46	0	0
Inkatha Freedom Party	217	0.24	0	290	0.32	0	0
South African Royal Kingdoms Organization	180	0.20	0	189	0.21	0	0
African Christian Democratic Party				336	0.38	0	0
Economic Emancipation Forum	189	0.21	0	139	0.16	0	0
Congress of the People	148	0.16	0	122	0.14	0	0
Afrikan Alliance of Social Democrats	122	0.14	0	127	0.14	0	0
Pan Africanist Congress of Azania	87	0.10	0	130	0.15	0	0
Al Jama-ah	102	0.11	0	108	0.12	0	0
National Freedom Party	75	0.08	0	99	0.11	0	0
Organic Humanity Movement	59	0.07	0	51	0.06	0	0
All Unemployment Labour Alliance				101	0.11	0	0
Total	89,973	100.00	35	89,244	100.00	35	70
Valid votes	89,973	97.64		89,244	97.31		
Invalid/blank votes	2,173	2.36		2,465	2.69		
Total votes	92,146	100.00		91,709	100.00		
Registered voters/turnout	189,966	48.51		189,966	48.28		
