= Makalo Mohale =

South African politician

Makalo Mohale MPL

Member of the Free State Executive Council for Education
- In office 14 March 2023 – 14 June 2024
- Premier: Mxolisi Dukwana
- Preceded by: Tate Makgoe
- Succeeded by: Mantlhake Maboya

Member of the Free State Executive Council for Economic, Small Business Development, Tourism and Environmental Affairs
- In office 28 May 2019 – 14 March 2023
- Premier: Sisi Ntombela
- Preceded by: Limakatso Mahasa
- Succeeded by: Thabo Meeko

Member of the Free State Provincial Legislature
- In office 22 May 2019 – 28 May 2024

Personal details
- Born: Makalo Petrus Mohale
- Party: African National Congress
- Education: University of South Africa; University of Johannesburg; University of the Free State

Makalo Petrus Mohale is a South African lawyer and African National Congress politician who served as the Member of the Executive Council (MEC) for Education in the Free State from 2023 until 2024. He has previously been the MEC for Economic, Small Business Development, Tourism and Environmental Affairs (DESTEA) from May 2019 until March 2023. Mohale is the provincial chairperson of the African National Congress Youth League.

== Early life and education ==
Mohale grew up in Botshabelo, a township east of Bloemfontein in the Orange Free State Province. He holds an LLB degree from the University of South Africa and a BCom degree from the University of the Free State. He holds a post-graduate diploma in law, a post-graduate diploma in contracting and a diploma in corporate law from the University of Johannesburg.

== Career ==
=== Political career ===
Mohale became active in politics while at the University of the Free State. He served as the branch chairperson of the South African Student Congress at the university between 2002 and 2003. He was SASCO's provincial secretary from 2003 to 2004. Mohale also served as the branch chairperson of the National Education, Health and Allied Workers' Union from 2006 to 2007.

While holding these positions, he also held senior positions in the African National Congress and its youth league. From 2002 until 2004, Mohale served as the deputy secretary of the party's Thutong branch in Mangaung and as the chairperson of the youth league at the University of the Free State. He was chair of the youth league in Parys between 2008 and 2011. In 2013, Mohale became the convenor of the provincial youth league structure and was elected as chairperson the following year.

In 2017, he endorsed Nkosazana Dlamini-Zuma's campaign for national ANC president.

=== Professional career ===
In 2004, he did his law articles in Bloemfontein, the provincial capital. Mohale was a public participation officer at the Free State Provincial Legislature between 2004 and 2007. He proceeded to work as a supply chain manager at the Ngwathe Local Municipality until 2012. He was then appointed as the Mangaung mayoral spokesperson. He held this position until 2013. Mohale was then employed by the Free State Department of Police Roads and Transport in April 2013. He served in this position until his appointment as the premier's spokesperson in 2015. Soon after, Mohale was appointed to the provincial housing department as the chief director of housing programmes. He held this position until the provincial and national elections that was held on 8 May 2019.

=== Member of the Executive Council ===
He joined the provincial legislature as a member following the elections. On 28 May 2019, Mohale was appointed MEC for Economic, Small Business Development, Tourism and Environmental Affairs, replacing Limakatso Mahasa. He was tasked by premier Sisi Ntombela with resolving the issue of youth unemployment.

In February 2020, Mohale and a delegation from the department completed a nine-day investment drive in Turkey.

Mohale became the MEC for Education in March 2023, following Mxolisi Dukwana's election as Premier of the Free State the previous month.

Makalo was ranked too low on the ANC's list to be re-elected to the Provincial Legislature in the 2024 general election. Mantlhake Maboya succeeded him as the MEC for Education.
