= Vusi Tshabalala =

South African politician

Vusi Tshabalala MPL

Member of the Free State Provincial Legislature
- Incumbent
- Assumed office 22 May 2019

Mayor of Maluti-a-Phofung
- In office September 2013 – May 2018
- Preceded by: Sarah Moleleki
- Succeeded by: Gilbert Moktso

Personal details
- Citizenship: South Africa
- Party: African National Congress

Vusimusi William Tshabalala is a South African politician who has represented the African National Congress (ANC) in the Free State Provincial Legislature since 2019. He was also the Majority Chief Whip in the legislature until October 2021, when he was replaced after the ANC suspended him while he faced internal disciplinary charges. He is also known for his controversial tenure in the Free State's Maluti-a-Phofung Local Municipality, where he was Mayor between 2013 and 2018.

== Mayor of Maluti-a-Phofung: 2013–2018 ==
Tshabalala became acting Mayor of Maluti-a-Phofung in September 2013 after the incumbent, Sarah Moleleki, resigned; he was formally elected and inaugurated in early February 2014. At the time the ANC said that he was the youngest mayor in the Free State. He became known as a staunch political ally of Ace Magashule, then the Provincial Chairperson of the ANC's Free State branch.

His tenure as mayor was controversial. In February 2018, the municipality was placed under administration; local opposition parties and press linked the municipality's financial difficulties to alleged corruption and dubbed Tshabalala the municipality's "gangster mayor". In March of that year, an investigative report by the Mail & Guardian triggered a "jobs for votes" scandal, with the newspaper claiming that municipal funds had been used to buy votes ahead of the ANC's 54th National Conference. Also in 2018, Tshabalala faced service delivery protests in the municipality and several motions of no confidence tabled against him by opposition councillors. The opposition Democratic Alliance later alleged that he held the council "hostage" during this period; according to opposition councillors, the no-confidence votes were disrupted by Tshabalala's supporters.

In early May 2018, the provincial leadership of the ANC – no longer led by Magashule – "recalled" Tshabalala as mayor, asking him to resign or face a no-confidence motion from within his own party. He resigned and was replaced the following month by Gilbert Moktso.

== Member of the Provincial Legislature: 2019–present ==
Tshabalala was elected to the free state Provincial Legislature in the 2019 general election, ranked sixth on the ANC's provincial party list. The ANC named him as Majority Chief Whip in the legislature and additionally as Chairperson of its Committee on Public Accounts and Finance. The opposition Democratic Alliance opposed his appointment to the latter position, arguing that he had presided over corruption and financial maladministration in the Maluti-a-Phofung municipality.

In October 2021, the ANC suspended Tshabalala from his party and legislative offices, pending internal disciplinary proceedings. He was accused of – but denied – supporting independent candidates during the 2021 local government elections. After his disciplinary hearing was held on 10–11 May 2022, the ANC's provincial disciplinary committee ruled that the charges relied on inadmissible hearsay evidence. He was acquitted and reinstated to his party membership and legislative activity, but he was not reinstated as Chief Whip; Thabo Meeko, who had been appointed after his suspension, remained in that office.

Following his reinstatement, Tshabalala launched a campaign to be elected Provincial Chairperson of the Free State ANC. However, when the provincial party's local branches nominated their preferred candidates, Tshabalala did not perform well: he was nominated by only six branches, compared with the 59 nominations for Mxolisi Dukwana, 37 nominations for Sisi Ntombela, and 15 nominations for Thabo Manyoni. Tshabalala ultimately stood for the position of Provincial Treasurer instead, but when the conference was held in January 2023 he lost in a vote to Mathabo Leeto, who received 346 votes to Tshabalala's 304.

== See also ==
- MAP16 Civic Movement
