= Limakatso Mahasa =

South African politician

Free State MEC for Sport, Arts, Culture and Recreation
- In office 28 May 2019 – 14 June 2024
- Premier: Mxolisi Dukwana; Sisi Ntombela
- Preceded by: Mathabo Leeto
- Succeeded by: Zanele Sifuba

Free State MEC for Economic, Small Business Development, Tourism & Environmental Affairs
- In office 9 May 2018 – 28 May 2019
- Premier: Sisi Ntombela
- Preceded by: Benny Malakoane
- Succeeded by: Makalo Mohale

Free State MEC for Social Development
- In office 4 October 2016 – 9 May 2018
- Premier: Ace Magashule
- Preceded by: Sisi Ntombela
- Succeeded by: Butana Khompela

Member of the Free State Provincial Legislature
- In office 21 May 2014 – 28 May 2024

Personal details
- Born: Limakatso Patricia Mahasa; 12 December 1978 (age 47) Maokeng, Kroonstad, South Africa
- Party: African National Congress
- Education: University of the Witwatersrand; University of Johannesburg

Limakatso Patricia Mahasa (born 12 December 1978) is a South African politician who served as the Member of the Executive Council (MEC) for Sport, Arts, Culture and Recreation in the Free State from 2019 until 2024. A member of the African National Congress, she previously served as the MEC for Economic, Small Business Development, Tourism & Environmental Affairs from 2018 until 2019 and before that, as the MEC for Social Development from 2016 to 2018.

== Early life and education ==
Mahasa was born in Maokeng, Kroonstad in the Orange Free State Province on 12 December 1978. She matriculated from Calculus High School. Mahasa went on to earn a qualification in Advanced Governance and Public Leadership from the University of the Witwatersrand in 2016 and a competence certificate on strategic diplomacy from the University of Johannesburg in 2017. She is currently registered for the Management Advanced Programme at Wits.

== Political career ==
Mahasa joined the African National Congress Youth League at a young age. She was an ANCYL branch executive committee member, a member of the ANCYL regional executive committee in the Fezile Dabi region and a member of the Provincial Task Team (PTT) and the youth league's Provincial Executive Committee in the Free State. Mahasa was a secretary of an ANC Branch Executive Committee, a member of the Fezile Dabi regional executive and a Provincial Task Team (PTT) member.

Mahasa was employed as a secretary in the office of the chief whip in the Moqhaka Local Municipality between 2006 and 2007, when she became the personal assistant to the chief whip. In 2011, she was elected as an ANC PR councillor in the Moqhaka municipality and was appointed a manager in the speaker's office.

=== Provincial government ===
In 2014, Mahasa was elected to the Free State Provincial Legislature. She was appointed a finance whip. She was elected chairperson of the Portfolio Committee of Co-operative Governance and Traditional Affairs, Police and Premier in 2015. On 4 October 2016, Mahasa was appointed Member of the Executive Council (MEC) for Social Development by premier Ace Magashule.

On 9 May 2018, Mahasa was selected to be the MEC for Economic, Small Business Development, Tourism and Environmental Affairs by newly premier Sisi Ntombela.

Following the 2019 national and provincial elections, Mahasa became the MEC for Sport, Arts, Culture and Recreation in the newly configured Executive Council of Sisi Ntombela.

On 14 March 2023, Mahasa was reappointed to her role Executive Council by premier Mxolisi Dukwana, who succeeded Ntombela following her resignation in February 2023. She left the provincial legislature at the 2024 general election.

Political offices
Preceded by Mathabo Leeto	Free State MEC for Sport, Arts, Culture and Recreation; 2019–2024	Succeeded by Zanele Sifuba
Preceded by Benny Malakoane	Free State MEC for Economic, Small Business Development, Tourism & Environmental Affairs; 2018–2019	Succeeded by Makalo Mohale
Preceded by Sisi Ntombela	Free State MEC for Social Development; 2016–2018	Succeeded by Butana Khompela
