= Kgotso Morapela =

South African politician

Member of the Free State Provincial Legislature
- In office November 2015 – 7 May 2019

Member of the National Assembly of South Africa
- In office 21 May 2014 – 31 October 2015
- Succeeded by: Thembinkosi Rawula

Personal details
- Born: Kgotso Zachariah Morapela
- Party: Economic Freedom Fighters (2014–present)
- Other political affiliations: African National Congress (Until 2014)
- Occupation: Politician

Kgotso Zachariah Morapela is a South African politician for the Economic Freedom Fighters. He was the party's provincial chairman in the Free State until 2018 and represented the party in the National Assembly and the Free State Provincial Legislature.

== Political career ==
Morapela served as the provincial chairperson of the African National Congress Youth League in the Free State. In February 2014, he resigned from the African National Congress to join expelled former youth league president Julius Malema's new political party, the Economic Freedom Fighters (EFF). He then stood as a candidate for the party in the national and provincial elections in May of that same year, and was elected to a seat in the National Assembly. Having entered parliament, Morapela was named to the Portfolio Committee on Public Enterprises in June 2014. Also in June, an EFF Provincial Command Team (PCT) member claimed that the party's convenor was removed to make way for Morapela to assume the position due to his past involvement with the ANC Youth League. He was later elected as provincial chairperson of the party.

Morapela resigned from the National Assembly on 31 October 2015, having been deployed by the party to the Free State Provincial Legislature. Thembinkosi Rawula took up his seat in the National Assembly. Morapela was sworn in as a member of the Provincial Legislature in November 2015 and was assigned to the following committees: Economic Development, Governance, Budget and Oversight, and Public Accounts and Finance. Morapela and Mandisa Makesini disrupted premier Ace Magashule's 2016 State of the Province Address.

At the EFF's provincial conference held in September 2018, fellow MPL Mandisa Makesini was elected provincial chairperson, defeating Morapela by only three votes. Morapela continued to serve as a Member of the Free State Provincial Legislature until the 2019 general elections. He was not included on the party's provincial candidate list and was placed in an unelectable position on the party's National Assembly candidate list.

== Personal life ==
In the 2015 Register of Members' Interest, Morapela disclosed that he owned a house in Bloemfontein and an empty stand in Smithfield.
