= 2019 Free State provincial election =

Provincial election

- 8 May 2019

All 30 seats to the Free State Provincial Legislature 16 seats needed for a majority

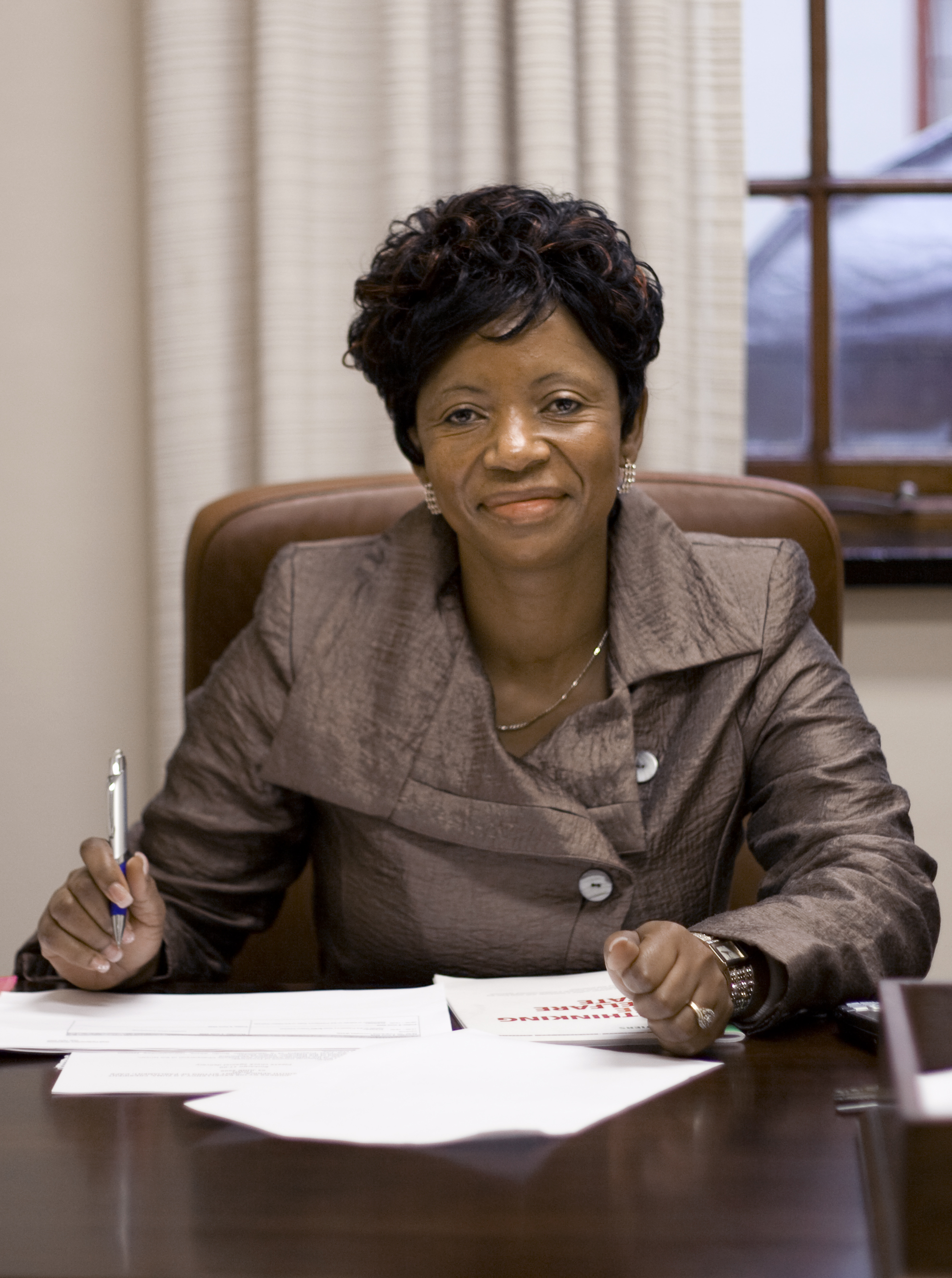

	First party	Second party
Candidate	Sisi Ntombela	Patricia Kopane
Party	ANC	DA
Last election	69.85%	16.23%
Seats before	22	5
Seats won	19	6
Seat change	▼3	▲1
Popular vote	541,535	155,694
Percentage	61.14%	17.58%
Swing	▼8.71%	▲1.35%
	Third party	Fourth party
Candidate	Mandisa Makesini	Jan van Niekerk
Party	EFF	VF+
Last election	8.15%	2.10%
Seats before	2	1
Seats won	4	1
Seat change	▲2	0
Popular vote	111,427	35,031
Percentage	12.58%	3.96%
Swing	▲4.43%	▲1.86%
Premier before election
Sisi Ntombela
African National Congress
Elected Premier
Sisi Ntombela
African National Congress

The 2019 Free State provincial election was held on 8 May 2019, concurrently with the 2019 South African general election, to elect the 30 members of the Free State Provincial Legislature.

The election was won by the African National Congress, the incumbent governing party in the province.

== Premier candidates ==
The African National Congress (ANC) did not announce a premier candidate before the election. Provincial chairperson Sam Mashinini was first on the ANC's list with incumbent premier Sisi Ntombela third on the list. After the election, Ntombela was announced as the party's premier candidate and she was elected for another term at the first sitting of the legislature after the election.

The Democratic Alliance (DA) chose Patricia Kopane, a two-term Member of Parliament and its leader in the Free State. She defeated Coreen Malherbe for the position.

The Economic Freedom Fighters (EFF) did not field a premier candidate, since the party seeks to abolish provincial governments. Mandisa Makesini appeared first on the party's list.

The Freedom Front Plus (FF Plus) selected their incumbent provincial leader and former member of the provincial legislature, Jan van Niekerk.

== Results ==
Party	Votes	%	+/–	Seats	+/–
African National Congress	541,535	61.14	–8.71	19	–3
Democratic Alliance	155,694	17.58	+1.35	6	+1
Economic Freedom Fighters	111,427	12.58	+4.43	4	+2
Freedom Front Plus	35,031	3.96	+1.86	1	0
African Transformation Movement	6,897	0.78	New	0	New
Patriotic Alliance	4,950	0.56	+0.50	0	0
Congress of the People	3,972	0.45	–1.18	0	0
African Independent Congress	3,960	0.45	New	0	New
African Christian Democratic Party	3,697	0.42	–0.09	0	0
African Democratic Change	3,346	0.38	New	0	New
African Content Movement	1,885	0.21	New	0	New
Afrikan Alliance of Social Democrats	1,646	0.19	New	0	New
Socialist Revolutionary Workers Party	1,567	0.18	New	0	New
Pan Africanist Congress	1,513	0.17	–0.04	0	0
Agang South Africa	1,338	0.15	–0.05	0	0
African People's Convention	1,309	0.15	–0.17	0	0
Azanian People's Organisation	833	0.09	–0.07	0	0
United Democratic Movement	826	0.09	–0.12	0	0
Good	709	0.08	New	0	New
Inkatha Freedom Party	705	0.08	–0.03	0	0
Power of Africans Unity	533	0.06	New	0	New
African Congress of Democrats	505	0.06	New	0	New
Women Forward	408	0.05	New	0	New
African Covenant	365	0.04	New	0	New
Alliance for Transformation for All	361	0.04	New	0	New
National Freedom Party	288	0.03	–0.08	0	0
South African Concerned Residents Organisation 4 Service Delivery	253	0.03	New	0	New
South African National Congress of Traditional Authorities	124	0.01	New	0	New
Total	885,677	100.00	–	30	0
Valid votes	885,677	98.72			
Invalid/blank votes	11,508	1.28			
Total votes	897,185	100.00			
Registered voters/turnout	1,462,508	61.35			
Source: Election Resources

== Aftermath ==
During the first sitting of the provincial legislature on 22 May 2019, Sisi Ntombela was re-elected as premier, while Zanele Sifuba was elected speaker, and Vusi Tshabalala was appointed chief whip.
