= Elzabe Rockman =

South African politician

Elzabe Rockman MPL
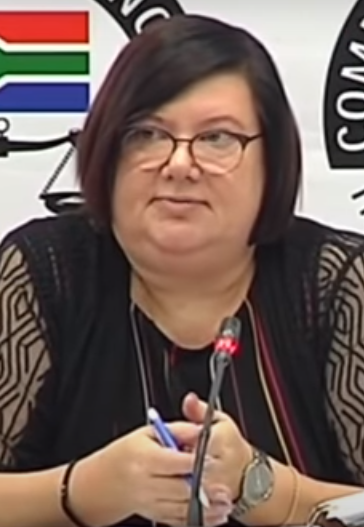
- Rockman in 2019

Free State MEC for Agriculture, Rural Development and Environmental Affairs
- Incumbent
- Assumed office 23 June 2024
- Premier: Maqueen Letsoha-Mathae
- Preceded by: Saki Mokoena

Free State MEC for Finance
- In office 12 March 2013 – 7 May 2019
- Premier: Sisi Ntombela; Ace Magashule
- Preceded by: Seiso Mohai
- Succeeded by: Gadija Brown

Personal details
- Born: 20 April 1967 (age 59) Kimberley, Cape Province, South Africa
- Party: African National Congress
- Children: 1
- Education: University of the Free State
- Profession: Politician
- Known for: Serving as the MEC for Finance during the premiership of Ace Magashule.

Elizabeth Cornelia "Elzabe" Rockman (born 20 April 1967) is a South African African National Congress politician who has been the Member of the Executive Council for Agriculture, Rural Development and Environmental Affairs since 2024. She was the Member of the Free State Executive Council for Finance during the premierships of Ace Magashule and Sisi Ntombela. She was first appointed to the post in March 2013 and left office in May 2019. She was also a Member of the Free State Provincial Legislature during that time. From 2010 to 2013, she was the Director-General of the Free State Provincial Government. In October 2019, she testified at the Zondo Commission.

== Early life ==
Rockman was born on 20 April 1967 in Kimberley in the former Cape Province. She studied at the University of the Free State and obtained a BEd degree in Languages and a BA Honours in English.

== Career ==
Rockman became the secretary of the Free State Provincial Legislature in 1994 and served in the post until 2009. She joined the provincial government after the 2009 general election. She was soon appointed Director-General of the Free State Provincial Government in September 2010. On 12 March 2013, premier Ace Magashule appointed her as the Member of the Executive Council for Finance, succeeding Seiso Mohai, who was redeployed to Parliament. After the 2014 general election, she remained in the post. In 2017, she became a certified fraud examiner. Magashule resigned as premier in 2018 and newly elected premier Sisi Ntombela retained Rockman in her position.

Rockman left the provincial government after the 2019 general election. Gadija Brown succeeded her as Finance MEC.

Rockman returned to the Provincial Legislature following the 2024 general election. The newly elected premier Maqueen Letsoha-Mathae appointed her as the MEC for Agriculture, Rural Development and Environmental Affairs.

== 2019 State capture testimony ==
In October 2019, Rockman testified at The Judicial Commission of Inquiry into Allegations of State Capture, known as the Zondo Commission, about the provincial treasury's role in the corruption-tainted Vrede Dairy Project, a project meant to empower black farmers. The project was managed by the Gupta-owned Estina company, which led to more than R220 million in public funds, which were meant for the dairy, being siphoned towards the Gupta family and only 1% spent on actual farming, as reported by the City Press.

Rockman said that she had visited the Gupta family on multiple occasions. She also said that she was aware of the first R30 million in public funds being transferred towards the project. Newspaper reports later suggested that the R30 million was used to pay for the 2013 wedding of Vega Gupta at the Sun City resort in the North West Province. In the end, from 2013 to 2016, the provincial government paid R334 million towards the Guptas with little being spent on farming.

Rockman mentioned in her testimony that she had met with Guptas in February 2014 about reports of cows dying. She also mentioned that her department was reportedly "stuck" with what the provincial Agriculture Department presented. She, later on, in her testimony said that the project should have been put through a tender process and that she was concerned that there was "no public process". It was unknown to the provincial treasury department on why Estina had been chosen for the project and Rockman claimed that it would have been "unlikely" for Estina to get the tender if it had gone through a public process.

Also in her testimony, Rockman mentioned that the provincial government had gone into an agreement with the now-defunct Gupta-owned The New Age to buy around 4,000 copies of the paper daily. She said: "The subscription was to give support to The New Age as a new entrant to the market."

== Personal life ==
Rockman's daughter, Caitlyn, is a model.

| Preceded by Seiso Mohai | Free State MEC for Finance; 2013–2019 | Succeeded by Gadija Brown |
