= Thembeni Nxangisa =

South African politician (died 2026)

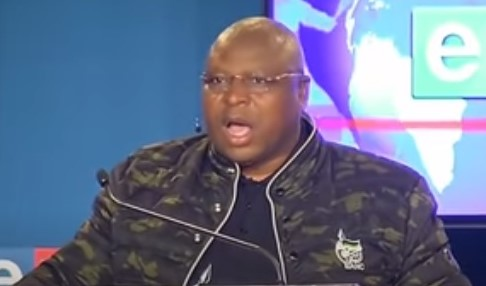
- Nxangisa in 2019

Free State MEC for Agriculture and Rural Development
- In office 1 October 2021 – 14 March 2023
- Premier: Sisi Ntombela
- Preceded by: William Bulwane
- Succeeded by: Saki Mokoena

Free State MEC for CoGTA
- In office 28 May 2019 – 1 October 2021
- Premier: Sisi Ntombela
- Preceded by: Oupa Khoabane
- Succeeded by: Mxolisi Dukwana

Member of the Free State Provincial Legislature
- In office 22 May 2019 – July 2026

Personal details
- Born: Skully Thembeni Nxangisa
- Died: July 2026
- Party: African National Congress
- Profession: Politician

Skully Thembeni Nxangisa (died July 2026) was a South African politician who served in the Free State Executive Council as the Member of the Executive Council (MEC) for Cooperative Governance and Traditional Affairs from May 2019 until October 2021, when he became the MEC for Agriculture and Rural Development. He was removed from the executive council in March 2023

== Political career ==
Nxangisa was a member of the African National Congress. For the provincial election on 8 May 2019, he was placed 8th on the ANC's provincial list. The ANC managed to win 19 seats in the provincial legislature and Nxangisa was sworn in as an MPL when the legislature reconvened on 22 May 2019.

On 28 May 2019, Premier Sisi Ntombela announced her new executive council for the sixth administration. She appointed Nxangisa MEC for Cooperative Governance and Traditional Affairs. He was sworn in later that same day.

On 1 October 2021, Nxangisa was appointed MEC for Agriculture and Rural Development by Ntombela. On 14 March 2023, Nxangisa was removed as MEC for Agriculture and Rural Development and excluded from the executive council entirely by newly elected premier Mxolisi Dukwana; Saki Mokoena was appointed to succeed Nxangisa.

== Personal life and death ==
Nxangisa tested positive for COVID-19 on 25 July 2020.

Nxangisa died in July 2026.
