= Maureen Scheepers =

South African politician

Member of the National Assembly of South Africa
- In office 21 May 2014 – 30 June 2016
- Succeeded by: Thabo Manyoni
- Constituency: Free State

Member of the Free State Provincial Legislature
- In office 6 May 2009 – 6 May 2014

Personal details
- Party: African National Congress

Maureen Angela Scheepers is a South African politician who served as a Member of the National Assembly of South Africa for the African National Congress from 2014 to 2016. Prior to serving in Parliament, she was a member of the Free State Provincial Legislature from 2009 until 2014.

== Political career ==
Scheepers was elected to the Free State Provincial Legislature in the 2009 general election as a member of the African National Congress. Having entered the provincial legislature, she was elected to chair the Police, Road & Transport Committee for the 4th Legislature (2009–2014).

Scheepers stood as an ANC parliamentary candidate from the Free State in the 2014 general election and was elected to the National Assembly of South Africa and sworn in on 21 May 2014. Shortly afterwards, she was named to the Portfolio Committee on Health and the Portfolio Committee on Science and Technology.

Scheepers resigned from parliament on 30 June 2016. Former Mangaung mayor Thabo Manyoni was selected to fill her seat.
