= Michiel De Bruyn =

South African politician

Permanent Delegate to the National Council of Provinces from the Free State
- In office May 2021 – 28 May 2024

Personal details
- Party: Freedom Front Plus

Michiel Adriaan Petrus De Bruyn is a South African politician. A member of the Freedom Front Plus, he represented the Free State in the National Council of Provinces from 2021 until 2024. He took up Armand Cloete's seat, who was sworn in as a member of the Free State Provincial Legislature. Prior to his appointment to the NCOP, De Bruyn was a Freedom Front Plus councillor in the Mangaung Metropolitan Municipality.

Following the 2024 general election, Tammy Breedt was chosen by the FF Plus to represent the Free State in the NCOP.
