= Saki Mokoena =

South African politician (born 1974)

Saki Mokoena MPL

Member of the Free State Executive Council for Cooperative Governance and Traditional Affairs and Human Settlements
- Incumbent
- Assumed office 23 June 2024
- Premier: Maqueen Letsoha-Mathae
- Preceded by: Ketso Makume

Member of the Free State Executive Council for Agriculture and Rural Development
- In office 17 March 2023 – 14 June 2024
- Premier: Mxolisi Dukwana
- Preceded by: Thembeni Nxangisa
- Succeeded by: Elzabe Rockman

Member of the Free State Provincial Legislature
- Incumbent
- Assumed office 16 March 2023

Personal details
- Born: 8 January 1974 (age 52)
- Party: African National Congress

Teboho Zacharia "Saki" Mokoena (born 8 January 1974) is a South African politician who has been the Free State's Member of the Executive Council for Cooperative Governance and Traditional Affairs and Human Settlements since 2024 and a member of the Free State Provincial Legislature since March 2023. He served as the MEC for Agriculture and Rural Development from 2023 until 2024. Mokoena is a member of the African National Congress

== Life and career ==
In June 2021, Mokoena was appointed the provincial head of elections of the African National Congress in the Free State. In 2023, it was reported that he held a higher certificate in economics and was a final-year Bachelor of Commerce in Economics student.

In March 2023, Mokoena was sworn in as a member of the Free State Provincial Legislature and appointed Member of the Executive Council (MEC) for Agriculture and Rural Development.

Mokoenna was promoted to MEC for Cooperative Governance and Traditional Affairs and Human Settlements following the 2024 general election.
