= Hlaudi Motsoeneng =

South African chief executive (born 1968)

- Born: 1968 (age 57–58); Phuthaditjhaba Free State, South Africa or Thaba Bosiu, Lesotho
- Occupations: Former Acting COO of the SABC; Group Executive of Corporate Affairs
- Years active: 1992 - 2017
- Known for: SABC

Hlaudi Motsoeneng is the leader of African Content Movement (ACM) who served as the acting Chief operating officer of the South African Broadcasting Corporation (SABC) from 2011 to 2013. Motsoeneng was removed from his position as Chief operating officer after his dishonesty was revealed, and he was found to have lied about his qualifications. After being removed as acting Chief operating officer it was announced that Motsoeneng would move back to his previous position as Group Executive Editor of Provinces and Corporate Affairs of the SABC. In December 2016, the Western Cape High Court ruled that Motsoeneng's appointment as Group Executive was illegal and that he was "not entitled to occupy any position at the SABC". In June 2022 the state capture commission proposed criminal investigations into possible contraventions of the Public Finance Management Act when group CEO Lulama Mokhobo and COO Motsoeneng concluded an SABC agreement with the Gupta owned TNA newspaper. In July 2022 the High Court dismissed Motsoeneng's bid to appeal the repayment, with interest, of R11.5 million obtained unlawfully when the SABC concluded a deal with MultiChoice.

== Early life ==
Motsoeneng was born in either Phuthaditjhaba, Free State in South Africa or Thaba Bosiu in Lesotho, where he was raised by his aunt. His mother is a sangoma. He attended Qhibi Ha Sethunya primary school in Qwa Qwa, Free State. Motsoeneng went on to Metsi Matsho High School, but did not matriculate.

== Early career ==
Motsoeneng's career began in Puthaditjhaba when he met Kenneth Mopeli, then Chief Minister of the South African bantustan of QwaQwa, who became his mentor. Mopeli worked in the same office as Motsoeneng used to work. In the 1990s Motsoeneng became a freelancer at Radio Sesotho and would carry around a radio bag with a mic recorder where he would get lifts with his friends to stories because he did not own a vehicle.

During this period community members alleged that Motsoeneng was a puppet used by Mopeli because not a week would go by where Motsoeneng would not broadcast a positive story about him. During this time Motsoeneng started to network with other high-profile politicians.

Motsoeneng was eventually moved to Lesedi FM in Bloemfontein in 1992 where he started to make contacts with African National Congress (ANC) politicians. Employed as a stringer he was paid by the story despite being unable to speak English properly and did not have a matric certificate. He wanted to be closer to the newsroom and learn more. At the station, he became good friends with Sebolelo Ditlhakanyane and Sophie Mokoena. He would become close to ANC politicians such as Ace Magashule and Ivy Matsepe-Casaburri who would later go on to become the Premier of Free State and later the Minister of Communication under President Thabo Mbeki. Motsoeneng first met Jacob Zuma when Zuma made a speech in Free State before the 1994 elections. Motsoeneng went to cover the event. Zuma's speech was not well received, but Motsoeneng supported him and the two became close from then on.

In 1995 he applied for permanent employment with the SABC and while completing the application form for the job, lied about having completed his matric at Metsi-Matsho High School in 1991. He would later explain that a Mrs Swanepoel from human resources told him to "fill in anything", while Ivy Matsepe-Casaburri was also chairman of the SABC at the time of his application.

== South African Broadcasting Corporation ==
Motsoeneng joined the public broadcaster in 1996, as a junior news reporter and by 2003 had advanced to become a current affairs executive producer for Lesedi FM reporting to regional editor James Barkhuizen, again claiming to have matric qualifications. Due to his ANC connections, he was able to attract top politicians for interviews on his radio show. In 2002, Motsoeneng was named in a forensic audit in an investigation into the conduct of a news editor in Bloemfontein. Journalists claimed that Motsoeneng was promoted to a senior position as a producer because he helped her gain her own promotion. Soon Motsoeneng was clashing with his boss, Barkhuizen, interfering with the latter's decisions and challenging editorial decisions. He was said to have given staff increases and hired others without his boss's permission. Both would be suspended in 2006 and Motsoeneng faced internal charges of racism, dishonesty, disruption and policy violations. There were at least three inquiries into the problems at the Free State office. The culminated in the 2006 inquiry by the SABC group internal audit department. He was fired from his position in 2007 for allegedly lying about his educational qualifications. In 2008 he sought employment at the Free State provincial government as a communications officer but by 2009, was reinstated at the SABC

=== Return to the SABC ===
After being back for 9 months he was appointed as Acting COO. Motsoeneng is best known for his controversial tenure as COO of the SABC and close relationship with President Jacob Zuma. During his time at SABC Motsoeneng blocked any critical coverage of President Jacob Zuma leading the Public Protector to state that his actions threatened to entrench a culture of impunity of people in power. He was also widely known for the unusual nature of his press statements and demands on journalists working for the SABC. Often referring to himself in the third person and making non sequitur statements.

In February 2014, the public protector, Thuli Madonsela released a report entitled, “When governance and ethics fail” calling for the board of the SABC to take disciplinary action against Motsoeneng for dishonesty and the misrepresentation of his qualification, abuse of power and improper conduct in the appointments and salary increments for several employees. In 2014, the Democratic Alliance brought an interim application before the Western Cape High Court calling for Motsoeneng's suspension pending a disciplinary hearing. Motsoeneng appealed the decision, but was overruled by the Supreme Court of Appeals. In 2015, Motsoeneng was criticized for granting himself a salary increase from R2.8 million to R3.7million, despite a reported annual loss for the SABC of R395 million.

On 19 September 2016, the SABC board asked the Minister of Communications Faith Muthambi to appoint Motsoeneng as acting chief operating officer of the SABC until December 2016.

After the Democratic Alliance filed papers in court in October 2016 against his appointment as the Group Executive of Corporate Affair, on 12 December 2016, the Western Cape High Court's Judge Owen Rogers ruled in favour of the Democratic Alliance application. He declared Motsoeneng's appointment as being unlawful and irrational. The SABC disciplinary hearing, that had cleared his way to obtaining the position, was also declared inadequate. The judge declared that the original disciplinary process should be put aside and a new open hearing established.

In November 2016, parliamentary ad hoc committee was formed to investigate the SABC. The committee was to have a draft report ready by 24 January 2017 with a presentation to parliament on 15 February 2017. A leaked copy of the report in January 2017 outlined problems in financial compliance, political interference, unlawful dismissals of board and staff, interference in editorial decisions and poor transparency in the sale of its archives to MultiChoice and purchase of copies of the New Age newspaper.

After a media briefing on 19 April 2017, presented while on suspension, Motsoeneng proceeded to criticise the SABC, its current board members and parliamentary ad hoc committee that investigated the organisation. The SABC felt he had breached the terms of his suspension and brought the organisation into disrepute and instituted a disciplinary hearing.

In May 2017, he applied to the Labour Court to prevent the SABC from proceeding with its internal disciplinary hearing but the court denied his application. On 12 June 2017, the SABC finally sacked Motsoeneng after an internal disciplinary hearing found him to having lied about his qualifications, firing and retrenching staff and policy violations in regard to salary increases. In August 2017, he failed to appear in the Labour Court to answer questions as to why he shouldn't be held personally responsible for wrongly dismissing eight SABC journalists in July 2016. They had spoken out about the latter's decision for the SABC not to broadcast anti-government protests.

== Political career ==
On 13 December 2018, at the Garden Court Milpark Hotel in Johannesburg, Motsoeneng launched a political party, the African Content Movement. He claimed he would become president, that the country would produce 90% of its requirements, that the economy shall be in the hands of the people, that company workers would become shareholders, that foreign companies would be forced to leave the country, and that social grants would be reduced. The African Content Movement received 4,841 votes or 0.03% of the total vote in the 2019 election.

Motsoeneng stated that he "was not really serious and at the time [...] did not even understand the art of politics" but that he intends to contest the 2024 general election both nationally and in the Free state province.
