= Dan Kgothule =

South African politician

Member of the Free State Executive Council for Sports, Arts, Culture and Recreation
- In office May 2009 – May 2014
- Premier: Ace Magashule
- Preceded by: Mamiki Qabathe (for Sports, Arts and Culture)
- Succeeded by: Mathabo Leeto

Member of the Free State Provincial Legislature
- In office May 2009 – May 2014

Personal details
- Citizenship: South Africa
- Party: African National Congress

Dan Andrew Mokhuwe Kgothule is a South African politician who represented the African National Congress (ANC) in the Free State Provincial Legislature from 2009 to 2014. Throughout that period, he served as the Free State's Member of the Executive Council (MEC) for Sports, Arts, Culture and Recreation under Premier Ace Magashule.

== Early life ==
Kgothule has said that he joined the ANC in the mid-1980s at the height of apartheid.

== Career in government ==
He was elected to the Free State Provincial Legislature in the 2009 general election, ranked ninth on the ANC's provincial party list. After the election, on 11 May 2009, newly elected Premier Ace Magashule announced his new Executive Council, in which Kgothule served as MEC for Sports, Arts, Culture and Recreation.

While in that office, Kgothule made national headlines when he was arrested for speeding in his BMW 745i on the N1 highway in Glen outside Bloemfontein. His speed had been recorded at 235km/h, which was the highest speed recorded nationally over the 2010–2011 festive season. He was arrested on 30 December 2011 and released on bail. The Bloemfontein Magistrate's Court found him guilty and, on 5 January 2011, sentenced him to pay a fine of R20,000 or serve 12 months in prison. His driving license was not revoked on condition that he did not repeat the same offence within five years. Kgothule apologised to the court for his conduct.

He departed the Executive Council upon the end of the legislative term in 2014, when he did not stand for re-election to the provincial legislature in the 2014 general election. In 2015, he told a local newspaper that he remained a full ANC member.
