= Hans Nketu =

South African politician (1965–2022)

Personal details
- Born: Petrus Moferefere Nketu; 12 February 1965
- Died: 16 October 2022 (aged 57)
- Citizenship: South Africa
- Political party: African National Congress
- Nicknames: Hans; Hanz

Petrus Moferefere "Hans" Nketu (12 February 1965 – 16 October 2022) was a South African politician who represented the African National Congress (ANC) in the Free State Provincial Legislature. Born on 12 February 1965, Nketu died on 16 October 2022.
