= Dévar Smit =

South African politician

Hon Dévar Smit

Member of the Free State Provincial Legislature
- In office 22 May 2019 – May 2021
- Succeeded by: Armand Cloete

Personal details
- Born: Dévar Smit; 22 February 1989 (age 37) Utrecht
- Party: Freedom Front Plus
- Education: University of the Free State
- Occupation: Politician, teacher

Dévar Smit is a South African politician and educator who served as a member of the Free State Provincial Legislature from 2019 to 2021. Smit is a member of the Freedom Front Plus

== Background ==
Smit grew up in Newcastle, KwaZulu-Natal and matriculated from Glenwood High School in Durban. He studied at the University of the Free State where he graduated with a degree in human movement sciences. Smit proceeded to work as a teacher for five years after that.

Smit's grandfather, Frank Thomas, had served as the assistant treasurer of Walvis Bay in Namibia and later as town treasurer of Stanger and Greytown in KwaZulu-Natal. Smit took an interest in politics at a young age after listening to his grandfather's stories about politicians and city councils.

== Political career ==
Smit served as a councillor of the Mangaung Metropolitan Municipality until his election to the Free State Provincial Legislature in May 2019. He took office on 22 May 2019 and was the sole representative of the Freedom Front Plus.

In May 2021, he resigned from the provincial legislature due to personal circumstances. FF Plus NCOP MP Armand Cloete took over as the party's representative in the provincial legislature.
