= Lucy Mapena =

South African politician

Lucy Mapena MPL

Deputy Speaker of the Free State Provincial Legislature
- Incumbent
- Assumed office 22 May 2019
- Preceded by: Sizwe Mbalo

Member of the Free State Provincial Legislature
- Incumbent
- Assumed office 21 May 2014

Personal details
- Party: African National Congress
- Profession: Politician

Lucy Nombulelo Mapena is a South African politician who has been serving as the deputy speaker of the Free State Provincial Legislature since May 2019. A member of the African National Congress, she was elected to the provincial legislature in May 2014.

== Political career ==
Mapena is a member of the African National Congress. Prior to the provincial election held on 7 May 2014, Mapena was ranked fourteenth on the party's provincial list. She was elected to the Free State Provincial Legislature as the ANC won 22 seats. Mapena was sworn in as an MPL on 21 May 2014.

Before the provincial election of 8 May 2019, Mapena was placed fifteenth on the ANC's provincial list. She won re-election as the ANC won 19 seats. She was sworn in for her second term on 22 May 2019. On the same day, Mapena was elected deputy speaker of the legislature, deputising for Zanele Sifuba.
