= Heinrich Smit =

Heinrich Smit may refer to:

- Heinrich Smit (rugby union)
- Heinrich Smit (politician)
