= Thembinkosi Rawula =

South African politician

Member of the National Assembly of South Africa
- In office 31 October 2015 – 10 April 2019

Personal details
- Born: Thembinkosi Rawula
- Party: ActionSA (2023–present)
- Other political affiliations: Socialist Revolutionary Workers Party (2019–2023); Economic Freedom Fighters (Until 2019)
- Education: Nelson Mandela University; University of Johannesburg; University of South Africa
- Profession: Politician

Thembinkosi Rawula is a South African politician. He was a senior member of the Economic Freedom Fighters and a Member of Parliament for the party until he resigned in April 2019 after accusing party leaders of financial mismanagement.

== Early life and education ==
Rawula is from the Eastern Cape. He holds a bachelor's degree in public administration from Nelson Mandela University, a post-graduate diploma in labour law from the University of Johannesburg and an honours degree in Public Administration from the University of South Africa.

== Career ==
He was the labour coordinator of the National Union of Metalworkers of South Africa (NUMSA) in the Eastern Cape between 2003 and 2006. From 2014 to 2015, he was employed as a human resource and capacity building advisor.

== Political career ==
Rawula served on the Central Command Team of the Economic Freedom Fighters as the member responsible for the party's labour and trade union relations. He was sworn in as a Member of the National Assembly for the party on 31 October 2015. He replaced Kgotso Morapela, who was redeployed to the Free State Provincial Legislature. During his tenure as a parliamentarian, he was a member of the following portfolio committees: tourism, mineral resources and labour.

On 5 April 2019, Rawula accused party leader Julius Malema and his former deputy Floyd Shivambu of abusing party funds to fund their lifestyles. On 7 April, he said that Malema's lawyers had demanded that he retract the accusations. On 10 April, Rawula resigned from the EFF and automatically ceased to be a member of parliament. He then joined NUMSA's political party, the Socialist Revolutionary Workers Party, on 16 April.

On 21 May 2019, Malema filed a defamation lawsuit against Rawula. The case was heard in November and the Eastern Cape division of the High Court ruled in favour of Rawula.

On 9 October 2023, Rawula was announced as a member of ActionSA during a press conference held in Gqeberha.
