= Fourth Raadsaal =

Parliamentary building in Bloemfontein, South Africa

Coordinates: 29°06′57″S 26°13′05″E

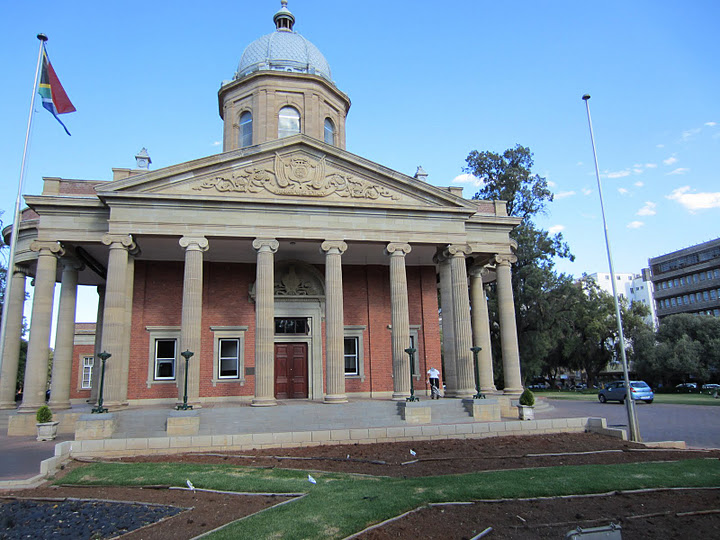
The building in December 2011

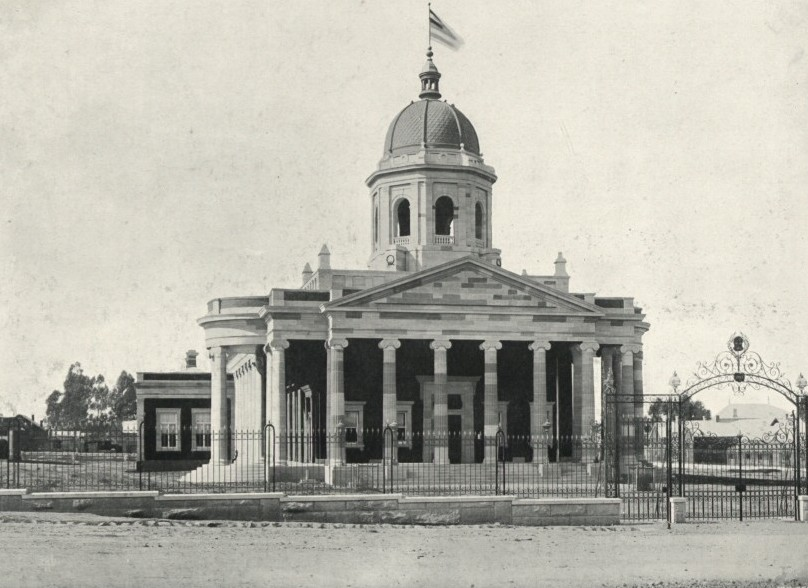
Historic photo of the building

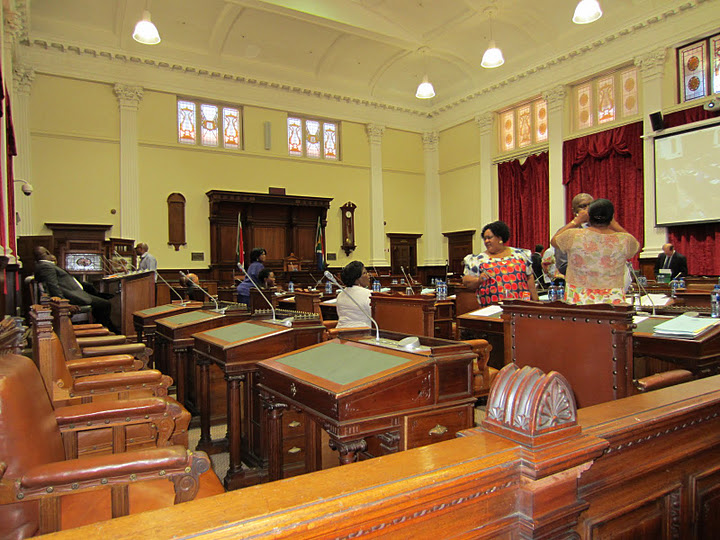
The legislative chamber in December 2011

The Fourth Raadsaal (Afrikaans: Vierde Raadsaal) is a historic building in Bloemfontein, South Africa, which serves as the meeting place of the Free State Provincial Legislature, the legislature of the Free State. It is located opposite the Supreme Court of Appeal in President Brand Street.

In the early 1880s, it was resolved to build a new presidency office and chamber council. The designs for both buildings were awarded to Johannesburg-based Lennox Canning. The new presidency office was completed in 1886, yet work on the chamber council had not begun until 1889 when a tender of £27,183.10 was accepted by another Johannesburg-based architect, TR Robertson. State President of the Orange Free State Francis William Reitz laid the foundation stone on 27 June 1890. Due to construction issues, another tender of £12,500 was awarded to JJ Kirkness. The new building was formally inaugurated on 5 June 1893 when the members walked from the old chamber to the new one. A further £4,000 were spent on internal furnishings over the following years.

In March 1900, British forces occupied Bloemfontein and the building became a military hospital. Most of the furnishings were acquired and are now in private homes. The Orange River Colony became the legitimate government in 1907. The colony had a two-chamber legislature consisting of a council and a legislative assembly. The lower council continued to meet in the Raadsaal, while a separate building facing Aliwal Street housed the upper house. In 1910, the Union of South Africa, was formed and the Raadsaal housed the provincial council. The chamber and its rooms were occupied by the Appeal Court until its own premises was ultimately built in 1929.

After the first non-racial elections in 1994, a decision was taken to house the newly-established provincial legislature in the building.
