= MAP16 Civic Movement =

Political party in South Africa

- Abbreviation: MAP16
- Founded: 2018
- Split from: African National Congress

The MAP16 Civic Movement (MAP16) is a minor South African political party. It was formed after sixteen African National Congress (ANC) local councillors from the Maluti-a-Phofung Local Municipality were expelled by the ANC for voting to unseat the ANC mayor Vusi Tshabalala, who faced a number of corruption charges.

In the wake of the dismissals, by-elections were held in September 2018 in fifteen wards, and the expelled councillors stood as independents, winning back ten of the fifteen seats.

MAP16 contested the 2021 Maluti-a-Phofung Local Municipality elections, winning twenty seats, while the ANC lost its majority, being reduced from 47 to 28 seats. Subsequently, MAP16 formed a coalition along with the Economic Freedom Fighters, Dikwankwetla Party, African Transformation Movement, African Independent Congress and the South African Royal Kingdoms Organization, supported by the Democratic Alliance and Freedom Front Plus, to take control of the municipality.

== Election results ==
=== Municipal elections ===
Election	Votes	%	Seats
2021	68,502	0.22%	20
