= Heinrich Smit (politician) =

South African politician

Member of the Free State Provincial Legislature
- In office 22 May 2019 – 17 September 2022

Personal details
- Born: 1955
- Died: 17 September 2022 (aged 67)
- Citizenship: South Africa
- Party: African National Congress

Heinrich Charl "Sandlana" Smit (1955 – 17 September 2022) was a South African politician who represented the African National Congress (ANC) in the Free State Provincial Legislature from May 2019 until his death in September 2022. He was first elected to the provincial legislature in the 2019 general election, ranked 19th on the ANC's provincial party list.

Smit was born in 1955 and joined the ANC in 1994, the year that apartheid ended. His local ANC branch was in Mangaung in the Free State. He held a range of full-time positions in the provincial party administration and in the provincial government, including in the provincial Department of Agriculture and Rural Development and as liaison officer for minorities in the office of the Premier, Ace Magashule. In 2012 he told News24 that he was a die-hard political supporter of Magashule.

Smit died on 17 September 2022, aged 67, at a guesthouse in Bloemfontein. His body was found in his car outside the guesthouse.
