= Jabulane Radebe =

South African politician

Member of the Free State Provincial Legislature
- In office 22 May 2019 – 2023

Personal details
- Citizenship: South Africa
- Party: African National Congress

Jabulane Michael Radebe is a South African politician who represented the African National Congress (ANC) in the Free State Provincial Legislature from 2019 until 2023. He was first elected to the provincial legislature in the 2019 general election, ranked seventh on the ANC's provincial party list.

He resigned from the legislature in 2023.
