= Mandisa Makesini =

South African politician (born 1975)

Mandisa Makesini MP

Permanent Delegate to the National Council of Provinces from the Free State
- Incumbent
- Assumed office 15 June 2024

Member of the National Assembly of South Africa
- In office 8 February 2023 – 28 May 2024

Member of the Free State Provincial Legislature
- In office 21 May 2014 – January 2023

Provincial Chairperson of the Economic Freedom Fighters
- In office September 2018 – November 2022
- Preceded by: Kgotso Morapela
- Succeeded by: Mapheule Liphoko

Personal details
- Born: Mandisa Makesini; 20 September 1975 (age 50)
- Party: Economic Freedom Fighters
- Profession: Politician

Mandisa Makesini (born 20 September 1975) is a South African politician who has been a Permanent Delegate to the National Council of Provinces from the Free State since 2024. She previously served in the Free State Provincial Legislature and in the National Assembly of South Africa. Makesini is a former provincial chairperson of the Economic Freedom Fighters.

== Political career ==
Makesini was elected to the Free State Provincial Legislature in the 2014 general election alongside Jacob Tshabalala as one of two members of the Economic Freedom Fighters. At the EFF's provincial conference in September 2018, Makesini was elected provincial chairperson of the EFF, defeating incumbent Kgotso Morapela by three votes. On her election, Makesini said that it was a sign that patriarchy was being defeated.

Makesini was re-elected to a second term in the provincial legislature in 2019. She unsuccessfully sought re-election as EFF provincial chairperson at the party's conference in November 2022, losing to Mapheule Liphoko in a vote that went 343 for Liphoko and 278 votes for Makesini. EFF President Julius Malema lamented her loss, criticising the delegates for not electing a woman as provincial chairperson.

Makesini resigned from the provincial legislature in January 2023 and was replaced by Liphoko. She was subsequently sworn in as a member of the National Assembly of South Africa on 8 February 2023.

Following the 2024 general election, Makesini was appointed to take up a seat in the National Council of Provinces where she represents the Free State as the sole EFF member of the provincial delegation.
