= Thabo Meeko =

South African politician

Member of the Free State Executive Council for Small Business Development, Tourism and Environmental Affairs
- In office 14 March 2023 – 14 June 2024
- Premier: Mxolisi Dukwana
- Preceded by: Makalo Mohale
- Succeeded by: Office abolished

Member of the Free State Provincial Legislature
- Incumbent
- Assumed office 21 May 2014

Personal details
- Citizenship: South Africa
- Party: African National Congress

Thabo Piet Meeko is a South African politician who represented the African National Congress (ANC) in the Free State Provincial Legislature from 2014 until 2024. He was first elected to the provincial legislature in the 2014 general election, ranked 15th on the ANC's provincial party list, and he was re-elected in the 2019 general election, ranked 16th. During that period he has also served as spokesperson for the ANC's Free State branch.

In March 2023, Meeko was appointed as Member of the Executive Council (MEC) for Small Business Development, Tourism and Environmental Affairs. He left the provincial legislature at the 2024 general election.
