= Armand Cloete =

South African politician

Armand Cloete MPL

Permanent delegate to the National Council of Provinces from the Free State
- In office 23 May 2019 – 4 May 2021

Member of the Free State Provincial Legislature
- Incumbent
- Assumed office 4 May 2021

Personal details
- Born: Armand Benjamin Cloete Orange Free State, South Africa
- Party: Freedom Front Plus
- Other political affiliations: Democratic Alliance
- Education: University of the Free State
- Occupation: Member of the Provincial Legislature
- Profession: Politician

Armand Benjamin Cloete is a South African politician who has been a member of the Free State Provincial Legislature since 2021. He had previously served as a permanent delegate to the National Council of Provinces from the Free State from 2019 to 2021. Cloete is a member of the Freedom Front Plus (FF Plus).

== Biography ==
He studied at the University of the Free State. He worked for the Democratic Alliance as a Media Liaison Officer before joining the FF Plus. He was elected to the National Council of Provinces following the 2019 South African general election held on 8 May. Cloete was sworn in as an MP on 23 May 2019. He was one of six permanent delegates from the Free State.

On 4 May 2021, he was sworn in as a member of the Free State Provincial Legislature. He replaced Devar Smit, who resigned. Michiel De Bruyn was appointed to the NCOP.

Cloete is married and resides in Bloemfontein.
