= Mantlhake Maboya =

South African politician

The Honourable Mantlhake Maboya MPL

MEC for Education
- Incumbent
- Assumed office 20 June 2024
- Premier: Maqueen Letsoha-Mathae

Deputy speaker of the Free State Provincial Legislature
- In office 14 June 2024 – 20 June 2024

Personal details
- Born: Mantlhake Julia Maboya
- Citizenship: South Africa
- Party: African National Congress (ANC)
- Profession: Politician

Mantlhake Julia Maboya is a South African politician who has served as a MEC for the Free State Department of Education since 20 June 2024.
