= Malitaba Moleleki =

South African politician

Malitaba Moleleki MPL

Member of the Free State Provincial Legislature
- Incumbent
- Assumed office 21 May 2014

Personal details
- Born: 1959 or 1960 (age 66–67)
- Citizenship: South Africa
- Party: African National Congress

Malitaba Sarah Moleleki (born 1959 or 1960) is a South African politician who has represented the African National Congress (ANC) in the Free State Provincial Legislature since 2014. Before that, she was the Mayor of Maluti-a-Phofung Local Municipality in the Free State until her resignation in September 2013.

== Early life and career ==
Moleleki was born in 1959 or 1960. She formerly represented the ANC as a local councillor in the Free State. She was a Member of the Mayoral Committee and council Chief Whip in Thabo Mofutsanyana District Municipality and she also served as Mayor of Phuthaditjhaba. She was subsequently the Mayor of Maluti-a-Phofung Local until September 2013, when she resigned amid allegations of procurement irregularities.

== Provincial legislature ==
Moleleki was first elected to the Free State Provincial Legislature in the 2014 general election, ranked 12th on the ANC's provincial party list. She was re-elected to her seat in the 2019 general election, ranked 18th on the ANC's party list.

On 28 May 2016, while she was serving her first term in the legislature, she was arrested in a Woolworths on Adderley Street in Cape Town after a CCTV operator observed her shoplifting. She attempted to leave the store with earrings and nail polish, worth R259, that she had not paid for. Moleleki said that she had mistakenly put the items in her handbag along with her cell phone after being distracted by a phone call. However, IOL reported that the CCTV footage showed that Moleleki had unpackaged the items and "concealed" them in her pocket and handbag. She appeared in the Cape Town Community Court and, after meeting with a social worker, was recommended for a "diversion" from the criminal justice system, in which the criminal charges against her were withdrawn and she was referred to a "theft intervention" programme. The opposition Democratic Alliance subsequently reported her to the provincial legislature's ethics committee. At the time of the incident, she was also a member of the Provincial Executive Committee of the ANC's Free State branch.
