= Ketso Makume =

South African politician (1972)

Ketso Makume MPL

Member of the Executive Council of the Free State for Finance, Tourism and Economic Development
- Incumbent
- Assumed office 23 June 2024
- Premier: Maqueen Letsoha-Mathae
- Preceded by: New office

Member of the Executive Council of the Free State for Cooperative Governance and Traditional Affairs and Human Settlements
- In office 14 March 2023 – 14 June 2023
- Premier: Mxolisi Dukwana
- Preceded by: Mxolisi Dukwana
- Succeeded by: Saki Mokoena

Member of the Free State Provincial Legislature
- Incumbent
- Assumed office 13 March 2023

Deputy Provincial Chairperson of the African National Congress
- Incumbent
- Assumed office 22 January 2023
- Preceded by: William Bulwane

Personal details
- Born: 30 November 1972 (age 53)
- Party: African National Congress

Moses Ketso "Toto" Makume (born 30 November 1972) is a South African politician who has been a Member of the Free State Executive Council for Finance, Tourism and Economic Development since 2024 and a Member of the Free State Provincial Legislature since March 2023. He was previously the Free State MEC for Cooperative Governance and Traditional Affairs and Human Settlements from 2023 until 2024. Makume was elected as the Deputy Provincial Chairperson of the African National Congress in January 2023.

== Political career ==
In May 2021, Makume was named to the Interim Provincial Committee (IPC) of the African National Congress after the Supreme Court of Appeal ruled that the party's 2018 provincial elective conference was unlawful and nullified the provincial leadership elected at the conference.

At the ANC's provincial elective conference held from 21 to 22 January 2023, Makume was nominated from the conference floor for the position of Deputy Provincial Chairperson; he defeated former Mangaung mayor Thabo Manyoni, winning the position with 346 votes while Manyoni received only 307 votes.

== Free State provincial government ==
Makume was sworn in as a Member of the Free State Provincial Legislature on 13 March 2023. The following day, he was appointed to the Executive Council of the Free State as the Member of the Executive Council for Cooperative Governance and Traditional Affairs and Human Settlements by premier Mxolisi Dukwana, who he succeeded as MEC for the portfolio.

Makume was promoted to MEC for Finance, Tourism and Economic Development following the 2024 general election.
