= African Content Movement =

Political party from South Africa

- President: Hlaudi Motsoeneng
- Founded: 13 December 2018
- Split from: African National Congress
- Ideology: African socialism Economic nationalism
- National Assembly seats: 0 / 400
- Provincial Legislatures: 0 / 430

Website
- acmovement.org.za

The African Content Movement (ACM) is a South African political party founded in December 2018 by former SABC acting COO Hlaudi Motsoeneng.

== History ==
At the party launch, Motsoeneng claimed he would become president, that the country would produce 90% of its requirements, that the economy shall be in the hands of the people, make company workers shareholders, force foreign companies to leave the country and reduce social grants.

In 2019, the party gained two seats in Gauteng municipalities after local councillors from the Randfontein People's Party joined the ACM.

It also won two seats in Maluti a Phofung in the 2021 municipal election.

In March 2019, Motsoeneng encouraged former president Jacob Zuma to join the ACM, stating that they shared the same views on transformation.

The party contested the 2019 general election, with Motsoeneng, and actress and former Idols South Africa judge Marah Louw in first and second places respectively on the party's national list, winning 0.03% of the vote and failing to win a seat.

Motsoeneng stated that he "was not really serious and at the time [...] did not even understand the art of politics" but that he intended to contest the 2024 general election both nationally and in the Free State province. The party again failed to win any seats.

== Election results ==
=== National Assembly elections ===
Election	Party leader	Total votes	Share of vote	Seats	+/–	Government
2019	Hlaudi Motsoeneng	4,841	0.03%	0 / 400	New	Extra-parliamentary
2024	Hlaudi Motsoeneng	5,107	0.03% (Note: From 2024, seats in the National Assembly are determined by a combination of the national ballot, and the nine regional ballots. Only the national ballot figures are shown here.)	0 / 400	0	Extra-parliamentary

=== Provincial elections ===
Election	Eastern Cape		Free State		Gauteng		Kwazulu-Natal		Limpopo		Mpumalanga		North-West		Northern Cape		Western Cape	
Election	%	Seats	%	Seats	%	Seats	%	Seats	%	Seats	%	Seats	%	Seats	%	Seats	%	Seats
2019	0.02	0/63	0.21	0/30	0.03	0/73	0.04	0/80	0.02	0/49	0.03	0/30	0.04	0/33	0.03	0/30	0.01	0/42
2024			0.53	0/30														

== Municipal elections ==
The party won seventeen seats in the Free State in the 2026 South African municipal elections.
