= Zanele Sifuba =

South African politician (born 1968)

Zanele Sifuba MPL
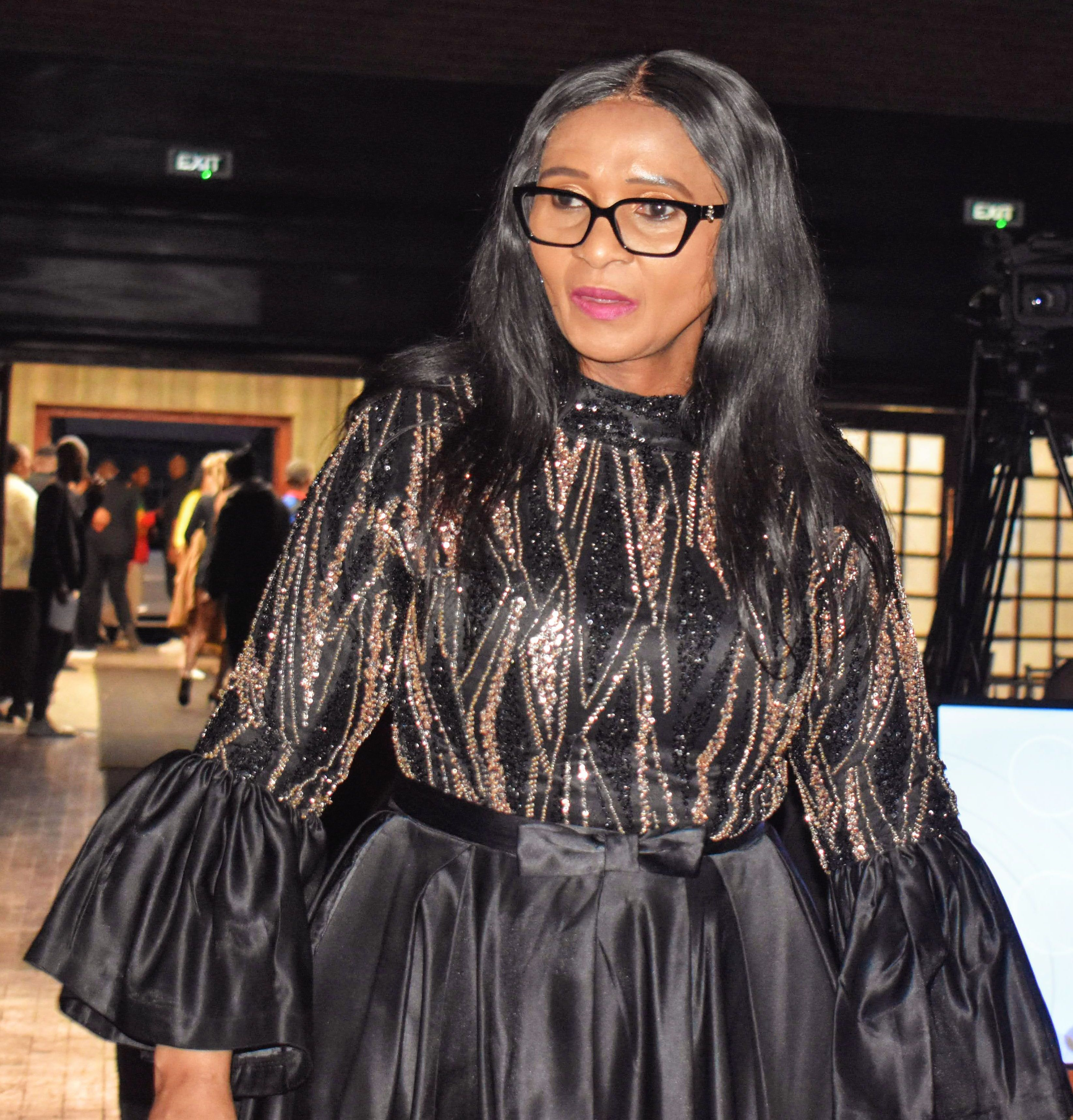

Member of the Free State Executive Council for Sports, Arts, Culture & Recreation
- Incumbent
- Assumed office 23 June 2024
- Premier: Maqueen Letsoha-Mathae
- Preceded by: Limakatso Mahasa

Speaker of the Free State Provincial Legislature
- In office 22 May 2019 – 23 June 2024
- Deputy: Lucy Mapena
- Preceded by: Mamiki Qabathe
- Succeeded by: Mxolisi Dukwana

Member of the Free State Provincial Legislature
- Incumbent
- Assumed office 22 May 2019

Personal details
- Born: Ntombizanele Beauty Sifuba; 14 November 1968 (age 57)
- Party: African National Congress
- Children: 3
- Education: Vista University; Central University of Technology; University of the Free State
- Profession: Politician

Ntombizanele Beauty Sifuba (born 14 November 1968) is a South African politician and educator who has been the Member of the Free State Executive Council for Sports, Arts, Culture & Recreation since 2024 and a member of the Free State Provincial Legislature since 2019. She served as the speaker of the provincial legislature between 2019 and 2024. Sifuba is a member of the African National Congress.

== Education ==
In 1988, Sifuba obtained a bachelor of arts in education from Vista University. From the Central University of Technology, she holds a bachelor of psychology. In 2017, Sifuba attained a postgraduate diploma in governance and political transformation from the University of the Free State. She is currently pursuing a master's degree in the same field.

== Career ==
=== Teaching career ===
Sifuba worked as a teacher from 1999 to 2019. She also worked as the deputy director responsible for monitoring and evaluation at the provincial Department of Social Development.

=== Political career ===
In 1995, she was elected deputy secretary of the African National Congress in the party's President Steyn region. She also held leadership positions in the South African Democratic Teachers Union. Sifuba was the deputy provincial chairperson of COSATU. Sifuba is currently a member of the ANC's subcommittees on economic development and gender and equity.

In March 2019, Sifuba was placed twelfth on the ANC's provincial list. She was elected as the ANC won 19 seats in the Free State Provincial Legislature. Sifuba was sworn in as an MPL on 22 May 2019. On the same day, she was elected speaker. She was re-elected as speaker after the 2024 provincial election. Shortly afterwards, Sifuba was appointed as the Member of the Executive Council responsible for Sports, Arts, Culture & Recreation.

== Controversy ==
In November 2022, Sifuba appeared in a sex tape that was shared widely on social media. Sifuba opened a case against the person who shared the video, while her office did not respond to the video. She refused to identify the person to the police.
