= African Congress for Transformation =

South African political party

- Founder: Ace Magashule
- Founded: August 2023
- Split from: African National Congress
- Ideology: Pan-Africanism; African nationalism Democratic socialism
- Political position: Left-wing
- National Assembly seats: 0 / 400
- Provincial Legislatures: 1 / 430

Website
- actonline.org.za

The African Congress for Transformation (ACT) is a South African political party founded in August 2023 by former African National Congress (ANC) Secretary General, Premier of the Free State Ace Magashule, and fired Hawks boss Berning Ntlemeza.

As of August 2023, Magashule faces a number of corruption charges, and was expelled from the ANC in June 2023. Ntlemeza's controversial reign as Hawks chief ended when he was fired from the Hawks by then Minister of Police Fikile Mbalula following a High Court ruling that Ntlemeza lacked integrity and was not fit to hold public office, after lying under oath in a matter about previous head Shadrack Sibiya.

ACT intended to contest the 2024 elections but failed to submit all of its lists in time, and will only be appearing in certain regions.

In January 2024, Magashule announced a "united front" and "amalgamation" between his party and the uMkhonto we Sizwe Party.

== Election results ==
=== National Assembly elections ===
Election	Party leader	Total votes	Share of vote	Seats	+/–	Government
2024	Ace Magashule	18,354	0.11% (Note: From 2024, seats in the National Assembly are determined by a combination of the national ballot, and the nine regional ballots. Only the national ballot figures are shown here.)	0 / 400	New	Extra-parliamentary

=== Provincial elections ===
Election	Eastern Cape		Free State		Gauteng		Kwazulu-Natal		Limpopo		Mpumalanga		North-West		Northern Cape		Western Cape	
Election	%	Seats	%	Seats	%	Seats	%	Seats	%	Seats	%	Seats	%	Seats	%	Seats	%	Seats
2024	0.06	0/73	1.83	1/30	0.06	0/80							0.18	0/38	0.11	0/30		
