= Sisi Ntombela =

South African politician (born 1957)

The Honourable Sisi Ntombela
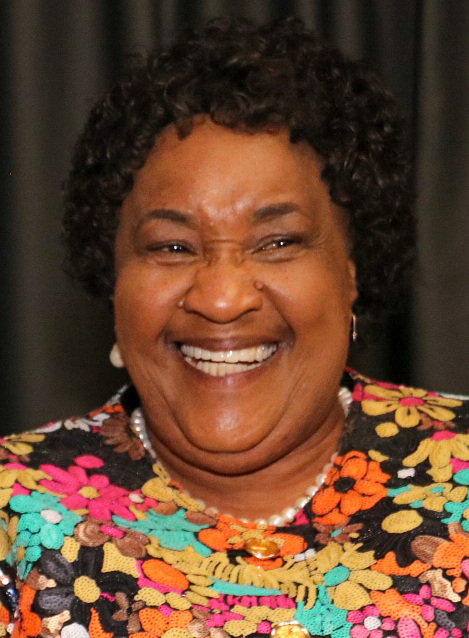
- Ntombela in 2022

6th Premier of the Free State
- In office 27 March 2018 – 21 February 2023
- Preceded by: Ace Magashule
- Succeeded by: Mxolisi Dukwana

Member of the Free State Executive Council for Cooperative Governance, Traditional Affairs and Human Settlements
- In office 3 October 2016 – 27 March 2018
- Premier: Ace Magashule
- Preceded by: Olly Mlamleli
- Succeeded by: Oupa Khoabane

Member of the Free State Executive Council for Social Development
- In office 11 May 2009 – 3 October 2016
- Premier: Ace Magashule
- Preceded by: Mantsheng Tsopo
- Succeeded by: Limakatso Mahasa

Member of the National Assembly of South Africa
- In office 2001–2004

Member of the Free State Provincial Legislature
- In office 2004 – 21 February 2023
- In office 1999–2001

Personal details
- Born: 16 April 1957 (age 69) Tweeling, Free State, South Africa
- Party: African National Congress
- Spouse: Madala Ntombela
- Profession: Politician

Sefora Hixsonia "Sisi" Ntombela (born 16 April 1957) is a South African politician who was the 6th Premier of the Free State and a Member of the Free State Provincial Legislature for the African National Congress. She previously served as the Free State MEC for Cooperative Governance and Traditional Affairs and Human Settlements and as MEC for Social Development. Ntombela was also the Deputy President of the African National Congress Women's League and the treasurer of the Free State ANC.

== Early life and career ==
One of six children, Sefora Hixsonia Ntombela was born in the small farming town of Tweeling in the Free State. She was given the nickname of "Sisi" at a young age. She attended the Tweeling Combine School and matriculated from Kganyeng Secondary School. She went on to study at Bonamelo Training College and returned to the Tweeling Combine School as a teacher.

Due to Apartheid and the tense political situation at the time, she secretly taught her pupils about Nelson Mandela. One of the pupils was the school principal's child and reported her for the secret lessons. She left the teaching profession due to the matter.

== Political career ==
Ntombela worked for the Department of Health as a family planner and youth consultant.

Later on, Ntombela became a member of the African National Congress and was elected the chairperson of the Tweeling African National Congress Women's League branch. She soon became Regional Chairperson. Following the 1994 elections, Ntombela was elected mayor of the Tweeling municipality and served in the position until her election to the Free State Provincial Legislature in 1999. She remained in the legislature until she was appointed to the National Assembly in 2001. She returned to the provincial legislature in 2004 and was named as chairperson of both the Social Development and Health Portfolio Committees.

In May 2009, newly elected Free State Premier Ace Magashule announced that Ntombela would take up the post of MEC for Social Development. Ntombela was elected Deputy President of the African National Congress Women's League in August 2015. Magashule reshuffled his Executive Council in October 2016 and appointed Ntombela to the Cooperative Governance and Traditional Affairs and Human Settlements portfolio of the Executive Council.

== Premiership ==
In March 2018, Ntombela was selected by the African National Congress to succeed Ace Magashule as Premier of the Free State. She took office on 27 March 2018 and became the fourth female Premier of the province. She was elected Treasurer of the Free State ANC branch in May 2018. Following the May 2019 elections, the African National Congress announced that it had retained Ntombela in her position as Premier of the Free State. She was elected to a full term when the legislature reconvened on 22 May 2019.

At the ANC's provincial conference held in January 2023, Ntombela was defeated by the former convenor of the interim provincial committee (IPC) and MEC in her cabinet Mxolisi Dukwana in the election for the provincial chairperson of the party. She also failed to gain election to the Provincial Executive Committee. On 5 February 2023, Daily Maverick had reported that the newly elected ANC PEC had taken the decision to recall Ntombela as premier. On 21 February 2023, Ntombela tendered her resignation after consultations with the ANC's national leadership. Dukwana succeeded her as premier.

== Personal life ==
Ntombela is married to ANC Member of Parliament, Madala Ntombela. She tested positive for COVID-19 in October 2020.
