= Mxolisi Dukwana =

South African politician (born 1964)

Mxolisi Dukwana MPL
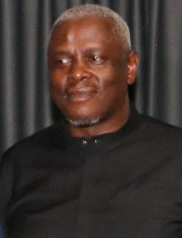
- Dukwana in 2022

Speaker of the Free State Provincial Legislature
- Incumbent
- Assumed office 27 June 2024
- Deputy: Nolitha Ndungan
- Preceded by: Zanele Sifuba

7th Premier of the Free State
- In office 24 February 2023 – 14 June 2024
- Preceded by: Sisi Ntombela
- Succeeded by: Maqueen Letsoha-Mathae

Provincial Chairperson of the African National Congress
- Incumbent
- Assumed office 22 January 2023
- Deputy: Ketso Makume
- Preceded by: Sam Mashinini

Member of the Free State Executive Council for Cooperative Governance and Traditional Affairs
- In office 1 October 2021 – 24 February 2023
- Premier: Sisi Ntombela
- Preceded by: Thembeni Nxangisa
- Succeeded by: Ketso Makume

Member of the Free State Provincial Legislature
- Incumbent
- Assumed office 28 September 2021

Member of the Free State Executive Council for Economic Development, Tourism and Environmental Affairs
- In office 22 October 2008 – 22 February 2012
- Premier: Beatrice Marshoff; Ace Magashule
- Preceded by: Neo Masithela
- Succeeded by: Mamiki Qabathe

Personal details
- Born: Mxolisi Abraham Dukwana; 14 September 1964 (age 61) Odendaalsrus, Orange Free State; South Africa
- Party: African National Congress

Mxolisi Abraham Dukwana (born 14 September 1964) is a South African politician who has served as the speaker of the Free State Provincial Legislature since June 2024. He was elected Provincial Chairperson of the Free State branch of his political party, the African National Congress (ANC), in January 2023. He was the seventh Premier of the Free State from February 2023 until June 2024. Prior to his election as Premier, he served in the Free State Executive Council as Member of the Executive Council (MEC) for Cooperative Governance and Traditional Affairs since October 2021.

A teacher by training, Dukwana entered provincial government as MEC for Education from 1996 to 1998. Between 1998 and 2008, he held several positions in the Free State Provincial Legislature, where he was Majority Chief Whip, Deputy Speaker, and Speaker. Over the same period he rose through the provincial ANC, ultimately serving as Provincial Treasurer of the ANC in the Free State from 2005 to 2012. In 2008, he was returned to the Executive Council by Premier Beatrice Marshoff, under whom he served as MEC for Public Safety and Security in 2008 and MEC for Economic Development, Tourism, and Environmental Affairs from 2008 to 2009. He was retained in the latter portfolio by Marshoff's successor, Ace Magashule.

In February 2012, however, Magashule fired Dukwana; later the same year, Dukwana attempted unsuccessfully to unseat Magashule as ANC Provincial Chairperson. He subsequently retreated from frontline politics until May 2021, when he was appointed the interim convenor of the ANC's Free State branch. In September of that year, he was sworn back into the Free State Provincial Legislature, and, in early October, Premier Sisi Ntombela appointed him as MEC for Cooperative Governance and Traditional Affairs. In January 2023, Dukwana narrowly beat Ntombela to be elected ANC Provincial Chairperson, and he replaced her as Premier the following month.

== Early life and career ==
Dukwana was born on 14 September 1964 in Odendaalsrus in the former Orange Free State (present-day Free State Province). He trained as a teacher in Kroonstad and taught at a secondary school in Odendaalsrus from 1986 to 1993. In the same period, he was active in the South African Youth Congress, an anti-apartheid organisation. In 1994, he was appointed as a Commissioner for the post-apartheid government's Reconstruction and Development Programme.

== Career in government ==
Between 1996 and 1998, he sat in the Free State Executive Council as Member of the Executive Council (MEC) for Education. After that, he served his political party, the African National Congress (ANC), as an ordinary Member of the Free State Provincial Legislature, first as Majority Chief Whip from 1998 to 1999 and then as Deputy Speaker from 1999 to 2001. In 2001, he was elected Speaker of the Free State Provincial Legislature.

=== Marshoff premiership: 2004–2009 ===
In June 2005, at a party elective conference, Dukwana was elected Provincial Treasurer of the ANC's Free State branch, serving under Ace Magashule, the longstanding ANC Provincial Chairperson. While in that party office, he continued to serve as Speaker of the provincial legislature, until in January 2008 he was returned to the Executive Council by Beatrice Marshoff, then the Premier of the Free State. In a cabinet reshuffle, Marshoff appointed him MEC for Public Safety and Security.

Later that year, in July 2008, Dukwana was re-elected unopposed as ANC Provincial Treasurer. Three months later, in another cabinet reshuffle in October, Marshoff moved him to the Economic Development, Tourism and Environmental Affairs portfolio of the Executive Council. In February 2009, he additionally became acting MEC for Education, after the incumbent, Casca Mokitlane, resigned in order to defect from the ANC to the Congress of the People.

=== Magashule premiership: 2009–2018 ===
==== Dismissal ====
Pursuant to the general election in May 2009, Ace Magashule succeeded Marshoff as Premier of the Free State. Dukwana was retained as MEC for Economic Development, Tourism and Environmental Affairs in Magashule's new Executive Council. At this time, Dukwana was viewed as a close political ally of Magashule and as Magashule's possible successor. However, their relationship had deteriorated by 2012: in February of that year, Magashule fired Dukwana from the Executive Council. The opposition Democratic Alliance alleged that Magashule had made the move because he viewed Dukwana as a political threat, rather than because of his performance as an MEC.

==== Bid for ANC chair ====
Dukwana's removal from the Executive Council coincided with his final months in his party office as ANC Provincial Treasurer. Instead of seeking re-election to that office, he launched a campaign to oust Magashule from the party chairmanship. By April 2012, the Mail & Guardian identified him as the centre of a provincial ANC faction known as the "Regime Change Group", which lobbied for Dukwana's election as ANC Provincial Chairperson. Other members of the group reportedly included (at least initially) Sibongile Besani, who was the outgoing ANC Provincial Secretary, as well as leaders of the Free State's ANC Youth League. The group argued that Magashule, during his tenure as ANC leader and Premier, had presided over a corrupt administration and promoted his own loyalists over competent politicians.

However, when the ANC's provincial elective conference opened in June 2012, Dukwana announced that he and his supporters would boycott the conference. He alleged that the election had been rigged to favour Magashule. He also suggested that the national leadership of the ANC had conspired with Magashule to manipulate the electoral process in order to ensure that the Free State ANC elected a sympathetic provincial leadership: Dukwana's faction was reported to favour ANC Deputy President Kgalema Motlanthe, who would stand for the ANC presidency in December 2012, while Magashule was a strong supporter of incumbent ANC President Jacob Zuma.

=== Ntombela premiership: 2018–2022 ===
==== Zondo Commission ====
Six years after he fired Dukwana, Magashule left provincial government to become national ANC Secretary-General and was succeeded in the Premier's office by Sisi Ntombela. Dukwana remained an outspoken critic of Magashule – indeed, in 2021, the Mail & Guardian called him Magashule's "arch-nemesis". In November 2020, he took part in a protest of ANC members who marched on the party's provincial headquarters to demand that the Special Investigating Unit investigate Magashule's role in alleged corruption and maladministration during his tenure as Premier.

In 2019, while testifying at the Zondo Commission, Dukwana made a number of accusations about Magashule's alleged involvement in state capture under President Zuma's administration. Among other things, he alleged that Magashule had accepted bribes from the controversial Gupta family; Dukwana said that Tony Gupta had personally told him about the bribes during a 2011 meeting, also attended by Magashule and Duduzane Zuma, at which Dukwana himself, then MEC for Economic Development, had been offered a bribe in exchange for approving a multimillion-rand Gupta-linked contract. Magashule denied Dukwana's allegations, as did Duduzane Zuma. Dukwana said that he believed that Magashule had sacked him as an MEC in 2012 due to his refusal to cooperate with the Guptas' proposal, as well as because he intended to challenge Magashule for the ANC chairmanship.

==== Return as MEC ====
On 28 September 2021, Dukwana was sworn in again as a Member of the Free State Provincial Legislature; News24 reported that he was expected to be in line for appointment as an MEC under Premier Ntombela. On 1 October 2021, Ntombela announced a cabinet reshuffle in which Dukwana was appointed MEC for Cooperative Governance and Traditional Affairs.

==== Election to ANC chair ====
In the Free State ANC, Magashule was succeeded as Provincial Chairperson by his ally Sam Mashinini. However, in May 2021, the ANC's National Executive Committee – by then under the leadership of Zuma's successor, Cyril Ramaphosa – disbanded Mashinini's provincial leadership corps and appointed an interim task team to take its place until fresh leadership elections could be held. Dukwana was appointed to lead the provincial party as convenor of the interim committee. Dukwana, unlike Magashule and Mashinini, was viewed as an ally of incumbent ANC President Cyril Ramaphosa. In his new position, Dukwana faced hostile opposition from pro-Zuma and pro-Magashule groups in the provincial party.

By mid-2022, Dukwana, along with Thabo Manyoni, was viewed as a frontrunner for election as ANC Provincial Chairperson at the next party conference. Dukwana's candidature was endorsed by the provincial African National Congress Women's League Task Team. At the ANC's provincial elective conference held in January 2023 at the Imvelo Safari Lodge in Bloemfontein, he was the only candidate to have received enough nominations from the 242 qualified branches in the province to contest the position. Manyoni, who was expected to also contest the position, withdrew in favour of premier Sisi Ntombela after last-minute negotiations resulted in an agreement that Ntombela was best suited to defeat Dukwana. Dukwana ended up defeating Ntombela in a vote that went 346 votes for Dukwana and 306 for Ntombela. Candidates on Dukwana's slate also made a clean sweep of the Top 5 leadership positions contested at the conference.

== Premier of the Free State: 2023–2024 ==
On 5 February 2023, the Provincial Executive Committee (PEC) took the decision to recall Ntombela, who was not re-elected to the PEC, as premier of the Free State. The PEC then sent the names of three party members, including Dukwana, to the party's national structures to select a successor. On 21 February, Ntombela announced her resignation as ANC secretary-general Fikile Mbalula announced that the party's "Top 7" leadership officials had selected Dukwana to take over as premier. He was elected premier on 24 February. After the 2024 general election, he was succeeded as premier by Maqueen Letsoha-Mathae.

== Speaker of the Legislature ==
On 27 June 2024, Dukwana was elected as the speaker of the Free State Provincial Legislature.
