= Ace Magashule =

South African politician and activist (born 1959)

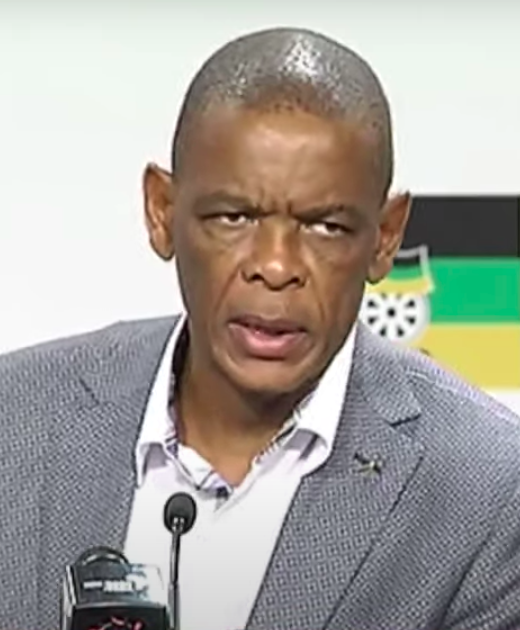
- Magashule in July 2019

16th Secretary-General of the African National Congress
- In office 18 December 2017 – 19 December 2022
- President: Cyril Ramaphosa
- Preceded by: Gwede Mantashe
- Succeeded by: Fikile Mbalula

5th Premier of the Free State
- In office 6 May 2009 – 27 March 2018
- Preceded by: Beatrice Marshoff
- Succeeded by: Sisi Ntombela

Provincial Chairperson of the African National Congress in Free State
- In office May 1998 – December 2017
- Deputy: Casca Mokitlane; Pat Matosa; Thabo Manyoni; Paseka Nompondo
- Preceded by: Zingile Dingani
- Succeeded by: Sam Mashinini

Deputy Provincial Chairperson of the African National Congress in Free State
- In office April 1994 – 1997
- Chairperson: Pat Matosa
- Preceded by: Position established
- Succeeded by: Ben Kotsoane

Member of the Free State Provincial Legislature
- In office April 2004 – March 2018
- In office 1994–1997

Personal details
- Born: Elias Sekgobelo Magashule; 3 November 1959 (age 66) Tumahole, South Africa
- Party: African Congress for Transformation
- Other political affiliations: African National Congress (until June 2023)
- Children: Tshepiso Magashule
- Education: University of Fort Hare (BA)
- Occupation: Politician; teacher; activist
- Nickname: Ace Magashule

Elias Sekgobelo "Ace" Magashule (born 3 November 1959) is a South African politician and former anti-apartheid activist who served as the Secretary General of the African National Congress (ANC), South Africa's governing party, between December 2017 and his suspension on 3 May 2021. He served as the Premier of the Free State, one of South Africa's nine provinces, from 2009 until 2018, and was known to be influential in the ANC of his home province.

An outspoken ally of former president Jacob Zuma, Magashule has been accused of various corrupt activities. He was arrested in November 2020 and awaits trial on charges relating to corruption under a government contract awarded while he was Premier. He was expelled from the ANC in June 2023 after the party's National Disciplinary Committee had found that he had brought the party into disrepute.

== Early life ==
Magashule attended Tumahole Primary School (now Lembede Primary) and Phehellang Secondary School in his hometown of Tumahole, Parys. He gained his nickname, "Ace," on the school soccer field. He received his Bachelor of Arts degree from Fort Hare University, and after graduating taught at Moqhaka High School in Sebokeng and later at Phehellang, his own former school.

In his youth, Magashule was a member of the Congress of South African Students and the Tumahole Youth Congress. In 1982, while a student at the Fort Hare, he was arrested following a protest against a visit by Ciskei Prime Minister Lennox Sebe, and convicted of public violence. His official ANC biography claims that he was charged with high treason, but this is contradicted by court records. In the 1980s, he played a role in the United Democratic Front (UDF) in the Northern Free State, and participated in organising rent boycotts in Tumahole. He was detained for his UDF activities in 1985.

He went into exile in 1989 and returned in 1991 after the ANC and other anti-apartheid groups were unbanned. He became the chairperson of the ANC's branch in the Northern Free State.

== Post-apartheid political career ==
=== Free State Legislature: 1994–1997 ===
In the 1994 general election, Magashule was elected to an ANC seat in the Free State Provincial Legislature. He was also appointed to the Free State Executive Council, where he served as Member of the Executive Council (MEC) for Economic Affairs between 1994 and 1996. Later in 1994, he was elected as Deputy Provincial Chairperson of the ANC's newly unified Free State provincial branch, deputising Pat Matosa.

In mid-1996, Free State Premier Terror Lekota announced a reshuffle in which Magashule was moved to a new and less senior government office as MEC for Transport. Lekota said that his decision was informed by "rumours about misconduct" in the Department of Economic Affairs and by his belief that Magashule was "better-suited" to the on-the-ground work of the transport portfolio. In November 1996, amid increasing factional hostilities in the Free State ANC, the ANC's national leadership announced that Magashule and Matosa would leave the provincial legislature and be transferred to ANC seats in the National Assembly, the lower house of the South African Parliament.

=== National Assembly: 1997–2004 ===
Magashule took up his seat in the National Assembly in August 1997 and served there until the 2004 general election. During his tenure, he was elected Provincial Chairperson of the ANC's Free State branch at a party elective conference in 1998.

=== Return to the Free State: 2004–2009 ===
In the 2004 election, Magashule was returned to the Free State Provincial Legislature, ranked first on the ANC's provincial party list. In the aftermath of the election, newly elected Premier Beatrice Marshoff appointed him as MEC for Agriculture. He remained in that portfolio until Marshoff sacked him in April 2005. Subsequently he served as an ordinary Member of the Provincial Legislature until August 2007, when, in another reshuffle, he returned to the Executive Council as MEC for Sports, Arts and Culture. He moved to the Public Safety and Security portfolio in October 2008.

During this period, in December 2007, Magashule was directly elected to the ANC's National Executive Committee, after having served as an ex officio member of the committee for a decade in his capacity as a provincial chairperson.

=== Premier of the Free State: 2009–2018 ===
On 6 May 2009, pursuant to that year's general election, Magashule was indirectly elected to succeed Marshoff as Premier of the Free State. As Premier, he initiated Operation Hlasela, a campaign to fight poverty in the Free State, and established a bursary fund for tertiary students in the Premier's office.

Also while Premier, Magashule retained his party position as ANC Provincial Chairperson, and he ultimately became the ANC's longest-serving Provincial Chairperson. During his leadership of the branch, the results of its elective conference were successfully challenged twice in court, once in 2012 and once in 2017, and he has been accused of rigging votes. During his chairmanship, he was part of what was known as the "Premier League," an unofficial lobbying group within the ANC which was influential during the presidency of Jacob Zuma, to whom it was aligned, and which consisted of Magashule, Supra Mahumapelo of the North West, and DD Mabuza of Mpumalanga.

In December 2017, during the ANC's 54th National Conference, he was elected to the full-time party position of ANC Secretary General, pursuant to a recount – his opponents had disputed the result and demanded that 68 "missing" ballots be accounted for. He had run on the slate of the losing presidential candidate, Nkosazana Dlamini-Zuma, and was backed by the Premier League.

== Arrest and criminal charges ==
On 10 November 2020, the Hawks issued a warrant for Magashule's arrest on 21 charges of corruption, theft, fraud and money laundering. The charges relate to a R255-million contract which the Free State Department of Human Settlements awarded to Blackhead Consulting in 2014, while Magashule was Premier, for the auditing and removal of asbestos from homes in the province. The National Prosecuting Authority claims that, following receipt of the contract, Magashule's personal assistant asked a Blackhead subsidiary to make various payments to third parties, either at Magashule's instruction or with his knowledge. These payments included R50,000 for the school fees of the child of an alleged ally of the Gupta family, Refiloe Mokoena, previously of the South African Revenue Service. The trial of Magashule and the fifteen co-accused has been postponed several times due to applications brought by Magashule, who claims that the charges are politically motivated.

=== ANC suspension ===
In early May 2021, the ANC National Working Committee suspended Magashule from the position of ANC Secretary General until the conclusion of the court proceedings. He had been given 30 days to voluntarily "step aside" from his party leadership positions, under the ANC's new step-aside rule. He refused to accept his suspension and in turn sought to suspend Cyril Ramaphosa, the ANC and national President. On 13 September 2021, the Gauteng High Court dismissed Magashule's application to appeal his suspension.

On 12 June 2023, ANC spokesperson Mahlengi Bhengu-Motsiri announced that Magashule had been expelled from the party after he had missed the deadline of seven days to oppose the National Disciplinary Committee's disciplinary findings against him.

== Other corruption allegations ==
Magashule has been the subject of many journalistic investigations alleging his corrupt activities, and has been accused of participating in state capture during the Zuma presidency. In 2011 Magashule and Mohloua Seoe were linked to a government property deal that was awarded to a company of which both were once co-directors. In November 2017 the winner of a tender from the provincial government Magashule headed alleged that Magashule had personally encouraged him to act as a front for the contract.

In January 2018, the Hawks raided Magashule's offices in connection with the Vrede Dairy Project, calling it a "scheme designed to defraud and steal monies" from the Free State Department of Agriculture.

=== Children ===
One of his sons, Tshepiso "Gift" Magashule, was employed as a consultant by the Gupta family since November 2010, shortly after Duduzane Zuma was brought under their influence. In 2011 Gift joined the Gupta brothers on a three-week holiday to New York and Venice, and he was later appointed a director in a Gupta company, earning R90,000 a month. Ace Magashule alleged that Gift's link to the Guptas was no secret. In 2015 the Guptas treated Gift and his brother Thato to an eight-day stay in the Oberoi Hotel, Dubai.

In 2015 a busy Shell fuel station in Phuthaditjhaba, owned by the Free State Development Corporation (FDC), was acquired by Ace's 27-year-old daughter Thoko Alice Malembe. As the deal involved an R11.5 million upfront rental fee from Shell, and a purchase price of R2.9 million, reportedly below its market value, it resulted in a windfall of some R8.9 million for Malembe's MMAT trust. Magashule denied any involvement, despite a security video of 18 December 2014 which confirmed his exploratory visit to the fuel station, in the company of two FDC board members, and apparently, Malembe. The fuel station's 60 employees had to be retrenched by their former employer, when it lost its case against the FDC. After she was reunited with her father in 2011, Malembe registered Botlokwa Holdings in 2013, which managed to secure a series of government tenders and property deals from the Free State provincial government. Malembe's trust or company also acquired a Botshabelo fuel station from the FDC for R2.88 million (or R4 million according to the FDC), despite an offer of R5.5 million from another investor.

=== Associates ===
Ace Magashule is a long-time friend of Hantsi Matseke, chairperson of the FDC. Matseke owns Maono Construction which has been awarded contracts worth R515 million by government departments and municipalities in the Free State. Magashule has denied influencing any of these. Maono Construction has however subcontracted work to Malembe's Botlokwa Holdings.

== African Congress for Transformation ==
In August 2023, Magashule founded a new political party, the African Congress for Transformation.

== See also ==
- Gangster State – 2019 book about Magashule

Political offices
Preceded by Beatrice Marshoff	Premier of the Free State; 6 May 2009 – 27 March 2018	Succeeded by Sisi Ntombela
