= Free State Provincial Legislature =

Legislature of the Free State Province, South Africa

Free State Provincial Legislature Vrystaatse Provinsiale Wetgewer (Afrikaans) Kopano ea Molao ea Lekhotla la Free State (Sotho)
- 7th Legislature

Type
- Type: Unicameral

Leadership
- Speaker: Mxolisi Dukwana, ANC since 27 June 2024
- Deputy Speaker: Nolitha Ndungane, ANC since 27 June 2024
- Premier: Maqueen Letsoha-Mathae, ANC since 14 June 2024
- Leader of the Opposition: Roy Jankielsohn, DA since 21 May 2014

Structure
- Seats: 30
- Political groups: Government (16): ANC (16); Official Opposition (7): DA (7); Other parties (7): EFF (4); FF+ (1); MK (1); ACT (1)

Elections
- Voting system: Party-list proportional representation
- Last election: 29 May 2024

Meeting place
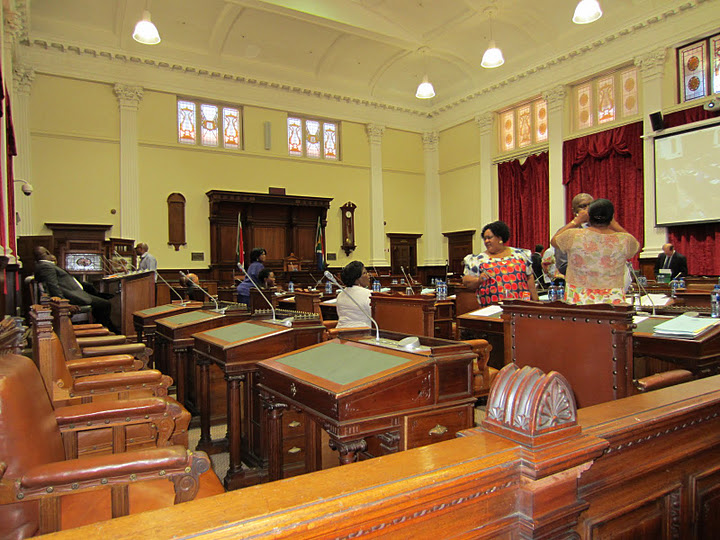
- Legislative Chamber, Vierde Raadsaal, Bloemfontein

Website
- Free State Legislature

The Free State Provincial Legislature is the primary legislative body of the South African province of Free State. It is unicameral in its composition and elects the Premier of the Free State, who in turn selects the members of the Executive Council of the Free State.

== Powers ==
The Free State Provincial Legislature chooses the Premier of the Free State, the head of the Free State's provincial executive. The legislature can force the Premier to resign by passing a motion of no confidence. Although the Executive Council is chosen by the Premier, the legislature may pass a motion of no confidence to force the Premier to change the composition of the Council. The legislature also appoints Free State's delegates to the National Council of Provinces, allocating delegates to parties in proportion to the number of seats each party holds in the legislature.

The legislature has the power to pass legislation in numerous fields specified in the national constitution, including include health, education (except universities), agriculture, housing, environmental protection, and development planning. In some fields, legislative power is shared with the national parliament, while in other fields it is reserved to the Free State alone.

The legislature oversees the administration of the Free State provincial government, and the Premier and the members of the Executive Council are required to report to the legislature on the performance of their responsibilities. The legislature also manages the finances of the provincial government by way of the appropriation bills which determine the Free State's provincial budget.

== Election ==
The provincial legislature consists of 30 members, who are elected through a system of party-list proportional representation with closed lists. The most recent election was held on 29 May 2024. The following table summarises the results.

Party	Votes	Vote %	Seats
ANC	429,241	51.87	16
DA	181,062	21.88	7
EFF	111,850	13.52	4
VF+	24,933	3.01	1
MK	15,985	1.93	1
ACT	15,120	1.83	1
Other parties	49,321	5.96	0
Total	827,512	100.0	30

The following table shows the composition of the provincial parliament after past elections. The African National Congress has held a majority in the legislature since 1994, while the Democratic Alliance has been the official opposition since 2014, when it displaced the Congress of the People.

Party	1994	1999	2004	2009	2014	2019	2024
African Christian Democratic Party	0	0	1	0	0	0	0
African Congress for Transformation	—	—	—	—	—	—	1
African National Congress	24	25	25	22	22	19	16
Congress of the People	—	—	—	4	0	0	0
Democratic Alliance / Democratic Party	0	2	3	3	5	6	7
Economic Freedom Fighters	—	—	—	—	2	4	4
Freedom Front Plus / Freedom Front	2	1	1	1	1	1	1
New National Party / National Party	4	2	0	—	—	—	—
UMkhonto we Sizwe	—	—	—	—	—	—	1
Total	30						

== Officers ==
The following people have served as Speaker of the Free State Provincial Legislature.

Name	Term start	Term end	Party
Motlalepula Chabaku	1994	1998	ANC
Joel Mafereka	1998	2001	ANC
Jani Mohapi	2001	2002	ANC
Mxolisi Dukwana	2002	2008	ANC
Ouma Tsopo	2013	2014	ANC
Sisi Mabe	2014	2014	ANC
Mamiki Qabathe	2015	2019	ANC
Zanele Sifuba	2019	2024	ANC
Mxolisi Dukwana	2024	Incumbent	ANC

== Members ==
- Members of the 7th Free State Provincial Legislature (2024–present)
- Members of the 6th Free State Provincial Legislature (2019–2024)
- Members of the 5th Free State Provincial Legislature (2014–2019)
- Members of the 4th Free State Provincial Legislature (2009–2014)
- Members of the 3rd Free State Provincial Legislature (2004–2009)
- Members of the 2nd Free State Provincial Legislature (1999–2004)
