= National Executive Committee of the African National Congress =

National leadership of the African National Congress

Type
- Type: Executive organ of the African National Congress

Leadership
- President: Cyril Ramaphosa
- Deputy President: Paul Mashatile
- Chairperson: Gwede Mantashe
- Secretary-General: Fikile Mbalula
- 1st Deputy Secretary-General: Nomvula Mokonyane
- 2nd Deputy Secretary-General: Maropene Ramokgopa
- Treasurer-General: Gwen Ramokgopa

Structure
- Seats: 87
- Committees: National Working Committee; National List Committee; Revolutionary Council (1969–83); Politico-Military Council (1983–90)
- Length of term: 5 years

Elections
- Last election: 55th National Conference

Website
- anc1912.org.za/nec

The National Executive Committee (NEC) of the African National Congress (ANC) is the political party's highest decision-making body in between its party conferences. It serves as the primary executive organ responsible for leading and governing the ANC, directing the party's policies, strategies, and overall operations. The NEC is elected every five years at the ANC's National Conference and consists of 87 members, including the party's top officials, such as the president of the ANC, deputy president, chairperson, secretary-general, two deputy secretaries-general, and treasurer-general (known as the "Top Seven").

It also elects a National Working Committee (NWC), which takes on the day-to-day operational responsibilities of the party.

== Composition ==
Members of the NEC must have been paid-up members of the ANC for at least five years prior to nomination, and at least half must be women. The NEC consists of:

- The "Top Seven" (president, deputy president, national chairperson, secretary-general, two deputy secretaries-general, and treasurer-general);
- Eighty further members;
- Ex officio members, comprising two leaders from each of the ANC Women's League, ANC Youth League, ANC Veterans' League, and nine ANC Provincial Executive Committees; and
- Up to five additional co-opted members.

The size of the elected NEC was increased to 56 members (including the Top Six) at the 48th National Conference in 1991, and then to 66 members (including the Top Six) at the 49th National Conference in 1994 – during apartheid, the NEC had been smaller and of a less consistent size, sometimes dropping below ten members. It was enlarged again, to 86 members, at the 52nd National Conference in 2007, which also introduced the gender parity requirement, and further enlarged again to its current size of 87 members at the 55th National Conference with the introduction of a 2nd Deputy Secretary-General. Another significant change has been the extension of the term of the NEC from three years to five years, following the resolution of the 1997 50th National Conference to reduce the frequency of national conferences to twice a decade.

== Election process ==
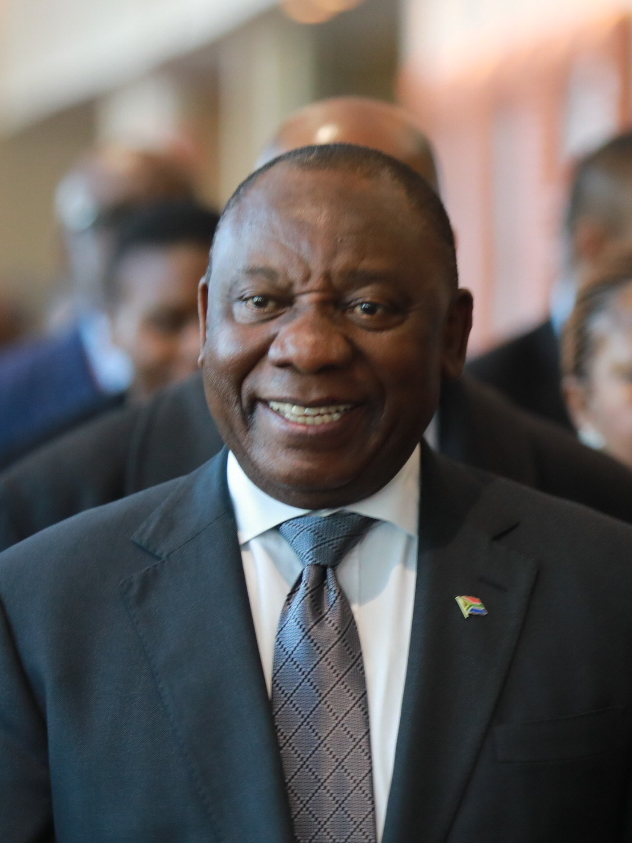
President Cyril Ramaphosa has been a member of the National Executive Committee for 30 years

Until 1985, members of the NEC were not appointed by election, but rather were appointed and seconded on a much more ad hoc basis, at the discretion of the leadership. In recent years, however, members of the NEC are elected by secret ballot at the ANC's national conference under clear rules. The Top Seven is elected separately, usually before the election of the rest of the NEC.

=== Nominations ===
Nominations for the NEC and Top Seven emanate from the local branch level. In the run-up to a National Conference, every ANC branch in good standing holds a branch nomination meeting, at which, provided it is quorate, it may nominate one individual for each of the "Top Seven" leadership positions and up to 20 individuals for the other 80 NEC positions. Nominees must receive the support of 50% + 1 members present at the meeting, and at least half of the NEC nominees must be women – if necessary, the names of the lowest ranked male candidates must be removed until gender parity is achieved. The official branch nominations are consolidated at a provincial general council meeting, and the 250 nominees who received the most nominations become the provincial nominees for the NEC. Gender parity remains a condition at the provincial level, and women nominees are upgraded on the list if necessary to meet it. The individuals who received the most nominations for the Top Seven positions become the provincial nominees for those positions.

At the National Conference, the lists of provincial nominees are consolidated, along with the lists of nominees from the leagues, which hold nomination conferences in the same way as the provinces. The availability of nominees to stand in the elections is confirmed, and all voting delegates are also allowed to propose additional nominations from the floor at the conference, although such proposals only succeed if 25% of delegates support them.

=== Campaigning ===
Although since 1994 the election of the NEC has often been preceded by considerable political manoeuvring, the ANC has a long history of valuing democratic centralism and collective leadership, and overt campaigning for internal leadership positions is frowned upon. This attitude is encapsulated, and promoted, in a discussion paper adopted by the National Working Committee in 2001 and reviewed in 2021, titled Through the Eye of a Needle?: Choosing the Best Cadres to Lead Transformation. The paper warns that "electoral processes" should not "tear the movement apart," and that

it is a matter of profound cultural practice within the ANC that individuals do not promote or canvass for themselves. Historically, this has justifiably been frowned upon as being in bad revolutionary taste.

== Subcommittees in exile ==
=== Revolutionary Council ===
In 1969, while based primarily in Tanzania, the NEC established the Revolutionary Council, which focused on both political and military aspects of the internal anti-apartheid struggle. Notably, the Revolutionary Council included several leaders of the ANC's military wing, Umkhonto we Sizwe (MK) – this in a period in which the NEC was limited to blacks ("Africans") only, while MK leadership (and thus the council) included several whites, Indians, and coloureds, especially from the Communist Party. Although it was located under the NEC, the council had considerable power. From around 1976, it was responsible for two subordinate structures: the Internal Political Reconstruction Committee, focused on the South African political underground and internal propaganda, and MK Central Operations HQ, focused on internal armed struggle.

The Revolutionary Council was chaired by ANC president Oliver Tambo throughout its lifespan, and other members included (with approximate dates):

- Yusuf Dadoo (1969–1983)
- Peter Dlamini (1976–1983)
- Steve Dlamini (1976–1983)
- John Gaetsewe (1969–1976)
- Joe Gqabi (1977–1983)
- Chris Hani (1976–1983)
- Joe Jele (1976–1983)
- Moses Kotane (1969–1976)
- Moses Mabhida (secretary 1970–1983)
- Mac Maharaj (1977–1983)
- Simon Makana (1969–1983)
- Johnny Makathini (1976–1983)
- Cassius Make (1977–1983)
- Tennyson Makiwane (1969–1976)
- Robert Manci (1976–1983)
- J. B. Marks (1969–1972)
- Andrew Masondo (1969–1983)
- Jacob Masondo (1969–1983)
- Joe Matthews (secretary 1969–1970)
- Thabo Mbeki (1969–1983)
- Joe Modise (1969–1983)
- Ruth Mompati (1969–1976)
- Florence Moposho (1976–1983)
- John Motshabi (1969–1983)
- John Nkadimeng (1977–1983)
- Duma Nokwe (1969–1978)
- Mzwai Piliso (1969–1983)
- Godfrey Pule (1977–1983)
- Robert Resha (1969–1976)
- Jackie Sedibe (1969–1976)
- Reggie September (1969–1976)
- Gertrude Shope (1976–1983)
- Sizakele Sigxashe (1977–1983)
- Joe Slovo (1969–1983)
- Bogart Soze (1976–1983)
- Lennox Tshali (1976–1983)
- Peter Tshikare (1977–1983)
- Jacob Zuma (1977–1983)

From around 1976, there was also a Revolutionary Council structure in London, chaired by Yusuf Dadoo and including Jack Hodgson, Ronnie Kasrils, Aziz Pahad, Reg September, and Solly Smith.

=== Politico-Military Council ===
In 1983, the Revolutionary Council was replaced by the Politico-Military Council (PMC), which became "the executive arm of the NEC in relation to all matters pertaining to the conduct of the political and military struggle inside South Africa." This followed a meeting of all commanders and commissars in Luanda, at which concerns included the intensification of internal struggle and co-ordination between the military and political aspects of struggle, with greater political control envisaged over MK activities and strategy. The full PMC met monthly, while its executive committee or "secretariat" met weekly.

The 1983 restructuring also led to the establishment of other bodies under the NEC. At least two of these, the Political HQ (replaced by the expanded Internal Political Committee in 1987) and the Military HQ, fell under the ambit of the PMC and were represented in the PMC. ANC intelligence structures were also represented, and the PMC was responsible for coordinating the activities of these three wings. The PMC, like many other ANC structures, was dissolved before 1991 during the transition to democracy in South Africa, which brought the unbanning and return from exile of the ANC, as well as the de-escalation of MK activities.

Like the Revolutionary Council, the PMC was chaired by Tambo. Members included:

- Chris Hani (1983–1990)
- Joe Jele (1983–1990)
- Ronnie Kasrils (1985–1990)
- Moses Mabhida (1983–1987)
- Mac Maharaj (1983–1990)
- Cassius Make (1983–1987)
- Andrew Masondo (1983–1985)
- Joe Modise (1983–1990)
- Ruth Mompati (1983–1990)
- John Motshabi (1983–1990)
- Joel Netshitenzhe (1985–1990)
- Joe Nhlanhla (1983–1990)
- John Nkadimeng (1983–1987)
- Thomas Nkobi (1983–1985)
- Alfred Nzo (1983–1985)
- Mzwai Piliso (1983–1987)
- Reg September (1983–1985)
- Sizakele Sigxashe (1983–1990)
- Joe Slovo (1983–1990)
- Steve Tshwete (1985–1990)
- Jacob Zuma (1983–1990)

The London-based PMC was led by Aziz Pahad and Wally Serote.

== Current subcommittees ==
=== National Working Committee ===
Soon after each national conference, the newly constituted NEC appoints – at least in recent years, by election – a smaller National Working Committee (NWC), which implements NEC decisions and oversees the daily business of the ANC, including in the provincial branches and in Parliament. Some members are appointed full-time and have specific party responsibilities, while others hold other political offices. The NWC consists of:

- The Top Seven;
- Additional members, not exceeding one-quarter of the directly elected NEC (around twenty members); and
- Three ex officio members, comprising one representative appointed by each of the ANC Women's League, ANC Youth League, and ANC Veterans' League.

As in other ANC structures, at least half of the members must be women. Other ANC members may also be invited to attend or participate as non-voting members.

==== Current members ====
The current NWC was elected on 29 January 2023, following the NEC's first meeting after the 55th National Conference. It will serve until December 2027. In addition to the Top Seven, the members are:

- Mmamoloko Kubayi
- Barbara Creecy
- Enoch Godongwana
- Tina Joemat-Pettersson
- Zizi Kodwa
- Ronald Lamola
- David Mahlobo
- Pemmy Majodina
- Thandi Modise
- Sibongile Besani
- Stella Ndabeni-Abrahams
- Mdumiseni Ntuli
- Angie Motshekga
- Senzo Mchunu
- Mondli Gungubele
- Mduduzi Manana
- Peggy Nkonyeni
- Thembi Nkadimeng
- Nonceba Mhlauli
- Khumbudzo Ntshavheni

=== National List Committee ===
The National List Committee reports to, and is appointed annually by, the NEC. It is responsible for the selection of ANC candidates for the national Parliament, and it also oversees and regulates the provincial selection processes. The committee was established following amendments to the ANC constitution by the 50th National Conference in 1997, prior to which the parliamentary selection process had been less centralised.

=== Other subcommittees ===
The NEC is responsible for several other subcommittees, which are primarily staffed by NEC members and whose composition is agreed by the NEC early in its term. Important is the national Deployment Committee (chaired by Deputy President David Mabuza), which was established in 1998 to implement resolutions of the 50th National Conference which endorsed a policy of ANC cadre deployment in the public service and "key centres of power." Other NEC subcommittees include the Economic Transformation Committee (chaired by Finance Minister Enoch Godongwana), the Elections Committee (chaired by Fikile Mbalula), a National Disciplinary Committee of Appeal (chaired by Nomvula Mokonyane), and over a dozen others.

== Membership in exile ==
=== National Executive Committee 1963–1969 ===
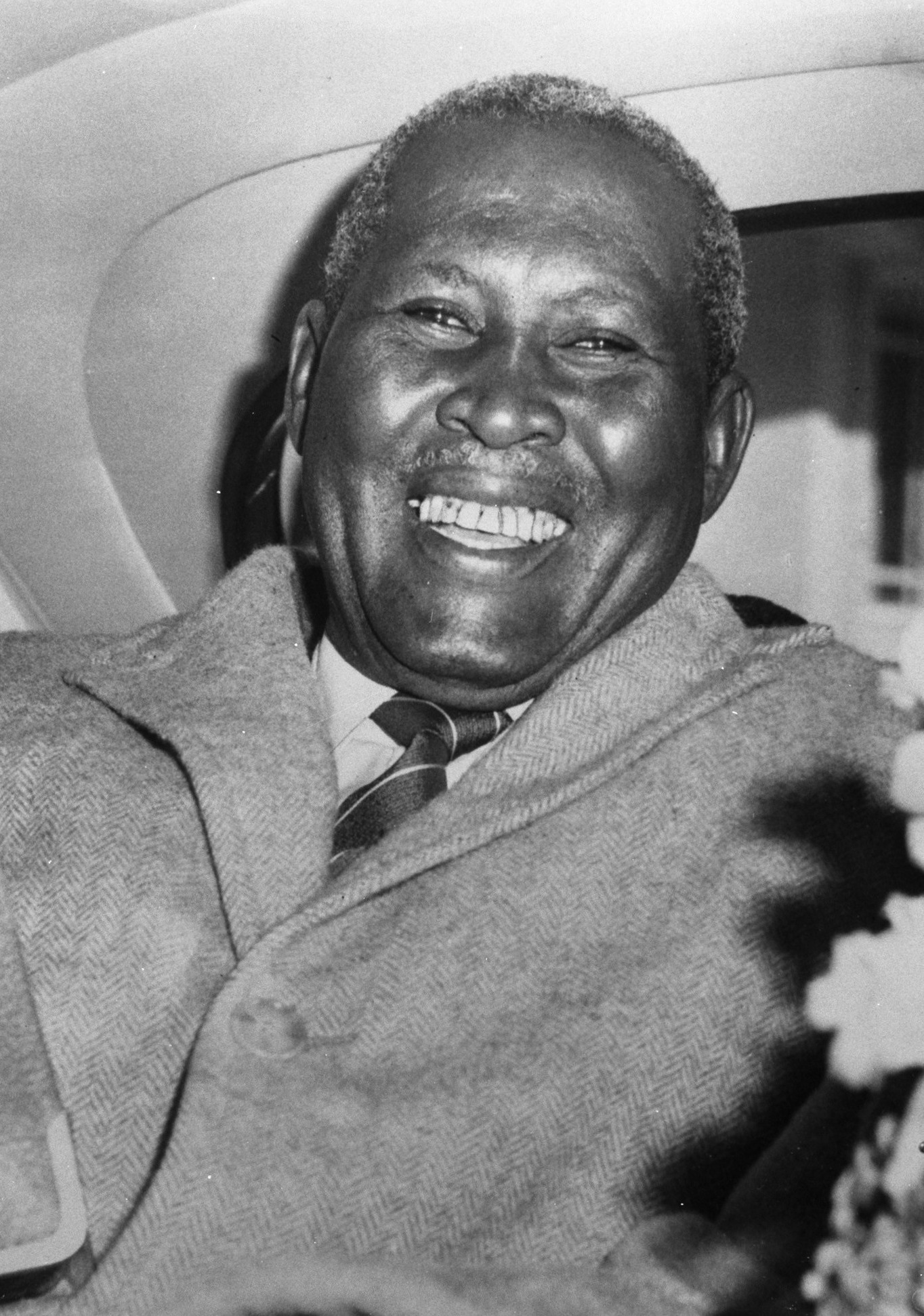
Albert Luthuli, ANC president from 1952 until his death in 1967

In 1960, the ANC was banned in South Africa, and much of its leadership had been arrested, especially during the Treason Trial and later the Rivonia Trial. The ANC therefore set about re-establishing command structures in exile, from a new base in Tanzania.

Leadership

- President: Albert Luthuli (died 1967), then Oliver Tambo (acting)
- Deputy President: Oliver Tambo
- Secretary-General: Duma Nokwe
- Treasurer-General: Moses Kotane

Members

- Jimmy Hadebe
- Moses Mabhida
- Johnny Makathini
- Ambrose Makiwane
- Tennyson Makiwane
- J. B. Marks
- Joe Matthews
- Joe Modise
- Themba Mqota
- Mendi Msimang
- Thomas Nkobi
- Alfred Nzo
- Mzwai Piliso
- Robert Resha
- Mark Shope
- Dan Tloome

=== National Executive Committee 1969–1976 ===
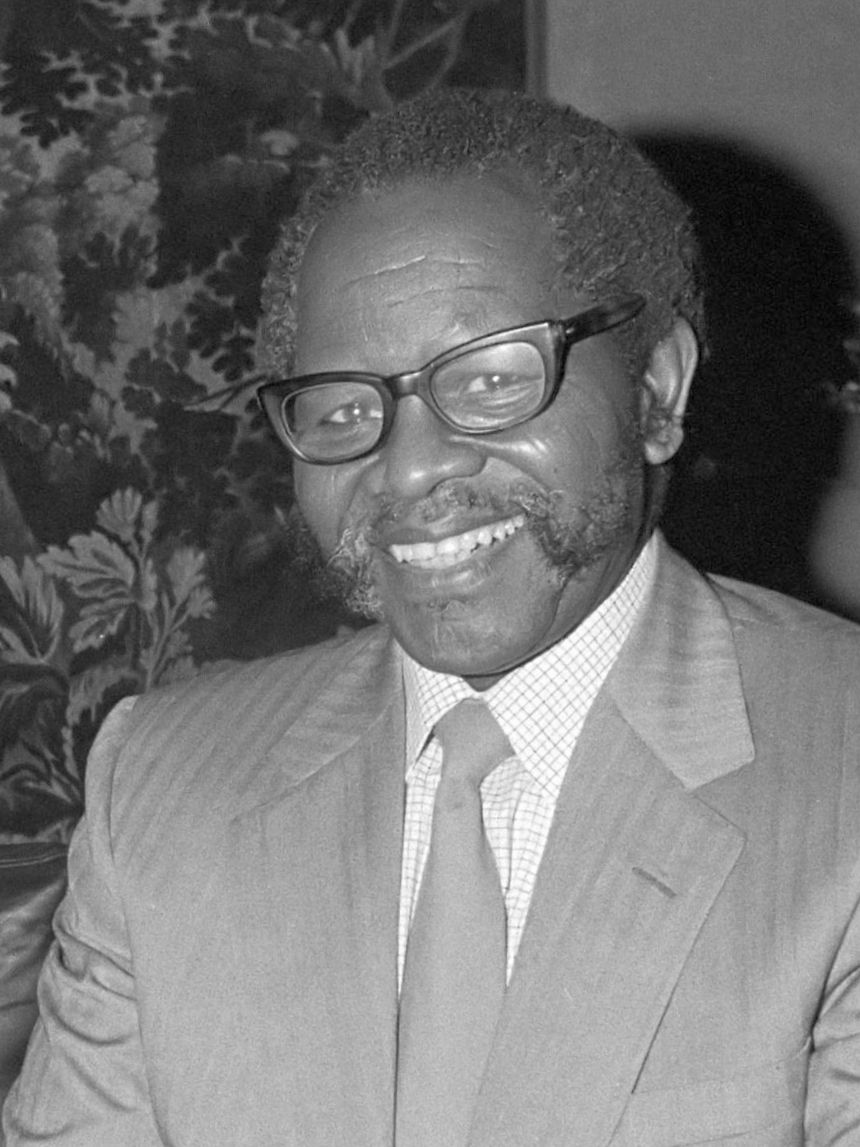
Oliver Tambo, ANC president-in-exile from 1967 until 1991

The NEC was appointed during the 1969 conference in Morogoro, Tanzania, the ANC's first in exile. The NEC was not elected by the party's membership and, as indicated below, it co-opted additional members after 1969 "as the leadership saw fit."

Leadership

- President: Oliver Tambo (acting)
- Secretary-General: Duma Nokwe (until 1969), then Alfred Nzo
- Treasurer-General: Moses Kotane (until 1973), then Thomas Nkobi

Members

- John Gaetsewe (co-opted)
- Joe Gqabi (co-opted)
- Jimmy Hadebe
- Chris Hani (co-opted)
- Joe Jele (co-opted)
- Moses Mabhida
- Simon Makana (co-opted)
- Johnny Makathini
- Henry Makgothi (co-opted)
- Ambrose Makiwane (expelled 1972)
- Tennyson Makiwane (expelled 1972)
- Robert Manci (co-opted)
- J. B. Marks
- Andrew Masondo (co-opted)
- Joe Matthews
- Thabo Mbeki (co-opted)
- Joe Modise
- Florence Moposho (co-opted)
- John Motshabi
- Themba Mqota (expelled 1972)
- John Nkadimeng (co-opted)
- Mzwai Piliso
- Robert Resha
- Tom Sebina
- Dan Tloome
- Jacob Zuma (co-opted)

=== National Executive Committee 1976–1985 ===
The NEC continued to be appointed without elections over this period, and its composition changed very little.

Leadership

- President: Oliver Tambo (acting)
- Secretary-General: Alfred Nzo
- Treasurer-General: Thomas Nkobi
- Administrative Secretary: Joe Nhlanhla (from 1978)

Members

- Steve Dlamini
- Joe Gqabi
- Chris Hani (from 1980)
- Joe Jele
- Moses Mabhida
- Simon Makana
- Johnny Makathini
- Robert Manci
- Andrew Masondo
- Thabo Mbeki
- Joe Modise
- Florence Moposho
- John Motshabi
- John Nkadimeng
- Duma Nokwe (died 1978)
- Mzwai Piliso
- Gertrude Shope
- Jacob Zuma

=== National Executive Committee 1985–1991 ===
The NEC was elected in May 1985 in Kabwe, Zambia, and was the ANC's first fully elected NEC. In 1990, the ANC was unbanned and held a national consultative conference in Johannesburg – the first official meeting between exiles, underground members, and formerly imprisoned members – at which leaders who had not attended the Kabwe conference reaffirmed the composition of the NEC as elected at Kabwe.

Leadership

- President: Oliver Tambo
- Deputy President: Nelson Mandela
- Secretary-General: Alfred Nzo
- Treasurer-General: Thomas Nkobi

Members

- Chris Hani
- Joe Jele
- Pallo Jordan
- Ronnie Kasrils (from 1987)
- Hermanus Loots
- Moses Mabhida (died 1986)
- Mac Maharaj
- Simon Makana
- Johnny Makathini
- Cassius Make (died 1987)
- Henry Makgothi
- Robert Manci
- Thabo Mbeki
- Francis Meli
- Sindiso Mfenyana (from 1987)
- Joe Modise
- Ruth Mompati
- Tony Mongalo
- Florence Moposho
- John Motshabi
- Godfrey Ngwenya (from 1987)
- Joe Nhlanhla
- John Nkadimeng
- Aziz Pahad (from 1987)
- Jackie Sedibe (from 1987)
- Jackie Selebi
- Reggie September
- Gertrude Shope
- Sizakele Sigxashe
- Zola Skweyiya
- Joe Slovo
- Dan Tloome
- Steve Tshwete
- Jacob Zuma

== Membership after 1990 ==
=== National Executive Committee 1991–1994 ===
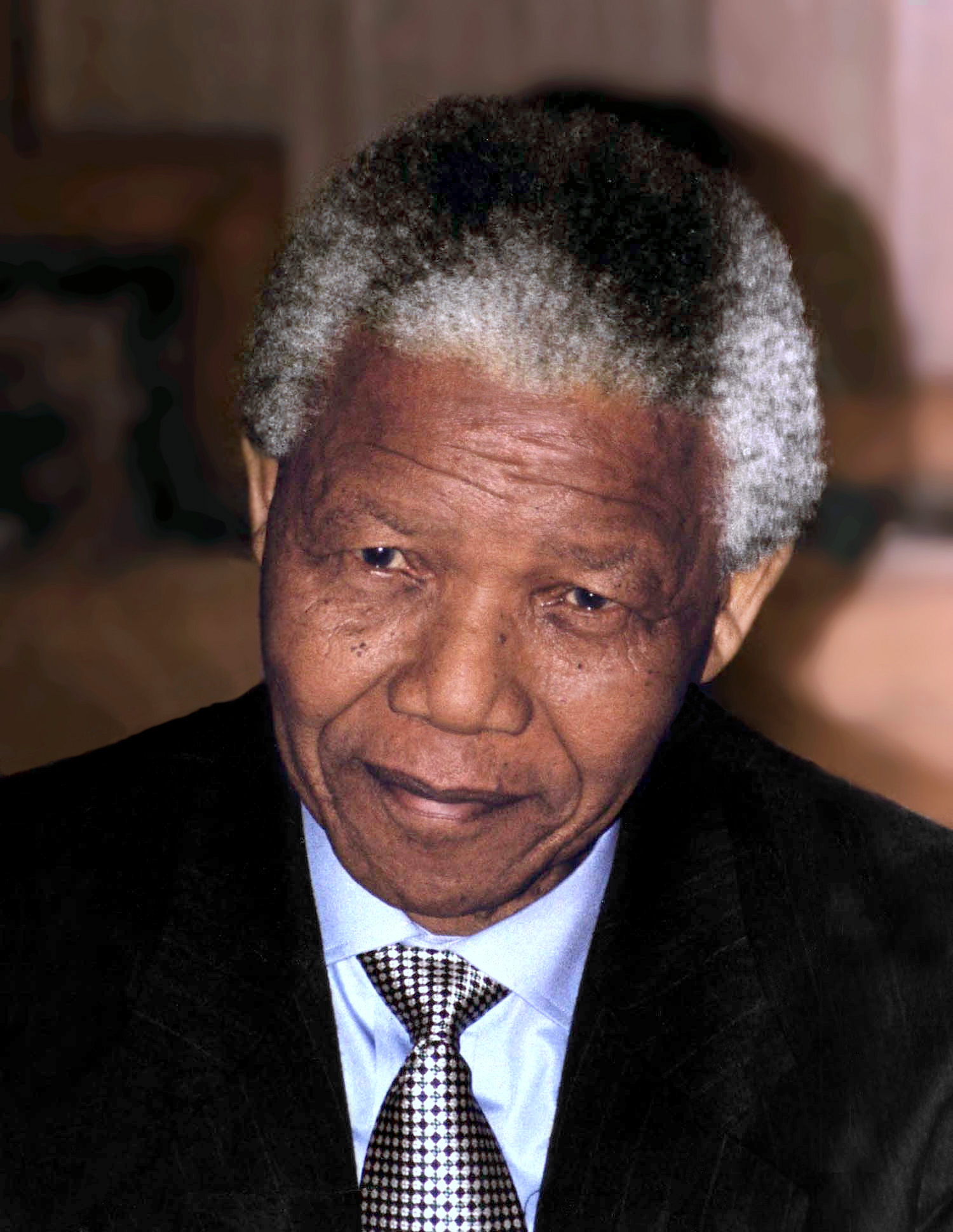
Nelson Mandela, ANC president from 1991 until 1997, first ANC president to serve in government

The NEC was elected at the ANC's 48th National Conference in Durban in July 1991. Nelson Mandela was elected ANC president, replacing Oliver Tambo, who had suffered a stroke in 1989 and stepped down after 24 years as president. As indicated below, the NEC voted to co-opt five additional members after 1991, in order to fill vacancies arising from deaths and resignations.

Leadership

- President: Nelson Mandela
- Deputy President: Walter Sisulu
- Chairperson: Oliver Tambo (died 1993), then Thabo Mbeki
- Secretary-General: Cyril Ramaphosa
- Deputy Secretary-General: Jacob Zuma
- Treasurer-General: Thomas Nkobi

Members

- Kader Asmal
- Thozamile Botha (resigned)
- Cheryl Carolus*
- Jeremy Cronin
- Ebrahim Ebrahim*
- Harry Gwala
- Chris Hani* (died 1993)
- Josiah Jele (co-opted)
- Pallo Jordan*
- Ronnie Kasrils*
- Ahmed Kathrada
- Mosiuoa Lekota*
- Saki Macozoma
- Penuell Maduna
- Mac Maharaj
- Rocky Malebane-Metsing
- Winnie Mandela
- Trevor Manuel*
- Gill Marcus
- Barbara Masekela*
- Govan Mbeki
- Thabo Mbeki*
- Raymond Mhlaba
- Wilton Mkwayi
- Andrew Mlangeni
- Joe Modise*
- Peter Mokaba
- Popo Molefe
- Ruth Mompati
- Valli Moosa*
- Elias Motsoaledi (died 1994)
- Mendi Msimang
- Sydney Mufamadi*
- Billy Nair
- Sister Bernard Ncube
- Joel Netshitenzhe*
- Joe Nhlanhla
- John Nkadimeng*
- Sankie Nkondo (co-opted)
- Charles Nqakula (co-opted)
- Siphiwe Nyanda (resigned)
- Alfred Nzo*
- Dullah Omar
- Aziz Pahad
- Albie Sachs (resigned)
- Reg September
- Gertrude Shope
- Albertina Sisulu
- Zola Skweyiya*
- Joe Slovo*
- Marion Sparg
- Arnold Stofile
- Raymond Suttner
- Steve Tshwete*
- Mcwayizeni Zulu
- Nkosazana Zuma (co-opted)

* Members of the National Working Committee

=== National Executive Committee 1994–1997 ===
The NEC was elected at the ANC's 49th National Conference in Bloemfontein in December 1994. Well represented are former Robben Island prisoners, as well as trade unionists and other former leaders of internal anti-apartheid structures, such as the United Democratic Front, who joined the ANC following its unbanning and return to South Africa. Four additional unelected members were coopted onto the NEC after 1994, to fill vacancies arising from resignations and deaths.

Leadership

- President: Nelson Mandela
- Deputy President: Thabo Mbeki
- Chairperson: Jacob Zuma
- Secretary-General: Cyril Ramaphosa (until 1996), then Cheryl Carolus (acting)
- Deputy Secretary-General: Cheryl Carolus
- Treasurer-General: Arnold Stofile

Additional members

- Kader Asmal
- Sibusiso Bengu
- Thozamile Botha (resigned)
- Jeremy Cronin
- Thoko Didiza (co-opted)
- Chris Dlamini (co-opted)
- Ebrahim Ismail Ebrahim
- Alec Erwin
- Frene Ginwala*
- John Gomomo (resigned)
- Harry Gwala (died 1995)
- Derek Hanekom
- Limpho Hani
- Bantu Holomisa (expelled 1996)
- Lulu Johnson
- Pallo Jordan*
- Ronnie Kasrils
- Ahmed Kathrada
- Baleka Kgositsile
- Mosiuoa Lekota
- Brigitte Mabandla (co-opted)
- Saki Macozoma*
- Penuell Maduna
- Mac Maharaj*
- Winnie Mandela
- Trevor Manuel
- Mavivi Manzini
- Nosiviwe Mapisa-Nqakula (co-opted)
- Gill Marcus*
- Moses Mayekiso
- Govan Mbeki
- Tito Mboweni*
- Raymond Mhlaba
- Wilton Mkwayi
- Joe Modise
- Thandi Modise
- Peter Mokaba
- Ruth Mompati
- Valli Moosa
- Linda Mti
- Thenjiwe Mtintso*
- Sydney Mufamadi*
- S'bu Ndebele
- Joel Netshitenzhe*
- Smuts Ngonyama
- Joe Nhlanhla
- Carl Niehaus
- Sankie Nkondo
- Charles Nqakula
- Blade Nzimande*
- Alfred Nzo
- Dullah Omar*
- Aziz Pahad
- Essop Pahad
- Jeff Radebe
- Sam Shilowa (resigned)
- Stella Sigcau
- Max Sisulu
- Zola Skweyiya
- Joe Slovo (died 1995)
- Raymond Suttner
- Adelaide Tambo
- Steve Tshwete*
- Tony Yengeni
- Nkosazana Zuma*

Ex officio members

- Winnie Mandela* (Women's League)
- Nosiviwe Mapisa-Nqakula (Women's League)
- Lulu Johnson* (Youth League)
- Mpho Lekgoro (Youth League)
- Malusi Gigaba* (Youth League)
- Ngaoko Ramathlodi (Northern Transvaal)
- Collins Chabane (Northern Transvaal)
- Popo Molefe (North West)
- Ndleleni Duma (North West)
- Mathews Phosa (Eastern Transvaal)
- Solly Zwane (Eastern Transvaal)
- Tokyo Sexwale (Gauteng)
- Paul Mashatile (Gauteng)
- Jacob Zuma (KwaZulu-Natal)
- Senzo Mchunu (KwaZulu-Natal)
- Pat Matosa (Free State)
- Kaiser Sebothelo (Free State)
- Manne Dipico (Northern Cape)
- William Steenkamp (Northern Cape)
- Dumisani Mafu (Eastern Cape)
- Bongani Gxilishe (Eastern Cape)
- Chris Nissen (Western Cape)
- James Ngculu (Western Cape)

* Members of the National Working Committee

=== National Executive Committee 1997–2002 ===
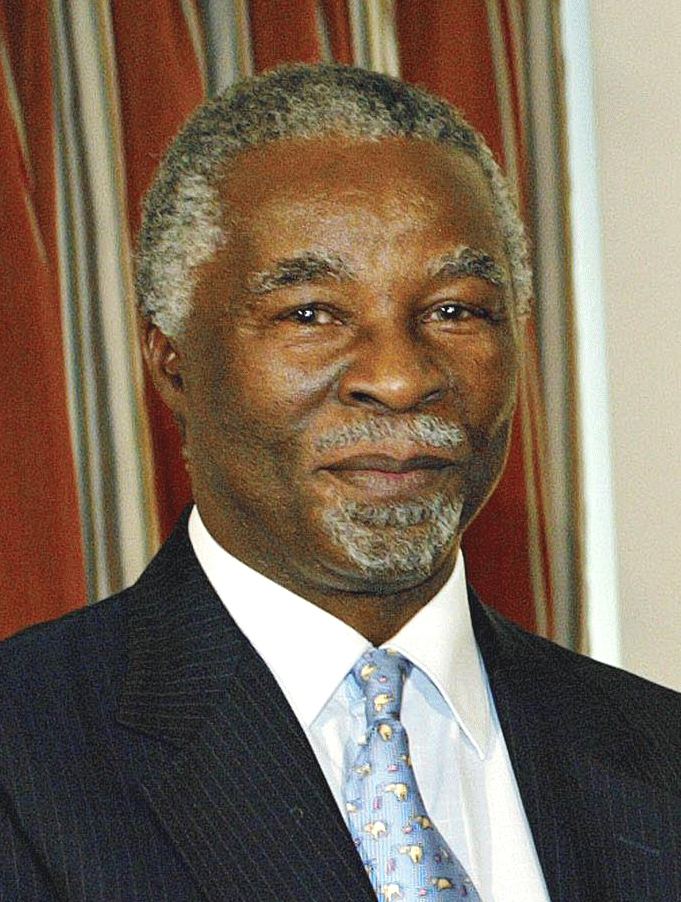
Thabo Mbeki, ANC president from 1997 until 2007

At the ANC's 50th National Conference in Mafikeng in December 1997, Thabo Mbeki was elected Mandela's successor as ANC president. After 1997, as indicated below, eleven additional members were co-opted onto the NEC. Five were co-opted in February 1998, soon after the conference, and the other six were co-opted later to fill vacancies arising from resignations and deaths.

Leadership

- President: Thabo Mbeki
- Deputy President: Jacob Zuma
- Chairperson: Mosiuoa Lekota
- Secretary-General: Kgalema Motlanthe
- Deputy Secretary-General: Thenjiwe Mtintso
- Treasurer-General: Mendi Msimang

Additional members

- Kader Asmal
- Sibusiso Bengu
- Collins Chabane
- Frank Chikane
- Jeremy Cronin
- Phillip Dexter
- Thoko Didiza*
- Manne Dipico
- Jessie Duarte
- Ebrahim Ismail Ebrahim (co-opted 1998)
- Alec Erwin
- Geraldine Fraser-Moleketi
- Frene Ginwala*
- Enoch Godongwana
- Derek Hanekom
- Limpho Hani (resigned)
- Pallo Jordan
- Ronnie Kasrils
- Baleka Kgositsile
- Jomo Khasu (co-opted)
- Brigitte Mabandla*
- Saki Macozoma
- Penuell Maduna*
- Mac Maharaj (resigned)
- Dumisani Makhaye
- Thabang Makwetla (co-opted)
- Winnie Mandela*
- Trevor Manuel
- Mavivi Manzini*
- Nosiviwe Mapisa-Nqakula (co-opted 1998)
- Gill Marcus (resigned)
- Candith Mashego-Dlamini (co-opted)
- January Masilela (co-opted)
- Amos Masondo
- Ivy Matsepe-Casaburri
- Tito Mboweni (resigned)
- Smangaliso Mkhatshwa
- Zweli Mkhize
- Phumzile Mlambo-Ngcuka
- Joe Modise (died 2001)
- Thandi Modise (co-opted 1998)
- Peter Mokaba (died 2002)
- Popo Molefe (resigned)
- Jabu Moleketi
- Valli Moosa
- Sankie Mthembi-Mahanyele
- Sydney Mufamadi*
- Jay Naidoo
- S'bu Ndebele (resigned)
- Joel Netshitenzhe*
- Smuts Ngonyama* (co-opted)
- Joe Nhlanhla*
- Charles Nqakula
- Blade Nzimande
- Alfred Nzo (died 2000)
- Dullah Omar
- Aziz Pahad
- Essop Pahad
- Dipuo Peters (co-opted)
- Jeff Radebe*
- Cyril Ramaphosa
- Ngoako Ramatlhodi (resigned)
- Mbhazima Shilowa
- Stella Sigcau (co-opted 1998)
- Lindiwe Sisulu
- Max Sisulu*
- Zola Skweyiya*
- Manto Tshabalala-Msimang* (co-opted)
- Steve Tshwete (died 2002)
- Tony Yengeni
- Nkosazana Zuma*

Ex officio members

- Nelson Mandela*
- Bathabile Dlamini (Women's League)
- Malusi Gigaba* (Youth League)
- Fikile Mbalula (Youth League)
- Popo Molefe (North West)
- Siphiwe Ngwenya (North West)
- Fish Mahlalela (Mpumalanga)
- Lucas Mello (Mpumalanga)
- Cassel Mathale (Limpopo)
- Ngoako Ramathlodi (Limpopo)
- David Makhura (Gauteng)
- S'bu Ndebele (KwaZulu-Natal)
- Sipho Gcabashe (KwaZulu-Natal)
- Pat Matosa (Free State)
- Ace Magashule (Free State)
- Neville Mompati (Northern Cape)
- Makhenkesi Stofile (Eastern Cape)
- Humphrey Maxegwana (Eastern Cape)
- Ebrahim Rasool (Western Cape)
- Mcebisi Skwatsha (Western Cape)

Observers

- Ngconde Balfour
- Ntombazana Botha
- Winkie Direko
- Dirk du Toit
- Cheryl Gillwald
- Lindiwe Hendricks
- Rejoice Mabudafhasi
- Titus Mafolo
- Nathi Nhleko
- Membathisi Mdladlana
- Mandisi Mpahlwa
- Lawrence Mushwana
- Naledi Pandor
- Ngoako Ramatlhodi
- Nozizwe Madlala-Routledge
- Susan Shabangu
- Enver Surty
- Toine Eggenhuizen
- Lucky Mabasa
- Naph Manana

* Members of the National Working Committee

=== National Executive Committee 2002–2007 ===
The NEC was elected at the ANC's 51st National Conference in Stellenbosch in 2002. The conference effected no change to the senior leadership of the party, except in the position of Deputy Secretary-General. Two additional members were co-opted into the NEC to fill vacancies which arose after 2002 when three members died and one resigned.

Leadership

- President: Thabo Mbeki
- Deputy President: Jacob Zuma
- Chairperson: Mosiuoa Lekota
- Secretary-General: Kgalema Motlanthe
- Deputy Secretary-General: Sankie Mthembi-Mahanyele
- Treasurer-General: Mendi Msimang

Additional members

- Kader Asmal
- Collins Chabane
- Frank Chikane
- Jeremy Cronin
- Phillip Dexter
- Thoko Didiza*
- Manne Dipico
- Nkosazana Dlamini-Zuma*
- Jessie Duarte
- Ebrahim Ebrahim
- Alec Erwin
- Geraldine Fraser-Moleketi
- Malusi Gigaba
- Frene Ginwala
- Enoch Godongwana
- Derek Hanekom
- Pallo Jordan*
- Ronnie Kasrils
- Brigitte Mabandla*
- Saki Macozoma
- Penuell Maduna*
- Dumisani Makhaye (died 2004)
- Thabang Makwetla
- Winnie Mandela (resigned)
- Trevor Manuel
- Nosiviwe Mapisa-Nqakula*
- Beatrice Marshoff (co-opted)
- Amos Masondo
- Ivy Matsepe-Casaburri
- Mavivi Manzini*
- Baleka Mbete*
- Membathisi Mdladlana
- Smangaliso Mkhatshwa
- Zweli Mkhize
- Phumzile Mlambo-Ngcuka*
- Thandi Modise
- Popo Molefe
- Jabu Moleketi
- Valli Moosa
- Thenjiwe Mtintso
- Sydney Mufamadi*
- Joel Netshitenzhe*
- Smuts Ngonyama*
- Charles Nqakula
- Blade Nzimande
- Dullah Omar (died 2004)
- Aziz Pahad
- Essop Pahad
- Naledi Pandor
- Dipuo Peters
- Mathews Phosa
- Jeff Radebe*
- Cyril Ramaphosa
- Ngoako Ramatlhodi
- Susan Shabangu
- Stella Sigcau (died 2006)
- Lindiwe Sisulu*
- Max Sisulu*
- Zola Skweyiya*
- Manto Tshabalala-Msimang*
- Ouma Tsopo (co-opted)
- Tony Yengeni

Ex officio members

- Nelson Mandela
- Fikile Mbalula* (Youth League)

* Members of the National Working Committee

=== National Executive Committee 2007–2012 ===
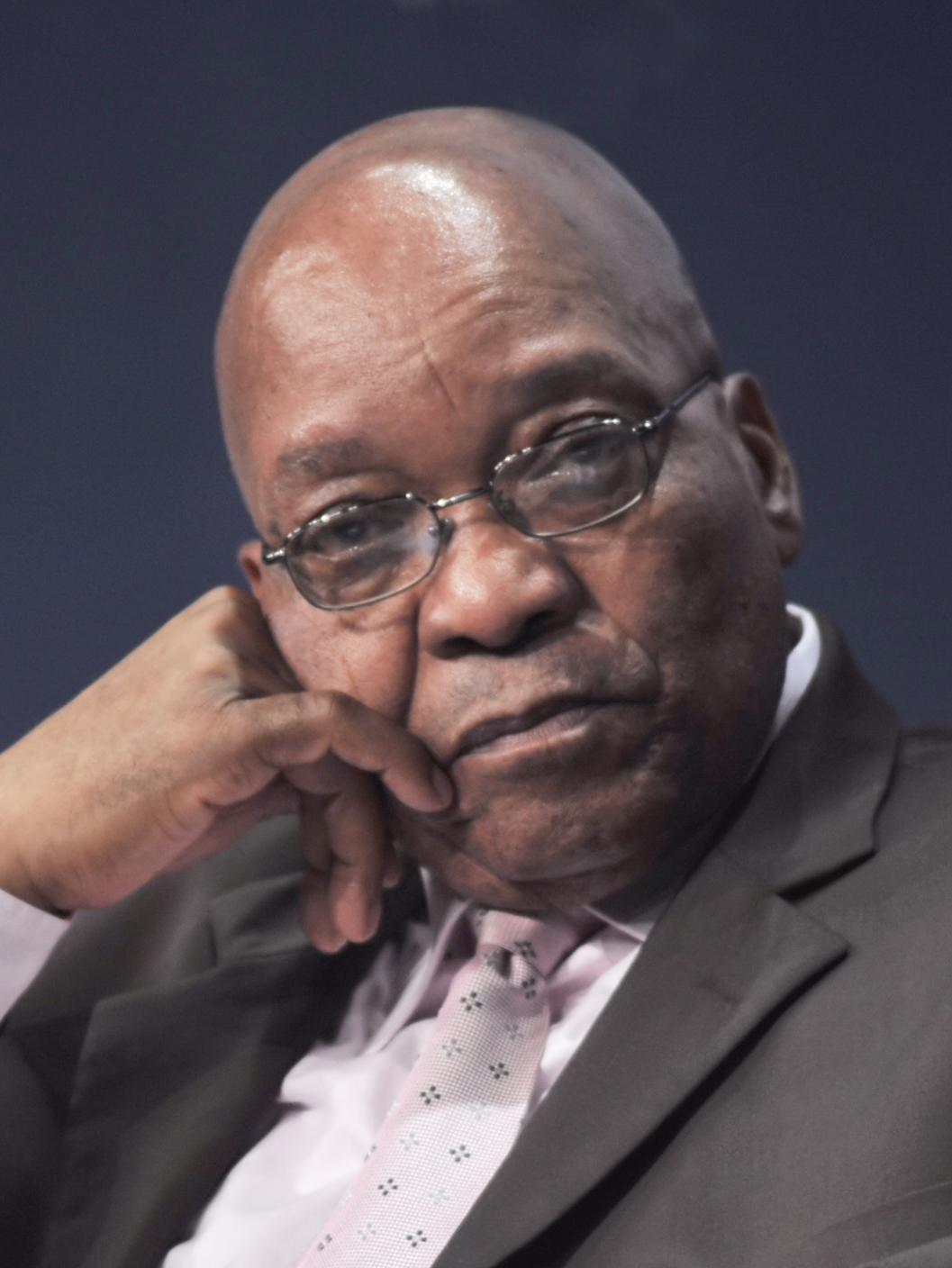
Jacob Zuma, ANC president from 2007 until 2017

The NEC was elected at the ANC's 52nd National Conference in Polokwane in December 2007. Incumbent ANC and national president Thabo Mbeki was defeated by Jacob Zuma in the vote for the Presidency. After 2007, three members died and six resigned (two to defect to the newly founded Congress of the People); only three of those vacancies were filled by co-opting replacements.

Leadership

- President: Jacob Zuma
- Deputy President: Kgalema Motlanthe
- Chairperson: Baleka Mbete
- Secretary-General: Gwede Mantashe
- Deputy Secretary-General: Thandi Modise
- Treasurer-General: Mathews Phosa

Additional members

- Nozabelo Ruth Bhengu
- Nyami Booi
- Lynne Brown
- Rosemary Capa
- Bheki Cele (resigned)
- Collins Chabane*
- Jeremy Cronin
- Nkosazana Dlamini-Zuma
- Bathabile Dlamini*
- Ayanda Dlodlo
- Jessie Duarte*
- Ndleleni Duma
- Ebrahim Ebrahim
- Malusi Gigaba
- Enoch Godongwana
- Derek Hanekom
- Hazel Jenkins
- Tina Joemat-Pettersson*
- Pallo Jordan*
- Ncumisa Kondlo* (died 2008)
- Charlotte Lobe (resigned)
- Janet Love (resigned)
- Brigitte Mabandla
- Rejoice Mabudafhasi
- David Mabuza
- Nozizwe Madlala-Routledge (resigned)
- Dikeledi Magadzi
- Ace Magashule
- Kgomotso Magau (co-opted)
- Sibongile Manana
- Winnie Mandela
- Trevor Manuel
- Nosiviwe Mapisa-Nqakula
- Billy Masetlha
- Joyce Mashamba
- Phumulo Masualle
- Noluthando Mayende-Sibiya*
- Fikile Mbalula*
- Nomaindia Mfeketo*
- Zweli Mkhize
- Nomvula Mokonyane
- Ellen Molekane (co-opted)
- Joyce Moloi-Moropa
- Valli Moosa (resigned)
- Playfair Morule
- Angie Motshekga*
- Mathole Motshekga
- Aaron Motsoaledi
- Sankie Mthembi-Mahanyele
- Jackson Mthembu
- Nathi Mthethwa*
- Thenjiwe Mtintso
- Thaba Mufamadi
- S'bu Ndebele
- Joel Netshitenzhe
- Maite Nkoana-Mashabane*
- Nosipho Ntwanambi
- Siphiwe Nyanda*
- Blade Nzimande*
- Naledi Pandor
- Joe Phaahla
- Febe Potgieter-Gqubule
- Dina Pule*
- Jeff Radebe*
- Cyril Ramaphosa
- Ngoako Ramatlhodi
- Tokyo Sexwale
- Susan Shabangu*
- Sicelo Shiceka (died 2012)
- Lyndall Shope-Mafole (resigned)
- Lindiwe Sisulu*
- Max Sisulu*
- Salome Sithole (co-opted)
- Zola Skweyiya
- Makhenkesi Stofile*
- Thandi Tobias
- Sisi Tolashe
- Manto Tshabalala-Msimang (died 2009)
- Sue van der Merwe
- Fikile Xasa
- Lumka Yengeni
- Tony Yengeni*
- Lindiwe Zulu

Ex officio members

- Nelson Mandela
- Thabo Mbeki

* Members of the National Working Committee

=== National Executive Committee 2012–2017 ===
The NEC was elected at the ANC's 53rd National Conference in Mangaung in December 2012, and Jacob Zuma was elected ANC president for a second term. Four members were co-opted onto the NEC after 2012 to fill vacancies arising from deaths.

Leadership

- President: Jacob Zuma
- Deputy President: Cyril Ramaphosa
- Chairperson: Baleka Mbete
- Secretary-General: Gwede Mantashe
- Deputy Secretary-General: Jessie Duarte
- Treasurer-General: Zweli Mkhize

Additional members

- Obed Bapela
- Nozabelo Ruth Bhengu
- Lynne Brown
- Rosemary Capa
- Bheki Cele
- Collins Chabane* (died 2015)
- Siyabonga Cwele
- Rob Davies
- Thoko Didiza
- Nkosazana Dlamini-Zuma
- Bathabile Dlamini*
- Sidumo Dlamini
- Ayanda Dlodlo
- Beauty Dlulane
- Ebrahim Ismail Ebrahim
- Lungi Gcabashe
- Malusi Gigaba*
- Enoch Godongwana
- Pravin Gordhan
- Derek Hanekom*
- Tina Joemat-Pettersson*
- Pallo Jordan (resigned)
- Zizi Kodwa
- Dipuo Letsatsi-Duba
- Pule Mabe
- Sisi Mabe* (died 2014)
- Rejoice Mabudafhasi
- Nocawe Mafu
- Dikeledi Magadzi
- David Mahlobo*
- Fikile Majola
- Winnie Mandela
- Jane Manganye
- Kebby Maphatsoe
- Nosiviwe Mapisa-Nqakula*
- Philly Mapulane
- Billy Masetlha
- Joyce Mashamba
- Sam Mashinini
- Fikile Mbalula (co-opted)
- Tito Mboweni
- Nomaindia Mfeketo*
- Reginah Mhaule (co-opted)
- Humphrey Mmemezi
- Nomvula Mokonyane*
- Pinky Mokoto
- Edna Molewa
- Joyce Moloi-Moropa
- Pinky Moloi
- Angie Motshekga
- Mathole Motshekga (co-opted)
- Aaron Motsoaledi*
- Sankie Mthembi-Mahanyele
- Jackson Mthembu*
- Nathi Mthethwa*
- Thenjiwe Mtintso
- S'bu Ndebele
- Joel Netshitenzhe
- Maite Nkoana-Mashabane*
- Gugile Nkwinti
- Sisi Ntombela*
- Nosipho Ntwanambi (died 2014)
- Thulas Nxesi
- Blade Nzimande*
- Mildred Oliphant
- Naledi Pandor*
- Dipuo Peters (co-opted)
- Joe Phaahla
- Jeff Radebe*
- Ngoako Ramatlhodi
- Miriam Segabutla
- Machwene Rosina Semenya
- Susan Shabangu*
- Lindiwe Sisulu*
- Max Sisulu
- Stone Sizani
- Mcebisi Skwatsha
- Sisisi Tolashe
- Pam Tshwete
- Sue van der Merwe
- Fikile Xasa*
- Tony Yengeni
- Senzeni Zokwana
- Lindiwe Zulu*

Ex officio members

- John Block (Northern Cape)
- Zamani Saul (Northern Cape)
- Phumulo Masualle (Eastern Cape)
- Oscar Mabuyane (Eastern Cape)
- Marius Fransman (Western Cape)
- Mjongile Songezo (Western Cape)
- David Mabuza (Mpumalanga)
- Lucky Ndinisa (Mpumalanga)
- Paul Mashatile (Gauteng)
- David Makhura (Gauteng)
- Supra Mahumapelo (North West)
- Kabelo Mataboge (North West)
- Cassel Mathale (Limpopo)
- Soviet Lekganyane (Limpopo)
- Sihle Zikalala (KwaZulu-Natal)
- Makgwe Ntate (Free State)
- Natso Khumalo (Veterans' League)
- Sandi Sejake (Veterans' League)

* Members of the National Working Committee

=== National Executive Committee 2017–2022 ===
In December 2017, the 54th National Conference, held at Nasrec, elected ANC deputy president Cyril Ramaphosa to succeed Jacob Zuma as ANC president. It also elected a new NEC. In October 2019, four additional members were co-opted onto the committee.

Leadership

- President: Cyril Ramaphosa
- Deputy President: David Mabuza
- Chairperson: Gwede Mantashe
- Secretary-General: Ace Magashule
- Deputy Secretary-General: Jessie Duarte
- Treasurer-General: Paul Mashatile

Additional members

- Obed Bapela
- Sibongile Besani
- Ruth Bhengu
- Bongani Bongo
- Alvin Botes
- Sfiso Buthelezi
- Firoz Cachalia (co-opted 2019)
- Rosemary Capa
- Bheki Cele
- Sindisiwe Chikunga
- Barbara Creecy
- Siyabonga Cwele
- Thoko Didiza
- Bathabile Dlamini
- Sdumo Dlamini
- Nkosazana Dlamini-Zuma
- Ayanda Dlodlo (co-opted 2019)
- Beauty Dlulane
- Malusi Gigaba
- Enoch Godongwana
- Pravin Gordhan
- Mondli Gungubele
- Derek Hanekom
- Tina Joemat-Pettersson
- Nkenke Kekana
- Pinky Kekana
- Noxolo Kiviet
- Zizi Kodwa
- Mmamoloko Kubayi
- Ronald Lamola
- Dakota Legoete
- Dipuo Letsatsi-Duba
- Zingiswa Losi
- Sylvia Lucas
- Pule Mabe
- Rejoice Mabudafhasi
- Nocawe Mafu
- Dikeledi Magadzi
- Tandi Mahambehlala
- David Mahlobo
- Collen Maine
- Pemmy Majodina
- Neva Makgetla
- Thabang Makwetla
- Mduduzi Manana
- Nosiviwe Mapisa-Nqakula
- Lindiwe Maseko (co-opted 2019)
- Candith Mashego-Dlamini
- David Masondo
- Phumulo Masualle
- Joe Maswanganyi
- Fikile Mbalula
- Baleka Mbete
- Tito Mboweni
- Senzo Mchunu
- Nomaindia Mfeketo
- Reginah Mhaule
- Hlengiwe Mkhize
- Zweli Mkhize
- Thandi Modise
- Nomvula Mokonyane
- Edna Molewa (died 2018)
- Pinky Moloi
- Angie Motshekga
- Mathole Motshekga
- Aaron Motsoaledi
- Jackson Mthembu
- Nathi Mthethwa
- Faith Muthambi
- Joel Netshitenzhe
- Maite Nkoana-Mashabane
- Blade Nzimande (co-opted 2019)
- Mildred Oliphant
- Naledi Pandor
- Jeff Radebe
- Ngoako Ramathlodi
- Gwen Ramokgopa
- Susan Shabangu
- Lindiwe Sisulu
- Violet Siwela
- Pamela Tshwete
- Tokozile Xasa
- Tony Yengeni
- Lindiwe Zulu
- Mosebenzi Zwane

Ex officio members

- William Bulwane
- Faiez Jacobs
- Natso Khumalo
- Oscar Mabuyane
- Khaya Magaxa
- Supra Mahumapelo
- Stanley Mathabatha
- Mookgo Matuba
- Mandla Ndlovu
- Deshi Ngxanga
- Njabulo Nzuza
- Hope Papo
- Zamani Saul
- Nocks Seabi
- Sihle Zikalala
- Super Zuma

== See also ==
- Provincial Executive Committees of the African National Congress
