= List of members of the 2002–07 African National Congress National Executive Committee =

Elected leaders from 2002 to 2007

This is a list of the members of the National Executive Committee of the African National Congress who were elected at the 51st national conference in 2002. Most active members were replaced at the 52nd National Conference in 2007.

== Composition of the NEC ==
- Thabo Mbeki - President
- Jacob Zuma - Deputy President
- Mosiuoa Lekota - National Chairperson
- Kgalema Motlanthe - Secretary General
- Sankie Mthembi-Mahanyele - Deputy Secretary General
- Mendi Msimang - Treasurer General
- Nelson Mandela - (Ex Officio)

=== Additional Members ===
- Kader Asmal
- Collins Chabane
- Frank Chikane
- Jeremy Cronin
- Phillip Dexter
- Thoko Didiza
- Manne Dipico
- Nkosazana Dlamini-Zuma
- Jessie Duarte
- Ebrahim Ebrahim
- Alec Erwin
- Geraldine Fraser-Moleketi
- Malusi Gigaba
- Frene Ginwala
- Enoch Godongwana
- Derek Hanekom
- Pallo Jordan
- Ronnie Kasrils
- Brigitte Mabandla
- Saki Macozoma
- Penuell Maduna
- Thabang Makwetla
- Trevor Manuel
- Nosiviwe Mapisa-Nqakula
- Beatrice Marshoff
- Amos Masondo
- Ivy Matsepe-Casaburri
- Baleka Mbete
- Membathisi Mdladlana
- Smangaliso Mkhatshwa
- Zweli Mkhize
- Phumzile Mlambo-Ngcuka
- Thandi Modise
- Popo Molefe
- Jabu Moleketi
- Mohammed Valli Moosa
- Thenjiwe Mtintso
- Sydney Mufamadi
- Mavivi Myakayaka-Manzini
- Joel Netshitenzhe
- Smuts Ngonyama
- Charles Nqakula
- Blade Nzimande
- Aziz Pahad
- Essop Pahad
- Naledi Pandor
- Dipuo Peters
- Mathews Phosa
- Jeff Radebe
- Cyril Ramaphosa
- Ngoako Ramatlhodi
- Susan Shabangu
- Lindiwe Sisulu
- Max Sisulu
- Zola Skweyiya
- Manto Tshabalala-Msimang
- Ouma Tsopo
- Tony Yengeni

=== Ex Officio Members ===
==== Gauteng ====
- David Makhura
- Mbhazima Shilowa

==== Free State ====
- Ace Magashule
- Charlotte Lobe

==== North West ====
- Supra Mahumapelo
- Edna Molewa

==== Western Cape ====
- James Ngculu
- Mcebisi Skwatsha

==== Mpumalanga ====
- Thabang Makwetla
- Lucas Mello

==== Limpopo ====
- Cassel Mathale
- Sello Moloto

==== KwaZulu/Natal ====
- Sibusiso Ndebele
- Senzo Mchunu

==== Eastern Cape ====
- Makhenkesi Stofile
- Humphrey Maxegwana

==== Northern Cape ====
- Neville Mompati
- John Block

==== Women's League ====
- Bathabile Dlamini

==== Youth League ====
- Fikile Mbalula
- Sihle Zikalala

=== Observers ===
  1. Ngconde Balfour
  2. Nosimo Balindlela
  3. Jean Benjamin
  4. Ntombazana Botha
  5. Rob Davies
  6. Johnny De Lange
  7. Dirk du Toit
  8. Mluleki George
  9. Cheryl Gillwald
 10. Mbulelo Goniwe
 11. Nomatyala Hangana
 12. Lindiwe Hendricks
 13. Peggy Hollander
 14. John Jeffery
 15. Joyce Mabudafhasi
 16. M. J. Mahlangu

 15. Gwen Mahlangu
 16. Vytjie Mentor
 17. Dorothy Motubatse
 18. Mandisi Mpahlwa
 19. Andries Nel
 20. Gert Oosthuizen
 21. Roy Padayachie
 22. Ebrahim Rasool
 23. Nozizwe Routledge-Madlala
 24. Buyelwa Sonjica
 25. Enver Surty
 26. Elizabeth Thabethe
 27. Sue Van der Merwe
 28. Victor Vusumuzi Windvoel
 29. Lulama Xingwana
 30. Marthinus van Schalkwyk
