= Sankie Mthembi-Mahanyele =

South African politician (born 1951)

Deputy Secretary General of the African National Congress
- In office December 2002 – December 2007
- President: Thabo Mbeki
- Secretary: Kgalema Motlanthe
- Preceded by: Thenjiwe Mtintso
- Succeeded by: Thandi Modise

Minister of Housing
- In office 1995–2003
- President: Nelson Mandela; Thabo Mbeki
- Preceded by: Joe Slovo
- Succeeded by: Brigitte Mabandla

Personal details
- Born: Sankie Dolly Mthembi; 23 March 1951 (age 75) Sophiatown, Johannesburg; Transvaal, Union of South Africa
- Party: African National Congress
- Spouse(s): Winston Nkondo (divorced) Mohale Mahanyele (m. 1996; died 2012)
- Children: Nare
- Education: University of the North

Sankie Dolly Mthembi-Mahanyele (née Mthembi; born 23 March 1951), formerly known as Sankie Mthembi-Nkondo or Sankie Nkondo, is a South African politician, diplomat, and former anti-apartheid activist. She was the Minister of Housing from 1995 to 2003 and served as Deputy Secretary-General of the African National Congress (ANC) from 2002 to 2007.

== Early life and activism ==
Mthembi-Mahanyele was born on 23 March 1951 in Sophiatown in Johannesburg. She matriculated at Sekane-Ntoane High School in Soweto in 1970 and then attended the politically tumultuous University of the North, graduating with a bachelor's degree in 1976.

After graduating, Mthembi-Mahanyele went into exile abroad with the African National Congress (ANC), which was then based in Lusaka, Zambia. She was a journalist on Radio Freedom and worked under Thabo Mbeki in the ANC's department of international affairs. During this period (and thereafter), she wrote literature under the pseudonym Rebecca Matlou.

== Post-apartheid political career ==
=== Government ===
After the end of apartheid in 1994, she was appointed Deputy Minister of Welfare in the South African government, under President Nelson Mandela. She stood for election as the ANC's Deputy Secretary-General at the ANC's 49th National Conference in December 1994, but – although she was believed to have the support of Mandela, Mbeki, and Jacob Zuma – lost "decisively" to the more left-wing candidate, Cheryl Carolus.

Following the death of Joe Slovo, she was Minister of Housing from early 1995 to early 2003, serving under both Mandela and his successor, Mbeki. In 1999, she sued the Mail & Guardian for defamation, in connection to the newspaper's claim in December 1998 that Mthembi-Mahanyele had awarded a housing contract to a friend; the Supreme Court of Appeal ultimately agreed with the Johannesburg High Court that the report did not amount to defamation. In 2003, she won an award from United Nations Habitat for her work in the housing portfolio.

=== Later career ===
Mthembi-Mahanyele's resignation from the cabinet followed her election as Deputy Secretary-General of the ANC at the party's 51st National Conference in December 2002. She served in that position until the 52nd National Conference in December 2007, when she did not stand for re-election. In later years, she served as chairman of South Africa's Central Energy Fund from February 2012 until her resignation in 2015. She was South Africa's Ambassador to Switzerland from 2018 until 2022, when she was appointed Ambassador to Spain.

== Personal life ==
While in exile, Mthembi-Mahanyele was married to Zinjiva Winston Nkondo and was known as Sankie Mthembi-Nkondo. Nkondo was also an ANC activist and writer (under the pseudonym Victor Matlou); they divorced. In 1996, Mthembi-Mahanyele married Mohale Mahanyele (born 1939, died 2012), a businessman. They had one daughter, Nare, together.
