= Skweyiya =

Skweyiya is a surname. Notable people with the surname include:

- Thembile Skweyiya (1939–2015), South African judge
- Zola Skweyiya (1942–2018), South African politician
