= Mandela and Tambo =

South African law firm

- Headquarters: Chancellor House, Ferreirasdorp (Johannesburg)
- Major practice areas: General practice
- Key people: Nelson Mandela and Oliver Tambo
- Date founded: 1952
- Dissolved: 1960 (Due to the founders involvement in the Anti-Apartheid Movement)

Mandela and Tambo was a South African law firm established by Nelson Mandela and Oliver Tambo in Johannesburg in late 1952. It was the first "Attorney Firm" in the country to be run by black partners.

In August 1952, Mandela had opened his own firm but, after just several months, he invited Tambo to join him in the establishment of Mandela and Tambo in two small rooms at Chancellor House, the building housing the headquarters of the African National Congress. The firm was inundated with clients seeking redress from acts of the oppressive apartheid regime. In South Africa, "Attorney Firms" would deal with lay clients directly and draft most of the paperwork, and "instruct" an Advocate, either practising independently or in-house with the firm, to plead before the Court. Tambo would do much of the paperwork in the office whilst Mandela did most of the advocacy before the magistrates in the courts opposite.

Later others joined the firm, including Duma Nokwe, Ruth Mompati, Mendi Msimang and Godfrey Pitje.

The firm was closed down in 1960 as Mandela faced charges of treason and Tambo fled the country. The law office building was later gutted by fire and was an urban slum for many years before being completely refurbished and opened as the Chancellor House museum and archive in 2011.

Mandela and Tambo were personally reunited in an emotional private meeting in Stockholm in March 1990.
