= Makhatini =

Makhathini or Makatini is a South African surname. Notable people with the name include:

- Johnny Makatini (1932–1988), South African politician and anti-apartheid activist
- Nduduzo Makhathini (born 1982), South African jazz musician
