= Florence Mophosho =

Anti-apartheid activist (1921–1985)

Florence Mophosho OLS
- Born: 1921; Alexandra, Transvaal; Union of South Africa
- Died: 9 August 1985 (aged 64); Morogoro, Tanzania
- Political party: African National Congress

Florence Mophosho (1921 – 9 August 1985) was a South African politician and anti-apartheid activist of the African National Congress (ANC). A stalwart of the ANC Women's League, she was a member of the ANC National Executive Committee from 1975 until her death in 1985.

After joining the ANC in 1952 in Alexandra, Mophosho was involved in organising several historic anti-apartheid protests inside South Africa, including the 1956 Women's March and the 1957 Alexandra bus boycott. From 1964 until her death, she lived in exile with the ANC, rising to prominence as the organisation's representative to the Women's International Democratic Federation and then, from 1971, as the head of the ANC Women's Section.

== Early life and activism ==
Mophosho was born in 1921 in Alexandra, a township outside Johannesburg in the former Transvaal. Her father was chronically ill and her mother, though trained as a teacher, worked as a domestic worker. The eldest of three siblings, Mophosho left school at Standard Six to enter the workforce, first as a domestic worker and then as a worker in a garment factory.

She joined the African National Congress (ANC) in 1952, inspired by the party's Defiance Campaign of that year. She became involved in organising the ANC's next major campaign, the 1955 Congress of the People; she travelled Alexandra soliciting residents' proposals for the Freedom Charter. She also joined the ANC Women's League and was a member of the executive of the Federation of South African Women; in that capacity, she helped organise the national Women's March of 1956. The following year, she was a member of the committee that organised the Alexandra bus boycott. Later described by Maggie Resha as "a magic organiser", Mophosho ultimately became a full-time organiser for the ANC. She was arrested in 1958 during a women's anti-dompas protest in Johannesburg.

== Activism in exile ==
=== Women's International Democratic Federation ===
After the ANC was outlawed in 1960, Mophosho continued to work for the organisation underground, though she was arrested on several occasions and served with a banning order in 1964. Later in 1964, on the instructions of the ANC, she left the country for Lusaka, Zambia, later travelling to Dar es Salaam, Tanzania. In exile, she became a full-time representative of the ANC, initially at the Women's International Democratic Federation (WIDF), an international socialist organisation. She was stationed at WIDF's secretariat in East Berlin from 1964 to 1969.

In 1969, Mophosho was the only woman delegate to the ANC's Morogoro Conference in Tanzania. Shortly afterwards, she wrote to her friend Ray Alexander, "I intend going back to Africa towards the end of the year, I feel I have done my bit some body else should come [to Berlin] and represent you people."

=== ANC Women's Section ===
Mophosho returned to Africa in 1970 and settled at the ANC's office in Morogoro, Tanzania, where she worked in the secretariat of the ANC Women's Section. The Women's Section was the interim replacement for the ANC Women's League – which was defunct while the ANC was exiled – and Mophosho became its head in 1971, succeeding Ruth Mompati. Over the next decade, Mophosho travelled extensively to represent the ANC abroad, including at the All-Africa Women's Conference of 1972, and she received military training in Lusaka in 1978. She was particularly active in advocating for better childcare for ANC members who were mothers, and, with her secretary Gertrude Shope, she established Voice of the Women, a publication for ANC women. In addition, she was co-opted onto the ANC National Executive Committee in 1975. She remained a member of the committee until her death, gaining direct election in 1985.

== Personal life and death ==
Mosphosho had children, who were raised by her family inside South Africa. She was intermittently ill in the early 1980s – she was treated for an ulcer in the Soviet Union – and died in Morogoro on 9 August 1985, the 29th anniversary of the Women's March. She was buried in Lusaka, where the ANC was headquartered at the time. In April 2007, she was awarded the Order of Luthuli by Thabo Mbeki, the second post-apartheid president, for:

Her excellent contribution to the anti-apartheid struggle, braving police harassment to mobilise society for a just and democratic South Africa, and striving for gender equality.
