= Mavivi Myakayaka-Manzini =

South African politician and diplomat (born 1956)

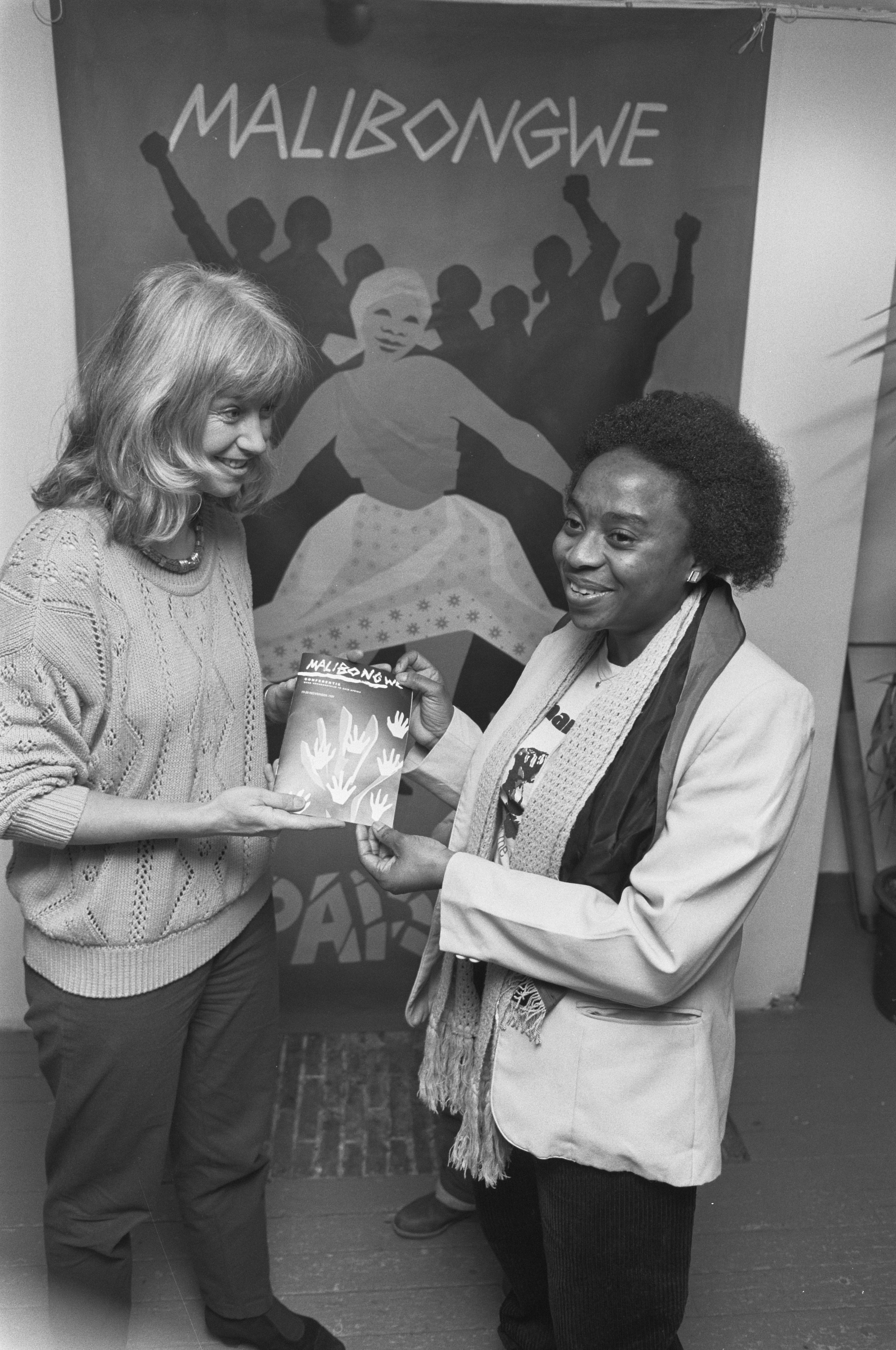
- Myakayaka-Manzini (right) with Conny Braam in February 1989

High Commissioner to Malawi of the Republic of South Africa
- Incumbent
- Assumed office 2022
- President: Cyril Ramaphosa

High Commissioner to Namibia of the Republic of South Africa
- In office 2012–2017
- President: Jacob Zuma
- Succeeded by: William Whitehead

Deputy President of the African National Congress Women's League
- In office 2003–2008
- President: Nosiviwe Mapisa-Nqakula
- Succeeded by: Nosiphiwo Mwambi

Personal details
- Born: Yvette Lillian Mavivi Myakayaka; 19 January 1956 (age 70) Alexandra, Transvaal; South Africa
- Citizenship: South African
- Party: African National Congress
- Education: University of Zambia; Institute of Social Studies
- Occupation: Politician; diplomat; anti-apartheid activist; gender activist

Mavivi Myakayaka-Manzini (born 19 January 1956), also known as Mavivi Manzini, is a South African politician and diplomat who is currently the South African High Commissioner to Malawi. She was a member of the National Executive Committee of the African National Congress (ANC) between 1994 and 2007 and she was deputy president of the ANC Women's League between 2003 and 2008. During apartheid, she worked in exile in the secretariat of the ANC's women's section; in the 2000s, after one term in the national Parliament (1994–1999), she headed the ANC's international relations desk.

== Early life and education ==
Yvette Lillian Mavivi Myakayaka was born on 19 January 1956 in Alexandra on the outskirts of Johannesburg in what was then the Transvaal (now Gauteng province) and spent most of her childhood in Soweto. Her parents were teachers and were members of the African National Congress (ANC) until it was banned by the apartheid government in 1960. As a child, between roughly age four and age six, she was hospitalised with polio and was left disabled, with a permanent limp. She became politically active as a teenager in about 1973, joining the Black Consciousness-aligned South African Students' Movement while still in high school. After her arrival at the University of the North (Turfloop) in 1975, she was active in the South African Students' Organisation, which was banned on the campus at the time. Also around 1975, she became involved in the ANC underground, helping to establish a covert ANC unit on the Turfloop campus which assisted members of the ANC's armed wing, Umkhonto weSizwe, in particular with reconnaissance.

The Soweto uprising began in the middle of Myakayaka-Mavivi's second year in 1976 and she was detained in July for her political activity. In October 1976, after two months in detention, she left South Africa via Botswana to avoid further security police attention and join the ANC in exile. She studied political science, sociology, and development studies at the University of Zambia and received a Bachelor's degree in 1979. Later, in 1989, she received a Master's degree in development studies, specialising in gender and development, from the Institute of Social Studies in the Hague, the Netherlands.

== Early political career ==
After receiving her Bachelor's, Myakayaka-Manzini became a full-time member of the secretariat of the Women's Section of the ANC, then based in Lusaka, Zambia. From 1981 she was editor of the Voice of Women magazine, the primary propaganda organ of the Women's Section, working alongside Marion Sparg and others. She also broadcast on the ANC's Radio Freedom and was a founding member of the Congress of African Women, later known as the Pan African Women's Congress. After completing her Master's in the Netherlands, she moved to Tanzania, where her husband was the ANC's chief representative.

When the ANC was unbanned by the South African government in 1990, Myakayaka-Manzini returned to South Africa and worked at the Centre for Applied Legal Studies at the University of the Witwatersrand, conducting research on gender-related topics. From 1990 to 1992, she also headed the Johannesburg branch of the ANC Women's League, which was then being re-established inside South Africa. From 1992, she was a member of the ANC delegation to the negotiations that ended apartheid and devised a new post-apartheid constitution; she and Baleka Mbete represented the Women's League on the delegation. In 1993 and 1994, she was a member of the sub-council on the status of women in the multi-party Transitional Executive Council that oversaw the transition away from apartheid.

In 1997, Myakayaka-Manzini applied for amnesty from the Truth and Reconciliation Commission in relation to her work for the ANC in exile. Hers was part of a batch of applications submitted jointly by the ANC on behalf of a group of members and leaders who collectively took responsibility for policy decisions that they acknowledged had led to human rights violations committed by ANC cadres. The commission refused amnesty to her and the other applicants on the grounds that they had not disclosed any specific act, in which they individually had been involved, for which they would be required to seek amnesty.

== Post-apartheid career ==
In South Africa's first fully democratic election in 1994, Myakayaka-Manzini was elected as a Member of Parliament, representing the ANC. In 1996 she was appointed a parliamentary counsellor and she was described as "Thabo Mbeki's 'eyes and ears' in parliament" while Mbeki was national deputy president. She left Parliament in 1999, in her account because, once the new Constitution had been finalised, she "felt like I have done my job". She took up work at the international relations desk at Luthuli House, the ANC's new headquarters; she was head of the desk by 2000 and remained in that position in October 2007.

Simultaneously, Myakayaka-Manzini served three consecutive terms on the ANC National Executive Committee, gaining election in 1994 (ranked 55th of 60 elected candidates), in 1997 (ranked 43rd), and in 2002 (ranked 34th). In 1997, she also ran unsuccessfully for election as ANC Deputy Secretary-General; it was understood that her candidacy was supported by Mbeki, who was then the Deputy President of South Africa, but she was narrowly beaten by the more left-wing candidate, Thenjiwe Mtintso, earning 1,172 votes to Mtintso's 1,398. In 2007, at the party conference which also removed Mbeki from the ANC presidency, Myakayaka-Manzini lost her seat on the National Executive Committee; she had stood for re-election but did not achieve enough votes.

She remained active in activism for women and was a senior member of the ANC Women's League. Having first gained a seat on the National Executive Committee of the Women's League in 1999, she was deputy president of the league from 2003 to 2008. She became the inaugural spokesperson of the Progressive Women's Movement of South Africa when it was launched in July 2006.

In 2010, Baleka Mbete, by then the national chairperson of the ANC, said that she lobbied for Myakayaka-Manzini to become Director-General in the new Department of Women, Youth, Children and Persons with Disabilities, but that Myakayaka-Manzini had been earmarked for a diplomatic role. Thus she was the South African High Commissioner to Namibia from April 2012 to December 2017. In 2020 she was appointed to the board of the South African Post Office. She also remained involved in the ANC; she was appointed to the seven-member appeals committee of the party's Integrity Commission in 2021. In September 2022, the government announced her appointment as South African High Commissioner to Malawi.

== Personal life ==
Myakayaka-Manzi was married to Manala Manzini, a former Director-General of the National Intelligence Agency, until around 2007. Their marriage was allegedly abusive, which Myakayaka-Manzi spoke about publicly after Manzini was quoted in the media claiming that he used to beat Manzini for refusing to do domestic work. They had at least one child, a daughter, together.

== Selected bibliography ==
- Manzini, Mavivi (1994-01-01). "Road to Beijing". Agenda. 10 (23): 101–103. doi:10.1080/10130950.1994.9675382. ISSN 1013-0950.
- Manzini, Mavivi (1995-01-01). "Woman with Vision". Agenda. 11 (24): 39–39. doi:10.1080/10130950.1995.9675393. ISSN 1013-0950.
