= Jomo Khasu =

South African politician

Member of the National Assembly
- In office May 1994 – June 1999

Personal details
- Born: 15 July 1961 (age 64)
- Citizenship: South Africa
- Party: African National Congress

Mahlomola Johnson "Jomo" Khasu (born 15 July 1961) is a South African politician, diplomat and civil servant who represented the African National Congress (ANC) in the National Assembly from 1994 to 1999. After that he served in the North West Provincial Legislature, where he was a member of the North West Executive Council until Premier Popo Molefe fired him in January 2001. He was a member of the United Democratic Front national executive committee during the 1980s and later served as South African Ambassador to Gabon.

== Early life and activism ==
Khasu was born on 15 July 1961. During apartheid, he was active in political organising in the former Bophuthatswana homeland. He was a member of the national executive of the United Democratic Front and was detained during the state of emergency imposed in June 1986. His brother, Khotso Frank Khasu, went into exile with Umkhonto we Sizwe and later became a civil servant and businessman.

== Legislative career ==
=== National Assembly ===
In South Africa's first post-apartheid elections in 1994, Khasu was elected to represent the ANC in the National Assembly, the lower house of the South African Parliament. In February 1998, he was additionally co-opted as a member of the ANC National Executive Committee (NEC), and he was elected as Deputy Provincial Secretary of the ANC in the North West later that year, serving under Provincial Chairperson Popo Molefe.

=== North West Provincial Legislature ===
He held his seat in the National Assembly until the next general election in 1999, in which he was elected to the North West Provincial Legislature. During the legislative term that followed, he served as the North West's Member of the Executive Council (MEC) for Agriculture, Conservation and Environmental Affairs. By early 2001, Khasu was under investigation for misuse of his government-issued credit card: he had allegedly spent close to R80,000 of public funds on personal items, including liquor, jewellery, and a family holiday.

In January 2001, Molefe, in his capacity as Premier of the North West, announced that Khasu had resigned from the Executive Council but would remain an ordinary Member of the Provincial Legislature; the media presumed that Molefe had compelled him to resign. In the aftermath of the announcement, a group of ANC members wrote an anonymous open letter attacking Molefe and other members of his cabinet. The letter alleged that Molefe had fired Khasu because he viewed him as a political threat, and claimed that "none of us knew who Popo Molefe was until Jomo Khasu marketed him to us" as a candidate for ANC Provincial Chairperson in 1994.

Ahead of the expiry of his term on the ANC NEC, Khasu was nominated to stand for re-election; he was the fourth-most popular candidate among party branches in the North West. According to the Mail & Guardian, the North West ANC's provincial general council had raised the matter of the ongoing investigation into his expenditure as MEC but had decided that the allegations should not be held against him unless and until he was convicted. When the ANC's 51st National Conference opened in December 2002, Khasu was included on the "preferred" list of nominees, which emerged from horse-trading among provincial leaders, but he was not ultimately elected.

== Later public service ==
In April 2004, Khasu joined the South African diplomatic corps; he served as Ambassador to Gabon. He later returned to South Africa and served as spokesperson for the Minister of Transport, Dipuo Peters.
