= Josiah Jele =

South African politician

Josiah Jele OLS

Permanent Representative of South Africa to the United Nations
- In office 1995–1999
- President: Nelson Mandela
- Preceded by: Vernon Steward
- Succeeded by: Dumisani Kumalo

Member of the National Assembly
- In office May 1994 – February 1995

Personal details
- Born: Josiah Khiphusizi Jele; 1 May 1930 (age 95) Alexandra, Transvaal; Union of South Africa
- Party: African National Congress
- Spouse: Catherine Jele

Josiah Khiphusizi Jele (born 1 May 1930) is a retired South African politician, diplomat, and former anti-apartheid activist who was the first post-apartheid Permanent Representative of South Africa to the United Nations from 1995 to 1999. He is a veteran of the African National Congress (ANC), of which he has been a member since 1950.

Jele went into exile with the ANC in 1965 and represented the party in a variety of capacities, including as its head of international affairs from 1978 to 1982. He was a member of the ANC National Executive Committee for over two decades. After the end of apartheid, Jele served briefly in the National Assembly before President Nelson Mandela appointed him as an ambassador in 1995.

== Early life and anti-apartheid activism ==
Jele was born on 1 May 1930 in Alexandra, a township outside Johannesburg. He joined the ANC in 1950 and remained a member after the organisation was banned by the apartheid government in 1960. After being detained for his activism between 1964 and 1965, he went into exile, joining the ANC at its headquarters abroad. He was stationed with Umkhonto we Sizwe (MK) in Tanzania, where he edited the MK journal, Dawn, while serving as political commissar between 1967 and 1968. During this period, Jele joined the ANC National Executive Committee, onto which he was co-opted in the aftermath of the ANC's 1969 Morogoro conference.

Jele was the ANC's director of broadcasting from 1970 to 1971 and secretary for African affairs at the World Peace Council in Helsinki, Finland from 1970 to 1971. He was stationed at the World Peace Council for five years. He also remained one of the ANC's foremost policy intellectuals and edited two newsletters on global affairs, Focus on Africa and The Peace Courier. In 1978, he returned to ANC headquarters, now in Lusaka, Zambia, in order to head the organisation's Department of International Affairs. He held that position until 1982, when he was succeeded by Johnny Makhathini.

After stepping down as head of international affairs, Jele continued to work for the ANC in Lusaka; he also remained a member of the ANC's National Executive Committee, and gained direct election to the body for the first time at the 1985 Kabwe conference. He was also a member of the politburo of the South African Communist Party (SACP). He succeeded Joe Nhlanhla as head of the secretariat of the ANC's Politico-Military Council from 1987 until 1990, when he returned to South Africa during the negotiations to end apartheid. The following year, at the ANC's 48th National Conference in Durban, he was not directly elected to the ANC National Executive Committee, but he was co-opted as a member for one final term, which ended in 1994.

== Post-apartheid career ==
In the 1994 general election, South Africa's first under universal suffrage, Jele was elected to represent the ANC in the new National Assembly. However, he was already viewed as a likely diplomat-designate, and in February 1995 he was appointed as South Africa's first post-apartheid Permanent Representative to the United Nations. He remained in that position until 1999, and during that time he represented South Africa during stints as vice-president of the United Nations General Assembly and chairperson of the Bureau of Non-Aligned Countries.

Upon returning to South Africa, Jele retired from frontline politics but nonetheless remained active in the ANC. In October 2002, ahead of the ANC's 51st National Conference, Jele and Jabu Moleketi published a controversial paper, Two Strategies of the National Liberation Movement in the Struggle for the Victory of the National Democratic Revolution, which led to a row within the Tripartite Alliance; Jele and Moleketi agreed with incumbent President Thabo Mbeki that an "ultra-left sectarian faction" threatened to undermine the ANC.

In July 2004, Jele was shot by unidentified assailants outside his home in Lombardy West, Johannesburg. The attack was treated as an assassination attempt and was linked to Jele's involvement in the regulation of the South African private security industry; at the time he was chairperson of the Security Officers Board and chairperson of the council of the Private Security Industry Regulatory Authority.

In 2021, the ANC National Executive Committee appointed Jele to an internal panel that was tasked with hearing Ace Magashule's appeal against his suspension from his office as ANC secretary-general.

== Honours ==
On 22 April 2008, President Mbeki awarded Jele the Order of Luthuli in silver for "His excellent contribution to the fight against the apartheid system in South Africa".

== Personal life ==
Jele's wife Catherine Jele, is French–Hungarian; they have children. He also had a son, anti-apartheid activist and diplomat Mpendulo "Squire" Jele (1955–2022), with Simangele Khumalo.
