= Moses Mabhida =

South African politician (1923–1986)

- Born: Moses Mncane Mbheki Mabhida; 11 October 1923; Thornville, Natal, South Africa
- Died: 8 March 1986 (aged 62); Maputo, Mozambique
- Known for: Anti-apartheid activist Trade unionist

Moses Mncane Mbheki Mabhida (11 October 1923 – 8 March 1986) was a South African politician. Mabhida was leader of the South African Communist Party from 1978 until his death in 1986.

== Biography ==
Mabhida was born in Thornville, Natal to a peasant family as the fourth of five children.

Mabhida was drawn to trade unionism by the late Harry Gwala, then an ardent unionist and member of the South African Communist Party. Mabhida, too, joined the Communist Party in 1942. After many unionists were banned in 1952, his colleagues in the newly revived underground party urged Mabhida to undertake full-time union work. In the next decade, he organised scores of workers in Natal. He worked for the South African Railways and Harbours Union and was paid £25 a month – collected from political sympathisers, as the union had little money. He was a central participant in the development of the South African Congress of Trade Unions (SACTU) and was elected a vice-president at its first congress in 1955. He also served as secretary of the African National Congress (ANC) Pietermaritzburg branch in the mid-1950s, and had a close working relationship with Albert Luthuli. Mabhida became a member of the ANC's National Executive Committee in 1956, and in 1958–1959 was acting chair of the Natal ANC.

A week after the Sharpeville massacre in 1960, Mabhida was sent abroad by SACTU to represent the organisation internationally. For the next three years he organised international solidarity activities in Prague with the World Federation of Trade Unions, and with the developing African trade union federations. In 1963, following his re-election to the NEC at the ANC's Lobatse conference in October 1962, he was asked by Oliver Tambo to devote himself to the development of the ANC's armed wing, Umkhonto we Sizwe (MK). Mabhida then underwent military training; as MK commissar he became the chief political instructor of new military recruits, and later served as the commander of MK. Mabhida's repeated re-election to the NEC, his appointment to the Revolutionary Council on its creation in 1969, and later to the Politico-Military Council which replaced it, reflected his popularity among ANC members.

After the Morogoro conference in 1969, he was instrumental in setting up the ANC's Department of National Intelligence and Security. He was elected General Secretary of the Communist Party in November 1979, replacing Moses Kotane who had died the previous year. In the 1980s, Mabhida continued his work with political and logistical planning for MK, based at various times in Lesotho, Mozambique and Swaziland. In 1985, while on a mission to Havana, Mabhida suffered a stroke, and after a year of illness, died of a heart attack in Maputo and was buried there on 29 March 1986.

== Legacy ==
The Moses Mabhida Stadium in Durban is named in his honour.

== See also ==
- Siphiwe Mvuyane – Siphiwe Mvuyane was a South African policeman who was renowned for killing underground MK operatives and ANC people.

Party political offices
Preceded by Moses Kotane	General Secretary of the South African Communist Party; 1978–1984	Succeeded by Joe Slovo
