= Chancellor House (building) =

Building in Johannesburg, South Africa

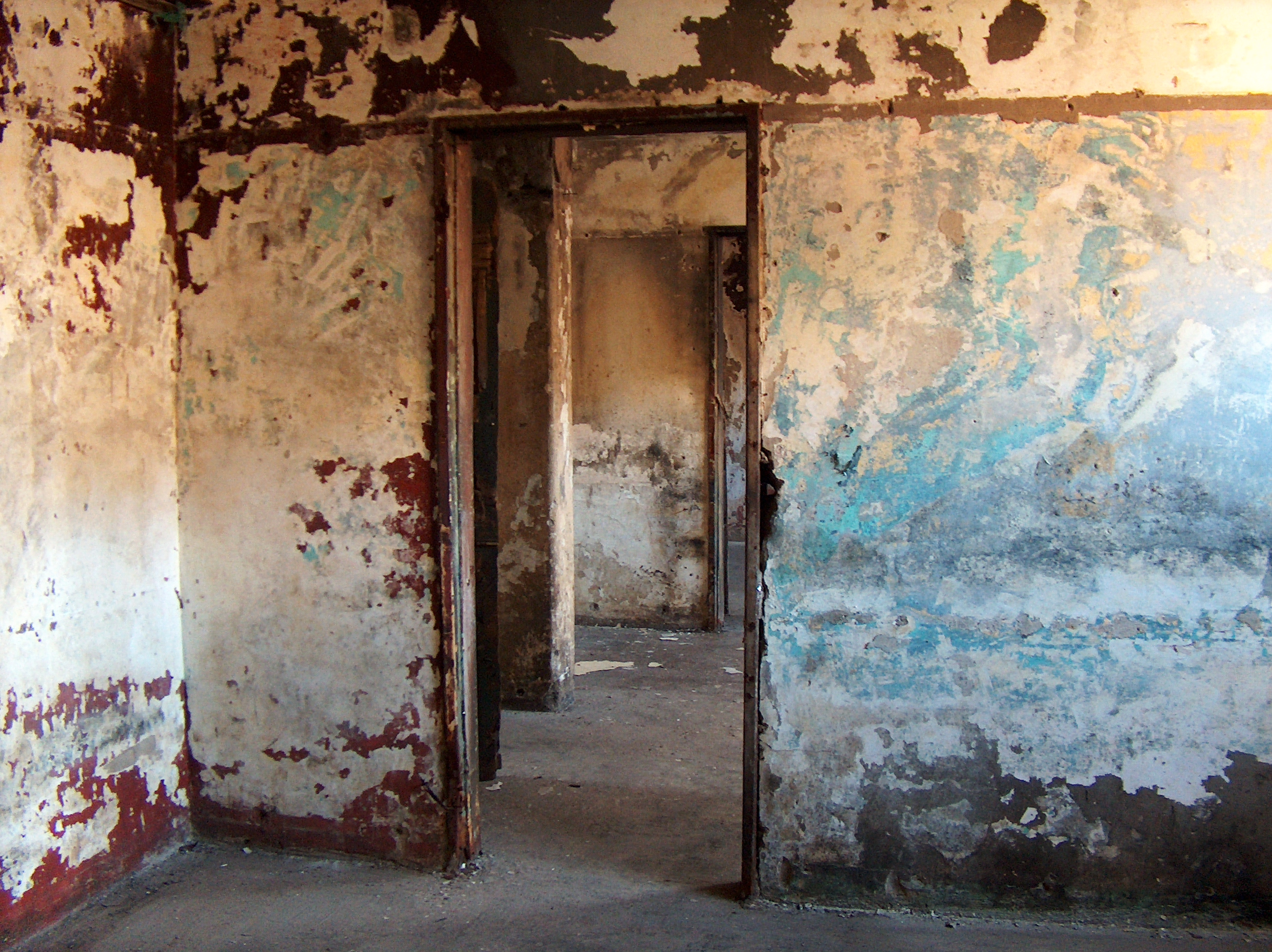
- Chancellor House before renovations
- Interactive map of the Chancellor House area

General information
- Location: 25 Fox Street, Ferreirasdorp, Johannesburg, South Africa
- Coordinates: 26.2066°S 28.0345°E

Chancellor House is a law office building situated at 25 Fox Street, Ferreirasdorp, Johannesburg, that once housed the Mandela and Tambo law firm of Nelson Mandela and Oliver Tambo. It is a provincial heritage site.

The building was due to be bought by the Johannesburg Heritage Trust in 2004 and developed into a tourist destination, with R300 000 earmarked for the construction of a visitor center.

As of 2008, however, no purchase had been consummated and the building reportedly continued to fall into ruin.

Full restoration of the building was completed in May, 2011.
