= Harry Gwala =

South African activist (1920–1995)

- Born: 30 July 1920; New Hanover, Natal Province, South African
- Died: June 20, 1995 (aged 74); Pietermaritzburg, KwaZulu-Natal, South Africa
- Occupations: teacher, trade union organiser, political activist
- Awards: Isitwalandwe Medal (1992)

Themba Harry Gwala (30 July 1920 – 20 June 1995) was an anti-apartheid activist and a leader of the African National Congress (ANC) and South African Communist Party (SACP) in South Africa.

== Biography ==
=== Early career and activism ===
Harry Gwala trained as a teacher at Adams College and taught at Slangspruit where his students included Moses Mabhida. In 1942, Gwala joined the Communist Party of South Africa, and in 1944 joined the ANC, and moved into trade union organisation in the chemical, construction, and rubber industries. He was among the organisers of a national stay-away in 1950, and was subsequently banned under the Suppression of Communism Act.

=== Imprisonment ===
From 1960, Gwala was involved in the ANC underground. In 1964, he was imprisoned on Robben Island for sabotage and recruiting for Umkhonto we Sizwe. He was released in 1972, after eight years, but restricted to Pietermaritzburg by a banning order. There, he established a laundry collection business as a cover for continued ANC activity, and attempts to revive the South African Congress of Trade Unions. In 1975, Gwala was arrested again, this time sentenced to life imprisonment under the Terrorism Act. While on Robben Island, Gwala taught classes to other inmates on political theory. In 1995, Nelson Mandela recalled,

Mphephethwa was a great "political teacher" who taught generation after generation of struggle. Many of today's leaders drank from the deep well of Mphephethwa's political wisdom. But such was the nature of his teaching, that the products of his education, would themselves develop into political giants in their own right; using the tools he gave them to develop independent thought and analysis.

In 1984, his wife Elda died, and he was refused permission to attend her funeral. During his second prison term, Gwala developed a motor neuron disease that resulted in the paralysis of his arms, and eventually led to loss of control in his neck muscles. His declining health was a major factor in his release from prison in November 1988.

=== "Lion of the Midlands" ===
After the unbanning of the ANC in 1990, Gwala was appointed interim ANC Chair for the Natal Midlands, and was officially elected to the position in December. In 1991, he was elected to the National Executive Committee of the African National Congress. During the negotiations of the 1990s, Gwala rejected rapprochement with the Inkatha Freedom Party, putting him at odds with the national ANC leadership. He warned ANC negotiators that they "should not reconcile the oppressed to neo-apartheid dressed in the robes of a new constitution." His uncompromising stance and firebrand oratory made him popular with the movement's footsoldiers, among whom he was known as the "Lion of the Midlands".

He was seen by his detractors as a warlord because of his incitement of violence in the conflict between the ANC and the Inkatha Freedom Party in the KwaZulu-Natal Midlands. The Truth and Reconciliation Commission found that Gwala "functioned as a self-styled ANC warlord", and that, "in calling for the killing of persons opposed to the ANC, Gwala incited his supporters to commit gross violations of human rights".

In the 1994 elections, Gwala was elected to the KwaZulu-Natal Legislature, where he served as the Chief Whip for the ANC. The same year, he was nominated to the Central Committee of the South African Communist Party. However, in June, his party membership was suspended for six months for "breaching SACP internal party discipline" in his repeated criticisms of party colleagues, and for refusing to submit himself to an internal investigation into his alleged involvement in violence against fellow party members.

Gwala died in June 1995 in hospital after suffering a heart attack.
