= Vernon Nkadimeng =

Member of the African National Congress who was killed while in exile

Vernon Nkadimeng (25 June 1958 in Alexandra – 21 May 1985 in Gaborone, Botswana) was a member of the African National Congress who was killed while in exile in Botswana by the Western Transvaal branch of the South African State Intelligence Agency.

== Life ==
Vernon Nkadimeng was born to ANC activist and trade unionist John Nkadimeng.

He fled South Africa following the 1976 Soweto uprising at the age of 18. He entered the Umkhonto We Sizwe (MK) in Angola, the armed wing of the ANC, and soon rose through the military structures of the MK after extensive military training. He further traveled to Czechoslovakia with the MK, where he received specialised political training. After this, Nkadimeng was deployed to the South African Congress of Trade Unions (SACTU) underground machinery in Botswana, assuming the codename Rogers Mevi. Before dawn on 21 May 1985, Nkadimeng was killed, along with other MK members, by a car bomb placed by the South African Defence Force. He was 27 years old.

Nkadimeng was buried in Gaborone Cemetery, Botswana, before being exhumed and repatriated to South Africa on 13 January 2006. A formal funeral was held on 28 January 2006, attended by his father, South Africa High Commissioner to Botswana Eunice Komane, and other South African nationals living in Botswana. He is now buried at the Westpark Cemetery in Johannesburg, South Africa.
