= Mendi Msimang =

African National Congress treasurer

Mendi Msimang OMSS

Treasurer of the African National Congress
- In office December 1997 – December 2007
- President: Thabo Mbeki
- Preceded by: Arnold Stofile
- Succeeded by: Mathews Phosa

Personal details
- Born: Meinrad Mendi Themba Boyi Msimang; 8 December 1928 Marshalltown, Johannesburg; Union of South Africa
- Died: 3 December 2018 (aged 89)
- Party: African National Congress
- Spouse: Manto Tshabalala-Msimang (d. 2009)
- Relations: Shaka Sisulu (grandson)
- Children: Fabian Msimang

Meinrad Mendi Themba Boyi Msimang OMSS (8 December 1928 – 3 December 2018) was a South African anti-apartheid activist and politician. He served in the first post-apartheid National Assembly from 1994 to 1995 and was the national treasurer-general of the African National Congress (ANC) between December 1997 and December 2007.

Msimang was also the South African High Commissioner to the United Kingdom from 1995 to 1997. During apartheid, he had been the ANC's chief representative in the United Kingdom from 1985 to 1994.

== Early life and anti-apartheid activism ==
The second of seven siblings, Msimang was born on 8 December 1928 in Marshalltown outside Johannesburg. He was named after the SS Mendi, which sank in 1917 while ferrying black South African volunteer troops to the First World War. In his youth, his family was forcibly removed to Sophiatown and then to the Western Native Township. He was raised Christian and attended the Maria Ratschitz School in Wasbank, Natal, not far from his grandmother's home in Weenen.

Msimang was from a political family: an earlier generation of his family, including Richard W. Msimang and H. Selby Msimang, had been involved in establishing the African National Congress (ANC) in 1912. As a teenager in the Western Native Township in the 1940s, Msimang fell in with a circle of ANC-aligned youth and became involved in political mobilisation, including campaigns against forced removals. However, his family sent him to Mariannhill to complete his schooling at Mariannhill High School. Then, between 1951 and 1953, Msimang attended Pius XII College in Lesotho, where he met his future colleague Thomas Nkobi; he studied for, but did not complete, a Bachelor of Arts. He withdrew from the degree to resume his political activism in South Africa, though he later worked at an article clerk at the law offices of Mandela and Tambo. He also served as secretary to Walter Sisulu.

After the apartheid government banned the ANC in 1960, Msimang followed much of the ANC leadership into exile outside the country. He left South Africa through Botswana for Tanzania, where he helped to establish the ANC's first external mission. During that time he also served on the National Executive Committee of the exiled ANC. In 1968, he was appointed as the ANC's chief representative in India. Upon his return to Tanzania, he was a coordinator in the ANC's education department, a position which involved liaising with UNESCO, organising international scholarships for ANC cadres, and planning for the establishment of the Solomon Mahlangu Freedom College. Thereafter he spent a stint at the ANC's headquarters in exile in Lusaka, Zambia.

From 1985 to 1994, Msimang was the ANC's chief representative in the United Kingdom. He lived in London until South Africa's first democratic elections in April 1994. During that period, in 1990, the ANC was unbanned inside South Africa during the negotiations to end apartheid, allowing the ANC to openly hold its 48th National Conference in Durban in December 1991; the conference elected Msimang as a member of the ANC National Executive Committee.

== Post-apartheid political career ==
In the April 1994 election, Msimang was represented to elect the ANC in the National Assembly, the lower house of the new South African Parliament. After just a year in Parliament, he resigned from his seat in 1995 when President Nelson Mandela asked him to return to London as South African High Commissioner to the United Kingdom. However, in October 1997, it was announced that Cheryl Carolus would replace Msimang in that post so that he could run for a position in the ANC's internal leadership.

Thus Msimang attended the ANC's 50th National Conference in Mafikeng in December 1997, where he was elected unopposed to succeed Arnold Stofile as the party's national treasurer-general. Msimang had not been re-elected to the ANC National Executive at the last party conference in December 1994, but, according to Mark Gevisser, he was hand-picked for the treasury role by Thabo Mbeki, who was elected as ANC president at the same conference. Mbeki and Msimang were personally close; Msimang and Adelaide Tambo had stood in loco parentis at Mbeki's wedding in exile in 1974.

Msimang served in the ANC treasurer-general position for a decade, the full duration of Mbeki's tenure in the ANC presidency; he was re-elected unopposed at the 51st National Conference in December 2002. At the next conference in Polokwane in December 2007, he did not stand for re-election to a third term and he was succeeded by Mathews Phosa.

In his retirement, Msimang was appointed as a member of the ANC's internal Integrity Commission when it was constituted for the first time in 2013 under the chairmanship of Andrew Mlangeni.

== Honours ==
In 1999, Msimang was inducted into the Order for Meritorious Service, Class II, Silver.

== Personal life ==
He was the second husband of Manto Tshabalala-Msimang, the Minister of Health in Mbeki's government, until her death in December 2009. Fabian Msimang, who served as chief of the post-apartheid South African Air Force, is his son. One of his grandchildren is media personality Shaka Sisulu, born in 1979 to his daughter Makhosazana and ANC activist Max Sisulu. His other relatives include Herbert Qedusizi Msimang, who was Judge President of the KwaZulu-Natal High Court.

After a period of illness, Msimang died on 3 December 2018. President Cyril Ramaphosa spoke at his official funeral in Tshwane.
