= Lindiwe Mabuza =

South African politician (1938–2021)

South African High Commissioner to the United Kingdom
- In office 2001–2009
- President: Thabo Mbeki; Kgalema Motlanthe
- Preceded by: Cheryl Carolus
- Succeeded by: Zola Skweyiya

Personal details
- Born: 13 August 1938 Newcastle, Natal, South Africa
- Died: 6 December 2021 (aged 83) South Africa
- Party: African National Congress
- Children: Thembelihle Msibi
- Education: Stanford University; University of Minnesota
- Occupation: Politician, diplomat, poet, academic, journalist, activist

Lindiwe Mabuza (13 August 1938 – 6 December 2021) was a South African politician, diplomat, poet, academic, journalist, and cultural activist. She was an anti-apartheid activist who went on to serve her country as a member of the first democratically elected parliament of South Africa. She then proceeded to a career as a distinguished diplomat. She served on the Advisory Board of Elders of the Ifa Lethu Foundation, which repatriates South African artworks. She was a patron of Dramatic Need, a United Kingdom–based charity that promotes creative arts for children, and was an advisory Council Member of the Thabo Mbeki Foundation. Mabuza also served as the chairperson of the Nelson Mandela Children's Fund UK.

== Early life and career ==
Mabuza was born in Newcastle, KwaZulu-Natal, in South Africa. She completed her high school at St Louis Betrand High School in Newcastle. She then went on to attend Roma College in Lesotho and obtained a Bachelor of Arts degree. Owing to her struggle to find employment in apartheid South Africa, Mabuza moved to Swaziland and became a teacher of English and Zulu.

In 1964, she moved to the United States and enrolled at Stanford University, where she completed a master's degree in English. She went further to obtain her second master's degree in history, majoring in American Studies, from the University of Minnesota. In 1968, she became a lecturer in the Department of Sociology at the University of Minnesota. In 1969, she joined Ohio University as an assistant professor, teaching literature, history and studies of international racism and injustice for eight years.

Mabuza's personal experience of racial segregation in South Africa, which led her to leave South Africa, and her exposure to the plight of African Americans in the Civil Rights Movement prompted Mabuza to join the struggle for the emancipation of her people in South Africa and Africa as a whole. In 1975, she joined the African National Congress (ANC) and moved to Lusaka in Zambia. In 1977, she became Editor of Voice of Women, a feminist journal for women in the ANC. She was also a radio journalist and broadcaster in Radio Freedom, which was the ANC's radio station, broadcasting from Zambia to multiple African countries. She was also the Chairperson of the ANC's Cultural Committee.

In 1979, the then ANC president Oliver Reginald Tambo assigned Mabuza to open ANC offices in Scandinavia and to become the ANC's Chief Representative to Scandinavian countries, residing in Stockholm, Sweden. Tambo reflected later in his speech to the ANC's women section in 1981 in Angola that "Comrade Lindiwe Mabuza cried and sobbed and ultimately collapsed on top of herself when she learnt she had been appointed ANC Chief Representative to the Scandinavian countries. But, looking at the record, could any man have done better?"

During her time in Sweden, where she was based until 1987, she mobilised support for the ANC and raised funds for ANC work across the world, especially for exiled South Africans in Zambia. She also led campaigns and lobbied towards the isolation of South Africa through trade bans and boycotts. She forged strong relationships with Scandinavians and was very close to the Prime minister of Sweden, Olof Palme, who was a major supporter of the ANC and resistance to the apartheid government. She had become such a formidable force against the apartheid government that on Monday, 8 September 1986, the ANC office was bombed with the hope of killing her and sabotaging the work she was doing. By the time Mabuza left Scandinavia, she had been so successful that the international offices of the ANC that she managed had grown to include Denmark (opened in 1985), Norway (1986), and Finland (1987).

Mabuza was subsequently transferred from Sweden to the United States to become the ANC's Chief Representative there, serving in that role from 1989 until 1994. With the aid of the Swedes, Mabuza managed to open and run an office based in Washington, DC. She arrived in America shortly after the American government had imposed sanctions on apartheid South Africa. In 1993, during her tenure in Washington, she also obtained a diploma in diplomacy from the Institute for Diplomacy and Foreign Relations in Kuala Lumpur, Malaysia. She continued to lobby congress and to work with many American activists, such as Jesse Jackson, Harry Belafonte, Jane Fonda and many others. Mabuza was instrumental in the many boycotts, rallies and other efforts to frustrate the apartheid government. Her efforts, with the help of other organizations and American colleges across America, led to Coca-Cola and many other such corporations withdrawing their investments from South Africa. Later, after the political prisoners from Robben Island were released, including Nelson Mandela, Mabuza was key in organising Mandela's first visit to America after his release.

== In democratic South Africa ==
Although Lindiwe Mabuza had spent many years in political exile, she was nominated into the first democratic parliament of South Africa serving under president Mandela. Her passion was still diplomacy and her party, now the new ANC government, knew this. She was then appointed South African Ambassador to Germany in 1995. She was a celebrated diplomat in Germany because of her own efforts in human rights. A reception was held in her honour to mark her signing of the Goldenes Buch in Bremen City Hall, an honour reserved only for heads of state. She also accompanied the German Chancellor Helmut Kohl on a major trade visit to South Africa. In 1999, she became South African High Commissioner to Malaysia and Brunei, with cross-accreditation to the Philippines as non-resident Ambassador.

In 2001, Mabuza took over from Cheryl Carolus as South African High Commissioner to the United Kingdom and the Republic of Ireland, a post she held till 2009. In recognition of her commitment to strengthening ties between the UK and South Africa, she received the "Diplomat of the year from Africa award" from The Diplomat magazine in 2009.

Mabuza died at her home on 6 December 2021, aged 83, having been suffering from cancer.

== Poetry and writings ==
Mabuza started writing poetry when she was involved in "The Way Project" in the United States that tried to create programmes through which children can be kept off the streets. When she arrived in Zambia, she soon discovered that ANC women did not have a voice so she co-edited (as "Sono Molefe") an anthology of poems by ANC women titled Malibongwe! ANC Women: Poetry Is Also Their Weapon in 1981 (reissued in 2020). Mabuza's poems also appear in Anta Sudan Katara Mberi and Cosmo Pieterse's anthology Speak Easy, Speak Free (1977) and her poetry is included in Barry Feinberg's anthology Poets to the People: South African Freedom Poem (1980) and in The Heinemann Book of African Women's Poetry (1995).

Her own collections are Letter to Letta, 1991, which she titled after her dear friend the musician Letta Mbulu, Voices that Lead: Poems 1976–1996, Footprints and fingerprints, published in 2008, and To Sweden from ANC, published in 1987.

In 2007, she published a children's book titled South African Animals, with illustrations by Alan Baker.

Mabuza also co-edited (with Pallo Jordan) the book Oliver Tambo Remembered, in honour of her mentor and friend Oliver Tambo. The book is a collection of essays by Tambo's friends and comrades. She also conceived the idea to compile a collection of essays on former South African President Thabo Mbeki, an idea leading to the bestseller titled The Thabo Mbeki I Know. Inspired by the 100th anniversary of Tambo's birth, she edited the volume Conversations with Uncle O. R. Tambo: Childhood Memories in Exile, a collection of letters by writers who were children at the time when Tambo was president of the ANC.

== Awards and honours ==
- Mabuza was awarded the degree Doctor of Philosophy (Honoris Causa) in 1993 by the University of Durban-Westville in South Africa.
- In 1997, at New York University, she was awarded the Yari Yari Award for her contribution to Human Rights and Literature.
- In 2003, she received an Honorary Doctorate from the University of Edinburgh in Scotland.
- In 2003, while serving as South African High Commissioner to the United Kingdom and the Republic of Ireland, she was named by Diplomat Magazine as Diplomat of the Year.
- In 2014, President Jacob Zuma awarded her South Africa's highest decoration, the national Order of Ikhamanga, for her contribution to the eradication of the oppressive apartheid system through the arts.
- In 2017, Mabuza received the Lifetime Achievement Award for Arts Advocacy. This award was granted to her by the Arts and Culture Trust of South Africa.

== Bibliography ==
- (Editor) Malibongwe! ANC Women: Poetry Is Also Their Weapon, 1981
- To Sweden from ANC (poetry), 1987
- (Editor) One Never Knows: An Anthology of Black South African Women Writers in Exile, Skotaville Publishers, 1989, ISBN 9780947009656
- Letter to Letta, Skotaville Publishers, 1991
- Voices that Lead: Poems 1976–1996, Vivlia, 1998, ISBN 9781868670697
- Africa To Me, Hammer, 1999, ISBN 978-3872948076
- South African Animals (for children), illustrated by Alan Baker, 2007
- Footprints and Fingerprints, Picador Africa, 2008 ISBN 9781770100787
- (Editor) Conversations with Uncle O. R. Tambo: Childhood Memories in Exile, 2018
