= Reggie September =

Reggie September OLS (13 June 1923 - 22 November 2013) was a South African politician, trade-unionist, Member of Parliament and executive committee member of the African National Congress (ANC).

== Life ==
September was born in Cape Town in 1923 to a working-class family. He graduated from Trafalgar High School before gaining employment as apprentice in the shoe industry, and becoming a trade unionist. He joined the National Liberation League, founded by Cissie Gool, before becoming a founder member of the South African Coloured People's Organisation in 1953 (later known as the South African Coloured People's Congress).

In 1960, the South African government detained him for five months without charge, and he was repeatedly harassed and detained after that as the apartheid government cracked down on internal resistance. He fled the country in 1963 and served as the African National Congress' Chief Representative for the United Kingdom and Western Europe until 1978, and as member of the ANC's Revolutionary Council in Lusaka.

He returned to South Africa in 1991 after the unbanning of the ANC, and was elected as a member of parliament in 1994 in South Africa's first democratic elections.

He retired in 2004, and died on 22 November 2013 at the age of 90. He was survived by his second wife, Melissa Steyn.
