= Thozamile Botha =

South African politician

Thozamile Botha (born 16 June 1948) is a South African politician. He started his political career as a trade unionist and was an executive member of the Congress of South African Trade Unions. Due to the apartheid government he went into exile in 1980 to Lesotho where he worked with Chris Hani. He later moved to Lusaka, Zambia before completing a master's degree in political science and public administration at the University of Essex. He returned to South Africa when the African National Congress was unbanned in 1990 and was elected head of the ANC's Department of Local and Regional Government.
