= Johnny Makatini =

Anti-apartheid activist (1932–1988)

Johnny Makatini OLS
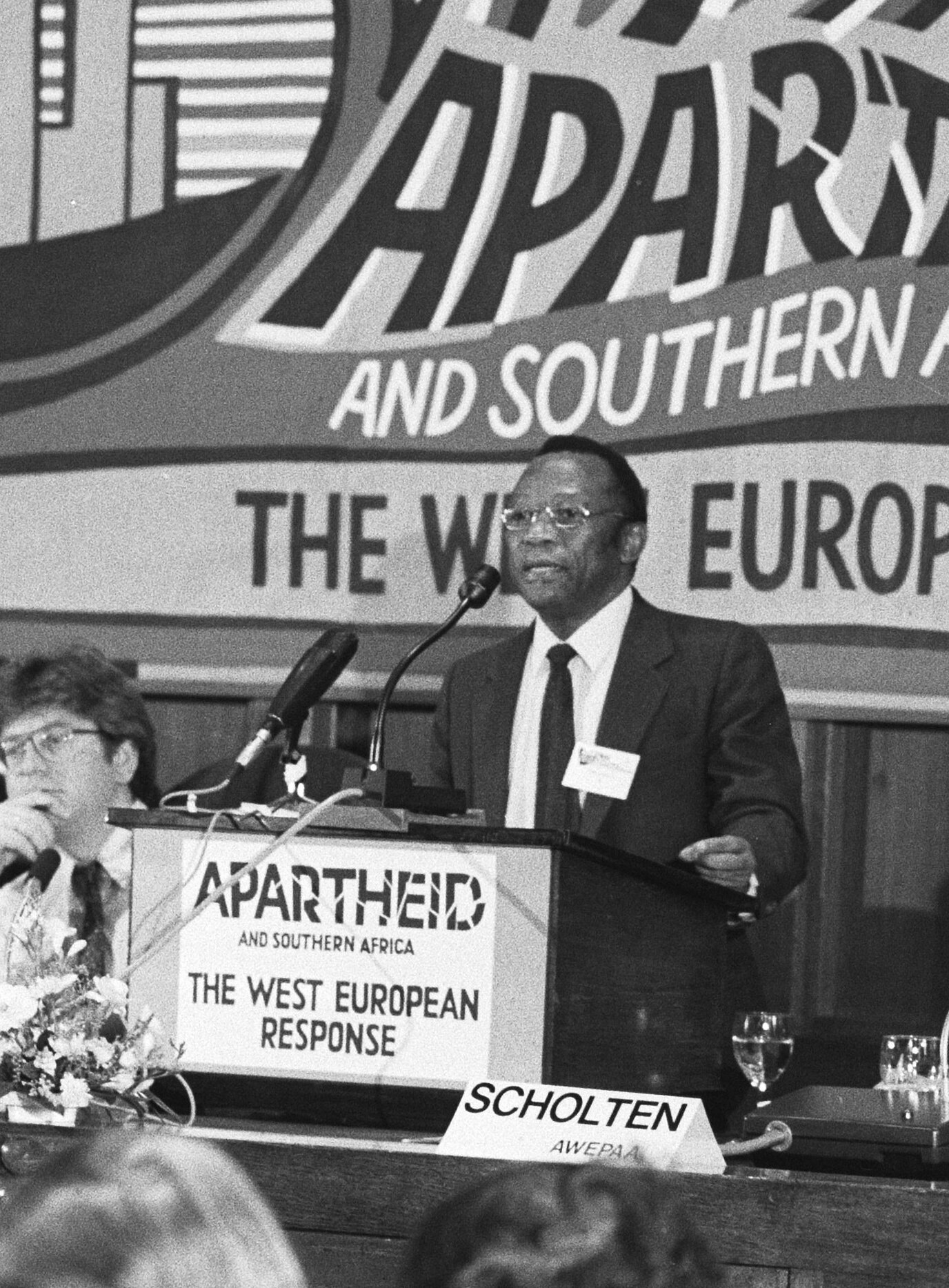
- Makatini at a conference in September 1985
- Born: Johnstone Mfanafuthi Makatini; 8 February 1932; Durban, Natal Province; Union of South Africa
- Died: 3 December 1988 (aged 56); Lusaka, Zambia
- Political party: African National Congress

Johnstone Mfanafuthi Makatini (8 February 1932 – 3 December 1988), also spelled Makathini or Makhathini, was a South African politician and anti-apartheid activist. A longstanding diplomatic representative for the African National Congress (ANC), he was the head of the ANC's Department of International Affairs from 1983 until his death in exile in 1988.

Makatini was born in Natal Province, where he trained as a teacher, but he went into exile with the ANC in 1962. Before he took office as director of international affairs, he represented the ANC in Algeria from 1964 to 1975 and at the United Nations in New York from 1977 to 1982. He was also a member of the ANC National Executive Committee from 1963 to 1988.

== Early life and activism ==
Makatini was born on 8 February 1932 in Durban in the former Natal Province. He attended Adams College and trained as a teacher in Inanda. As a teacher, he was active in activism against the Bantu Education Act, imposed in 1953 by the apartheid government, and he ultimately resigned from the profession to study law part-time at the University of Natal. During this period, he was a youth organiser for the African National Congress (ANC) in Durban and surrounding rural areas.

== Activism in exile ==
In 1962, Makatini was among the first group of Natal activists who volunteered to join the ANC's exile mission and receive military training with Umkhonto we Sizwe. After his training, he remained at the exile mission to receive subsequent groups of recruits, and in 1963, he was elected to the ANC's National Executive Committee for the first time.

From 1964 to 1975, he represented the ANC at its office in newly independent Algeria; he worked under Robert Resha until 1966, when he succeeded Resha as the ANC's chief representative in Algeria. Under Makatini, the Algerian mission – one of the ANC's most active – expanded to include activities in France and other European countries. Then, from 1977 to 1982, Makatini was the ANC's chief representative at United Nations Headquarters in New York. In that position, he was particularly successful at expanding the ANC's contacts with African Americans and the American anti-apartheid movement.

In 1983, he succeeded Josiah Jele as the head of the ANC's Department of International Affairs. During Makatini's tenure, the ANC opened nine new exile missions abroad, including one in Moscow in 1987. According to Thabo Mbeki's biographer, Mark Gevisser, Makatini was Mbeki's "closest ally" in the ANC; Mbeki was an aide to ANC president Oliver Tambo and ultimately succeeded Makatini as director of international affairs. Makatini remained in the office until his death in 1988; he was also a member of the National Executive Committee until his death.

== Death and honours ==
On 29 November 1988, Makatini was hospitalised in Lusaka, Zambia, where he worked at the ANC's headquarters. Suffering complications from diabetes, he died on 3 December 1988. In April 2007, he was posthumously awarded the Order of Luthuli in silver by Thabo Mbeki, the second post-apartheid president, for "His excellent contribution to the cause of freedom". In 2010, his remains were repatriated to South Africa, and President Jacob Zuma spoke at his reburial.

== Personal life ==
He married Valerie O'Conner Makatini, a Jamaican student at Howard University whom he met at the airport in Washington D.C. while he was stationed in New York. They had one daughter, named Nandi.
