= John Taolo Gaetsewe =

South African trade unionist (died 1988)

- Occupation: Trade unionists

John Taolo Gaetsewe was born in the village of Maruping in Ga-Segonyana Local Municipality.

He was active in the African National Union of Laundry and Dry Cleaning Workers

He was the last elected General Secretary of the South African Congress of Trade Unions. He went to London after he was banned where he worked with Archie Sibeko and others. He relaunched the SACTU journal, Workers` Unity from London.

He died in Botswana in December 1988.

In his honour the Kgalagadi District Municipality was renamed the JohnTaolo Gaetsewe District Municipality in 2008.
