= John Nkadimeng =

South African politician and activist (1927–2020)

John Kgwana Nkadimeng (12 June 1927 – 6 August 2020) was a South African politician, anti-apartheid activist and South African ambassador in Cuba. Nkadimeng was awarded the Order of Luthuli in 2003 by President Thabo Mbeki and Isitwalandwe in 2019 by President Cyril Ramaphosa.

== Background and career ==
John Kgwana Nkadimeng was born on 12 June 1927 Sekhukhuneland in the rural eastern Transvaal Province (now called Limpopo Province in South Africa). After completing primary school he worked as a domestic worker in Germiston (Gauteng Province) where he remained for about a year. He returned home in 1945 and in 1946 was employed in a hat factory in Johannesburg. He again returned to Sekhukhuniland and early in 1947 went back to Johannesburg to work in a tobacco factory.

Whilst employed in the tobacco factory, Nkadimeng joined the African Tobacco Workers' Union, becoming a shop steward in 1949. Following a strike in 1950, he lost his job. During the 1952 Defiance Campaign he was arrested and detained for a month. He was charged with conspiracy and attempting to overthrow the state by violence, but the charges were dropped and he was released.

== Political life ==
Nkadimeng subsequently became a full-time organiser for the Transvaal Council of Non-European Trade Unions. Whilst he was working for the council, it joined the South African Congress of Trade Unions (SACTU), which was formed in March 1955. Nkadimeng served on SACTU's 19-person executive committee and in October was requested to work full-time for the Transvaal Iron, Steel and Metal Workers' Union, which SACTU regarded as covering a strategic industry.

Nkadimeng joined the African National Congress (ANC) in 1950 through the influence of his close friend, Flag Boshielo. He was appointed to the ANC national executive committee in December 1955 at its congress in Bloemfontein, and in 1956 he was one of 156 Congress activists accused of treason. He remained a defendant throughout the lengthy trial until his acquittal in 1961. During the trial, Nkadimeng moved from the Jeppe men's hostel to live in Alexandra Township where he remained until 1961. During this time he and his wife struggled to maintain their family and lived in very difficult circumstances.

On 4 May 1961, Nkadimeng, who had retained strong connections with his people in Sekhukhuneland and had been refused permission to visit his mother there, was arrested for entering the proclaimed area without a permit. He was detained until 1 July, convicted and fined £25.

Nkadimeng assisted the Human rights Welfare Committee, established to make contact with banished people throughout South Africa and to find those banished after the Sekhukhune trial in the late 1950s.

On 24 June 1963 Nkadimeng was detained as a suspected saboteur and held at Fordsburg police station under 90-day legislation. He was charged with others who had attempted to leave the country and it was Nkadimeng's belief that this was an attempt to obtain information from him regarding the whereabouts of Walter Sisulu. He was later detained at Erasmia where, despite the fact that it was winter, he was held in freezing conditions and denied a coat or blankets. Nkadimeng refused to speak to a visiting magistrate, maintaining that he had an insulting manner, so the chief magistrate of Pretoria came to see him in detention. Nkadimeng remembers that when he was put in the sun to warm up, his frozen skin began to crack. He was then moved to prison in Pretoria.

Sabotage charges against Nkadimeng were dropped but he was charged with furthering the aims of an unlawful organisation. He was convicted in May 1964, served his sentence at a prison in the Orange Free State and was released in 1966.

Whilst in detention in Fordsburg in 1963, Nkadimeng was issued with a banning order, which remained in effect when he came out of prison. He was restricted to the area of Orlando West, Johannesburg. He remained under banning orders until he fled the country on 24 July 1976; a month after the Soweto uprising began.

Nkadimeng went to Swaziland where he worked for the ANC for two years. He moved to Mozambique where he was chairman of the senior structure of the ANC in the country. He rejoined the ANC national executive committee and served as chairman of its political committee until he became general secretary of SACTU on 17 August 1983. He continued to serve on the ANC's political and military council. As SACTU's general secretary, Nkadimeng propagated the formation of one central federation of trade unions in South Africa, and called on unions to unite in the Congress of South African Trade Unions (COSATU).

When the South African Communist Party was relaunched as a legal body on 29 July 1990, it was announced that Nkadimeng was a member of its central committee, and he was also named as part of the party's 22-person interim leadership group. He was appointed South African Ambassador to the People's Republic of Cuba in August 1995 by Nelson Mandela.

In 2019 the ANC bestowed an Isithwalandwe/Seaparankwe award upon Nkadimeng for his role in fighting apartheid. Prior to this, in 2013, the Government of South Africa conferred the Order of Luthuli in Gold on Nkadimeng for dedicating his adult life to the struggle for liberation, workers’ rights and for the formation of a united federation of trade unions.

== Death ==
He died on 6 August 2020 and he was given a special state funeral on 14 August 2020 and he was buried at Westpark Cemetery, where his son Vernon Nkadimeng was reburied in 2006.
