= Zola Skweyiya =

South African politician (1942–2018)

Zola Sidney Themba Skweyiya
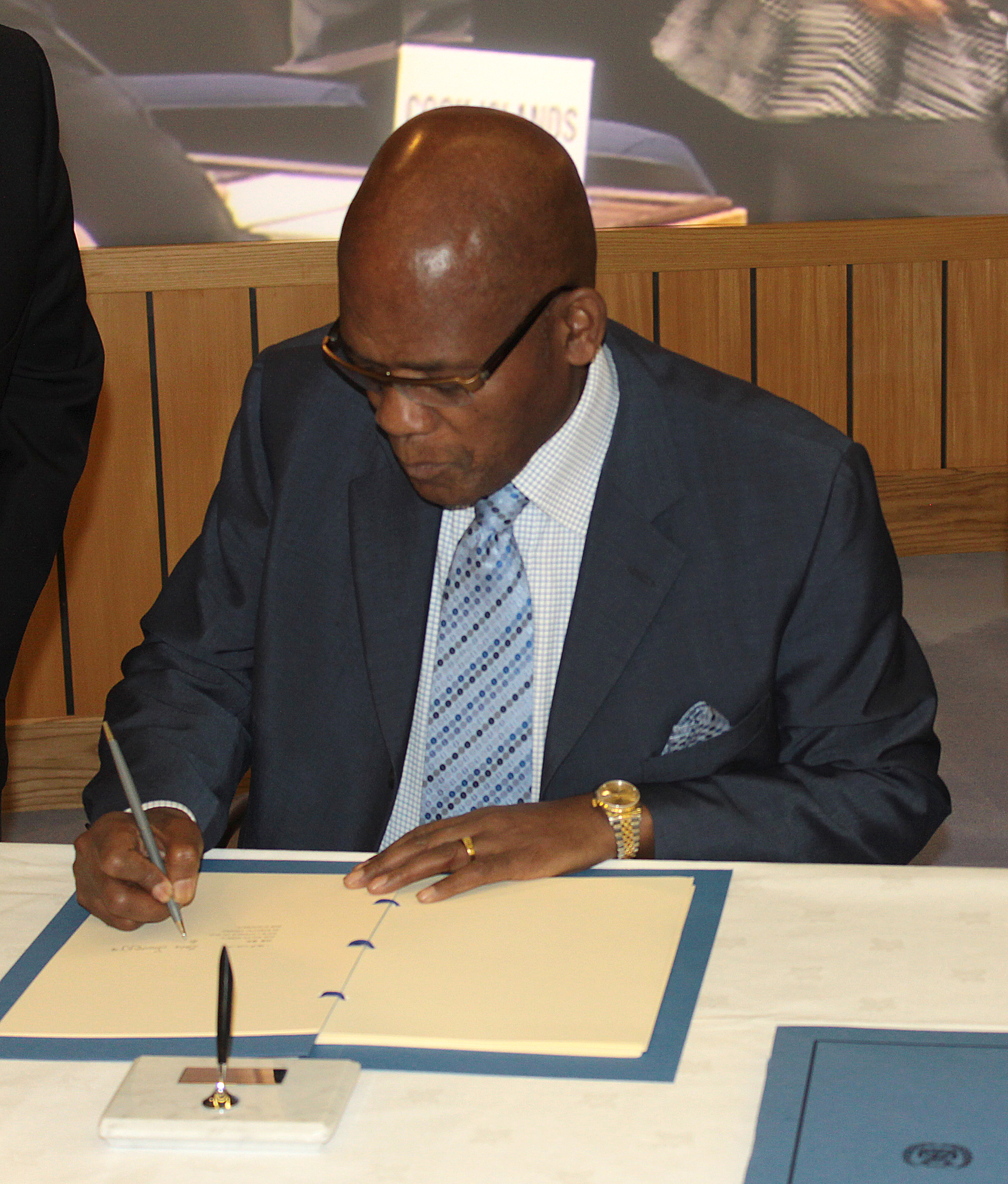

South African High Commissioner to the United Kingdom
- In office September 2009 – February 2014
- President: Jacob Zuma
- Preceded by: Lindiwe Mabuza
- Succeeded by: Obed Mlaba

Minister of Social Development
- In office 1999–2009
- President: Thabo Mbeki
- Succeeded by: Edna Molewa

Minister of Public Service and Administration
- In office 1994–1999
- President: Nelson Mandela
- Succeeded by: Geraldine Fraser-Moleketi

Personal details
- Born: 14 April 1942 Simon's Town, South Africa
- Died: 11 April 2018 (aged 75) Pretoria, South Africa
- Party: African National Congress

Zola Sidney Themba Skweyiya OLS (14 April 1942 – 11 April 2018) was a South African politician who was Minister of Public Service and Administration from 1994 to 1999 and Minister of Social Development from 1999 to 2009. Skweyiya was re-elected to the National Executive Committee of the African National Congress in 2007.

== Early life ==
He was born in Simon's Town, Western Cape, in 1942. He is the young brother of Thembile Skweyiya. He completed high school in Alice, Eastern Cape, at Lovedale College. His political activity began then, when he involved himself in protest against changes to Bantu education. After high school, he attended Fort Hare University and became active with the African National Congress (ANC). When the ANC declared the beginnings of the armed struggle in 1961, he became part of its armed wing, Umkhonto we Sizwe (MK). He left South Africa in 1963, joining the ANC in exile in Tanzania and Zambia. He furthered his education in East Germany, where he studied law from 1969, and obtained a PhD ten years later.

== In-exile ==
Until 1985, Skweyiya was the ANC's representative at the Organisation of African Unity (OAU), before being recalled to Lusaka to set up the ANC's Legal and Constitutional Department. In 1986, he was deputy chair of the ANC's constitutional committee with members such as Jack Simons, Kader Asmal and Albie Sachs. This committee developed the ANC constitutional guidelines that would eventually be used after the ANC's unbanning in 1990, during negotiations that would lead to the first elections in which citizens of all races voted in 1994 and a South African Constitution. During 1986, and until 1988, he attempted to investigate the conditions of detention of ANC members by the ANC security wing of the Department of National Intelligence and Security.

== Services ==
After his return from exile in 1990, he directed the Department of Legal and Constitutional Affairs. He helped to set up the Centre for Development Studies and the South African Legal Defence Fund, both at the University of the Western Cape. Skweyiya also served on the board of trustees of the National Commission for the Rights of Children. He was also elected as president of UNESCO's Management of Social Transformations.

Skweyiya was first elected to Parliament in 1994, and he joined the Cabinet as Minister of Public Service and Administration in the same year. He was moved to the position of Minister of Social Development under President Thabo Mbeki in 1999. Skweyiya is credited with the creation of the South African Social Security Agency, launched on 1 April 2006, aiming to address corruption and maladministration in the social grants payments system.

After 15 years in the Cabinet and Parliament, his retirement from both was announced on 6 May 2009, following the April 2009 general election. As a result, he was not sworn in for the new parliamentary term. He did not leave politics altogether, however; he remained a member of the ANC National Executive Committee, and on 7 May 2009 the party announced that he would have a new post working at the ANC Presidency. According to ANC Secretary-General Gwede Mantashe, Skweyiya voluntarily chose to leave parliamentary politics, "contrary to current speculative and surreptitious commentary". He praised Skweyiya's "immense skill and expertise" and said that the ANC still wanted to make use of his abilities.

Skweyiya was appointed by President Jacob Zuma as the South African High Commissioner to the United Kingdom in September 2009.

From 2011 to 2015, an annual Zola Skweyiya Lecture series was hosted by the Centre for the Analysis of South African Social Policy (CASASP) at the University of Oxford, with the inaugural lecture being given by Dr Skweyiya himself.

== Death ==
Skweyiya died at a Pretoria hospital on 11 April 2018, at the age of 75, leaving behind his second wife, Thuthukile, and two stepchildren, a son, Vuyo, from his first marriage and his grandchildren, Sthembiso and Nanziwe Skweyiya .
