= Smuts Ngonyama =

South African politician (born 1952)

Lulama Smuts Ngonyama (born 22 August 1952) is a South African diplomat who previously served as South Africa’s Ambassador to Spain and currently to Japan, and a former head of communications for the African National Congress (ANC) in South Africa. He was born in Uitenhage, attended school in Fort Beaufort and graduated from the University of Fort Hare.

Following the removal of President Thabo Mbeki from the presidency in 2008, Ngonyama announced his resignation from the ANC to join the Congress of the People (COPE) breakaway party led by Mosiuoa Lekota and Mbhazima Shilowa.

Ngonyama was Spokesperson and Public Secretary of COPE. However, on 25 April 2014 Ngonyama resigned from COPE, citing the directionless nature of the movement.
