= Cheryl Carolus =

South African politician (born 1958)

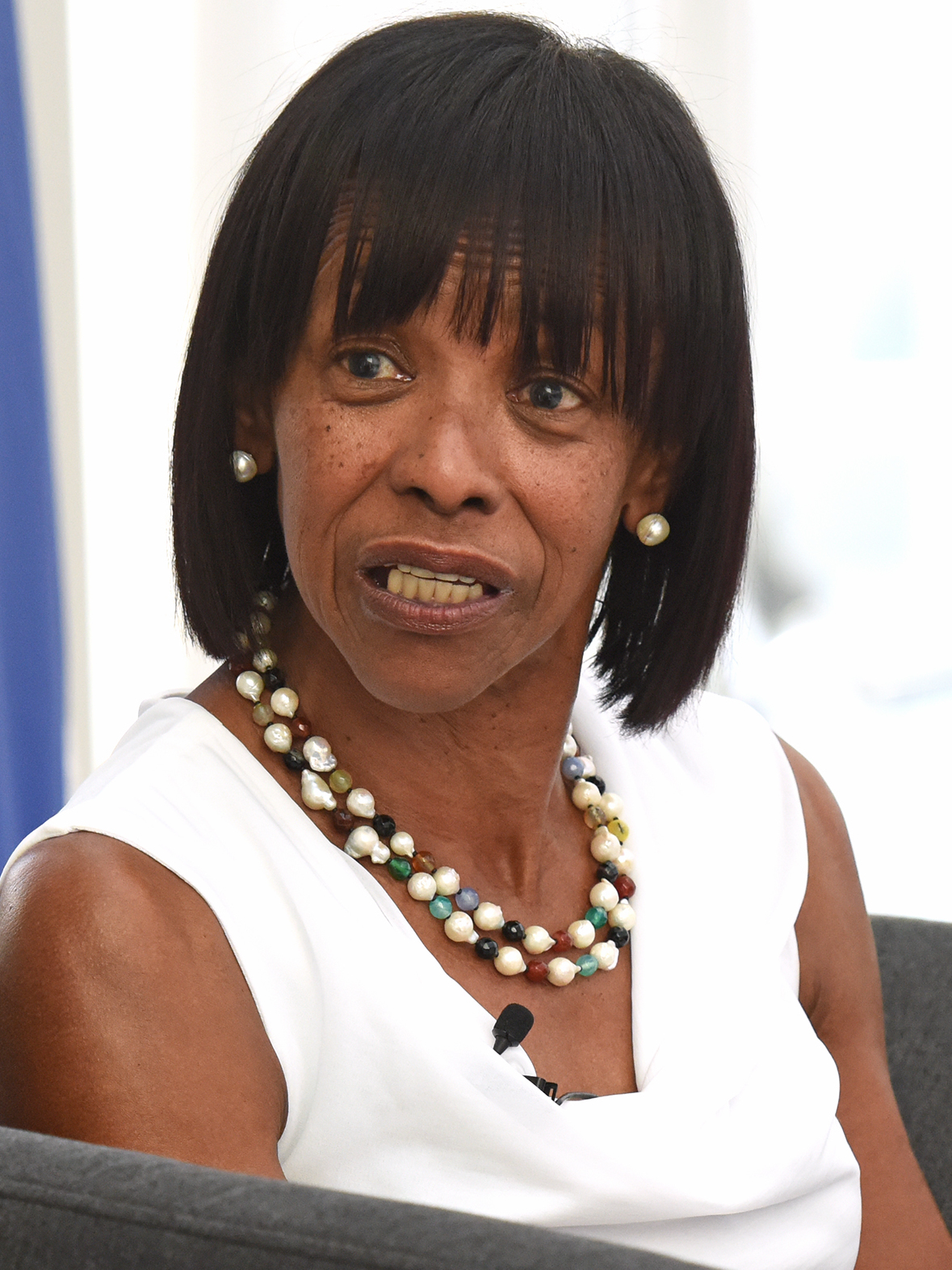
- Carolus in February 2018

South African High Commissioner to the United Kingdom
- In office 2 March 1998 – 1 November 2001
- President: Nelson Mandela; Thabo Mbeki
- Preceded by: Mendi Msimang
- Succeeded by: Lindiwe Mabuza

Secretary-General of the African National Congress
- Acting
- In office December 1996 – 20 December 1997
- President: Nelson Mandela
- Preceded by: Cyril Ramaphosa
- Succeeded by: Kgalema Motlanthe

Personal details
- Born: 27 May 1958 (age 68) Cape Town, Cape Province, South Africa
- Party: African National Congress
- Spouse: Graeme Bloch (died 2021)
- Education: University of the Western Cape
- Occupation: Politician; diplomat

Cheryl Carolus (born 27 May 1958) is a South African politician, diplomat and activist.

== Biography ==
Carolus was born on 27 May 1958 in Silvertown, on the Cape Flats, Cape Town. Her father was a printer’s assistant and her mother was a nurse. Carolus became involved in politics while still at school and became an activist as a member of the South African Black Students Association. She was detained for five months in 1976 for her anti-apartheid activism.

Carolus studied at the University of the Western Cape (UWC). After graduating, she became an English and History teacher in the Cape Flats.

In 1983, Carolus joined the United Democratic Front (UDF), serving as general secretary from the launch in August 1983. In May 1990, Carolus was elected to be part of the African National Congress' delegation which held talks with the apartheid government of F. W. de Klerk at Groote Schuur. She was one of two women in the delegation.

In July 1991, Carolus was elected to the ANC's National Executive Committee. She was elected Deputy Secretary General of the ANC in 1994. At the 1995 ANC Conference, when the National Coalition of Gay and Lesbian Equality was launched, Carolous stated that she opposed homophobia for the same reasons that she opposed racism and sexism. In 1997, Carolus became Acting General Secretary of the ANC.

In 1998, Carolus became South Africa's High Commissioner in London, serving until 2001.

From 2001, Carolus was the chief executive officer of South African Tourism, committing to Fair Trade in Tourism South Africa (FTTSA) and Pro-Poor Tourism Pilots in Southern Africa (PPT) during her tenure as CEO. She left the role in 2004. Carolus was then Board Chairperson for South African National Parks (SANPARKS), serving until 2012. In 2009, she assumed this position at South African Airways (SAA). She was also chairperson of Peotona Holdings, an investment company that deals with business development.

In 2014, Carolus became a patron of the Girl Child Institute of Mentorship (GCIM). Carolus is a member of the Executive Committee of the International Crisis Group. In 2015, she was a Trustee of the British Museum.

On 5 May 2018, the bodies of her husband Graeme Bloch's parents were discovered in Cape Town. They had been tied up and murdered. Bloch died in April 2021.

In 2022, Carolus became nonexecutive director and chair of the board of Grindrod.

== Honours ==
Carolus was awarded an Honorary Doctorate in Law by the University of Cape Town in 2004. She was also appointed to the French National Order of Merit by the government of France.
