= Thomas Nkobi =

South African politician (1922–1994)

Thomas Titus Nkobi

Treasurer General of the African National Congress
- In office 1973–1994
- Preceded by: Moses Kotane

Personal details
- Born: 22 October 1922 Plumtree, Southern Rhodesia
- Died: 25 September 1994 (aged 71) Johannesburg, South Africa
- Party: African National Congress
- Spouse: Winnifred Mangoane Nkobi
- Children: 5

Thomas Titus Nkobi (22 October 1922 – 25 September 1994) was a senior leader of the South African African National Congress (ANC) and a key figure in the Anti-Apartheid movement. Until his death he was the Treasurer General of the ANC and also its Member of Parliament.

== Life ==
Thomas Titus Nkobi ("Comrade T.G.") was born on 22 October 1922 in Plumtree, Matabeleland South, Southern Rhodesia (now Zimbabwe). He grew up and was educated in South Africa, where his father was working in the mines as a migrant labourer. He was at Adams College of Education in KwaZulu Natal with Joshua Nkomo, the Zimbabwean Vice-President and Bernard Chidzero, the Zimbabwean Minister of Finance and Dr. Ntsu Mokhehle, the Prime Minister of Lesotho. After completing High School in Natal he matriculated from Bantu High School (later Madibane High School) in Western Township, Johannesburg in 1946 and went to Roma College (now National University of Lesotho) in Lesotho, pursuing a Bachelor of Commerce degree.

His initial political involvement against the Apartheid regime started in 1944 during the Alexandra bus boycott, a non-violent protest campaign. In 1950 he formally joined the ANC and played a leading role in the 1952 ANC Defiance Campaign against Unjust Laws. He was one of the main volunteers who travelled from village to village collecting demands of the African population that were incorporated into the ANC Freedom Charter; he attended the 1955 Congress of the People in Kliptown that drew up the Freedom Charter as a delegate from Alexandra.

In 1957 Thomas Nkobi shot to prominence when he chaired the Second Alexandra Peoples Transport Committee which was co-ordinating a bus boycott in the Johannesburg and Pretoria townships following a 25 per cent increase in bus fares. In the same year he was arrested for participating in the nationwide South African Potato Boycott, following The Farm Labour Scandal, a journalistic investigation by Ruth First and Joe Gqabi, which uncovered that Africans arrested for infringement of the pass laws were coerced into enforced labour on potato farms. In 1958 Thomas Nkobi became the National Organizer of the ANC and was charged with the task of implementing the M-Plan, an action plan, named after Nelson Mandela, to decentralise the ANCs organizational branches and communication channels to avoid public meetings and announcements and increase effectiveness of their political and social campaign.

During the 1960 State of Emergency, he was amongst the thousands of political activists who were detained. After his release he continued working for the ANC as National Organizer and was also prominent in the underground. He was banned in 1961, and in 1962 placed under a 24-hour house arrest. In 1963 Thomas Nkobi fled South Africa for exile in Dar es Salaam / Tanzania and later Lusaka / Zambia, where he became actively involved in mobilising international public opinion against the Apartheid regime.

From 1968 to 1973 he served as deputy to then Treasurer General of the ANC, Moses Kotane. He was elected Treasurer General of the ANC in 1973, a post to which he was re-elected at all subsequent national conferences of the organisation.

After the ANC was in legalised in 1990 he returned to South Africa. There he oversaw the ANCs budget for South Africa's first democratic election, which brought the ANC to power. Thomas Nkobi was re-elected as Treasurer General at the party's 48th National Conference in 1991 and also elected as Member of Parliament, member of the ANC National Executive Committee (NEC) and member of the ANC's National Working Committee (NWC); one of several elders with moderate views who retained leadership positions.

== Death ==
He died on 25 September 1994, in Johannesburg after suffering a fatal stroke. He is buried at Thomas Titus Nkobi Memorial Park (formerly known as South Park Cemetery) in Johannesburg.

== Honours ==
In 2004, Thomas Nkobi posthumously received the Order of Luthuli in Gold for his "exceptional and selfless contribution to the struggle for a non-racial, non-sexist, free and democratic South Africa".

== Literature ==
- Ellis, Stephen & Sechaba, Tsepo (1992). Comrades Against Apartheid: the ANC and the South African Communist Party in exile. James Currey Publishers. pp. 48, 61, 128, 150, 166, 177, 196. ISBN 0852553528.
- Eriksen, Tore Linné (2000). Norway and national liberation in Southern Africa (PDF). Nordiska Afrikainstitutet. pp. 136, 147, 155. ISBN 9171064478.
- Maharaj, Zarina (2006). Dancing to a Different Rhythm. New Holland Publishers. pp. 15, 136, 146. ISBN 1770071083.
- Sellström, Tor (1999). Sweden and national liberation in Southern Africa. Vol. 1, Formation of a popular opinion (1950-1970) (PDF). Nordiska Afrikainstitutet. ISBN 91-7106-430-3.
- Sellström, Tor (1999). Liberation in Southern Africa - regional and Swedish voices: interviews from Angola, Mozambique, Namibia, South Africa, Zimbabwe, the frontline and Sweden (PDF). Nordiska Afrikainstitutet. pp. 104, 132, 136, 143, 146, 161, 164, 171, 201, 248, 252, 254pp. ISBN 9171065008.
- South African Democracy Education Trust, ed. (2004). The Road to Democracy in South Africa : Vol. 1: 1960–1970. New Holland Publishers. pp. 59pp, 65, 67, 72, 76pp, 79, 207, 352, 446, 477, 494pp, 596, 603, 608. ISBN 1868729060.
- Thomas, Scott (1996). The Diplomacy of Liberation: The Foreign Relations of the African National Congress Since 1960. I.B.Tauris. pp. 43, 57, 179. ISBN 1850439931.

== Films ==
- Hold up the Sun: The ANC and Popular Power in the Making. – Ulibambe lingashoni. / Episode 3 Interview with Thomas Nkobi. The Documentary History of the ANC: episode 1. Roots of struggle, [1912–1948] (52 min.). Episode 2. Enter the masses, [1949–1958] (52 min.). Episode 3. Submit or fight, [1958–1969] (52 min.). Episode 4. The new generation, [1968–1983] (52 min.). Episode 5. Not the kings and generals, [1983–1990] (52 min.). (English) Publisher: Ster-Kinekor Video. Braamfontein, Johannesburg, 1993.
