= Ruth Mompati =

South African politician (1925–2015)

Ruth Mompati OMSS

Member of Parliament, South African ambassador and mayor

Typist for Nelson Mandela and Oliver Tambo
- In office 1953–1961

Personal details
- Born: 14 September 1925 Far Northern Cape Province
- Died: 12 May 2015 (aged 89) Cape Town
- Party: African National Congress
- Education: Tygerkloof Teachers Training College

Ruth Segomotsi Mompati (14 September 1925 – 12 May 2015) was a South African politician and a founding member of the Federation of South African Women (FEDSAW) in 1954. Mompati was one of the leaders of the Women's March on 9 August 1956.

== Early life and education ==
Ruth Segomotsi Mompati was born in the far north of the former Cape Province (today's North West Province). Mompati grew up in Ganyesa, a village in the North West province. Her parents, Mrs Seli Babe Seichoko and Mr Gaonyatse Seichoko, were church leaders in the London Missionary Society Church (LMSC), Vryburg. After completing Standard 6, she worked for a white family as a childminder and later went to Tigerkloof Teachers Training College where she obtained a Primary School Teacher's Diploma in 1944.

== Career ==
In 1944, Mompati began teaching in Dithakwaneng Primary School near Vryburg. She later moved to Vryburg Higher Primary School, where she was a teacher until 1952. Mompati was automatically terminated from her teaching position 1952 when she got married as the apartheid laws prohibited black female teachers from getting married.

Mompati moved to Johannesburg in 1952, just after the Defiance Campaign began. She went to a private school to study shorthand and typing.

From 1953 to 1961, she worked as a typist for Nelson Mandela and Oliver Tambo in their law practice in Johannesburg. She joined the African National Congress (ANC) in 1954, and was elected to the National Executive Committee of the Women's League.

In 1990, Mompati was chosen to be part of the ANC delegation that negotiated the peaceful transition with the South African government and conditions to be met to end political conflict in South Africa at Groote Schuur. She was elected as a member of parliament in South Africa's first democratic election in 1994, where she served in the National Assembly until 1996.

Mompati was appointed ambassador to Switzerland from 1996 to 2000. Upon her return from Switzerland, she was elected mayor of Vryburg, North West. She served as an executive member of the Umkhonto we Sizwe Veteran's Association.

== Death ==
Mompati died on 12 May 2015, aged 89, following an illness at a Cape Town hospital.
