= Thenjiwe Mtintso =

South African politician (born 1950)

South African Ambassador to Romania
- In office 2014–2016
- President: Jacob Zuma
- Preceded by: Duduzile Moerane Khoza
- Succeeded by: Jabu Mbalula

Deputy General Secretary of the African National Congress
- In office 1997–2004

Member of the National Assembly of South Africa
- In office 29 April 1994 – 2 June 1999

Personal details
- Born: 7 November 1950 (age 75) Soweto, Johannesburg, Republic of South Africa

Thenjiwe Mtintso (born 7 November 1950) is a South African anti-apartheid activist, politician and ambassador who has held senior positions within the African National Congress (ANC), the South African Communist Party (SACP), and is a veteran of uMkhonto we Sizwe (MK).

== Life ==
Thenjiwe was born and raised in Soweto, Johannesburg. She is daughter to Hanna " MaRadebe" Mtintso and Gana Makabeni, who also served as a trade unionist and member of the African National Congress (ANC). Thenjiwe became a student activist in the South African Student Organisation (SASO) and Black Consciousness Movement (BCM) during her studies at the University of Fort Hare.

One of Thenjiwe's most notable encounters with the Apartheid law, was when she was arrested in October 1976. While still in detention, she was charged with a 5-year ban in December 1976. Following 282 days in jail, she and Joyce Mokhesi were released.

In 1977, when Steve Biko, an activist with whom she had worked with, was murdered by the police while being held in custody, she went into exile. In the wake of Biko's death, she moved to Lesotho to join Umkhonto we Sizwe (Zulu and Xhosa: "Spear of the Nation"), the armed wing of the ANC, and the SACP.

She was elected to Parliament following South Africa's first multiracial elections in 1994, she was Chair of the Commission of Gender Equality in 1997. Since 2007, she has served as South Africa's ambassador to Cuba (2003–2008), Italy (2009–2012), Romania (2014–2016), and Spain (2019–2022).
