= List of members of the 2007–12 African National Congress National Executive Committee =

The members of the National Executive Committee of the African National Congress elected at the 52nd national conference in 2007 in Polokwane, will serve until the next national conference in 2012.

A new resolution increased the number of seats in the NEC from 60 to 86, and mandated that at least half of the NEC be composed of female members. Former deputy president of South Africa Jacob Zuma beat president of South Africa Thabo Mbeki for the position of president of the ANC.

== Officials ==
Title	Winner	Votes	Loser	Votes
President	Jacob Zuma	2329	Thabo Mbeki	1505
Deputy President	Kgalema Motlanthe	2346	Nkosazana Dlamini-Zuma	1444
National Chairperson	Baleka Mbete	2326	Joel Netshitenzhe	1475
Secretary General	Gwede Mantashe	2378	Mosiuoa Lekota	1432
Deputy Secretary General	Thandi Modise	2304	Thoko Didiza	1455
Treasurer General	Mathews Phosa	2328	Phumzile Mlambo-Ngcuka	1374

== Body ==
Title	Name	Votes
National Working Committee	Collins Chabane	2043
National Working Committee	Bathabile Dlamini	1933
National Working Committee	Jessie Duarte	2448
National Working Committee	Tina Joemat-Petterson	1369
National Working Committee	Pallo Jordan	2645
National Working Committee	Ncumisa Kondlo	1619
National Working Committee	Fikile Mbalula	2116
National Working Committee	Nomaindia Mfeketo	1943
National Working Committee	Angie Motshekga	1906
National Working Committee	Nathi Mthethwa	1629
National Working Committee	Maite Nkoana-Mashabane	1337
National Working Committee	Siphiwe Nyanda	2005
National Working Committee	Blade Nzimande	2157
National Working Committee	Dina Pule	1730
National Working Committee	Jeff Radebe	2716
National Working Committee	Susan Shabangu	1775
National Working Committee	Lindiwe Sisulu	2384
National Working Committee	Max Sisulu	2041
National Working Committee	Makhenkesi Stofile	2151
National Working Committee	Tony Yengeni	2032
Member	Ruth Bhengu	1729
Member	Nyami Booi	1709
Member	Lynne Brown	1623
Member	Zoleka Capa-Langa	1506
Member	Bheki Cele	1950
Member	Jeremy Cronin	2519
Member	Nkosazana Dlamini-Zuma	1885
Member	Ayanda Dlodlo	1641
Member	Ndleleni Duma	1447
Member	Ebrahim Ebrahim	1964
Member	Malusi Gigaba	2144
Member	Enoch Godongwana	1891
Member	Derek Hanekom	1996
Member	Hazel Jenkins	1496
Member	Charlotte Lobe	1494
Member	Janet Love	1670
Member	Brigitte Mabandla	2235
Member	Joyce Mabudafhasi	1698
Member	David Mabuza	1572
Member	Winnie Madikizela-Mandela	2845
Member	Nozizwe Madlala-Routledge	1905
Member	Dikeledi Magadzi	1424
Member	Ace Magashule	2121
Member	Sibongile Manana	1496
Member	Trevor Manuel	1590
Member	Nosiviwe Mapisa-Nqakula	1490
Member	Billy Masetlha	1937
Member	Joyce Mashamba	1497
Member	Phumulo Masualle	1484
Member	Noluthando Mayende-Sibiya	1345
Member	Zweli Mkhize	1976
Member	Nomvula Mokonyane	1756
Member	Joyce Moloi-Moropa	1470
Member	Valli Moosa	2110
Member	Playfair Morule	1468
Member	Mathole Motshekga	1613
Member	Aaron Motsoaledi	1591
Member	Sankie Mthembi-Mahanyele	2291
Member	Jackson Mthembu	1590
Member	Thenjiwe Mtintso	1616
Member	Thaba Mufamadi	1496
Member	Sibusiso Ndebele	1427
Member	Joel Netshitenzhe	1437
Member	Nosipho Ntwanabi	1403
Member	Naledi Pandor	1431
Member	Joe Phaahla	1726
Member	Febe Potgieter-Gqubule	2091
Member	Cyril Ramaphosa	1910
Member	Ngoako Ramathlodi	2034
Member	Tokyo Sexwale	2198
Member	Sicelo Shiceka	1532
Member	Lyndall Shope-Mafole	1642
Member	Zola Skweyiya	2700
Member	Thandi Tobias	1675
Member	Sisisi Tolashe	1574
Member	Manto Tshabalala-Msimang	1591
Member	Sue van der Merwe	1593
Member	Fikile Xasa	1615
Member	Lumka Yengeni	1907
Member	Lindiwe Zulu	1682

Ex officio members: Nelson Mandela and Thabo Mbeki.
