= Makhenkesi Stofile =

South African politician (1944–2016)

Chancellor of the University of Fort Hare
- In office 5 May 2016 – 15 August 2016
- Preceded by: Thembile Skweyiya
- Succeeded by: Dumisa Ntsebeza

South African Ambassador to Germany
- In office 1 June 2011 – December 2015
- President: Jacob Zuma
- Preceded by: Sonwabo Eddie Funde
- Succeeded by: Stone Sizani

Minister of Sport and Recreation
- In office 29 April 2004 – 31 October 2010
- President: Thabo Mbeki; Kgalema Motlanthe; Jacob Zuma
- Deputy: Gert Oosthuizen
- Preceded by: Ngconde Balfour
- Succeeded by: Fikile Mbalula

2nd Premier of the Eastern Cape
- In office 4 February 1997 – 26 April 2004
- Preceded by: Raymond Mhlaba
- Succeeded by: Nosimo Balindlela

Chief Whip of the Majority Party
- In office May 1994 – February 1997
- Speaker: Frene Ginwala
- Preceded by: Office established
- Succeeded by: Max Sisulu
Party offices 1994–2006
Provincial Chairperson of the Eastern Cape African National Congress
In office 1996 – December 2006
Deputy	Stone Sizani; Enoch Godongwana
Preceded by	Dumisani Mafu
Succeeded by	Stone Sizani
Treasurer of the African National Congress
In office December 1994 – December 1997
President	Nelson Mandela
Preceded by	Thomas Nkobi
Succeeded by	Mendi Msimang

Personal details
- Born: Makhenkesi Arnold Stofile; 27 December 1944 Adelaide, Cape Province; Union of South Africa
- Died: 15 August 2016 (aged 71) Alice, South Africa
- Party: African National Congress
- Spouse: Nambitha Siwisa
- Education: University of Fort Hare; Princeton University
- Nicknames: Stof; Bra Stof; Mfundisi

Makhenkesi Arnold Stofile (27 December 1944 – 15 August 2016) was a South African politician and anti-apartheid activist who served as the second Premier of the Eastern Cape from 1997 to 2004. After that, he was Minister of Sport and Recreation from 2004 to 2010. He was also a member of the National Executive Committee of the African National Congress (ANC).

Born in the Eastern Cape, Stofile was an ordained minister of the Presbyterian Church of Southern Africa and spent much of the apartheid era as a theologian at the University of Fort Hare. At the same time, he had joined the ANC underground in 1970; in 1983, he became involved in the United Democratic Front, both as regional secretary in the Border Region and as a member of the national executive. In 1987, he was convicted of a political offence and imprisoned in the Ciskei for three years. Himself an accomplished rugby player, Stofile was also an active figure in non-racial sports administration in the Eastern Cape, and he co-founded the National Sports Congress in 1989.

After the end of apartheid in 1994, Stofile joined the National Assembly as the ANC's inaugural Majority Chief Whip. He held that position until February 1997, when he returned to his home province to replace Raymond Mhlaba as Premier of the Eastern Cape. He was also the national Treasurer of the ANC from 1994 to 1997 and its Provincial Chairperson in the Eastern Cape from 1996 to 2006.

Stofile returned to the national government after the April 2004 general election, appointed as Minister of Sport and Recreation in the second cabinet of President Thabo Mbeki. During his tenure in the ministry, South Africa hosted the 2010 FIFA World Cup. After President Jacob Zuma sacked Stofile from the cabinet in October 2010, he served as South African Ambassador to Germany between 2011 and 2015, when he retired.

== Early life and education ==
Stofile was born on 27 December 1944 on a farm in Adelaide in the former Cape Province. He was the eldest of seven sons born to Simon and Tozana Stofile, who were farm labourers. In 1952, his family moved to Port Elizabeth, where Stofile matriculated at Newell High School in 1964. Thereafter he worked as a machine operator at a textile factory in Port Elizabeth from 1965 to 1968. He left this job after he received a bursary from the Presbyterian Church of Southern Africa, apparently at the urging of Reverend J. J. R. Jolobe.

He went on to study at the University of Fort Hare, where he completed four degrees: a Bachelor of Arts in 1971, a Bachelor of Theology in 1974, an Honours in theology in 1975, and a Master's in theology in 1979. He completed a diploma in theology at the University of Tübingen in 1981, and a second Master's at Princeton University in 1983.

== Early career and activism ==
After his graduation, he remained at Fort Hare until 1986 as a senior lecturer in theology, systematic theology, and philosophy of religion. He had also been ordained as a minister in the Presbyterian Church while a postgraduate student in 1975.

While working in academia, Stofile became increasingly politically active in the anti-apartheid movement. He had entered politics in 1963 as a teenaged member of the African Students Association, a front organisation for the anti-apartheid African National Congress (ANC), which had been banned since 1960. In 1970, he was recruited into the underground of the ANC, and he rose through the ranks to become chairperson of the local area political committee from 1979 to 1986. According to one of his political aides, he received military training with Umkhonto we Sizwe.

When the United Democratic Front (UDF) was established in 1983, Stofile was elected as UDF regional secretary in the Border Region of the Eastern Cape. He therefore played an important role in establishing the front's structures in the area; for example, he recruited Matthew Goniwe, one of the Cradock Four who were assassinated in 1985. He was also elected to the UDF's national executive committee. He held both offices from 1983 until his arrest in 1986.

We either surrender to them or fight. We have decided to fight. You also have two options: you either join with us or we fight against you.

— Stofile's address at Victoria Mxenge's funeral in the Ciskei, August 1985

=== Non-racial sport ===
Stofile had been involved in non-racial sports administration at several levels since 1965, particularly in rugby, cricket, and netball; among other positions, he served as president of the Victoria East Rugby Union. He was himself an accomplished rugby player – playing scrum half and wing, he was captain of the Fort Hare First XV and of the Border team – and he coached rugby at the junior and club level from 1974 onwards.

In 1984, Stofile established a dedicated "cultural desk" within the UDF, which included sports matters. Later the same year, he spearheaded a successful UDF campaign against a planned All Blacks tour of South Africa; representing the UDF, he travelled to New Zealand to provide evidence in a related court case. Upon his return to South Africa, he was detained for four months.

=== Prison sentence ===
In early 1986, Stofile was a member of a UDF delegation to a strategy meeting with exiled ANC leaders in Sweden. Upon his return, he was arrested in the Ciskei, accused of harbouring terrorists. In May 1987, he was convicted under the Internal Security Act of terrorism, illegal possession of weapons, and furthering the aims of the outlawed ANC. He was sentenced to 11 years in prison. However, he served only three years: he was released in 1989 ahead of the negotiations to end apartheid.

=== Transition to democracy ===
Later in 1989, Stofile – with Mluleki George and Krish Naidoo – launched the National Sports Congress, a non-racial competitor to the South African Council on Sport that was comfortable with supporting mass-based anti-apartheid organisation. He served as vice-president of the congress. Working with the mass democratic movement, it staged large-scale protests against an English cricket tour of South Africa in 1989 to 1990, forcing the South African Cricket Union to negotiate a shortened tour. During the negotiations to end apartheid, the congress was prominent in campaigns to normalise sport in the country. According to John Carlin, Stofile was, with Steve Tshwete, one of the main advocates in the ANC for the normalisation of sport as a route to fostering national unity; rugby, Stofile famously said, was "the opium of the Boer". He was later a member of the executive council of the South African Rugby Football Union.

At the same time, the ANC was unbanned by the apartheid government in 1990, and Stofile joined the internal leadership corps that worked to re-establish the party's legal structures inside South Africa. He was elected as the regional chairperson of the party's branch in the Border Region. The following year, at the ANC's 48th National Conference in July 1991, Stofile was elected to the ANC's National Executive Committee. He received 1,546 votes across roughly 2,000 ballots, making him the tenth-most popular member of the 50-member committee. He also resumed his academic career, joining the University of Transkei as a senior theology lecturer in 1991 and then returning to Fort Hare as director of public relations and development from 1992 to 1994.

== National Assembly: 1994–1997 ==
=== Chief Whip of the Majority Party ===
In the April 1994 general election, Stofile was elected to represent the ANC in the National Assembly, the lower house of the new post-apartheid Parliament of South Africa. He was the inaugural Chief Whip of the Majority Party in the first democratic parliament. Stofile later said of his appointment, "I got the shock of my life. I didn't even know what this thing was". He said that he had immediately gone to the parliamentary library to ask for resources about being chief whip, and he was later surprised to learn that MPs would receive salaries.

In Stofile's summation, "I became a counsellor, a guide, a resource and information centre. I was like the village schoolmaster." The Mail & Guardian described him as notably "laidback" as chief whip, but he provoked the ire of Jennifer Ferguson – whom he prevented from addressing the house by singing the words of a Bertolt Brecht poem to music – among other MPs. In addition, by the end of 1994, Parliament had amended its rules to broaden the definition of parliamentary "spouses", for benefits purposes, among other things. Stofile said of the change:

We wanted the people of South Africa to see that human interaction cannot be forced into narrow, religious, ceremonial relationships. There are other valid forms of partnership than the traditional Christian heterosexual marriage, and we needed to take note of that. If we are talking about a rainbow nation, we must also accept a rainbow of traditions and a rainbow of norms.

=== Election as ANC treasurer ===
At the ANC's 49th National Conference, held in Bloemfontein in December 1994, Stofile was elected to a three-year term as national treasurer of the ANC, succeeding Thomas Nkobi. He was elected unopposed after Henry Makgothi and Sam Motsuenyane withdrew their candidacy, although the Mail & Guardian reported that ANC president Nelson Mandela had backed Motsuenyane. In his capacity as treasurer, Stofile froze the funding of the ANC Women's League, then led by Winnie Madikizela-Mandela; in 1996, he and Tshwete, then the ANC's head of organising, were appointed to provide interim leadership of the league amid divisions between Madikizela-Mandela and other senior women, including Adelaide Tambo.

=== Election as ANC chairperson ===
Also in 1996, Stofile was elected to succeed Dumisani Mafu as Provincial Chairperson of the ANC's Eastern Cape branch. Serving alongside him were Stone Sizani, as his deputy, and Humphrey Maxegwana, as Provincial Secretary. He continued to serve concurrently as national treasurer until his term as treasurer expired at the next national party conference in December 1997; Mendi Msimang was elected, unopposed, to succeed him.

== Premier of the Eastern Cape: 1997–2004 ==
In February 1997, Stofile left the National Assembly to take office as Premier of the Eastern Cape, succeeding Raymond Mhlaba. His promotion to this office had been expected for some time, and he was replaced as Chief Whip by Max Sisulu. Although frequently admired as a "no-nonsense politician", he was criticised for presiding over mismanagement and administrative disarray in the Eastern Cape. In 1998, for example, the provincial government discovered that, due to an "oversight" by Stofile, its annual budget had not been gazetted as required by the Constitution, meaning that the last six months of expenditure had technically been illegal. In 2002, the press published a leaked copy of a letter from Mkhuseli Jack to President Thabo Mbeki in which Jack accused Stofile of poor governance and urged for him to be dismissed.

The Mail & Guardian said that Stofile's appointment was likely due more to his grassroots popularity than to his competence. However, the same newspaper also complimented his HIV/AIDS policy: unlike several other premiers, Stofile supported mother-to-child transmission prevention programmes, including through nevirapine access.

=== National management team ===
On 28 November 2002, President Mbeki announced that the national government, concerned "for some time... about the quality of the administration in the Eastern Cape", would send a multi-sector management team to the Eastern Cape to investigate service delivery lapses in the province. With the approval of the cabinet, the team was appointed by Public Service and Administration Minister Geraldine Fraser-Moleketi. In April 2003, Fraser-Moleketi reported to the press that the team had found a "province in shambles", but Stofile said that her assessment was "unscientific... 'Shambles' is a very strong term." He also dismissed Fraser-Moleketi's report that the team had found a backlog of 800 disciplinary cases, saying that the figure of 800 was "not a revelation, but a confirmation of what we had already".

=== Re-election as ANC chairperson ===
During his tenure as premier, Stofile continued to serve as ANC Provincial Chairperson, gaining re-election to a second and third term in that office. His re-election in 2002 involved the resounding defeat of a challenge to his incumbency by Mluleki George, who was the favoured candidate of the national ANC leadership under President Mbeki. After the national leadership found that some preparatory meetings had been inquorate, the same election was re-run in 2003, now with an even stronger majority for Stofile over George. The demand that the election be re-run had come amidst rumours that Stofile, along with other Eastern Cape politicians, was part of a leftist conspiracy to oust Mbeki from the party presidency.

== Minister of Sport and Recreation: 2004–2010 ==
As early as April 2003, Stofile was presumed unlikely to be reappointed as Premier after the April 2004 general election. Instead, after that election, he was appointed to Mbeki's second-term cabinet, succeeding Ngconde Balfour as Minister of Sport and Recreation. The Mail & Guardian referred to the office as "relatively lowly" and as a "sop" for losing the premiership. Although Vincent Ngema of the Inkatha Freedom Party was initially named as his deputy minister, Gert Oosthuizen filled that office instead.

Stofile was appointed to the ministry shortly before FIFA announced that South Africa had won the right to host the 2010 Soccer World Cup. Overseeing the tournament and related preparations constituted a large portion of Stofile's responsibilities over the next six years. The ministry also backed an unsuccessful South African bid to host the 2011 Rugby World Cup. In September 2009, he said there would be a "third world war" if the International Association of Athletics Federations prevented Caster Semenya from competing at the World Championship; and in 2010, he encouraged the New Zealand Rugby Union and South African Rugby Union to apologise to Maori players who had been excluded from All Blacks tours of South Africa in 1928, 1949, and 1960.

Stofile was also involved in the ongoing debate about racial quotas in team sports. In June 2004, Stofile had announced the scrapping of such quotas in favour of renewed emphasis on codes of conduct and sports development strategies; new legislation was later introduced, but Stofile announced conclusively in November 2007 that "Quotas are out", saying that, "Quotas were used only for window-dressing for international consumption."

=== Succession as ANC chairperson ===
Stofile stepped down as ANC Provincial Chairperson upon the expiry of his third term in December 2006. His rivalry with Mluleki George continued, as each backed opposing sides in the race to take over the chairmanship: Stofile reportedly supported Mcebisi Jonas, while George supported the winning candidate, Stone Sizani.

After Stofile vacated his provincial position, Cosatu touted him as a possible candidate for election as National Chairperson of the ANC, were the frontrunner, Nkosazana Dlamini-Zuma, to become unavailable. The Congress of South African Trade Unions also reportedly supported his nomination to the National Executive Committee, as did supporters of Jacob Zuma, who were planning to oust Mbeki from the party presidency. At the ANC's next national conference, held in December 2007 in Polokwane, Stofile was elected to the National Executive Committee; he received 2,151 votes across roughly 4,000 ballots, making him the 12th-most popular candidate of the 80 ordinary members elected to the committee. He was also elected to the ANC's National Working Committee.

=== Dismissal ===
Stofile remained in the Sport and Recreation portfolio throughout Mbeki's second term, and he was retained in the cabinet of President Kgalema Motlanthe and then in the cabinet of President Jacob Zuma. However, the Mail & Guardian reported in March 2010 that Zuma had included Stofile only "to show his commitment to ANC unity" and that the pair had since clashed in cabinet meetings about the FIFA World Cup; according to the newspaper, Stofile was in line to be sacked. Indeed, in a reshuffle announced on 31 October 2010, Zuma dismissed Stofile and replaced him with Fikile Mbalula. Stofile resigned from the National Assembly the following day, ceding his seat to Crosby Moni.

== Ambassador to Germany: 2011–2015 ==
In early 2011, Stofile was announced as Zuma's Ambassador-Designate to Germany. He was accredited in Berlin on 1 June 2011, and he remained in the post until December 2015, when he retired. His term on the ANC National Executive Committee expired in December 2012 and he failed to gain re-election.

== Personal life and death ==
Apart from his proficiency in South African languages, Stofile read and wrote Greek, Hebrew and German. He played lawn-tennis since primary school and was the national champion in ballroom dance from 1972 to 1975, partnering his wife; according to his spokesperson, he was strongest at the tango. Later in his life, he began coaching rugby again, including while he was ambassador in Germany. His brother, Mike Stofile, was a senior official in Border Rugby and later in the South African Rugby Union. At his brother's funeral in October 2015, Stofile joked that he "died on the day the Springboks were beaten by Japan. I see he was disgusted and he decided to go."

In 2003, the Mail & Guardian wrongly reported that Nomvuyiso Stofile, an ANC candidate for the Eastern Cape Provincial Legislature, was Stofile's wife. He was in fact married for over thirty years to Nambitha Stofile. Their son Sikhulule, a 21-year-old student at Varsity College, was killed in a car accident in Rondebosch, Cape Town on 29 May 1999. They also had two daughters. His wife's business interests – particularly a directorship in a security company and safari company, both of which held contracts with the Eastern Cape Provincial Government – were occasionally a source of contention in the media during Stofile's premiership. The couple denied that Stofile was exposed to any conflict of interest. In addition, Stofile's brother-in-law, Hintsa Siwisa, was chairperson of the South African Oil Company, a politically connected company that was involved in a controversial Nigerian oil deal.

In July 2016, Stofile was diagnosed with cancer. He died on 15 August 2016 at his home in Alice. President Zuma granted him a special official funeral.

== Honours ==
In 2000, the University of Port Elizabeth awarded him an honorary PhD. In February 2016, it was announced that he would succeed Thembile Skweyiya as chancellor of his alma mater, the University of Fort Hare.

Political offices
Preceded by Raymond Mhlaba	Premier of the Eastern Cape; 4 February 1997 – 26 April 2004	Succeeded by Nosimo Balindlela
Preceded by Ngconde Balfour	Minister of Sport and Recreation; 2004 – 1 November 2010	Succeeded by Fikile Mbalula
