= Mbalula =

Mbalula is a surname. Notable people with the surname include:

- Fikile Mbalula (born 1971), South African politician
- Jabu Mbalula (born 1967), South African politician and diplomat
