= Nathi Mthethwa =

South African politician (1967–2025)

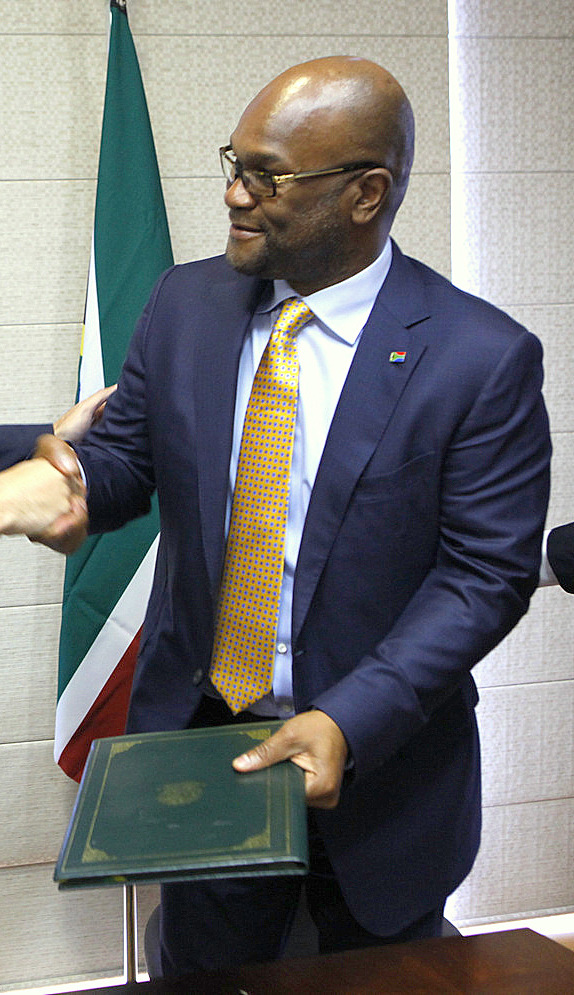
- Mthethwa in 2018

South African Ambassador to France
- In office 29 February 2024 – 30 September 2025
- President: Cyril Ramaphosa
- Deputy: Nocawe Mafu
- Preceded by: Sidwell Nyatsumba

Minister of Sports, Arts and Culture
- In office 30 May 2019 – 6 March 2023
- President: Cyril Ramaphosa
- Deputy: Rejoice Mabudafhasi; Maggie Sotyu
- Preceded by: Portfolio established
- Succeeded by: Zizi Kodwa

Minister of Arts and Culture
- In office 25 May 2014 – 30 May 2019
- President: Jacob Zuma; Cyril Ramaphosa
- Preceded by: Paul Mashatile
- Succeeded by: Himself (for Sports, Arts and Culture)

Minister of Police
- In office 10 May 2009 – 25 May 2014
- President: Jacob Zuma
- Deputy: Fikile Mbalula; Maggie Sotyu
- Preceded by: Himself (for Safety and Security)
- Succeeded by: Nkosinathi Nhleko

Minister of Safety and Security
- In office 25 September 2008 – 10 May 2009
- President: Kgalema Motlanthe
- Deputy: Susan Shabangu
- Preceded by: Charles Nqakula
- Succeeded by: Himself (for Police)

Chief Whip of the Majority Party
- In office 23 January 2008 – 25 September 2008
- President: Thabo Mbeki
- Preceded by: Isaac Mogase
- Succeeded by: Mnyamezeli Booi

Personal details
- Born: Emmanuel Nkosinathi Mthethwa; 23 January 1967 Clermont, Natal Province, South Africa
- Died: 29 September 2025 (aged 58) Paris, France
- Party: African National Congress
- Spouse: Philisiwe Buthelezi (m. 2013)
- Profession: Politician, diplomat

Emmanuel Nkosinathi Mthethwa (23 January 1967 – 30 September 2025) was a South African politician who served as South African Ambassador to France from 2024 until his death in 2025. He represented the African National Congress (ANC) in the National Assembly of South Africa between 2002 and 2023, and he was a cabinet minister between September 2008 and March 2023.

Born in KwaZulu-Natal, Mthethwa rose to prominence in the ANC Youth League and joined the National Assembly in 2002. Pursuant to the ANC's 52nd National Conference in December 2007, he was elected to the ANC's National Executive Committee and National Working Committee, on which he served continuously until December 2022. In the aftermath of the 52nd National Conference, in January 2008, the ANC installed him as Chief Whip of the Majority Party in the National Assembly. He held that position until he ascended to the cabinet in September 2008.

Appointed by President Kgalema Motlanthe as Minister of Safety and Security, he continued in the same office, later renamed Minister of Police, in the first-term cabinet of President Jacob Zuma. During his tenure in the police portfolio from 2008 to 2014, Mthethwa's ministry had played a controversial role in the Marikana massacre and Nkandlagate controversy. He became Minister of Arts and Culture in May 2014 and Minister of Sports, Arts and Culture in May 2019, but he dropped off the ANC's National Executive Committee at the party's 55th National Conference in December 2022 and President Cyril Ramaphosa sacked him from the cabinet in March 2023. He resigned from the National Assembly a week later.

== Early life and education ==
Mthethwa was born on 23 January 1967 in Clermont, a township outside Durban in the former Natal Province. He grew up in the Durban suburb of Klaarwater and in KwaMthethwa on the outskirts of KwaMbonambi.

He completed a diploma in community development at the University of Natal, a certificate in mining engineering at the University of Johannesburg, and a certificate in communications and leadership at Rhodes University.

== Early political career ==
Mthethwa became active in the students' anti-apartheid movement as a teenager, joining the Klaarwater Youth Organisation in 1982 and serving as its chairperson from 1987 to 1989. He was also a shop steward for the local Food and Allied Workers Union (FAWU), and his trade union activism brought him into contact with the banned African National Congress (ANC); he was recruited to do underground work for the ANC's Operation Vula in 1988 and 1989. After he was detained during the 1989 state of emergency, he was elected as chairperson of the Southern Natal branch of the South African Youth Congress and as chairperson of the Southern Natal Unemployed Workers' Union.

After the ANC was unbanned in 1990, Mthethwa was elected as the inaugural secretary of the party's new branch in Klaarwater. He also served as regional secretary of the Southern Natal branch of the ANC Youth League from 1990 to 1992. In 1994, he was elected to the national executive committee of the ANC Youth League, where he served until 2001 as the league's secretary for organization. From 2001 to 2002, he worked for the mainstream ANC in its national organising team, based at party headquarters at Luthuli House.

== National Assembly: 2002–2008 ==
Mthethwa joined the South African Parliament in 2002, filling a casual vacancy in an ANC seat in the National Assembly of South Africa. He was elected to a full term in his seat in the April 2004 general election, and on 24 June 2004 he was elected unopposed to succeed Mbulelo Goniwe as chairperson of the Portfolio Committee on Minerals and Energy.

In December 2007, while serving as committee chairman, Mthethwa attended the ANC's 52nd National Conference, where he was elected for the first time to a five-year term on the party's National Executive Committee. He received 1,629 votes across 3,605 ballots, making him the 48th-most popular member of the 80-member committee. At the committee's first meeting on 7 January 2008, he was additionally elected to the party's 20-member National Working Committee.

On 23 January 2008, the ANC removed Isaac Mogase as Chief Whip of the Majority Party in the National Assembly and appointed Mthethwa to replace him. The reshuffle of the parliamentary caucus, which also included the appointment of Ncumisa Kondlo as caucus chairperson, was described by ANC secretary-general Gwede Mantashe as a move meant to create synergy between "the [ANC] national executive committee and the party's leadership in Parliament".

== Minister of Police: 2008–2014 ==
In September 2008, Kgalema Motlanthe was elected as president in a midterm election, and he appointed Mthethwa to serve as Minister of Safety and Security in his new cabinet. Political commentator Ferial Haffajee suggested that Mthethwa's "meteoric rise ... shows how much loyalty counts in the ANC"; she pointed in particular to Mthethwa's public attacks on the Scorpions, the elite law enforcement agency that the incumbent ANC leadership intended to abolish. Mthethwa was retained in the safety and security portfolio by President Jacob Zuma, who succeeded Motlanthe as president in the April 2009 general election; Zuma renamed the office as Minister of Police.

Midway through his tenure as police minister, Mthethwa attended the ANC's 53rd National Conference in December 2012, where he was re-elected to a second five-year term on the party's National Executive Committee, now ranked tenth by popularity. He was also re-elected to the National Working Committee.

=== Marikana massacre ===
Mthethwa was Minister of Police during the August 2012 Marikana massacre, when members of the South African Police Service (SAPS) opened fire on striking miners in the most lethal use of force by South African security forces against civilians since 1976. Mthethwa's role was scrutinised because of evidence that, in the days before the confrontation, he had taken phone calls with the SAPS operational command, with National Union of Mineworkers president Senzeni Zokwana, and with mining magnate and former politician Cyril Ramaphosa; Zokwana and Ramaphosa had reportedly expressed concern about the inadequate police response to the strike, which some observers inferred had led Mthethwa to exert pressure on SAPS to upgrade its response. The families of the victims of the massacre, through their lawyer George Bizos, additionally suggested that Mthethwa was "vicariously responsible" for the deaths insofar as he had publicly endorsed a "shoot to kill" approach, thereby creating the hostile policing environment that led to the massacre.

When he appeared before the Marikana Commission of Inquiry in July 2014, Mthethwa acknowledged that "something terribly wrong took place" at Marikana and accepted political accountability, saying that, "as the political head at the time, I'd have been responsible for all the things the police were doing". However, though he confirmed that he had relayed Zokwana and Ramaphosa's concerns to the provincial SAPS commissioner, he denied that there had been political pressure for a harsh police response. He also said that he had no operational involvement whatsoever in the police response, had not helped formulate the policing plan, and had only learned of the mass shooting when he heard about it on the radio.

Judge Ian Farlam's final report on the commission's findings, published in 2015, did not recommend any remedial action against Mthethwa. Farlam did condemn a speech that Mthethwa made after the shooting, in which he had exhorted police to "continue ensuring that lives are saved"; Farlam found these remarks to constitute "a serious error of judgment ... in giving what would have been understood to be an unqualified endorsement of the police action". However, on the question of political input into police tactics at Marikana, the report was more ambivalent, reflecting:

If guidance of the executive played a role, then it is probable that such guidance was conveyed to the [police management] by Minister Mthethwa. The commission wishes to emphasise that it is not finding that such 'guidance' was given. It is, however, unable in the light of what has been said above to find positively in Minister Mthethwa's favour on the point.

Although the commission was regarded as having given Mthethwa a mere "slap on the wrist", Farlam later expressed frustration with this framing, saying that the report, though hampered by inconclusive evidence, had not necessarily "exonerated" Mthethwa and need not have precluded a criminal investigation into his conduct.

=== Crime intelligence slush fund ===
In April 2012, City Press reported that the Hawks were investigating claims that Mthethwa had benefitted personally from a slush fund managed by the SAPS Crime Intelligence Division. The slush fund had allegedly been used to fund renovations at Mthethwa's family home in KwaMthethwa, worth R195,000, between 2010 and 2011; the slush fund had also allegedly been used to buy a luxury Mercedes-Benz that Mthethwa drove for some 15 months. According to the City Press report, Mthethwa was attempting to suppress the Hawks investigation, which was being pursued by acting police chief Nhlanhla Mkhwanazi. However, he denied the allegations; the paper quoted him as saying that Mercedes-Benz was not his "favourite brand".

In July 2012, the Auditor-General, Terence Nombembe, concluded his own investigation into the allegations. His report concluded that the renovations were funded by the crime intelligence slush fund – contrary to Mthethwa's account – but that there was no evidence that Mthethwa had been aware of the source of the funds. During the same period, the Mail & Guardian reported on a leaked police intelligence report that described Mkhwanazi as having "targeted" Mthethwa out of prejudice; journalist Sam Sole described it as evidence of a "bitter struggle in the top echelons of the police".

The saga resurfaced at the Zondo Commission in 2019 when multiple police sources testified that the renovations at Mthethwa's home had been linked to systematic abuse of the crime intelligence slush fund under former crime intelligence head Richard Mdluli. Mthethwa continued to deny any knowledge of misuse of the fund, including in an affidavit he submitted to the commission.

=== Nkandlagate ===
As Minister of Police, Mthethwa was a central figure in the Nkandlagate controversy, which concerned the use of public funds to make major renovations, labelled security upgrades, to President Zuma's personal residence in Natal. The renovation programme was enabled by a police assessment of security risks at the residence, as well as by Mthethwa's having declared the residence a national key point in 2010. In addition, at the height of the public scandal, Mthethwa attempted to enforce a ban on taking photographs of the residence.

A 2014 investigation by the Public Protector, Thuli Madonsela, concluded that Mthethwa's national key point declaration amounted to improper conduct and maladministration; indeed, of all the political figures criticized by Madonsela, her findings about Mthethwa's conduct were regarded as "most damning". Mthethwa said that he stood by the declaration, but, pursuant to Madonsela's findings, Zuma issued him with a formal reprimand in 2016.

== Minister of Arts and Culture: 2014–2023 ==
In the April 2014 general election, Mthethwa was elected to his third consecutive term in the National Assembly. Although President Zuma retained Mthetwa in his second-term cabinet, he was moved to a new position in an apparent demotion, becoming Minister of Arts and Culture. He served in that portfolio for almost nine years: after the May 2019 general election, Zuma's successor, President Cyril Ramaphosa, retained Mthethwa in an augmented post as Minister of Sports, Arts and Culture. He thereby gained custodianship of the Department of Sports and Recreation, which until then had been the province of an independent ministry.

As minister, Mthethwa was generally unpopular with the South African arts industry. In January 2021, members of the industry circulated a social media petition titled #NathiMustGo after Mthethwa posted a Tweet which was perceived as minimising the harm of the COVID-19 pandemic to South African theatre. News24 nicknamed him the "Minister of Condolences, Congratulations and Other Witchcrafts" for "his general absence and the appearances he makes to congratulate artists who have achieved great accolades (without state support)".

In May 2022, Mthethwa was roundly mocked for his department's proposal to spend R22 million to erect a monumental South African flag in Freedom Park; the Congress of South African Trade Unions called it a "pointless vanity project". Defending the proposal in Parliament, Mthethwa said that the flag would promote social cohesion as "a monument for democracy in this country". Later the same year, he was criticized for his department's proposal to allocate R30 million to the establishment of a new national philharmonic orchestra, subsequently launched as the Mzansi National Philharmonic Orchestra.

During his first term as arts minister, Mthethwa was comfortably re-elected to the ANC National Executive Committee at the party's 54th National Conference in December 2017, and he was re-elected to the National Working Committee after the conference. However, at the party's next elective conference, the 55th National Conference in December 2022, he failed to gain re-election to the National Executive Committee. In a cabinet reshuffle announced after the conference on 6 March 2023, President Ramaphosa sacked Mthethwa from the cabinet, replacing him with Zizi Kodwa. On 15 March 2023, Mthethwa resigned from his seat in the National Assembly.

== Ambassador to France: 2024–2025 ==
In July 2023, News24 reported that President Ramaphosa would give Mthethwa a diplomatic posting. He presented his credentials as South African Ambassador to France on 29 February 2024. In that capacity he was also South Africa's permanent delegate to UNESCO in Paris until his death in 2025.

== Personal life and death ==
Mthethwa was married to Philisiwe Buthelezi, a businesswoman and the chief executive officer of the National Empowerment Fund. They met at an ANC conference in 2009 and married on 16 February 2013 in a French-themed wedding ceremony in Franschhoek.

On 30 September 2025, he was found dead, in what French authorities suspect was a suicide, after falling from the 22nd floor of the Hyatt Regency Paris Étoile hotel. Mthethwa's wife reported him to the French police after receiving a distressing message from him the previous evening. Mthethwa was 58.

In July 2026, a police investigation in Mthethwa's death concluded with a verdict of suicide.
