= Mbulelo Goniwe =

South African politician

Chief Whip of the Majority Party
- In office June 2004 – 14 December 2006
- President: Thabo Mbeki
- Preceded by: Nathi Nhleko
- Succeeded by: Isaac Mogase

Member of the National Assembly
- In office 9 May 1994 – 14 December 2006
- Constituency: Eastern Cape

Personal details
- Born: 25 October 1958 (age 67)
- Citizenship: South Africa
- Party: African National Congress
- Relations: Matthew Goniwe (uncle)

Mbulelo Terence Goniwe (born 25 October 1958) is a South African politician, businessman and former anti-apartheid activist who represented the African National Congress (ANC) in the National Assembly from 1994 to 2006. He was Chief Whip of the Majority Party from June 2004 until December 2006, when he was expelled from the ANC and therefore from the National Assembly.

Goniwe's expulsion was the result of an internal disciplinary process in which the ANC found him guilty of having sexually harassed his administrative assistant. The disciplinary process was re-run in 2007 and, though he was again found guilty, his ANC membership was reinstated. Afterwards he worked full-time as a businessman in the Eastern Cape.

== Early life and activism ==
Goniwe was born on 25 October 1958. He was an anti-apartheid activist and a member of the United Democratic Front (UDF) in Cradock in the former Cape Province. He was also the nephew of UDF leader Matthew Goniwe, one of the Cradock Four who were abducted and murdered by the Security Branch in 1985. It later transpired that the murder of the Cradock Four had followed a recommendation by the State Security Council that Goniwe, his uncle, and Fort Calata should "as a matter of urgency, be permanently removed from society". He was both detained and banned in the mid- and late 1980s.

== Post-apartheid political career ==
=== Parliament: 1994–2004 ===
In South Africa's first post-apartheid elections in 1994, Goniwe was elected to represent the African National Congress (ANC) in the new National Assembly, the lower house of the new South African Parliament. He was re-elected to second and third terms in 1999 and 2004 and he served the Eastern Cape constituency. During his second term, he chaired Parliament's Portfolio Committee on Minerals and Energy, which under his leadership processed the controversial Mineral and Petroleum Resources Development Bill.

=== Majority Chief Whip: 2004–2006 ===
At the outset of the Third Parliament in 2004, Goniwe was initially reappointed to his position as committee chair. However, in June 2004, he was promoted to become Chief Whip of the Majority Party after the incumbent, Nathi Nhleko, resigned. During Goniwe's term, the ANC parliamentary caucus confronted the aftermath of the Travelgate scandal, which saw several ANC MPs face criminal charges for defrauding Parliament, while many others (including Goniwe) were named as debtors in related liquidation inquiries. Goniwe denied allegations that he and the ANC attempted to manage the fallout from the scandal by "sacrificing" junior MPs, encouraging them to accept plea bargains while protecting more senior party figures.

Goniwe was also remembered for his defence of Tony Yengeni, a former Chief Whip himself, who had been convicted of fraud in connection with the Arms Deal. At a gathering before Yengeni was sent to prison in August 2008, Goniwe said, "We are not able to look at the merits or demerits of the case itself, but we can proudly proclaim that Tony Yengeni is one of us. Tony Yengeni is us and we are Tony Yengeni".

==== Undisclosed interests: 2004 ====
In September 2004, the Mail & Guardian reported that Goniwe had failed to disclose his business interests to Parliament as required by law. He was the director of a fishing company and also had an interest in a construction company. The Mail & Guardian quoted him as responding to the reports by saying, "So what? I'm not going to take this shit of yours any more. I may have special reasons that made me not declare. Maybe I wanted to take a different direction in my business." He later said that both companies were dormant. In November, Parliament's ethics committee found him guilty of failing to disclose his interests and fined him R2,000.

==== Leave and expulsion: 2006 ====
On 16 November 2006, the ANC announced that Goniwe would be placed on leave pending the outcome of an internal party disciplinary process arising from a sexual harassment complaint against him. The outcome of the process was Goniwe's expulsion from the ANC, and therefore from his parliamentary seat and from the Chief Whip's office, on 14 December 2006. His seat in Parliament was filled by Henry Fazzie and he was succeeded as Chief Whip by Isaac Mogase.

Nicholas Dawes of the Mail & Guardian suggested that Goniwe's junior colleagues in Parliament did not support him during the sexual harassment scandal – and even actively publicised the charges against him – because of their "animosity" towards him, arising from his role in enforcing the ANC's response to Travelgate. Goniwe said that "people have been actively mobilised in a vilification campaign against me" as part of a "conspiracy" linked to the ANC's upcoming provincial elective conference: Goniwe had been nominated by powerful regional branches to stand for election as ANC Provincial Secretary in the Eastern Cape. He ultimately withdrew his candidacy before the conference took place in December 2006.

== Sexual harassment charges ==
=== Initial hearing: 2006 ===
In mid-November 2006, the Sunday Times reported that a 21-year-old administration assistant had accused Goniwe of sexual harassment after an incident at his house in Acacia Park during a dinner party on 25 October. She alleged that he had asked her to have sex with him and, when she refused, had told her, "I thought you were a real Xhosa girl. How can you say no to your chief whip as if I am an ordinary man?" The woman reported him to the Speaker of the National Assembly and to the chairperson of the ANC's parliamentary caucus, Vytjie Mentor. She told the press that she had received threatening phone calls, demanding that she drop her complaint, since she first reported the incident to an ANC official.

After the allegations were published, the ANC Women's League called publicly for Goniwe's immediate suspension, pending an investigation. He took sick leave and then was placed on extended special leave on 16 November 2006, after the ANC's internal National Disciplinary Committee (NDC) announced that there was prima facie evidence against him and that an internal disciplinary hearing was therefore warranted. The hearing was conducted by the NDC, which was chaired by Kader Asmal and also included Geraldine Fraser-Moleketi, Susan Shabangu, and Luwellyn Landers.

On 14 December 2006, the NDC concluded that Goniwe's evidence was unreliable and that, though he had not made physical contact with the complainant, he had made "overtures, inducements concerning sexual gratification". The NDC therefore found him guilty of abusing his office to obtain sexual advantage and of bringing the ANC into disrepute through unbecoming behaviour. He was acquitted of a third charge of provoking serious divisions in the ANC. As punishment, he was expelled from the party and forbidden to represent the ANC publicly for three years.

=== Disciplinary review: 2007 ===
On 19 May 2007, the ANC's National Executive Committee said that it had reviewed the disciplinary process and had found it to be "procedurally flawed". Goniwe's membership would therefore be reinstated until the hearing was re-run, though he was not restored to his parliamentary seat. The second disciplinary process was chaired by Laloo Chiba and Mosiuoa Lekota. Goniwe was perceived as among the "strongest allies" of President Thabo Mbeki, and Mbeki's critics claimed that the President had intervened to obtain, and then to prolong, the disciplinary review, aiming to ensure that Goniwe would remain a party member long enough to support Mbeki at the ANC's 52nd National Conference in December 2007.

However, the disciplinary process was concluded shortly before the party conference, on 23 November, and Goniwe's conviction on both charges was upheld. His membership of the ANC was suspended for three years, but that sentence was itself suspended for three years, meaning that Goniwe's membership was conditionally reinstated; however, he would not be allowed to hold public office or represent the ANC publicly for three years. He was also sentenced to provide one year of service to the ANC Women's League, performing "such useful tasks as determined and assigned to him" by the league.

=== Aftermath ===
In November 2011, Goniwe told the press that he had served his disciplinary sentence in full and was a businessman and ordinary ANC member in Cradock. His lawyers also said that he had won a lawsuit against the ANC in a default judgement, receiving damages of R1.2 million to compensate for his loss of income after his dismissal on what he perceived as "prejudiced and unfair" grounds. The amount had apparently been increased to R1.7 million after the ANC failed to pay it on time.

== Personal life ==
In October 2006, it was reported that Goniwe was being sued for unpaid child maintenance in respect of two children he had fathered with a teacher in Queenstown, Eastern Cape. That court action continued while Goniwe was facing the sexual harassment charge, and in July 2007 a warrant of arrest was issued after he failed to appear at a maintenance hearing.
