= Motshekga =

Motshekga is a surname. Notable people with the surname include:

- Angie Motshekga (born 1955), South African politician and educator
- Mathole Motshekga (born 1949), South African politician and lawyer
