= Thaba Mufamadi =

South African politician

Member of the National Assembly
- In office 6 May 2009 – 6 May 2014

Personal details
- Born: Thabadiawa Alfred Mufamadi; 11 March 1959 (age 67)
- Party: African National Congress

Thabadiawa Alfred Mufamadi (born 11 March 1959) is a South African businessman and politician from Limpopo Province. A member of the African National Congress (ANC), he served in the Limpopo Executive Council from 1994 to 2006 and in the National Assembly from 2009 to 2014. He is a former member of the ANC National Executive Committee and the former national treasurer of the South African Communist Party (SACP).

== Early life ==
Mufamadi was born on 11 March 1959. He is a relative of ANC stalwart Sydney Mufamadi.

== Government of Limpopo: 1994–2006 ==
Mufamadi began his government career as a representative of the ANC in the Limpopo Provincial Legislature and Limpopo Executive Council. After South Africa's first post-apartheid elections in April 1994, he was the province's inaugural Member of the Executive Council (MEC) for Economic Affairs, Commerce and Industry under Premier Ngoako Ramatlhodi. Ramatlhodi later renamed his position as MEC for Trade and Industry, and in a 1997 reshuffle it was augmented when Mufamadi became additionally responsible for the Limpopo Treasury, a portfolio formerly entrusted to Edgar Mushwana. After several further reshuffles, Mufamadi was serving as MEC for Public Works, under Premier Sello Moloto, when he resigned from the provincial government in 2006.

By the time of his departure from provincial government, Mufamadi was a senior member of the Tripartite Alliance in Limpopo. He had served a term as provincial treasurer of the ANC's Limpopo branch. He also served two five-year terms as a member of the SACP's Central Committee between 1998 and 2007, including one term as its national treasurer from 1998 to 2002.

== National Assembly: 2009–2014 ==
Mufamadi attended the ANC's 52nd National Conference at Polokwane in December 2007, and the conference elected him to a five-year term as a member of the party's National Executive Committee. He received 1,496 votes from around 3,600 voting delegates, making him the 66th-most popular candidate of the 80 ordinary members elected to the committee.

In the next general election in April 2009, Mufamadi was elected to a seat in the National Assembly of South Africa, the lower house of the South African Parliament. After the election, the ANC-led caucus nominated and elected him as chairperson of National Assembly's Standing Committee on Finance.

However, Mufamadi served only one term in Parliament. At the ANC's next national elective conference in December 2012, he was nominated for re-election to the National Executive Committee but failed to win a second term. In the general election that followed in May 2014, he was ranked too low on the ANC's party list to secure re-election to his parliamentary seat. Instead, he was appointed as chairman of the board of the Ports Regulator of South Africa in 2015.

== Business with the state ==
Mufamadi retained a sizable network of business and property interests during his career in government, and these periodically attracted controversy for their involvement in public tenders.

During Mufamadi's time in provincial government, he and former Premier Ramatlhodi were subject to a protracted corruption investigation by the Scorpions, which reportedly began in 2003 after Noseweek suggested that the pair may have received kickbacks in relation to a contract between the Limpopo government and Cash Paymaster Services (CPS) for the administration of social grants in the province. Mufamadi and Ramatlhodi—along with the ANC itself—were alleged to have been beneficiaries of the contract through a development trust that was connected to CPS's black economic empowerment partner. In parallel with the criminal investigation, a CPS competitor launched a lawsuit which resulted in the contract being set aside by the Pretoria High Court in 2005. Mufamadi denied any impropriety, saying that the allegations were "nonsense" and that he had no connection to the relevant companies. The Scorpions reportedly decided in 2008 to bring criminal charges against Ramatlhodi before the charges were vetoed Mokotedi Mpshe of the National Prosecuting Authority.

In early 2012, while Mufamadi was serving in Parliament, press reported that Mufamadi was the chairperson of Manaka Property Investments, a property company that held several lucrative leases with national government departments. Parliament's Joint Committee on Ethics and Members' Interests swiftly cleared Mufamadi on misconduct charges; Mufamadi attested that the transactions with the state were concluded before he was elected to Parliament and that he had not made any representations to the state agencies in connection with the transactions. However, the scandal continued to develop, in part because one of Mufamadi's partners in Manaka was the incumbent Limpopo premier Cassel Mathale. The Special Investigating Unit also announced that it was investigating one of Manaka's state contracts, a lease with the Department of Water Affairs, as part of a broader probe of the department's finances.

In 2013, the Public Protector, Thuli Madonsela, published a report that contained findings of misconduct by Independent Electoral Commission (IEC) chairperson Pansy Tlakula in dealings related to Mufamadi. The Public Protector's investigation centered on the lease for the IEC's headquarters at a property in which Mufamadi's company, Manaka, owned a stake, and the investigation was occasioned by whistleblower allegations that Tlakula had a conflict of interest because of an undisclosed business and personal relationship with Mufamadi—Tlakula and Mufamadi were partners in a mining logistics company and also allegedly had a romantic relationship. The Public Protector found that the IEC headquarters lease had been improperly awarded and that Tlakula's relationship with Mufamadi had created an improper conflict of interest; Tlakula ultimately resigned from the IEC as a result.

In 2025, amaBhungane reported that Mufamadi's company Moepathutse Property Investments had concluded a lease agreement with the Independent Development Trust under dubious circumstances and that the contract had subsequently been shielded from review by ANC politician Sihle Zikalala. Moepathutse denied wrongdoing.
