= Mathole Motshekga =

South African politician and lawyer (born 1949)

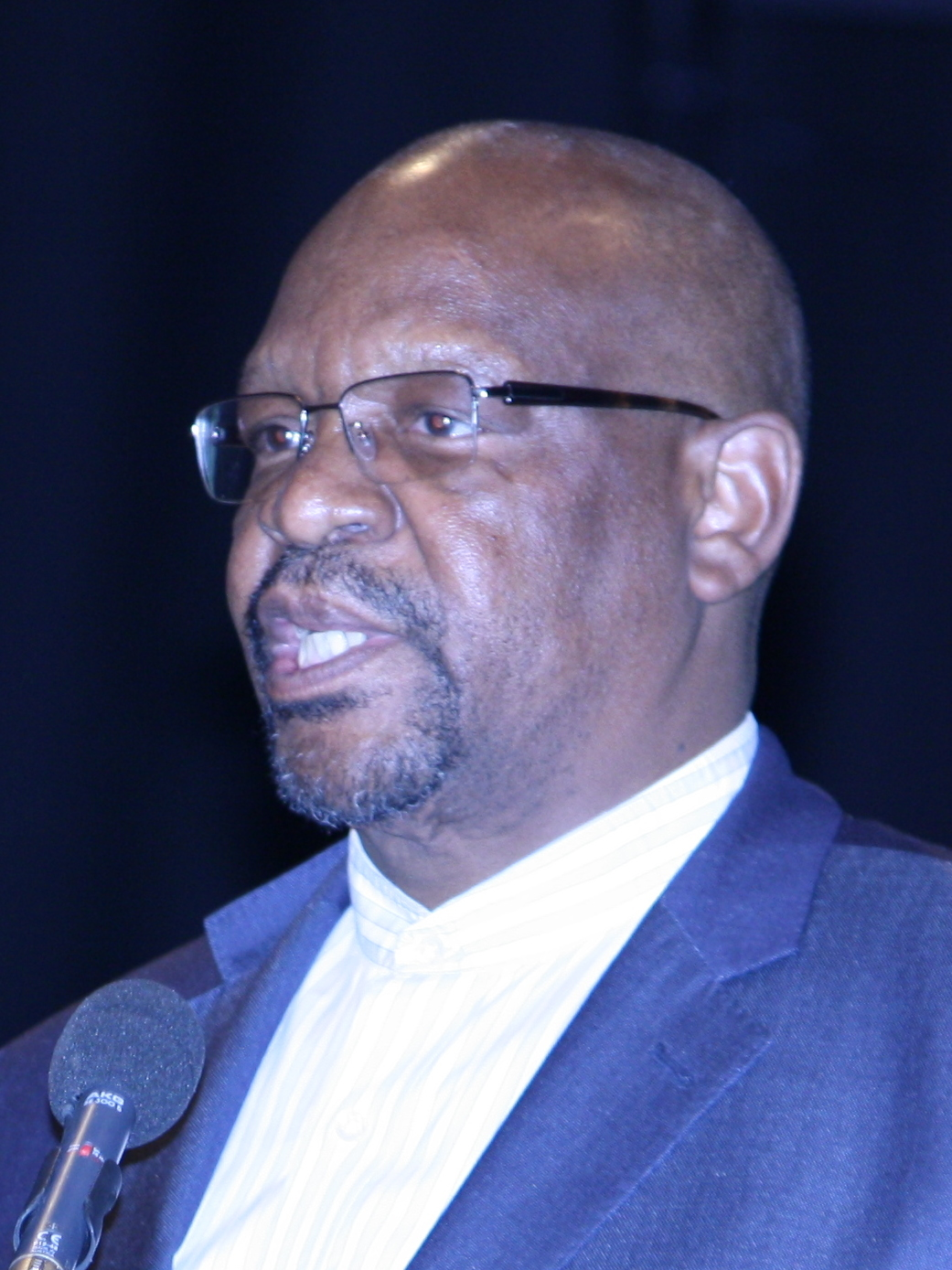
- Motshekga in 2011

Member of the National Assembly
- In office 6 May 2009 – 28 May 2024

Chief Whip of the Majority Party
- In office May 2009 – 20 June 2013
- President: Jacob Zuma
- Preceded by: Mnyamezeli Booi
- Succeeded by: Stone Sizani

2nd Premier of Gauteng
- In office January 1998 – 1999
- Preceded by: Tokyo Sexwale
- Succeeded by: Mbhazima Shilowa

Personal details
- Born: Mathole Serofo Motshekga; 2 April 1949 (age 77) Modjadjiskloof, Transvaal, Union of South Africa
- Party: African National Congress
- Spouse: Angie Motshekga
- Education: University of South Africa; Harvard Law School

Mathole Serofo Motshekga (born 2 April 1949) is a retired South African politician and lawyer. He represented the African National Congress (ANC) in the National Assembly of South Africa between May 2009 and May 2024, during which time he was the Chief Whip of the Majority Party from 2009 to 2013. Before that, he was the second Premier of Gauteng from 1998 to 1999.

Born in Limpopo, Motshekga was an advocate of the Supreme Court of South Africa during apartheid and also taught law at the University of South Africa. In September 1997, he was elected Provincial Chairperson of the ANC in Gauteng, and he succeeded Tokyo Sexwale as Premier in January 1998. However, after the 1999 general election, newly elected President Thabo Mbeki asked Motshekga to resign as Premier. In subsequent years, Motshekga served as an ordinary Member of the Gauteng Provincial Legislature.

After joining the National Assembly in the 2009 general election, Motshekga was the Chief Whip of the Majority Party until June 2013, when he was demoted to an ordinary seat in Parliament. Over the next decade he chaired a number of parliamentary committees. He also served two non-consecutive terms on the ANC National Executive Committee from 2007 to 2012 and from 2017 to 2022.

== Early life and career ==
Motshekga was born on 2 April 1949 in Modjadjiskloof in what later became South Africa's Limpopo province. His father was a ranger on a white-owned farm, and he had younger siblings. He matriculated in 1969 and, after graduation, worked as a clerk at the University of the North.

Thereafter he studied law at the University of South Africa (Unisa), earning a BJuris in 1975. In 1976 he moved to Pretoria to complete his articles for qualification as an attorney. He received an LLB from Unisa in 1978 and enrolled to complete an LLD at the same university. In 1979, he received a scholarship to conduct his doctoral research in Germany, where he conducted solidarity work for the African National Congress (ANC), attempting to mobilise international support for the anti-apartheid cause. He did similar work while visiting the United States the following year.

Upon his return to South Africa, Motshekga was appointed a senior lecturer at Unisa, where he worked from 1984 to 1994. In 1984, he was admitted as an advocate of the Supreme Court of South Africa. He ultimately obtained both his LLD, from Unisa, and an LLM from Harvard Law School. He also maintained his contacts inside the ANC, which in the 1980s was based in Lusaka, Zambia. When the ANC was unbanned by the apartheid government in 1990, Motshekga was appointed to the interim leadership corps of the ANC in the PWV region around Pretoria, then headed by Tokyo Sexwale.

== Provincial political career ==
=== ANC Provincial Chairperson: 1997–2000 ===
At the time of South Africa's first post-apartheid election in 1994, Motshekga was Deputy Provincial Chairperson of the ANC branch in the country's new Gauteng province. He held that position until September 1997, when ANC Provincial Chairperson Tokyo Sexwale resigned and Motshekga was elected to succeed him. His election followed a heated succession battle with multiple rounds of voting: Motshekga defeated Amos Masondo and then, in the final round of voting, beat Frank Chikane with 343 votes to Chikane's 179.

=== Premier of Gauteng: 1998–1999 ===
Motshekga likewise succeeded Sexwale as Premier of Gauteng in January 1998 when Sexwale vacated that post. During his tenure, he was subject to an internal investigation by the ANC. President Thabo Mbeki asked him to resign as Premier in April 1999, shortly after Mbeki took office in a general election. Motshekga's ousting from the government office led to division inside the provincial ANC, and the Motshekga-led ANC Provincial Executive Committee was disbanded by the national party leadership in 2000, prematurely ending Motshekga's term as ANC Provincial Chairperson.

In subsequent years, Motshekga expanded his business interests. He was also elected to return to the Gauteng Provincial Legislature as an ordinary member in the 2004 general election.

== National political career ==
At the ANC's 52nd National Conference in December 2007, Motshekga was elected to a five-year term on the ANC National Executive Committee (NEC), the party's top executive organ; by number of votes received, he ranked 53rd of the 80 candidates elected.

=== ANC Chief Whip: 2009–2013 ===
In the 2009 general election, Motshekga was elected as a Member of the National Assembly (NA), the lower house of the South African Parliament; at the same time, he was appointed Chief Whip of the ANC, the majority party, in the NA. He served in that position until June 2013, becoming the party's longest-serving Chief Whip.

However, Motshekga was removed as Chief Whip before the end of his term because, at the ANC's next national conference in December 2012, he narrowly failed to gain re-election to the ANC NEC. The NEC said this situation was incongruent with a party resolution adopted in 2008 which required the Chief Whip to sit on the NEC. The ANC therefore removed Motshekga as Chief Whip on 20 June 2013, replacing him with Stone Sizani.

=== Legislator: 2013–2024 ===
At a later date, after his removal as Chief Whip, Motshekga was in any case co-opted onto the ANC NEC. At the party's 54th National Conference in December 2017, he was democratically elected to another five-year term on the body, although he was not nominated to stand for re-election at the 55th National Conference in December 2022.

Simultaneously, Motshekga remained an ordinary Member of Parliament, and he was re-elected to his seat in 2014 and 2019. In addition, in 2014 he was appointed to represent the ANC as an NA delegate to the Judicial Service Commission. He served on a number of parliamentary committees, including as Chairperson of the Portfolio Committee on Justice and Correctional Services (from June 2014 to August 2018) and Chairperson of the Joint Standing Committee on the Financial Management of Parliament (from August 2018 to May 2019). He publicly criticised President Jacob Zuma towards the end of Zuma's presidential term, and he was subsequently viewed as a supporter of Zuma's successor, President Cyril Ramaphosa.

He did not stand for re-election to his parliamentary seat in the 2024 general election.

== Balobedu royal family ==
By the time of the inauguration of Makobo Modjadji VI as Rain Queen in 2003, Motshekga was an adviser to the royal family of Limpopo's Balobedu people. After Makobo Modjadji died in 2005, Motshekga raised her only daughter, Princess Masalanabo, who at the time of the queen's death was still an infant. This led to a custody battle and ultimately to a rift with the royal family. In 2019, the family accused Motshekga of attempting to turn the princess against them and "hijack" the throne. In 2022, Motshekga took the family to court in a bid to challenge the coronation of Masalanabo's brother, Prince Lukukela, as Balobedu monarch; he claimed that Masalanabo was the rightful heir to the throne.

== Personal life ==
Motshekga believes in a religion which he calls Karaism and describes as an indigenous African religion. He is married to cabinet minister Angie Motshekga, with whom he has a son, Kabelo, and grandchildren.
