= Nathi Nhleko =

South African politician (born 1964)

Member of the National Assembly
- In office 27 February 2018 – 7 May 2019
- Constituency: KwaZulu-Natal
- In office 9 May 1994 – 1 September 2005

Minister of Public Works
- In office 31 March 2017 – 26 February 2018
- President: Jacob Zuma
- Deputy: Jeremy Cronin
- Preceded by: Thulas Nxesi
- Succeeded by: Thulas Nxesi

Minister of Police
- In office 26 May 2014 – 31 March 2017
- President: Jacob Zuma
- Deputy: Maggie Sotyu
- Preceded by: Nathi Mthethwa
- Succeeded by: Fikile Mbalula

Chief Whip of the Majority Party
- In office May 2002 – June 2004
- Speaker: Frene Ginwala
- Preceded by: Nosiviwe Mapisa-Nqakula
- Succeeded by: Mbulelo Goniwe

Personal details
- Born: Nkosinathi Phiwayinkosi Thamsanqa Nhleko; 10 October 1964 (age 62) Ndabayakhe, Natal Province; South Africa
- Party: Umkhonto weSizwe Party (since 2024)
- Other political affiliations: African National Congress (until 2024)
- Education: Leeds Metropolitan University

Nkosinathi Phiwayinkosi Thamsanqa Nhleko (born 10 October 1964) is a South African politician and former trade unionist from KwaZulu-Natal. He was the Minister of Police and Minister of Public Works in the second cabinet of President Jacob Zuma. In March 2024, he resigned from the African National Congress (ANC) and became the national organiser for uMkhonto weSizwe Party (MKP); a role which he held until 4 August 2026.

Raised in Empangeni, Nhleko rose to prominence as the general secretary of the Transport and General Workers' Union from 1989 to 1993. He was elected to the first post-apartheid Parliament in May 1994 and represented the ANC in the National Assembly until September 2005. During that time, he served as Chief Whip of the Majority Party from 2002 to 2004. From 2005 to 2014, he took a hiatus from legislative politics to work in business and public administration, including as correctional services commissioner in Kwa-Zulu-Natal and as director-general in the Department of Labour.

In May 2014, Nhleko returned to national government as Minister of Police, an office he held until March 2017. During this period, he made several controversial decisions, including recommending that Zuma should be absolved of personal liability in Nkandlagate. After a cabinet reshuffle, he served as Minister of Public Works from March 2017 until February 2018, when he was sacked by Zuma's successor, President Cyril Ramaphosa. Thereafter he served as a backbencher in the National Assembly until the 2019 general election.

== Early life and education ==
Nhleko was born on 10 October 1964 in Ndabayakhe, a village near KwaMbonambi in the former Natal Province. He grew up in Matshana in nearby Empangeni. From 1982 to 1986, he attended Amangwe High School in Matshana, where he was active in student politics, but he did not matriculate: he failed his exams twice and missed a third sitting because he had been detained by the apartheid police.

After the end of apartheid, Nhleko nonetheless attended university; he completed a diploma in labour law at the Graduate Institute of Management and Technology in 2007 and then a master's degree in leadership and change management at Leeds Metropolitan University in 2012.

== Trade union activism ==
Nhleko became active in the trade union movement in the 1980s. He rose through the ranks of the Transport and General Workers' Union, an affiliate of the Congress of South African Trade Unions (Cosatu), to become general secretary from 1989 to 1993.

== National Assembly: 1994–2005 ==
In South Africa's first post-apartheid elections in 1994, Nhleko was elected to the National Assembly, the lower house of the South African Parliament. He represented the African National Congress (ANC) but was nominated as a candidate by Cosatu, the ANC's Tripartite Alliance partner. Over the next two legislative terms, he held several positions in the assembly, including as a delegate to the Judicial Service Commission, chairperson of the Portfolio Committee on Public Service and Administration, and chairperson of the ANC parliamentary caucus.

In May 2002, Nhleko was appointed as Chief Whip of the Majority Party after the incumbent, Nosiviwe Mapisa-Nqakula, became Deputy Minister of Home Affairs. The following year, the Mail & Guardian named him as one of 20 politicians who would "emerge as key figures in our public life over the next 10 years"; according to the newspaper, he had "made a favourable impact as an efficient backroom organiser" in the National Assembly.

However, on 24 June 2004, shortly after the 2004 general election, the ANC announced that, with immediate effect, Nhleko would be replaced as chief whip by Mbulelo Goniwe. His demotion to the parliamentary backbenches was viewed as surprising, and he did not provide an explanation beyond saying that he had been "redeployed" by the national leadership of the ANC. After a year as a backbencher, Nhleko resigned from the National Assembly on 1 September 2005, ceding his seat to Vusi Nhlapo. The Mail & Guardian lamented his departure from Parliament, saying that he (along with Ned Kekana, Vusi Mavimbela, and Raenette Taljaard) had formerly "seemed poised to make it a site of interesting politics".

== Political hiatus: 2005–2014 ==
After his departure from legislative politics, Nhleko ran his own company. In 2006, he was appointed as regional commissioner of correctional services in Kwa-Zulu-Natal, in which capacity he oversaw Schabir Shaik's release on medical parole. He went on to serve as deputy municipal manager in Umhlathuze Local Municipality and as head of the specialised anti-corruption unit in the national Department of Public Service and Administration.

=== Labour director-general: 2011–2013 ===
On 24 May 2011, the Department of Labour announced that Nhleko had been appointed as director-general, succeeding Jimmy Manyi. During his two years in that position, he was also rumoured to be the frontrunner to succeed Bheki Cele as National Police Commissioner, though he did not ultimately get the job.

In November 2013, the Star reported that he had been removed unceremoniously from his director-general post "following a breakdown in the relationship between him and Labour Minister Mildred Oliphant". Nhleko agreed that "challenges" between him and Oliphant "have made the relationship to be irreconcilable to an extent that I do not believe we can continue to work together". According to the Mail & Guardian's sources, the centre of the row between Oliphant and Nhleko was the Compensation Fund, an agency under the department, and in particular the fact that Nhleko had launched a forensic investigation into the fund that was subsequently blocked by Oliphant. He left Oliphant's department on secondment to the Department of Public Service and Administration, pending a determination on his employment by the president; he ended up serving in the compliance department in the office of Lindiwe Sisulu, then the Minister of Public Service and Administration.

Nhleko's activities in the Department of Labour were later the subject of a large civil lawsuit, launched by a founding member of the Workers Association Union. The complainant, Thebe Maswabi, alleged that WAU had been established with the encouragement and funding of government agents, including Nhleko, who wanted the union to compete with the Association of Mineworkers and Construction Union, which was hostile to the ANC.

== Minister of Police: 2014–2017 ==
After the 2014 general election, President Jacob Zuma announced that Nhleko would join his second-term cabinet as Minister of Police. During a parliamentary debate on Nhleko's first budget vote speech two months later, Dianne Kohler Barnard of the opposition Democratic Alliance wrongly accused Nhleko of having "left school somewhere in standard nine [and having] no further education"; she later said that she'd gotten this information from the Who's Who website.

Early in his tenure as minister, Nhleko made controversial changes in the leadership of the Hawks, suspending Anwa Dramat as the unit's head and then appointing Berning Ntlemeza to replace Dramat. The Pretoria High Court later declared Ntlemeza's appointment invalid after an application by the Helen Suzman Foundation. Nhleko also established a multi-disciplinary police task force to investigate and seek to prevent political killings in South Africa, announced in June 2016.

=== Nkandlagate ===
However, Nhleko received the most attention as minister for his actions during the prolonged public controversy about security upgrades at Zuma's Nkandla residence. Following the Public Protector's report on the saga, which found Zuma personally liable to pay for the upgrades, Nhleko was appointed to conduct the government's own investigation. On 28 May 2015, he presented his findings to Parliament, recommending that Zuma should be absolved entirely and that the state should bear the cost of the upgrades. According to Nhleko, all of the upgrades – including a cattle kraal and particularly controversial fire pool – were justifiable and even necessary security features. The National Assembly adopted Nhleko's report in August 2015, although the Constitutional Court later ruled, in Economic Freedom Fighters v Speaker of the National Assembly, that the assembly had violated the Constitution in endorsing Nhleko's recommendations over those of the Public Protector.

In the interim, Nhleko elaborated on his defence of Zuma in other public forums, leading a Mail & Guardian editorial to excoriate him for "merrily continu[ing] to make a fool of himself as he peddles lies and distortions to keep Zuma personally unaccountable for state spending at Nkandla". Nhleko had been viewed as part of Zuma's "inner circle" for some time, and by March 2016, City Press reported that Nhleko had become one of Zuma's "most dependable allies".

=== Conflict with Robert McBride ===
In March 2015, Nhleko suspended Robert McBride as the head of the Independent Police Investigative Directorate. McBride challenged the decision and won in September 2016, when the Constitutional Court ruled that Nhleko's decision was invalid. After the judgement was handed down, the Democratic Alliance called for Nhleko to resign.

Tensions between Nhleko and McBride remained. In December 2018, after Nhleko had left the ministry, McBride alleged in an affidavit to the Zondo Commission that Nhleko had been involved in the establishment of 16-member covert paramilitary squad, recruited in 2016 and trained in the People's Republic of China. Nhleko had apparently helped the members of the squad gain employment in law enforcement agencies, including the Hawks and police crime intelligence. The Daily Maverick said that he approached the newspaper to demand that they retract publication of McBride's allegations. According to McBride, the members of the squad, mostly from northern KwaZulu-Natal, had been recruited through Indoni, a youth moral regeneration movement founded by Nhleko's partner, Nomcebo Mthembu. There had earlier been reports that Indoni had done business with Nhleko's ministry. Following McBride's testimony, Nhleko himself was summoned to testify before the Zondo Commission; he concluded his testimony by maintaining that, "I always acted in the best interest of both the law and the public."

== Minister of Public Works: 2017–2018 ==
Just after midnight in the early hours of 31 March 2017, Zuma announced a controversial cabinet reshuffle that saw Nhleko appointed as Minister of Public Works. Nhleko announced a target of creating 1.4 million job opportunities in the 2017/2018 financial year through the department's extended public works programme and other schemes. However, he remained in the portfolio for less than a year: on 26 February 2018, he was sacked and replaced by Thulas Nxesi. He was sacked by Cyril Ramaphosa, who had recently replaced Zuma as President of South Africa.

Until then, Nhleko had served in the cabinet from outside Parliament; the day after Ramaphosa's reshuffle, on 27 February, he was sworn in to an ANC seat in the National Assembly, replacing Makhosi Khoza, who had been expelled from the party. As an ordinary Member of Parliament, Nhleko joined the Standing Committee on Finance, where he served until he left the National Assembly in the 2019 general election.

== Umkhonto we Sizwe Party: 2024–present ==
In March 2024, Nhleko retired his ANC membership. In a resignation letter printed in the Mail & Guardian, he said that the party's "current values and principles are not aligned to mine". The letter reserved special criticism for ANC secretary-general Fikile Mbalula, who had recently disowned Nhleko's handling of Nkandlagate and whom Nhleko accused of "bankruptcy, lunacy, and [a] defunct manner of thinking". He also criticised what he described as the ANC government's "dismantling" and privatisation of state-owned enterprises. Mbalula responded to the letter by redoubling his criticism of Nhleko, Tweeting that, "Indeed our revolution did produce villains," and the ANC's KwaZulu-Natal provincial secretary, Bheki Mtolo, was quoted as having said, "It's good riddance, it's long overdue."

Three weeks later, Nhleko was appointed as national organiser for former President Zuma's newly established Umkhonto we Sizwe Party (MK Party). He held that role during the party's 2024 general election campaign, and, along with Tom Moyane and Sihle Ngubane, he was a member of the party's delegation to the post-election coalition negotiations.

On 4 August 2026, it was announced that Jacob Zuma had replaced Nhleko as MKP National Chair, and appointed Mxolisi Phakathi in his place.

== Personal life ==
Nhleko is a member of the eBuhleni faction of the Shembe Church. He married Nothando Nkomo in a traditional Shembe wedding at the University of Zululand in November 2014, though the couple reportedly separated in 2016.

Trade union offices
Preceded by Jane Barratt	General Secretary of the Transport and General Workers' Union; 1989–1994	Succeeded by Randall Howard
