= Chief Whip of the Majority Party =

Chief whip of the lower house of the Parliament of South Africa

Chief Whip of the Majority Party of the National Assembly of South Africa
- Incumbent; Mdumiseni Ntuli since 14 June 2024
- Style: The Honourable
- Nominator: Majority party in the National Assembly
- Appointer: Speaker of the National Assembly of South Africa
- Inaugural holder: 1994
- First holder: Makhenkesi Stofile
- Deputy: Deputy Chief Whip of the Majority Party
- Salary: R1,792,595.00 (since 2024)
- Website: www.parliament.gov.za/chief-whips

The Chief Whip of the Majority Party is an official office bearer in the National Assembly of South Africa. As of June 2024, Mdumiseni Ntuli of the African National Congress (ANC) serves as the Chief Whip of the Majority Party, replacing Pemmy Majodina, who was only the second woman to hold the office.

== Appointment ==
After being nominated by the majority party in the National Assembly, the speaker approves the appointment.

== Functions ==
Although elections to the National Assembly are held using a system of proportional representation and Members of Parliament of the majority party are expected to vote in the desired way of party leadership, the position of Chief Whip was retained.

The Chief Whip of the Majority Party oversees the whipping system of the majority party and ensures that Members of Parliament belonging to the majority party attend plenary sessions and vote on legislation in the National Assembly. The Chief Whip, in discussion with the Chief Whip of the largest opposition party, is responsible for the programme of the National Assembly. The Chief Whip is also responsible for approving the budgets of parliamentary committees after consulting with the Chairperson of Committees.

== Lists of Chief Whips ==
Since the creation of the National Assembly in 1994, the position has been held by a member of the African National Congress, the majority party in the National Assembly.

Name	Entered office	Left office	Party
Makhenkesi Stofile	1994	1997	ANC
Max Sisulu	1997	1998	ANC
Tony Yengeni	1998	2001	ANC
Nosiviwe Mapisa-Nqakula	2001	2002	ANC
Nathi Nhleko	2002	2004	ANC
Mbulelo Goniwe	2004	2006	ANC
Isaac Mogase	2007	2008	ANC
Nathi Mthethwa	2008	2008	ANC
Mnyamezeli Booi	2008	2009	ANC
Mathole Motshekga	2009	2013	ANC
Stone Sizani	2013	2016	ANC
Jackson Mthembu	2016	2019	ANC
Pemmy Majodina	2019	2024	ANC
Mdumiseni Ntuli	2024	present	ANC
