= Fikile Mbalula =

South African politician (born 1971)

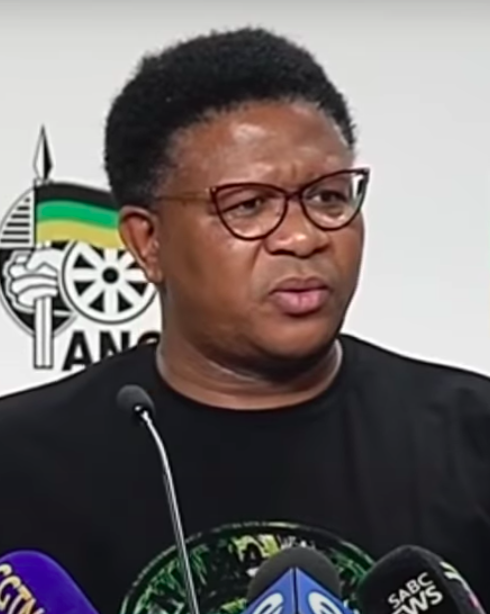
- Mbalula in January 2019

Secretary-General of the African National Congress
- Incumbent
- Assumed office 19 December 2022
- President: Cyril Ramaphosa
- Deputy: Maropene Ramokgopa; Nomvula Mokonyane
- Preceded by: Ace Magashule

Member of the National Assembly
- In office 22 May 2019 – 6 March 2023
- Succeeded by: Motalane Monakedi
- In office 6 May 2009 – 26 February 2018
- Succeeded by: Ellen Molekane
- Constituency: National list

President of the African National Congress Youth League
- In office August 2004 – April 2008
- Deputy: Rubben Mohlaloga
- Preceded by: Malusi Gigaba
- Succeeded by: Julius Malema
Ministerial offices 2009‍–‍2023
Minister of Transport
In office 30 May 2019 – 6 March 2023
President	Cyril Ramaphosa
Deputy	Sindisiwe Chikunga
Preceded by	Blade Nzimande
Succeeded by	Sindisiwe Chikunga
Minister of Police
In office 31 March 2017 – 26 February 2018
President	Jacob Zuma
Preceded by	Nathi Nhleko
Succeeded by	Bheki Cele
Minister of Sport and Recreation
In office 1 November 2010 – 31 March 2017
President	Jacob Zuma
Preceded by	Makhenkesi Stofile
Succeeded by	Thulas Nxesi
Deputy Minister of Police
In office May 2009 – October 2010
President	Jacob Zuma
Minister	Nathi Mthethwa
Preceded by	Susan Shabangu
Succeeded by	Maggie Sotyu

Personal details
- Born: Fikile April Mbalula; 8 April 1971 (age 55) Botshabelo, Orange Free State, South Africa
- Party: African National Congress
- Spouse: Nozuko Mbalula
- Relatives: Jabu Mbalula (brother)
- Occupation: Politician
- Nicknames: Mbaks; Vutha

Fikile April Mbalula (born 8 April 1971) is a South African politician and current secretary-general of the African National Congress (ANC) since December 2022. He was a cabinet minister between 2010 and 2023, most proximately as Minister of Transport from 2019 to 2023.

Mbalula rose to national political prominence as the President of the ANC Youth League between 2004 and 2008. During this period, he became an outspoken supporter of Jacob Zuma, whom he supported at the ANC's 2007 Polokwane conference. At the same conference, he was elected to the ANC National Executive Committee for the first time and became the party's head of elections and organisation, in which capacity he coordinated its campaign in the 2009 general election. He continued to play a central role in the ANC's subsequent election campaigns.

After Mbalula joined the National Assembly in May 2009, he was appointed as Deputy Minister of Police by Zuma, who was newly elected as President of South Africa. He went on to serve in Zuma's cabinet as Minister of Sport and Recreation from 2010 to 2017 and as Minister of Police from 2017 to 2018. He maintained a prominent public profile in both positions, even as his standing in the ANC suffered due to his falling out with Zuma and his unsuccessful bid to be elected as ANC Secretary-General in 2012.

Although he was initially excluded from the cabinet of Zuma's successor, President Cyril Ramaphosa, Mbalula returned as Minister of Transport from May 2019 to March 2023. He left government in order to take up his full-time position as ANC Secretary-General, which he won at the ANC's 55th National Conference in December 2022.

== Early life and career ==
Mbalula was born on 8 April 1971 on a farm near Botshabelo, a township outside Bloemfontein in the former Orange Free State. He grew up in the township and entered politics through the Botshabelo Youth Congress, which he led between 1986 and 1987. He also joined the local United Democratic Front in 1989.

He was still a teenager when the African National Congress (ANC) was unbanned by the apartheid government in 1990, and later the same year he became active in the ANC's youth structures. When the ANC Youth League (ANCYL) was re-established inside South Africa, he rose through its ranks, becoming Regional Secretary in 1991 and Provincial Secretary in 1994. At the same time, he trained in psychotherapy as a counsellor.

== Early political career ==
=== National ANCYL: 1996–2004 ===
In 1996, Mbalula ascended to national office in the ANCYL as the league's secretary for political education. He held that office until 1998, when he was elected as national Secretary-General of the league, serving under ANCYL President Malusi Gigaba. He and Gigaba were both re-elected – in Mbalula's case unopposed – in April 2001. The pair were apparently close confidantes: by 2002, they discussed their political ambitions with other ANCYL members, identifying Mbalula as an ideal future ANC Secretary-General and Gigaba as an ANC President.

=== ANCYL President: 2004–2008 ===
Reportedly in line with Mbalula and Gigaba's plans, Mbalula succeeded Gigaba as ANCYL President at the league's next elective conference, held in Johannesburg in August 2004. His candidacy was unopposed, and he was viewed as an attractive candidate because he could straddle the league's "old guard" and its new generation of younger students. During his single term as ANCYL President, Mbalula was also President of the International Union of Socialist Youth in 2004.

Mbalula's presidency elevated him to national prominence and his tenure was controversial. His politics have been described as populist, and he attracted media attention for his public statements. His critics accused him of "eroding authority and decorum" in the ANC in a manner that "changed the culture of the league" and set a precedent for his successors. Also controversial was his close relationship with Brett Kebble, a businessman and prolific political donor. Mbalula was a pallbearer at Kebble's funeral in 2005, and Kebble's biographer, Mandy Wiener, claimed that Kebble had been Mbalula's political mentor, frequently hosting him – and even coaching him – over Johnnie Walker Blue Label at his home in Atholl, Johannesburg. Mbalula personally was a member of a trust that co-owned Lembede Investment Holdings, an ANCYL-linked investment company that did business with Kebble.

In April 2008, the Mail & Guardian accused Mbalula of plagiarising an article he wrote for the November 2007 issue of Umrambulo, the ANC newsletter. The article, entitled "A Hurdle Race Rigged Against the Poor", apparently bore remarkable similarity to a 2002 report by Oxfam. Mbalula said that he had never read or seen the Oxfam report.

==== Polokwane conference ====
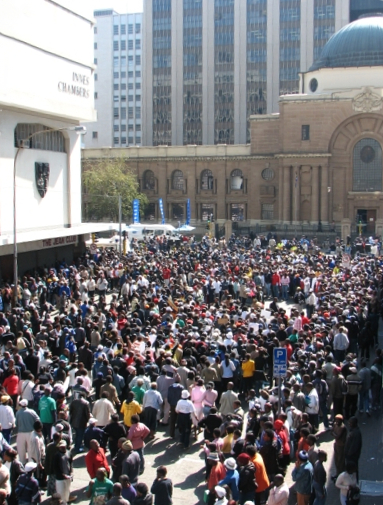
A crowd of supporters, protesters, and onlookers outside the Johannesburg High Court during Jacob Zuma's rape trial

Mbalula was formerly viewed as a supporter of incumbent President Thabo Mbeki – he was a former protegé of the late ANCYL stalwart Peter Mokaba, who was an Mbeki loyalist – but by early 2005 he had "switched sides" to support Mbeki's deputy and foremost rival, Deputy President Jacob Zuma. In February 2005, for example, he said publicly that the ANC Women's League was "a bunch of holy cows" whose opposition to Zuma's rise would be judged by "the march of history". During 2005 and 2006, Mbalula was the figurehead of the ANCYL's support for Zuma during Zuma's corruption trial and rape trial; in particular, he was reportedly the key figure in "orchestrating" the ANCYL's energetic demonstrations outside the courthouse, and he sometimes addressed the crowd there. An American diplomatic cable, leaked later during Cablegate, claimed that Mbalula had not initially wanted to defend Zuma during his criminal trials but had faced pressure to do so from within the ANCYL.

In any case, Mbalula became "an important 'dog of war'" in Zuma's campaign to be elected as ANC president. Under Mbalula, the national ANCYL opposed Mbeki's bid for a third term in the ANC presidency; Mbalula said Mbeki had "played his role". He also said that the league would continue to support Zuma even if he faced further criminal charges. Indeed, when the ANC's 52nd National Conference opened in Polokwane in December 2007, Mbalula addressed a rally – an unprecedented display at an ANC conference – of Zuma supporters.

In the party elections, where Zuma triumphed, Mbalula was himself elected to the ANC National Executive Committee (NEC), of which he had formerly been an ex officio member in his ANCYL capacity. He received 2,116 votes from the roughly 4,000 delegates, making him the 15th-most popular candidate of the 80 ordinary members elected. He was also elected to the ANC's influential 20-member National Working Committee and was appointed to head the NEC's newly established subcommittee on organisation-building and campaigns.

==== Succession ====
By the time of the Polokwane conference, Mbalula was over the age of 35 and therefore technically ineligible for membership in the ANCYL. His successor, firebrand Zuma supporter Julius Malema, was elected at a league conference at the University of the Free State in April 2008. Malema's ascension had Mbalula's support, while the other contender, Saki Mofokeng, was reportedly supported by Sihle Zikalala, the outgoing ANCYL Secretary-General.

=== Luthuli House: 2008–2009 ===
After leaving the ANCYL, Mbalula worked full-time in organising and campaigns from the ANC's headquarters at Luthuli House in Johannesburg. He ran the ANC's campaign in the 2009 general election, with Zuma as the party's presidential candidate; the campaign was considered highly successful, especially in its appeal to young voters. Indeed, his organisational prowess has often been admired, with Mbalula described as "a talented fixer, spin doctor, organiser and campaigner" and as a "keen strategist" and moderniser.

During this period, Mbalula remained in the public eye, including as a persistent critic of former President Mbeki. He called Mbeki "aggrieved" and "bitter" in a February 2009 interview with the Mail & Guardian, and in April that year he published an open letter in which he held Mbeki responsible for the establishment of the Congress of the People, a recent ANC breakaway. In his letter, Mbalula wrote to Mbeki:

Mandela handed you a vibrant and united ANC, yet at the twilight of your presidency, you chose to betray everything that Mandela and those that came before him stood for, struggled for, and laid down their lives for. In a moment of intoxication with power, you forgot Madiba's wise counsel and allowed our glorious movement to stumble on the edge of an abyss. When your cabal was finally defeated in Polokwane because of its actions and underhanded tactics at securing a third term for you as a president of the ANC, they went into an elaborate conspiratorial mode, famously dubbed 'the fight-back strategy' which clearly carried your blessing... It is a sad reality that the phenomenon we are dealing with today is a result of your actions of conniving, manipulating people and advancing politics of patronage. Despite the fact that you were a democratically elected president, you chose to run both the organisation and the country with a cabal which sought to commandeer everyone along your thinking and vision, which at times ran contrary to what the ANC stood for.

Mbalula defended his words after President Motlanthe called the letter "unbecoming".

== Career in government ==
=== Deputy Minister of Police: 2009–2010 ===
In the April 2009 election, Mbalula himself was elected to an ANC seat in the National Assembly, the lower house of the South African Parliament. He was believed to be in line for a cabinet post, and newly elected President Zuma appointed him as Deputy Minister of Police under Minister Nathi Mthethwa. He was one of the youngest deputy ministers in the government, and he quickly gained a public profile, sometimes appearing even to overshadow Mthethwa.

Focusing on visible policing, Mbalula announced several high-profile initiatives, including the community-led Operation Wanya Totsi and a ministerial effort to amend Section 49 of the Criminal Procedure Act to allow police to use lethal force even when not strictly necessary. In the latter case, Mbalula garnered political attention for encouraging police to "Shoot the bastards". He also spearheaded a project to re-introduce military ranks and discipline in the post-apartheid South African Police Service, inviting harsh criticism from ANC stalwart Kader Asmal, who said:

The new administration is referring to the militarisation of the police. I have this former head of the youth league [Mbalula] who aspires to be secretary general of the ANC. Ha, really, I hope I won't be alive. He said we must militarise the police. We spent days and days in 1991 to get away from the idea of a militarised police force. Extraordinary. This is a kind of craziness all of us have to take into account.

Within months of Mbalula's appointment, the media observed tensions between him and his minister, with Mthethwa resenting Mbalula's popularity and Mbalula resenting Mthethwa's promotion ahead of him – Mthethwa had been junior to Mbalula in the ANCYL, serving as national organiser while Mbalula was President. The Sunday Times also suggested that Mbalula had become disillusioned with President Zuma when Zuma failed to give him a full ministerial post after the election. Asked about his relationship with the minister, Mbalula conceded that they sometimes disagreed, saying that he was nobody's "ball boy" and that, "I’m a deputy minister, but a deputy with substance."

=== Minister of Sport and Recreation: 2010–2017 ===
On 31 October 2010, in a major cabinet reshuffle, Mbalula was appointed as Minister of Sport and Recreation. His promotion apparently followed a "heavy-handed campaign" by the ANCYL, though the portfolio itself was considered relatively junior. Upon taking office, he said that he would prioritise the transformation of sport, including through the promotion of school sport and community sport and through the eradication of corruption in sports bodies. In parallel with the government position, he remained the ANC's internal head of elections, and he coordinated the party's campaign in the 2011 local elections.

Also in 2011, Mbalula's ministry drafted a national sport and recreation plan, which included a transformation charter. He has been complimented for his attempts to promote sports development, which were pursued particularly through compulsory physical education and sport in schools nationwide. The ministry's school-based initiatives, implemented in collaboration with the Department of Basic Education, were viewed as largely successful.

Others said that Mbalula advocated for sports as a means of promoting national social cohesion. He argued publicly that South Africa should bid to host the 2020 Olympics and, later, the 2024 Olympics. Under his leadership, Durban became a host city for the 2022 Commonwealth Games, though it later withdrew. He also garnered attention as a harsh critic of Bafana Bafana, the national soccer team: for example, he called the team "a bunch of losers" after they were eliminated during the group stage of the 2014 African Nations Championship, and he said they were a "disgrace" and "embarrassing" when they failed to qualify for the 2012 Africa Cup of Nations after misreading the eligibility rules.

He frequently threatened sporting bodies with harsh penalties if they did not ensure greater diversity among sportsmen, threatening in 2014 to hike race quotas across all national teams and threatening in 2016 to withdraw the right of certain bodies to host international tournaments. In addition, in October 2011, he appointed an inquiry into the affairs of Cricket South Africa; chaired by retired Judge Chris Nicholson, the panel recommended the suspension of the body's head, Gerald Majola, among other things. These moves were generally welcomed, though they were sometimes viewed as a form of electioneering by Mbalula.

==== Mangaung conference ====
After he entered the sports ministry, Mbalula's relationship with President Zuma continued to deteriorate. In particular, there had long been reports that Mbalula aspired to be elected as ANC Secretary-General at the party's next internal elections, to be held at the 53rd National Conference in December 2012; Julius Malema and his ANCYL, in particular, gave early and outspoken support to Mbalula's candidacy. This aspiration brought him into competition with the incumbent Secretary-General, Gwede Mantashe, who was a close ally of Zuma's.

By June 2011, there were reports that Mbalula's allies were actively campaigning on his behalf in the Western Cape. He stood on a ticket aligned to ANC Deputy President Kgalema Motlanthe, who challenged Zuma's incumbency in the ANC presidency. In October 2012, in an interview with the Star, Mbalula said that Zuma's faction had invited him to join the Zuma-aligned slate of candidates but that he had declined the offer, because, "I have no time for Zuma. He has caused his own problems. He marries every week. He is building a mansion in Nkandla." He was subsequently strongly rebuked by Zuma's supporters.

The elective conference was held in Mangaung in December 2012, and Mbalula ultimately became one of its "biggest losers", along with others who had sought to unseat Zuma. Zuma comfortably retained the ANC presidency, and Mantashe retained the Secretary-General post in a landslide, receiving 3,058 votes to Mbalula's 908. Mbalula also failed to gain re-election as an ordinary member of the NEC, and Nomvula Mokonyane replaced him as the ANC's head of organisation-building and campaigns. However, he remained in his government ministry, was highly ranked on the ANC's party list in the next general election (sixth nationally), and returned to the NEC by co-option in March 2015. He was also involved in the ANC's campaign in the 2016 local elections.

==== Alleged Gupta influence ====
Mbalula's tenure in the sports ministry coincided with the height of alleged state capture of the Zuma administration. In 2019, two years after Mbalula's departure from the ministry and nine years after his appointment, it transpired that he had first heard that he would be appointed to the ministry during a phone call with one of the Gupta brothers, close associates of Zuma's who were allegedly central figures in state capture. Senior politician Trevor Manuel was the first to attract public attention to the phone call. In a 2017 open letter to Mbalula in the Daily Maverick, Manuel recounted an ANC NEC meeting in August 2011:

There, the Fikile Mbalula we once knew wept as he spoke. He explained he'd been called to Saxonwold [the Guptas' residence] by the Guptas in May 2009 and was told that he was being promoted from the position of Deputy Minister of Police to Minister of Sport. A few days later the President confirmed this change. The weeping was about the fact that he, Fikile, was happy that he’d made it into Cabinet but that it was wrong to have learnt this from Atul Gupta.

Manuel recounted this story in his testimony to the Zondo Commission in 2019, saying that he had construed the phone call as further evidence that the Guptas may have had influence in appointing Zuma's cabinet ministers. Mbalula confirmed that Manuel's story was broadly correct, although he had in fact been promoted in 2010 and although he said that it was Ajay Gupta, not Atul Gupta, who had called to congratulate him. Ajay Gupta submitted an affidavit confirming that the phone call had taken place, though he said that he had gathered that Mbalula would be promoted from what he had read in newspapers, not based on any personal involvement in the decision.

In his own testimony to the commission, Mbalula said that he had raised the phone call with the NEC as a matter of "political conscience", motivated to confront the Guptas' political influence, but that he had been dissatisfied with the response of other NEC members. He also said that he did not have any close personal association with Gupta family, though he had met Ajay Gupta three times while in the sports ministry, on one occasion at the Guptas' home in Saxonwold.

In the final report of the Zondo Commission, chairperson Raymond Zondo pointed out that Mbalula had not disclosed the phone call in 2016 when he was interviewed about the Guptas by the Public Protector, Thuli Madonsela, during Madonsela's investigation into state capture. In fact, in his conversation with Madonsela, Mbalula had outright denied that the Guptas had contacted him about his appointment. Zondo wrote of the discrepancy:

If he lied to the Public Protector in this regard – as seems to be the case – the likely explanation is that he was protecting his own political position in the ANC and the government by shielding the then still powerful president Zuma from the Public Protector's investigation into his relationship with the Guptas. This, of course, would be no excuse. His answer to the public protector was no momentary lapse. When reading the interview transcript, one is struck by his politician's facility in walking like a trapeze artist along a line of artful prevarication – avoiding full disclosure as far as possible rather than falling into an outright lie. However, Advocate Madonsela’s persistent questioning led eventually to the latter result.

==== Public Protector finding ====
In December 2018, Madonsela's successor as Public Protector, Busisiwe Mkhwebane, reported that Mbalula had violated the Constitution and the Executive Ethics Act in his funding arrangements for an expensive family holiday, taken in Dubai while he was Sport Minister in 2016. Because Mbalula had left the cabinet by the time the finding was made, Mkhwebane did not recommend any remedial action against him. Mbalula said that Mkhwebane's conclusions were "unsubstantiated and prejudicial".

=== Minister of Police: 2017–2018 ===
On 31 March 2017, as part of a controversial cabinet reshuffle, Zuma appointed Mbalula to replace Nathi Nhleko as Minister of Police. During his first week in the ministry, Mbalula echoed his earlier remarks as Deputy Minister of Police, promising to be tough on crime and telling police officers to "meet fire with fire". Although the Daily Maverick said that Mbalula continued to have a "gung-ho attitude" in his public appearances, it also complimented his efforts to restore the morale and reputation of the police. In addition, during his year in office, Mbalula entered into a prolonged battle to remove General Berning Ntlemeza from his position at the head of the Hawks, and he also fired Khomotso Phahlane as acting National Police Commissioner.

==== Nasrec conference ====
At the ANC's 54th National Conference, held at Nasrec in December 2017, Mbalula was returned to the ANC NEC for another five-year term; by number of votes received, he was ranked 14th of the 80 ordinary members elected to the committee. However, he backed the losing presidential candidate in the race to succeed Zuma: he publicly voiced support for Zuma's preferred successor, Nkosazana Dlamini-Zuma. Indeed, he had been touted as a possible candidate to run on Dlamini-Zuma's slate for the Secretary-General position. Dlamini-Zuma lost to Zuma's deputy, Cyril Ramaphosa.

=== Hiatus in Luthuli House: 2018–2019 ===
In the aftermath of the Nasrec conference, Zuma was removed from the national presidency and replaced by Ramaphosa. When Ramaphosa announced his new cabinet on 26 February 2018, Mbalula was omitted; former Police Commissioner Bheki Cele replaced him as Minister of Police. Mbalula resigned from his parliamentary seat the same day, although his resignation was not announced until early March. The ANC said that he would return to ANC headquarters at Luthuli House to work full-time in his former role as the ANC's head of elections.

As custodian of the ANC's campaign in the 2019 general election, Mbalula said that his focus would be on reversing the "Jacob Zuma phenomenon" that had "vandalised the image of the ANC". He said that the party's "monumental blunder" during Zuma's presidency was its failure to be "more decisive in dealing with the image that has been undermined by the family of the Guptas... the fact that there was no voice that said: 'We are sorry and we are going to take action.'"

=== Minister of Transport: 2019–2023 ===
In the general election, held in May 2019, Mbalula was returned to a seat in the National Assembly, ranked sixth on the ANC's national party list. In the aftermath, President Ramaphosa appointed him to succeed Blade Nzimande as Minister of Transport in the new cabinet. He also retained his role as the ANC's head of elections and led the party through the 2021 local elections.

In the Ministry of Transport, Mbalula's mandate focused on repairing road and rail infrastructure, particularly to transfer 10% of road freight to rail by the end of the legislative term. In 2022, the Makhanda High Court, granting an application by Intercape in the wake of attacks against long-distance buses, ordered Mbalula to "ensure that reasonable and effective measures are put in place to provide for the safety and security of long-distance bus drivers and passengers in the Eastern Cape".

==== Nasrec II conference ====
In the run-up to the ANC's 55th National Conference in 2022, Mbalula publicly supported Ramaphosa's successfully bid for re-election as ANC President. He was also touted as the likely preference of Ramaphosa's faction for nomination for election as ANC Secretary-General, if a suitable woman candidate could not be found. Although Mbalula did not perform well at the nominations stage, he was announced as the victor during the conference on 19 December 2022: he received 1,692 votes (38.79% of the vote) against the 1,590 cast for Phumulo Masualle (36.45%) and 1,080 for Mdumiseni Ntuli (24.76%). As Secretary-General, he succeeded Ace Magashule, who had been suspended from the office in May 2021.

The Secretary-General works full-time from Luthuli House, and Mbalula said that he would resign from government to take up his new position. In a cabinet reshuffle on 6 March 2023, Deputy Minister of Transport Sindisiwe Chikunga was appointed to succeed him as Minister of Transport. He resigned from Parliament on the same day.

== ANC Secretary-General ==
Mbalula was elected Secretary-General of the African National Congress (ANC) at the party's 55th National Conference in December 2022. He formally took up the full-time position after the conference, stepping down from his ministerial role in early 2023.

At an early stage in his tenure as ANC Secretary-General, Mbalula was accused of interfering in the electoral processes of the ANCYL in a bid to strengthen Collen Malatji's chances of being elected ANCYL President. In particular, some ANCYL members said that he had intervened unilaterally to remove Xola Nqola from his role in convening the elections. Mbalula denied having interfered, though the matter was reportedly raised by Mondli Gungubele and Enoch Godongwana at an NEC meeting. By this time, Mbalula was expected to play an important role in the ANC's campaign in the hotly contested 2024 general election, and he was also identified as a possible contender to succeed Ramaphosa in the presidency.

In December 2023, Mbalula, in his capacity as Secretary-General of the ANC, met at Luthuli House in Johannesburg with representatives of Fatah and Hamas, including Dr Basem Naim, a member of the group's political bureau based in the Gaza Strip. The meeting took place during the "16 Days of Action Against Violence Against Women," a United Nations-initiated campaign. According to media reports, Mbalula opted not to address the victims of the Hamas-led 7 October 2023 attacks, including alleged instances of sexual and gender-based violence against Israeli women. Instead, Mbalula reaffirmed the ANC's continued support for the Palestinian cause, in alignment with the stance taken by the Palestinian representatives present.

== Personal life ==
Observers have commented on Mbalula's panache for "comic sideshows that kept him in the public eye" in his "colourful personal life". He is particularly well-known for his use of social media, and he was the most-followed South African cabinet minister on Twitter in 2022. He has branded himself variously as "Razzmatazz", "Mr Fearfokol", and "Mr Fix".

He is married to Nozuko Mbalula, with whom he has children. In January 2017, the Sunday Times reported that his wife had been sued by the Free State government; she and Hlaudi Motsoeneng were reportedly trustees of two companies which benefitted from R38-million in tender fraud in the province. She strongly denied the reports, saying that she had been a trustee of one of the companies but that it had never received any money from government.

Mbalula's older brother, Jabu, is a Member of the Executive Council in the Free State provincial government.

=== Initiation: 2008 ===
In September 2008, the Sunday Times reported that Mbalula had entered an initiation school in Philippi, Cape Town to begin a belated ritual initiation into manhood in the Xhosa tradition; Mbalula is Mpondomise. Acting as a spokesman for Mbalula, Zizi Kodwa said that Mbalula had wanted to be initiated earlier but had been delayed by his busy schedule. However, he had been taken to the school by Tony Yengeni, Nyami Booi, and Mcebisi Skwatsha, all ANC politicians, and there were reports that he may have been taken against his will. Indeed, the traditional surgeon who circumcised Mbalula told the press that Mbalula was "not informed about the circumcision" but "now he has accepted what has happened". In the surgeon's account, Mbalula's ANC comrades abducted and overpowered him while he was driving to the Cape Town International Airport. After a month in the initiation school, Mbalula returned to Bloemfontein in Tokyo Sexwale's jet for a celebration, without commenting on the circumstances of his initiation.

== Controversy ==
In October 2011, City Press reported that Mbalula had had an affair with a 27-year-old model whom he had met at a golf day in Johannesburg. According to the report, they had unprotected sex at least twice in August, and the model claimed that he had impregnated her. The newspaper also excerpted SMS messages appearing to show him encouraging the model to have an abortion. Mbalula's lawyer initially said that he would pursue extortion charges against the woman, on the grounds that the woman had allegedly demanded R40,000 from him.

However, Mbalula ultimately released a statement saying that he would not press charges, that he "should have known better", and that he apologised "to the South African society, to the African National Congress and the South African government". He denied having had unprotected sex with the woman, claiming that the condom had burst. In the week that followed, he told the New Age that national intelligence operatives had paid the woman R150,000 to "rubbish his name", which he said was evidence that state security agencies were being used to fight the ANC's internal political battles.
