= Isaac Mogase =

South African politician (1934–2021)

Mayor of Johannesburg
- In office 1995–2000
- Preceded by: Dan Pretorius
- Succeeded by: Amos Masondo

Chief Whip of the Majority Party
- In office 2007–2008
- President: Thabo Mbeki
- Preceded by: Mbulelo Goniwe
- Succeeded by: Nathi Mthethwa

Personal details
- Born: 25 January 1934
- Died: 27 April 2021 (aged 87)
- Party: African National Congress
- Occupation: Politician; anti-apartheid activist

Isaac Dank Mogase (25 January 1934 – 27 April 2021) was the first post-apartheid mayor of Johannesburg.

An anti-apartheid activist, he joined the ANC Youth League in the 1950s and was one of the leaders of the Soweto Crisis Committee in the 1980s. He was jailed numerous times for his political activities.

Mogase later served as a member of the National Assembly of South Africa from 2004 till 2012.

== See also ==
- Timeline of Johannesburg, 2000s
