= National Working Committee of the African National Congress =

Political body

The National Working Committee of the African National Congress, also known by its acronym the NWC, is a political body that comprises the top leaders of the African National Congress, South Africa's governing party. It is composed of 27 members, the "Top Seven" officials and 20 additional members who are elected by the party's National Executive Committee as soon as the National Conference concludes.

The NWC is responsible for the day-to-day running of the party and makes recommendations to the NEC.

== Composition ==
The NWC consists of the "Top Seven" (president, deputy president, national chairperson, secretary-general, two deputy secretaries-general, and treasurer-general) and 20 additional members, who are elected from among the 80 members of the NEC.

The African National Congress Veterans' League, African National Congress Women's League and the African National Congress Youth League each appoint one representative to serve on the NWC. The party requires at least 50% of the NWC members to be women. Some members are appointed full-time and have specific party responsibilities, while others hold other political offices.

The NWC may invite any party member in good standing to attend its meetings and be given assignments, but the party member may not speak on behalf of the NWC and is not entitled to vote on resolutions.

== Members ==
Following the conclusion of the party's 55th National Conference in December 2022, the NEC met over the weekend of 28–29 January 2023 to elect the new additional members of the NWC. The additional members are:

Rank	Name	Gender	Total votes
1	Mmamoloko Kubayi	F	57
2	Barbara Creecy	F	54
3	Enoch Godongwana	M	54
4	Tina Joemat-Pettersson	F	53
5	Zizi Kodwa	M	53
6	Ronald Lamola	M	53
7	David Mahlobo	M	53
8	Pemmy Majodina	F	53
9	Thandi Modise	F	50
10	Sibongile Besani	F	49
11	Stella Ndabeni-Abrahams	F	48
12	Mdumiseni Ntuli	M	46
13	Angie Motshekga	F	46
14	Senzo Mchunu	M	45
15	Mondli Gungubele	M	42
16	Mduduzi Manana	M	42
17	Peggy Nkonyeni	F	40
18	Thembi Nkadimeng	F	35
19	Nonceba Mhlauli	F	33
20	Khumbudzo Ntshavheni	F	33

== Previous composition ==
Following the NEC's first meeting after the 54th National Conference, the NWC for the 2017–2022 term was elected in January 2018. It was formally dissolved at the party's 55th National Conference. In addition to the Top Six, the members were:

- Barbara Creecy
- Thoko Didiza
- Bathabile Dlamini
- Nkosazana Dlamini-Zuma
- Derek Hanekom
- Tina Joemat-Pettersson
- Zizi Kodwa
- Ronald Lamola
- Dakota Legoete
- Pemmy Majodina (from 2018)
- Meokgo Matuba (Women's League)
- Senzo Mchunu
- Nomaindia Mfeketo (resigned 2021)
- Nonceba Mhlauli (Youth League)
- Thandi Modise
- Nomvula Mokonyane
- Edna Molewa (d. 2018)
- Angie Motshekga
- Nathi Mthethwa
- Naledi Pandor
- Jeff Radebe
- Gwen Ramkogopa (from 2021)
- Lindiwe Sisulu
- Tony Yengeni
- Snuki Zikalala (Veterans' League)

== See also ==
- National Executive Committee of the African National Congress
