= Jabu Mbalula =

South African politician and diplomat

Jabu Mbalula MPL
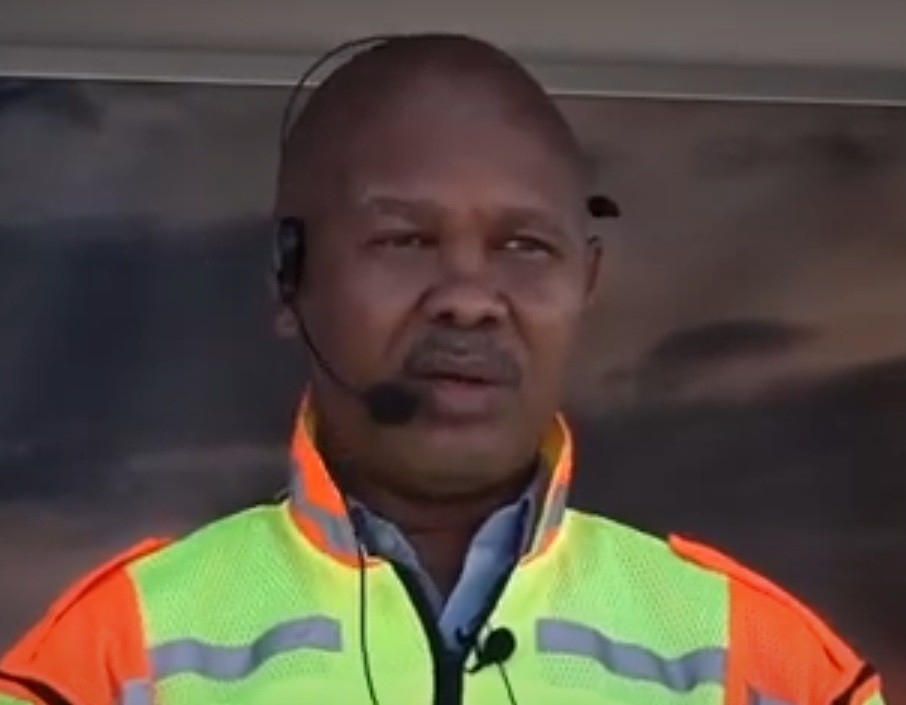
- Mbalula in December 2024

Member of the Free State Executive Council for Community Safety, Roads and Transport
- Incumbent
- Assumed office 23 June 2024
- Premier: Maqueen Letsoha-Mathae
- Preceded by: Maqueen Letsoha-Mathae

Member of the Free State Provincial Legislature
- Incumbent
- Assumed office 14 June 2024

South African Ambassador to Romania
- In office 2017–2021
- President: Jacob Zuma; Cyril Ramaphosa
- Preceded by: Thenjiwe Mtintso
- Succeeded by: Position abolished

Personal details
- Born: Jabu Ntsokolo Ishmael Mbalula; 15 December 1967 (age 58)
- Party: African National Congress
- Relatives: Fikile Mbalula (brother)
- Education: University of the Free State; Da Vinci Institute
- Profession: Politician, diplomat

Jabu Ntsokolo Ishmael Mbalula (born 15 December 1967) is a South African politician and former diplomat. A member of the African National Congress, he was elected to the Free State Provincial Legislature in the 2024 general election. He was appointed Member of the Executive Council for Community Safety, Roads and Transport shortly afterwards. Mbalula is the older brother of the incumbent Secretary-General of the African National Congress, Fikile Mbalula.

== Early life and education ==
Mbalula was born on 15 December 1967. He enrolled at the University of the Free State in 1994, however, he took a break from his studies in 1997. He later returned to the university and graduated with a Bachelor of Arts in Governance and Political Transformation in 2014. The following year, he received a postgraduate qualification in Labour Law. He proceeded to study for a Master of Public Administration in 2016, but had to discontinue his studies due to his appointment as South Africa's ambassador to Romania in 2017. In 2024, Mbalula graduated from the Da Vinci Institute with a master's degree in Technology and Innovation.

== Career ==
Mbalula was appointed chairperson of the National Youth Commission in 2000. He was reappointed to the role in 2003. He served in the position until 2006, when Nobulumko Nkondlo was appointed to succeed him.

By 2010, Mbalula was serving as the spokesperson of the provincial health department in the Free State.

In 2017, Mbalula was named South Africa's ambassador to Romania. He presented his credentials to Romanian President Klaus Iohannis on 21 November 2017. He served in the position until the South African embassy in Bucharest was closed in September 2021.

A 2022 investigative report into the illegal appointment of staffers at the Mangaung Metropolitan Municipality following the 2021 local government elections identified Mbalula as an alleged ghost employee of the municipality, costing the municipality millions of rands in monthly salaries while never reporting for work.

In February 2023, Mbalula was appointed as the provincial spokesperson of the African National Congress.

== Free State provincial government ==
Mbalula was ranked tenth on the ANC's candidate list for the 2024 Free State provincial election. He was elected to the Free State Provincial Legislature as the ANC won 16 seats. The newly elected premier Maqueen Letsoha-Mathae announced her executive council on 20 June 2024, which saw Mbalula appointed as the Member of the Executive Council responsible for Community Safety, Roads and Transport. Following his appointment to the provincial government, the ghost employee allegations resurfaced, which Mbalula denounced and further said that an investigation conducted by the municipality revealed the actual ghost employees and he was not among the implicated.

On 14 November 2025, Mbalula was sworn in as the acting premier of the Free State after Letsoha-Mathae announced that she would be taking a month-long sick leave. On 15 December 2024, City Press reported that Mbalula was allegedly insolvent and under debt administration, which made him ineligible to be a member of the provincial legislature and acting premier. The premier's office responded to these allegations by saying that Mbalula was vetted and cleared to be a member of the provincial legislature and that the publication of Mbalula's financial matters was a contravention of the Protection of Personal Information Act of 2013.

== Personal life ==
Mbalula is the older brother of Fikile Mbalula, a former cabinet minister and the current Secretary-General of the African National Congress.
