= Atholl Gardens =

- Location within Gauteng Location within South Africa
- Coordinates: 26°6′26″S 28°4′22″E
- Country: South Africa
- Province: Gauteng
- Municipality: City of Johannesburg

Area
  - Total: 0.31 km^{2} (0.12 sq mi)

Population (2001)
  - Total: 615
  - Density: 2,000/km^{2} (5,100/sq mi)
- Time zone: UTC+2 (SAST)
- Postal code (street): 2196

Atholl Gardens is a suburb of Johannesburg, South Africa. It is located in Region E.

== Demographics ==
According to the South African National Census of 2001, 615 people lived in Atholl Gardens. 73.7% were White, 22.0% Black African, 3.9% Indian or Asian and 0.5% Coloured. 71.7% spoke English, 7.5% Afrikaans, 5.9% Zulu, 4.4% Tswana, 2.9% Sotho, 2.0% Venda, 2.0% Xhosa, 0.5% Northern Sotho, 0.5% Swazi, 0.5% Southern Ndebele and 2.4% some other language as their first language.
