= Mnyamezeli Booi =

South African politician (born 1958)

Member of the National Assembly
- In office May 1994 – 7 May 2019

Personal details
- Born: 15 October 1958 (age 67)
- Citizenship: South Africa
- Party: African National Congress

Mnyamezeli Shedrack "Nyami" Booi (born 15 October 1958) is a South African politician who represented the African National Congress (ANC) in the National Assembly from 1994 to 2019. During that time he served as Chief Whip of the Majority Party from October 2008 to April 2009 and as Chairperson of the Portfolio Committee on Defence and Military Veterans from June 2009 to October 2010.

A former anti-apartheid activist, Booi served on the ANC National Executive Committee between 2007 and 2012. He was convicted of fraud in 2009 in relation to the Travelgate scandal, and in 2019 he was reprimanded in Parliament for violating parliamentary rules about the disclosure of external financial interests.

== Early life and activism ==
Booi was born on 15 October 1958. During his youth he was involved in anti-apartheid activism, first through the Black Consciousness-aligned South African Students' Movement and later through the ANC underground; he was detained for his political activities. His brother is Fumanekile "Fatty" Booi, who was also active in the ANC during apartheid and who later became a prominent figure in the Umkhonto we Sizwe Military Veterans' Association.

== Legislative career ==
Booi was first elected to an ANC seat in the National Assembly in the general election of 1994, South Africa's first under universal suffrage. During his third term in Parliament, in December 2007, the ANC's 52nd National Conference elected Booi to a five-year term on the party's National Executive Committee; by number of votes received, he was ranked 41st of the 80 ordinary members elected.

=== Majority Chief Whip: 2008–2009 ===
On 23 October 2008, the ANC announced that Booi had been appointed Chief Whip of the Majority Party in the National Assembly; he succeeded Nathi Mthethwa, who had been promoted to the cabinet, and was deputised by Gratitude Magwanishe. He held the office only until the next general election in April 2009, after which he was replaced by Mathole Motshekga.

=== Travelgate conviction: 2009 ===
The opposition Democratic Alliance objected to Booi's appointment as Chief Whip because he was at that time facing criminal charges in connection with the Travelgate scandal. Booi was one of about 30 Members of Parliament who was accused of collaborating with private travel agencies to defraud Parliament and use parliamentary travel vouchers to claim unlawful benefits. He was charged with fraud in relation to several transactions involving a total of R140,000, emanating from his second term in Parliament between 1999 and 2004.

Booi made his first court appearance in the Cape Town Regional Court in February 2005. He insisted that he was innocent of any wrongdoing and he was the only Member of Parliament in the case who refused to enter into a plea bargain with the Scorpions. However, in September 2009, he also accepted a plea bargain, in terms of which he pled guilty to theft and was fined R50,000 or five years' imprisonment, in addition to a mandatory one-year prison sentence conditionally suspended for five years. He admitted that he had wrongly used parliamentary travel vouchers – designated only for air-travel expenses – for R92,000 in car rentals and R20,000 in hotel accommodation.

=== Defence Committee Chair: 2009–2010 ===
In the 2009 general election, Booi was re-elected to his legislative seat, ranked 69th on the ANC's national party list, and the ANC announced that it would nominate him to chair Parliament's Portfolio Committee on Defence and Military Veterans. He held the chair from June 2009 until October 2010, during which time he entered into a public row with Lindiwe Sisulu, then the Minister of Defence and Military Veterans under President Jacob Zuma; the Committee insisted that a particular report by the interim National Defence Force commission should be submitted to Parliament, but Sisulu refused.

The ANC supported Sisulu and, on 18 November 2010, announced that it would instruct its caucus to vote to remove Booi as committee chairperson. ANC Deputy Secretary-General Thandi Modise told the media that the party "was not impressed with the to-ing and fro-ing between the committee and the minister. We were not happy with the way the committee was functioning and with the way it lost focus and the main thrust of its mandate."

=== Ethics inquiry: 2017–2019 ===
After his Travelgate conviction and removal as committee chairperson, Booi was re-elected to Parliament in the 2014 general election; he was initially listed 119th on the ANC's national party list but he was moved up the list after the election when Dina Pule withdrew her name. During the legislative term that followed, Booi served as the ANC's whip in the Standing Committee on Public Accounts.

He was also subject to a prolonged investigation by Parliament's ethics committee, which began in mid-2017 when the Democratic Alliance's James Lorimer reported him to Parliament for failing to disclose remuneration received for extra-parliamentary work: Booi had been appointed as a consultant to Lurco Coal, a private company, in late 2015. Booi did not dispute that he had done the consulting work, but he argued that parliamentary rules did not require him to disclose the contract in 2016 and denied that there was any possible conflict of interest. However, when the investigation began, Booi expressed regret for the non-disclosure, saying it had been an oversight. In March 2019, weeks before the end of the legislative term, the Joint Committee on Ethics and Members' Interests found Booi guilty of misconduct in terms of the parliamentary rules; it recommended that he should be reprimanded in the National Assembly and fined 45 days' salary.

Booi did not stand for re-election to Parliament in the 2019 general election.
