= Stone Sizani =

South African politician (born 1954)

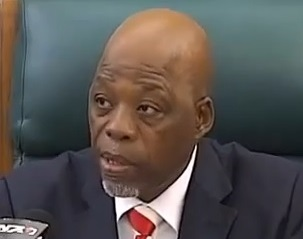
- Sizani in 2014

Chief Whip of the Majority Party
- In office 2013 – 2 March 2016
- President: Jacob Zuma
- Preceded by: Mathole Motshekga
- Succeeded by: Jackson Mthembu

Member of the National Assembly of South Africa
- In office 22 April 2009 – 2 March 2016

Personal details
- Born: 2 March 1954 (age 72)
- Party: African National Congress
- Education: University of East Anglia

Phumelele Stone Sizani (born 2 March 1954) is a South African politician who was, until his resignation on 2 March 2016, a Member of the National Assembly of South Africa and the African National Congress Chief Whip. Upon leaving Parliament he became South African Ambassador to Germany.

== Early life ==
At the age of 18 he was arrested and sent to Robben Island as a political prisoner, where he remained incarcerated from 1978 to 1980. He graduated with an MA in development studies from the University of East Anglia in 1995, where he was a Chevening Scholar.
