= 53rd National Conference of the African National Congress =

Elective meeting of the African National Congress for the year 2012

← 2007	16–20 December 2012	2017 →

4,500 party delegates 50% + 1 votes needed to win
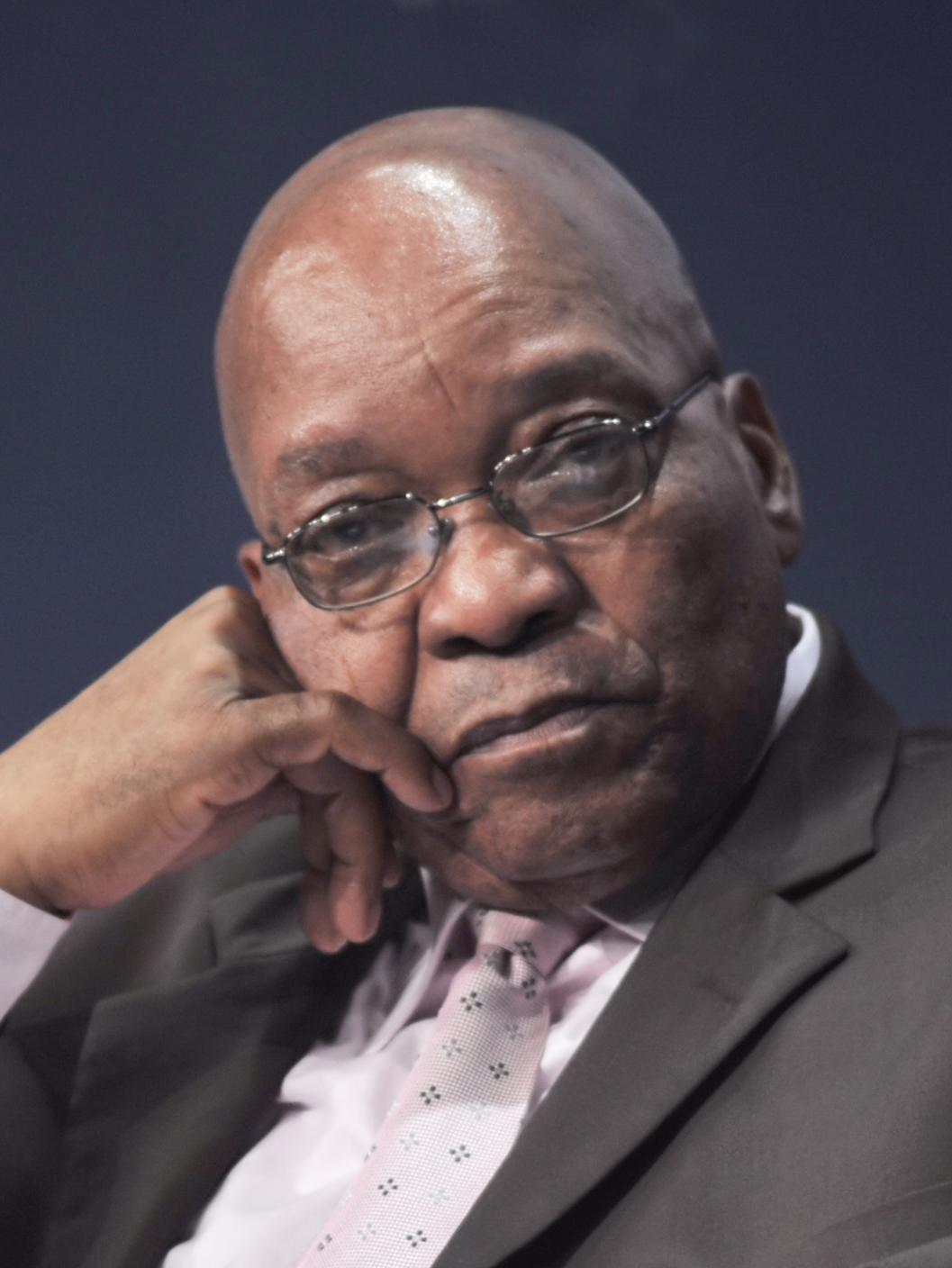

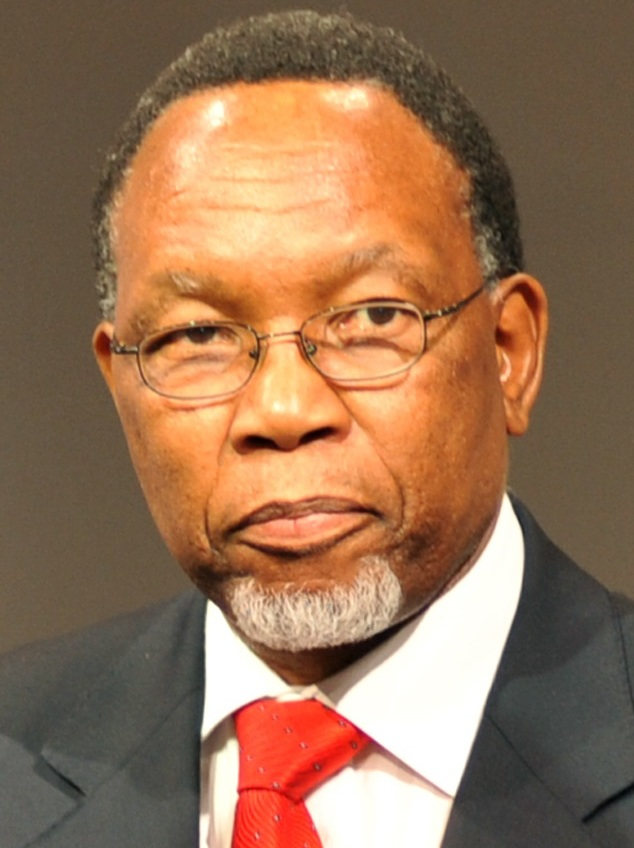
Candidate	Jacob Zuma	Kgalema Motlanthe
Delegate vote	2,978	991
Percentage	75.03%	24.97%
President before election
Jacob Zuma
Elected President
Jacob Zuma

The 53rd National Conference of the African National Congress (ANC) was held in Mangaung, Free State from 16 to 20 December 2012, during the centenary of the ANC's establishment, also in Mangaung. It re-elected incumbent President Jacob Zuma and his supporters to the party's top leadership and National Executive Committee (NEC), solidly defeating an opposing group that had coalesced around presidential challenger Deputy President Kgalema Motlanthe.

The conference was a precursor to the general election of 2014, in which, due to the ANC's internal norms and substantial electoral majority, the ANC President was extremely likely to become President of South Africa. Zuma was indeed re-elected to the presidency in 2014 when the ANC won 62.15% of the national vote. The conference also represented only the second electoral contest for the ANC presidency since 1952 – at the 52nd National Conference of the African National Congress in 2007, Zuma had himself broken from the ANC's tradition of appointing presidents unanimously when he deposed incumbent Thabo Mbeki.

The conference is also notable for inaugurating the political renaissance of Cyril Ramaphosa, a former ANC Secretary General and longstanding NEC member who had resigned from politics in 1997 to pursue a career in business. He was elected ANC Deputy President at Mangaung and eventually became Zuma's successor.

== Background ==
=== "Anyone but Zuma" ===
The 53rd National Conference ultimately became a contest between a faction aligned to Deputy President Kgalema Motlanthe and another faction aligned to President Jacob Zuma, whose presidency had recently been mired in controversy, especially due to the developing Nkandla scandal and recent Marikana massacre. However, it was not clear until 13 December – days before the conference – that Motlanthe intended to stand for the presidency, and he appeared a reluctant candidate. Indeed, the coalition backing him was often referred to as the "Anyone But Zuma" (ABZ) camp. Minister of Human Settlements Tokyo Sexwale had previously indicated his intention to run for the presidency, but instead was nominated for the deputy presidency on the Motlanthe-aligned slate. In October 2012, the ANC's Tripartite Alliance partner, the Congress of South African Trade Unions, endorsed Zuma's presidency, but also endorsed Motlanthe for the deputy presidency. Blade Nzimande, the General Secretary of the South African Communist Party (SACP), expressed the SACP's satisfaction with Zuma's leadership at the SACP's national congress in July 2012. The ANC Youth League, however, enthusiastically welcomed Motlanthe's candidacy.

=== Branch nominations ===
The ANC conference was preceded by substantial disarray at the level of the provincial party branches, which, according to the ANC constitution, are responsible for nominating candidates for the leadership elections. The provincial conferences in the Western Cape and the Limpopo had to be run twice, after they collapsed on the first attempt, and the North West conference was also tumultuous. The resolutions of the Free State provincial conference, under provincial ANC Chairperson and Premier Ace Magashule, were successfully challenged in the Constitutional Court. Ultimately, voting at the conference preceded with different-coloured ballot papers for the North West and Free State delegates, for convenience in the case of the anticipated legal challenges.

== Leadership election ==
On 17 December, working from the nominations proposed by the provincial branches, the conference finalised the list of nominees for the "Top Six" positions (President, Deputy President, Secretary General, Deputy Secretary General, National Chairperson and Treasurer General). Motlanthe declined a nomination to stand for re-election as Deputy President, whereas Cyril Ramaphosa did not confirm that he intended to accept his nomination for the deputy presidency until 16 December, the day before the conference. Fikile Mbalula and incumbent Thandi Modise withdrew their candidacy in the Deputy Secretary General election, to pursue the Secretary General and Chairperson posts respectively; and Magashule withdrew from contention for the chairmanship. Even with this substantial number of nominations declined, every position remained contested except for the Deputy Secretary General position, which Jessie Duarte secured unopposed.

The conference was attended by 4,500 voting delegates, primarily allocated from the provincial branches, but not all of them cast ballots. Voting for the Top Six began after the second day of the conference, around 2 a.m. on 18 December. All of the incumbents of the Top Six were running for re-election or election to new positions, but half of them – Motlanthe, Modise, and Mathews Phosa – were ultimately defeated and removed from the Top Six. The consistently large margin of support for Zuma's slate of candidates was taken to indicate that the party's factions had voted in blocs on the top positions. Zuma was presumably bolstered by the high number of delegates from KwaZulu-Natal, his home province and central support base. The results of the leadership elections, announced on the afternoon of 18 December, were as follows (victorious candidates in bold):

Position	Candidate	Votes	%
President	**Jacob Zuma**	**2,978**	**75.03%**
President	Kgalema Motlanthe	991	24.97%
Deputy President	**Cyril Ramaphosa**	**3,018**	**76.25%**
Deputy President	Tokyo Sexwale	470	11.87%
Deputy President	Mathews Phosa	470	11.87%
National Chairperson	**Baleka Mbete**	**3,010**	**76.22%**
National Chairperson	Thandi Modise	939	23.78%
Secretary General	**Gwede Mantashe**	**3,058**	**77.11%**
Secretary General	Fikile Mbalula	908	22.89%
Deputy Secretary General	**Jessie Duarte**	Unopposed	
Treasurer General	**Zweli Mkhize**	**2,988**	**75.66%**
Treasurer General	Paul Mashatile	961	24.34%

There are some minor discrepancies in reports of the election counts – for example, City Press reported that Zuma had won 2,982 votes, that Sexwale had won 463, and that Modise had won 393. Likewise, IOL reported that Zuma had won 2,983 votes, Sexwale 463, and Mbalula 901. The confusion is presumably because the counts were read aloud at the conference amid noisy celebration from delegates.

== Election of the National Executive Committee ==
The other 80 members of the NEC were elected from 230 nominees, following delays due to errors on the ballot paper, and the results were announced at the end of the conference. The following ten candidates received the most votes:

1. Nkosazana Dlamini-Zuma (2,921 votes)
2. Malusi Gigaba (2,669 votes)
3. Lindiwe Sisulu (2,658 votes)
4. Collins Chabane (2,585 votes)
5. Jeff Radebe (2,570 votes)
6. Naledi Pandor (2,517 votes)
7. Derek Hanekom (2,497 votes)
8. Pravin Gordhan (2,465 votes)
9. Tito Mboweni (2,463 votes)
10. Nathi Mthethwa (2,450 votes)

All of the candidates who stood against Zuma's nominees for the Top Six positions were dropped from the NEC (except Mashatile, who had not been a member). Motlanthe and Modise withdrew their names from the ballots, and Sexwale, Phosa, Mbalula, and Mashatile failed to secure enough votes. Mbalula, however, was later co-opted onto the NEC to fill a vacancy.

At the conference, a motion to reduce the size of the NEC to 66 elected members (its size prior to the last conference) was defeated, though the conference did resolve that candidates for election onto the NEC should have been members of the ANC for at least ten years, should be proven leaders, and should have undergone training at the party's political school.

== Assassination plot ==
On the first day of the conference, it was reported that four white extremists had been arrested in connection with a plot to bomb the conference venue. Though police initially denied that the arrests were related to the conference, they admitted otherwise the next day. By the end of the conference, the National Prosecuting Authority had publicly alleged that the four men had been planning to attack the venue with mortar bombs and then to conduct a ground assault, with the intention of executing Zuma and other senior leaders. All four men were charged with high treason, but only one went to trial – Mark Trollip pleaded guilty to conspiracy in 2013 and was sentenced to eight years' imprisonment; the charges against Hein Boonzaaier were dropped; and Martin Keevy was declared unfit to stand trial. In November 2014, Johan Prinsloo was found guilty of high treason and possession of illegal arms, though he was cleared on charges of conspiracy to commit terrorism. He was sentenced to thirteen years' imprisonment.
