= 52nd National Conference of the African National Congress =

Elective meeting of the African National Congress for the year 2007

- 16–20 December 2007

3,983 party delegates 50% + 1 votes needed to win
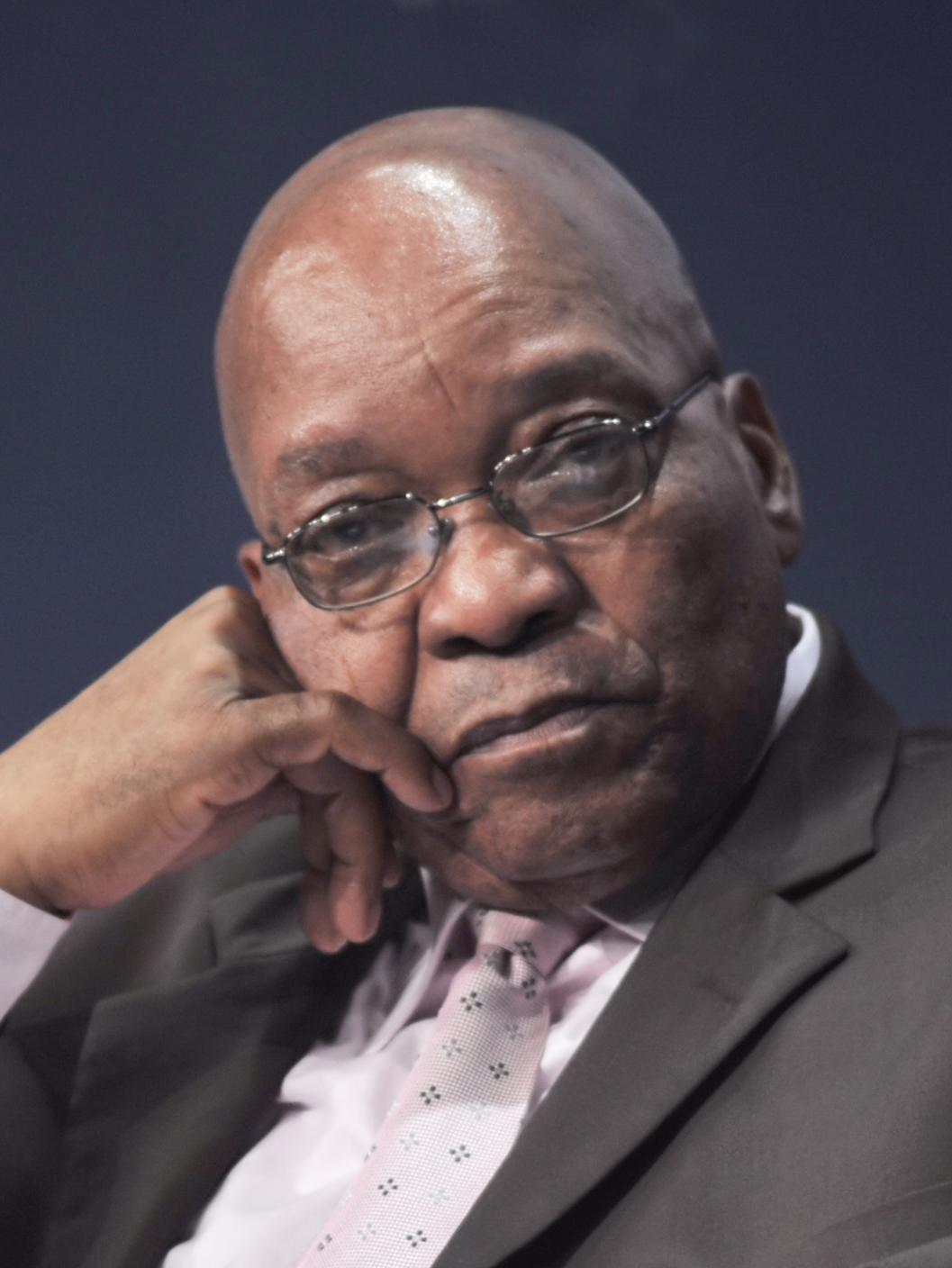

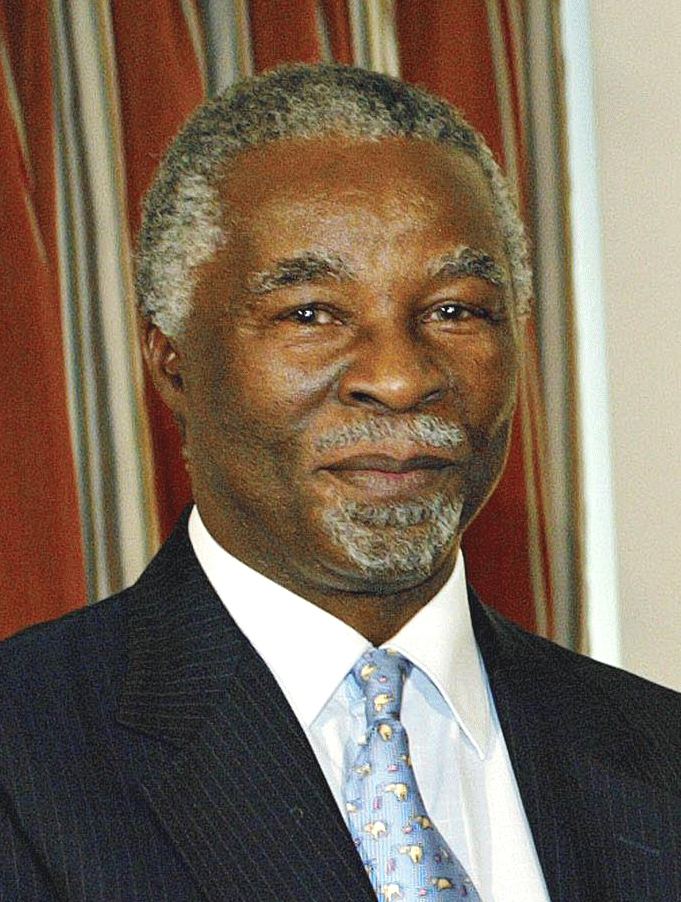
Candidate	Jacob Zuma	Thabo Mbeki
Delegate vote	2,329	1,505
Percentage	60.75%	39.25%
President before election
Thabo Mbeki
Elected President
Jacob Zuma

The 52nd National Conference of the African National Congress (ANC) was held in Polokwane, Limpopo, from 16 to 20 December 2007. At the conference, Jacob Zuma and his supporters were elected to the party's top leadership and National Executive Committee (NEC), dealing a significant defeat to national President Thabo Mbeki, who had sought a third term in the ANC presidency. The conference was a precursor to the general election of 2009, which the ANC was extremely likely to win and which did indeed lead to Zuma's ascension to the presidency of South Africa. Mbeki was prohibited from serving a third term as national President but, if re-elected ANC President, could likely have leveraged that office to select his successor.

Held on the Mankweng campus of the University of Limpopo, attended by 4,000 delegates, and often known simply as "Polokwane," the conference is frequently described as a watershed moment in post-apartheid South African politics. Zuma's challenge to Mbeki's incumbency resulted in the party's first contested presidential election since 1952, and it led to the first major split in the ANC since its unbanning in 1990. Although former ANC President Nelson Mandela addressed delegates with a plea for unity, the conference is thought to have heralded an era of factionalism within the ANC, and it was followed by the establishment of the Congress of the People by a pro-Mbeki splinter group. In September 2008, some months before the general election, the Polokwane-constituted NEC removed Mbeki from his position as national President, and Kgalema Motlanthe – who had been elected ANC Deputy President at Polokwane – was appointed interim President.

== Background ==
=== Mbeki-Zuma rivalry ===
Jacob Zuma had previously been a close ally of President Thabo Mbeki, and they had served as ANC Deputy President and President respectively since the 50th National Conference in December 1997. Their relationship publicly soured after Mbeki fired Zuma from the national deputy presidency in June 2005, once Zuma had been implicated in corruption by the criminal conviction of his close associate Schabir Shaik. However, though facing his own corruption charges (and from December a rape charge), Zuma retained the ANC deputy presidency, and, in this close proximity, the acrimony between the pair deepened and spread into other pockets of the party and state, eventually becoming what Susan Booysen has called "no-holds barred, a brutal and all-consuming disagreement between two major ANC groupings." Key points of contention between the two groups reportedly included cadre deployment, political prosecutions, and the ANC's relationship to its Tripartite Alliance partners; and Mbeki was also facing public criticism for his HIV/AIDS policy and foreign policy on Zimbabwe. Zuma became an apparent contender for the next ANC presidential elections, which would be held at the conference at the end of 2007. By April 2007, it was clear that Mbeki intended to run for a third term as ANC President – although he was prohibited by the Constitution from standing again for the national presidency, the ANC has no such term limits internally. Some suspected that Mbeki intended to continue to exert substantial influence over the government through his ANC office.

[C]ertain negative and completely unacceptable tendencies have emerged within our movement, which threaten the very survival of the ANC as the trusted servant of the people it has been for 96 years... [P]eople who are obviously hostile to our movement [have] sought to divide the leadership and weaken our movement.

— Thabo Mbeki's political report to the 52nd Conference

Zuma's campaign had strong support in his home province, KwaZulu-Natal, among ethnic Zulus – Mbeki, like his predecessor Nelson Mandela, was a Xhosa-speaker from the Eastern Cape. He also drew support from the ANC Youth League under Fikile Mbalula, and from the ANC's partners in the Tripartite Alliance, the South African Communist Party (SACP) and the Congress of South African Trade Unions (COSATU). At the time, the SACP and COSATU had extremely poor relationships with Mbeki, objecting especially to his "neoliberal" economic policies and the centralised nature of his administration. Blade Nzimande of the SACP and Zwelinzima Vavi of COSATU were among Zuma's chief organisers and most vocal supporters (though both came to recant their support years later). Other politicians who are thought to have supported Zuma's campaign include Siphiwe Nyanda, Julius Malema, and Bathabile Dlamini of the ANC Women's League. The pro-Zuma faction of this period is sometimes known as the "coalition of the wounded," a phrase Vavi used when conjecturing that Zuma would be bolstered by internal opposition to Mbeki among those Mbeki had sidelined. Zuma also gained the support of five of the nine provincial branches when they nominated candidates at their provincial congresses. However, the nominations were not binding on the votes of conference delegates, so there remained a modest chance that the conference would favour Mbeki. Mbeki gained the support of the Women's League, reportedly on the condition that he endorsed Nkosazana Dlamini-Zuma as deputy president with an eye to installing her as national President in 2009.

Most ANC leaders initially claimed that no campaigns were underway for the party presidency, and that the party was united. Media interest in the campaign was high, and, given the controversy around both Mbeki and Zuma's candidacies, there was substantial speculation about potential "compromise candidates." Businessman and former Gauteng Premier Tokyo Sexwale was understood to be campaigning for the presidency from around May 2007 – though he had not officially announced his candidacy, he said publicly that he was prepared to be President if called upon by members. Cyril Ramaphosa and Kgalema Motlanthe were also rumoured to be potential candidates. Ultimately, however, only Mbeki and Zuma were formally nominated at the conference.

=== Other leadership contests ===
As became the norm at later conferences, Mbeki and Zuma each ran alongside an informal slate of candidates for the other so-called "Top Six" positions: Deputy President, Secretary General, Deputy Secretary General, National Chairperson, and Treasurer General. Sexwale was nominated for the chairmanship and ran on Zuma's slate, but, during the conference, at an evening plenary on 17 December to finalise the nominations, he withdrew his name and endorsed Baleka Mbete, the Speaker of the National Assembly, citing his commitment to "the empowerment of women." Mbete was then nominated for the position from the floor. When she subsequently withdrew her name from consideration for the deputy secretary general position, Thandi Modise was nominated from the floor in her stead. Both Mbete and Modise ran on the Zuma slate. The Mbeki slate also shifted – in early November 2007, Dlamini-Zuma and Joel Netshitenzhe were added, replacing Motlanthe and Sankie Mthembi-Mahanyele, who instead were moved to the top of the Mbeki camp's list of recommended NEC candidates (while Motlanthe also featured on the Zuma slate for the Top Six).

== Leadership election ==
3,983 ballots were issued for the leadership elections, and 3,974 were returned. The results of the vote, announced on the evening of 18 December, were as follows (victorious candidates in bold):

Position	Candidate	Votes	%
President	**Jacob Zuma**	**2,329**	**60.75%**
President	Thabo Mbeki	1,505	39.25%
Deputy President	**Kgalema Motlanthe**	**2,346**	**61.90%**
Deputy President	Nkosazana Dlamini-Zuma	1,444	38.10%
National Chairperson	**Baleka Mbete**	**2,326**	**61.19%**
National Chairperson	Joel Netshitenzhe	1,475	38.81%
Secretary General	**Gwede Mantashe**	**2,378**	**62.41%**
Secretary General	Terror Lekota	1,432	37.59%
Deputy Secretary General	**Thandi Modise**	**2,304**	**61.29%**
Deputy Secretary General	Thoko Didiza	1,455	38.71%
Treasurer General	**Mathews Phosa**	**2,328**	**62.88%**
Treasurer General	Phumzile Mlambo-Ngcuka	1,374	37.12%

The pro-Zuma candidates won every position with a consistent margin, suggesting that factions had voted as blocs on the Top Six positions. Interpretations of the electoral results differ. Many have seen Zuma as a populist success, and Polokwane as marking a shift within the ANC towards populism and away from aloof Mbeki-era intellectualism and centralisation. Others, including Mbeki biographer Mark Gevisser, have argued that although both candidates had some genuine supporters, votes at Polokwane were largely "negatively driven" – that is, most votes for Mbeki were votes against Zuma, while most votes for Zuma were a protest against Mbeki, and especially a protest in favour of institutional renewal over a third-term presidency. This interpretation is supported by the fact that one of the conference's resolutions was that "there is general agreement that the ANC President should serve no more than two terms of office."

== Election of the National Executive Committee ==
The 52nd Conference changed the ANC Constitution to increase the size of the NEC from 66 members to 86 members (including the Top Six), at least half of whom would now have to be women. The 80 additional members were elected from 158 nominees, and the results were announced at the end of the conference, around midnight on 20 December. The following ten candidates received the most votes:

1. Winnie Mandela (2,845 votes)
2. Jeff Radebe (2,716 votes)
3. Zola Skweyiya (2,700 votes)
4. Pallo Jordan (2,645 votes)
5. Jeremy Cronin (2,519 votes)
6. Jessie Duarte (2,448 votes)
7. Lindiwe Sisulu (2,384 votes)
8. Sankie Mthembi-Mahanyele (2,291 votes)
9. Brigitte Mabandla (2,235 votes)
10. Tokyo Sexwale (2,198 votes)

Though enlarged, the NEC as constituted at Polokwane had dropped several former (and longstanding) members, many of whom were considered Mbeki allies. Director-General in the Presidency Frank Chikane and ANC spokesperson Smuts Ngonyama did not receive enough votes for re-election; nor did Aziz Pahad, Dipuo Peters, Frene Ginwala, Popo Molefe, and Saki Macozoma. Notably, no fewer than eleven members of Mbeki's cabinet were among those removed from the NEC: Ministers Ivy Matsepe-Casaburri, Terror Lekota, Ronnie Kasrils, Membathisi Mdladlana, Sydney Mufamadi, Alec Erwin, Geraldine Fraser-Moleketi, Thoko Didiza, Charles Nqakula, and Essop Pahad, as well as national Deputy President Phumzile Mlambo-Ncguka, all failed to gain re-election. The changes to the composition of the NEC, and also that of the National Working Committee, were viewed as a substantial defeat for the Mbeki camp.

== Controversies ==
=== Decorum ===
The conference was marked by signs of disunity and ill discipline from the opening session, when a motion from the Youth League to count votes manually devolved into shouting at outgoing Chairperson Terror Lekota and resulted in enough disarray that the adoption of the conference programme had to be deferred to a later session. Later that day, Mbeki was jeered and heckled while presenting his political report. This was not only unprecedented at a national conference but also a break from general ANC tradition. Several commentators described it as a humiliation for Mbeki. Following complaints from the Eastern Cape branch, the NEC called an emergency meeting to discuss decorum matters.

Also early in the conference, ANC leadership confiscated partisan placards from delegates who were using them to announce their support for one or the other candidate. And, extremely unusual for the ANC, rallies for the candidates were held during the conference, with thousands of Mbeki supporters and Zuma supporters reportedly gathering outside the plenary tent in two separate gatherings several metres apart. The pro-Mbeki rally was reportedly led by Mluleki George and Saki Macozoma. Throughout the conference, including directly after Mbeki's political report, Zuma supporters sang "Umshini wami", an Umkhonto we Sizwe song that had become Zuma's trademark. Zuma himself closed the conference by leading the crowd in the song. Delegates also developed hand signals that they used during the political addresses – for example, when incumbents like Mbeki were speaking, their opponents used the hand signal which in football is used to call for a substitution of new players, in this context denoting a call for regime change. Over the course of the conference, several party leaders cautioned delegates and attempted to call them to order, but the response to rowdy delegates of the top leadership, especially Lekota, remained a point of contention – Mbeki supporters said the response was too lenient, while Zuma supporters questioned its impartiality.

=== Disqualification of delegates ===
On the first day of the conference, the Youth League moved to insist on manual vote counts to prevent vote-rigging. The Mbeki camp opposed the motion, claiming that electronic voting was required to ensure that only legitimately credentialed delegates cast votes. The conference supported the manual counting motion in respect of the Top Six elections.

On 18 December, the credentials committee announced that it had disqualified a number of provincial delegates, on the basis that they had been selected at inquorate provincial meetings. The changes affected the representation at the conference of three branches, including the two largest. Gauteng, which had supported Zuma during the nominations phase, lost 96 voting delegates for a total of 258; KwaZulu-Natal, a Zuma stronghold, lost two for a total of 628; and the Eastern Cape, an Mbeki stronghold, lost 29 for a total of 899. The Eastern Cape branch also moved that the Youth League (68 delegates) should be disqualified on the grounds that it had not held its annual congress, but the motion was defeated. 3,983 ballots were ultimately issued.

== Aftermath ==
Mbeki's term as national President was due to expire in April 2009 after the general elections, but the conference outcomes fostered speculation that he would resign or be pushed out sooner. When the corruption charges against Zuma were reinstated, Mbeki was accused of orchestrating a political conspiracy. In September 2008, High Court Judge Chris Nicholson, while dismissing the corruption charges against Zuma on a technicality, found that there was evidence of "political meddling" by Mbeki in Zuma's case. Nicholson's judgement was later overturned, but the Polokwane-elected NEC immediately called a special meeting and decided after 14 hours of debate that Mbeki should leave his office. Of course, the NEC, a party-political organ, had no legal authority to recall Mbeki directly, but the ANC controlled Parliament, which did have the authority to recall him. Mbeki decided to accede and resign in order to avoid a protracted and high-profile battle in Parliament. About a third of his cabinet also resigned, in protest of the NEC's decision. Mbeki was replaced by Motlanthe, who had been elected ANC Deputy President at Polokwane. Motlanthe led an interim or caretaker administration while Zuma campaigned for the 2009 elections.

In response to Polokwane and to Mbeki's "recall," a group of pro-Mbeki ANC members broke away and in November 2008 announced the foundation of a new political party, the Congress of the People (COPE). They were led by former Defence Minister (and two-term ANC Chairperson) Terror Lekota and former Gauteng Premier Sam Shilowa, both of whom had been influential in the anti-apartheid struggle but had failed to gain election to the NEC at Polokwane. In the 2009 general elections, COPE won 7.42% of the national vote and 30 parliamentary seats, becoming the second largest opposition party less than six months after its establishment.
