= Joyce Moloi-Moropa =

South African politician (born 1964)

National Treasurer of the South African Communist Party
- Incumbent
- Assumed office July 2012
- General Secretary: Solly Mapaila; Blade Nzimande
- Preceded by: Phumulo Masualle

Member of the National Assembly
- In office 14 November 2008 – 29 February 2016
- In office 1 August 2001 – April 2004

Personal details
- Born: 13 May 1964 (age 62) Soweto, Transvaal; South Africa
- Party: South African Communist Party
- Other political affiliations: African National Congress
- Education: University of Limpopo

Joyce Clementine Moloi-Moropa (born 13 May 1964) is a South African politician who has been the treasurer of the South African Communist Party (SACP) since 2012. She represented the African National Congress (ANC) in the National Assembly from 2008 to 2016 and before that from 2001 to 2004. She chaired Parliament's Portfolio Committee on Communications from 2014 until her resignation at the end of February 2016, and in that capacity she was frequently at odds with the communications ministry and board of the SABC.

Formerly a student activist in Limpopo, Moloi-Moropa has been a member of the SACP Central Committee since 1998 and a senior office-bearer since 2009, when she was appointed to replace Ncumisa Kondlo as SACP deputy chairperson. She also served two terms on the ANC's National Executive Committee from 2007 to 2017. She was elected to a third term as SACP national treasurer in July 2022.

== Early life and career ==
Moloi-Moropa was born on 13 May 1964 in Soweto. She has a Bachelor of Arts and honours degree, as well as a teaching diploma, from the University of Limpopo. She rose to prominence during the democratic transition of the 1990s through the Northern Transvaal branch of the South African Students Congress (SASCO); she was elected as the branch's provincial gender officer in the early 1990s and then served as provincial chairperson from 1993 to 1995.

She was also a member of the ANC, acting as secretary of the party's Polokwane branch from 1996 to 1997, and of its close ally, the SACP; in 1997, she was elected to the SACP's provincial executive committee in Limpopo (then called the Northern Province). At the SACP's tenth national congress in 1998, Moloi-Moropa was elected for the first time to the party's national Central Committee. She has served continuously on the Central Committee since then.

== National Assembly ==
=== First term: 2001–2004 ===
On 1 August 2001, Moloi-Moropa was sworn in to an ANC seat in the National Assembly, the lower house of the South African Parliament; she filled the casual vacancy that had arisen after Jannie Momberg's resignation. During the legislative term that followed, in August 2002, she was elected to the SACP's Politburo for the first time.

=== Second term: 2008–2016 ===
Although she left Parliament after the next general election in 2004, her political rise continued; at the ANC's 52nd National Conference in December 2007, she was elected to a five-year term as a member of the ANC's National Executive Committee, ranked 70th among the 80 elected candidates by number of votes received. Less than a year later, on 14 November 2008, she returned to the National Assembly to replace Alec Erwin, who was among the several senior ANC MPs who had resigned after President Thabo Mbeki was recalled from office. She remained in the seat until 2016, gaining re-election in 2009 and 2014.

During that period, Moloi-Moropa assumed senior national office in the SACP. In August 2009, the Central Committee agreed unanimously to appointed her as the SACP's national deputy chairperson; she deputised Gwede Mantashe and succeeded Ncumisa Kondlo, who had died the previous year. At the SACP's next national congress in July 2012, she was democratically elected as national treasurer. In the SACP, she was viewed as a close ally of Blade Nzimande, the party's long-serving general secretary. In December 2012, she was additionally re-elected to a second five-year term on the ANC National Executive Committee, ranked 46th of the 80 elected members.

==== Communications chair: 2014–2016 ====
In parallel to her party offices, Moloi-Moropa represented the ANC as a committee chair in Parliament. She chaired the Portfolio Committee on Public Service and Administration from 2009 until after the 2014 election, when the ANC nominated her to chair the Portfolio Committee on Communications. Her tenure in that position coincided with a great deal of controversy about the governance and management of the public broadcaster, the SABC, oversight of which fell under her portfolio. In meetings, she clashed publicly with both Ellen Tshabalala, the SABC board chairperson, and Faith Muthambi, the Minister of Communications; she was also occasionally at odds with the ANC's own caucus in the committee, particularly on the issue of Hlaudi Motsoeneng's appointment to the SABC executive.

In October 2015, City Press reported that the SACP was frustrated by the ANC's treatment of Moloi-Moropa and wished to recall her from Parliament to serve at SACP headquarters full-time; the newspaper also claimed to have seen a copy of a letter from Moloi-Moropa to the ANC in which she described her difficulties in the committee and asked to be relieved of the position. Moloi-Moropa refused to comment on the report but, in February 2016, announced her resignation from Parliament with effect from the end of the month. She left on 29 February 2016. ANC chief whip Stone Sizani said that Moloi-Moropa had asked to be released "to focus on her enormous responsibilities as SACP Treasurer on full-time basis, as she felt her split focus on both party and parliamentary roles did neither of them justice"; her departure was widely presumed to be linked to her tense relationship with Minister Muthambi.

== Later career ==
Moloi-Moropa remained in office as SACP treasurer, gaining re-election in 2017 and 2022.

== Personal life ==
She is married.
