= Central Committee of the South African Communist Party =

Executive organ of the South African Communist Party

The Central Committee of the South African Communist Party is the highest decision-making body of the South African Communist Party (SACP). It is elected for a five-year term at regular national congresses of the SACP. The 15th National Central Committee was elected in July 2022 and will expire in 2027.

== Current membership ==
=== Leadership ===
- General Secretary: Solly Afrika Mapaila
- First Deputy General Secretary: Madala Masuku
- Second Deputy General Secretary: David Masondo
- National Chairperson: Blade Nzimande
- Deputy National Chairperson: Thulas Nxesi
- National Treasurer: Joyce Moloi-Moropa

=== Members ===
- Polly Boshielo
- Gregory Brown
- Nomarashiya Caluza
- Yunus Carrim
- Rob Davies
- Molly Dhlamini
- Sdumo Dlamini
- Mluleki Dlelanga
- Kholiswa Fihlani
- Reneva Fourie
- Pat Horn
- Matlalepula Lkoma
- Zingiswa Losi
- Celiwe Madlopha
- Dibolelo Mahlatsi
- Fikile Majola
- Mugwena Maluleke
- Buti Manamela
- Gwede Mantashe
- Ben Martins
- Alex Mashilo
- Stan Mathabatha
- Chris Matlhako
- Barry Mitchel
- Phumzile Mnguni
- Mabuse Mpe
- Dipuo Mvelase
- Andries Nel
- Tinyiko Ntini
- James Nxumalo
- Grace Pampiri
- Tebogo Phadu
- Rudolph Phala
- Solly Phetoe
- Yershen Pillay
- Zola Saphetha
- Jenny Schreiner
- Fisani Shabangu
- Mike Shingange
- Jerry Thibedi
- Lechesa Tsenoli
- Joyce Tsipa
- Bulelwa Tunyiswa
- Langa Zita

== Historical membership ==
=== 14th National Congress Central Committee (2017–2022) ===
==== Leadership ====
- General Secretary: Blade Nzimande
- First Deputy General Secretary: Solly Afrika Mapaila
- Second Deputy General Secretary: Chris Matlhako
- National Chairperson: Senzeni Zokwana
- Deputy National Chairperson: Thulas Nxesi
- National Treasurer: Joyce Moloi-Moropa

==== Elected members ====
- Frans Baleni
- Sheila Barsel
- Yunus Carrim
- Jeremy Cronin
- Rob Davies
- Sidumo Dlamini
- Lindelwa Dunjwa
- Reneva Fourie
- Fezeka Loliwe (died 2018)
- Zingiswa Losi
- Celiwe Madlopha
- Khaya Magaxa
- Fikile Majola
- Mandla Makupula (died 2018)
- Mugwena Maluleke
- Buti Manamela
- Gwede Mantashe
- Joyce Mashamba (died 2018)
- Phumulo Masualle
- Madala Masuku
- Stanley Mathabatha
- Dipuo Mvelase
- Godfrey Oliphant
- Grace Pampiri-Bothman
- Phel Parkies
- Gwebinkundla Qonde
- Jeff Radebe
- Jenny Schreiner
- Sechaba Charles Setsubi (died 2018)
- Nomvuzo Shabalala (died 2020)
- Jerry Thibedi
- Lechesa Tsenoli
- Bulelwa Tunyiswa
- Adrian Williams

==== Co-opted members ====
In June 2019, the following individuals were co-opted onto the Central Committee:

- Polly Boshielo
- Nomarashiya Caluza
- Mluleki Dlelanga
- Koliswa Fihlani
- Pat Horn
- Mzwandile Makwaiba
- Alex Mohubetswane Mashilo
- David Masondo
- Yershen Pillay

Sydney Mufamadi, Essop Pahad, Charles Nqakula, and David Niddrie were also co-opted onto the committee as "veterans".

=== 13th National Congress Central Committee (2012–2017) ===
==== Leadership ====
- General Secretary: Blade Nzimande
- First Deputy General Secretary: Jeremy Cronin
- Second Deputy General Secretary: Solly Afrika Mapaila
- National Chairperson: Senzeni Zokwana
- Deputy National Chairperson: Thulas Nxesi
- National Treasurer: Joyce Moloi-Moropa

==== Members ====
- Frans Baleni
- Sechaba Charles Setsubi
- Sheila Barsel
- Jenny Schreiner
- Yunus Carrim
- Lechesa Tsenoli
- Rob Davies
- Fiona Tregenna
- Lindelwa Dunjwa
- Mandla Makupula
- Fezeka Loliwe
- Phel Parkies
- Gwede Mantashe
- Sidumo Dlamini
- Phumulo Masualle
- Jeff Radebe
- Chris Matlhako
- Grace Bothman
- Fikile Majola
- Godfrey Oliphant
- Ben Martins
- Jerry Thibedi
- Joyce Mashamba
- Adrian Williams
- George Mashamba
- Buti Manamela
- Madala Masuku
- Bulelwa Tunyiswa
- Willies Mchunu
- Judy Malqueeny
- Crosby Moni
- Celiwe Madlopha
- Dipuo Mvelase
- Gwebinkundla Qonde
- Nomonde Rasmeni
- Reneva Fourie

=== 12th National Congress Central Committee (2007–2012) ===
==== Leadership ====
- National Chairperson: Gwede Mantashe
- Deputy Chairperson: Ncumisa Kondlo (died during the term; Central Committee appointed Joyce Moloi to serve as Deputy National Chairperson)
- General Secretary: Blade Nzimande
- Deputy General Secretary: Jeremy Cronin
- National Treasurer: Phumulo Masualle

==== Members ====
- Frans Baleni
- Joyce Moloi
- Sheila Barsel
- Crosby Moni
- Yunus Carrim
- Chris Matlhako
- Rob Davies
- Dipuo Mvelase
- Lindelwa Dunjwa
- Zukiswa Ncitha
- Nozizwe Madlala-Routledge
- Charles Nqakula
- Fikile Majola
- Thobile Ntola
- Solly Afrika Mapaila
- Godfrey Oliphant
- Ben Martins
- Gwebinkundla Qonde
- Joyce Mashamba
- Nomonde Rasmeni
- George Mashamba
- Jenny Schreiner
- David Masondo
- Sechaba Charles Setsubi
- Madala Masuku
- Jerry Thibedi
- Noluthando Mayende-Sibiya
- Lechesa Tsenoli
- Willies Mchunu
- Senzeni Zokwana

The Central Committee co-opted three additional members – Eric Mtshali, Kay Moonsamy, and John Nkadimeng – as "veterans".
