= Gwede Mantashe =

South African politician (born 1955)

The Honourable Gwede Mantashe MP
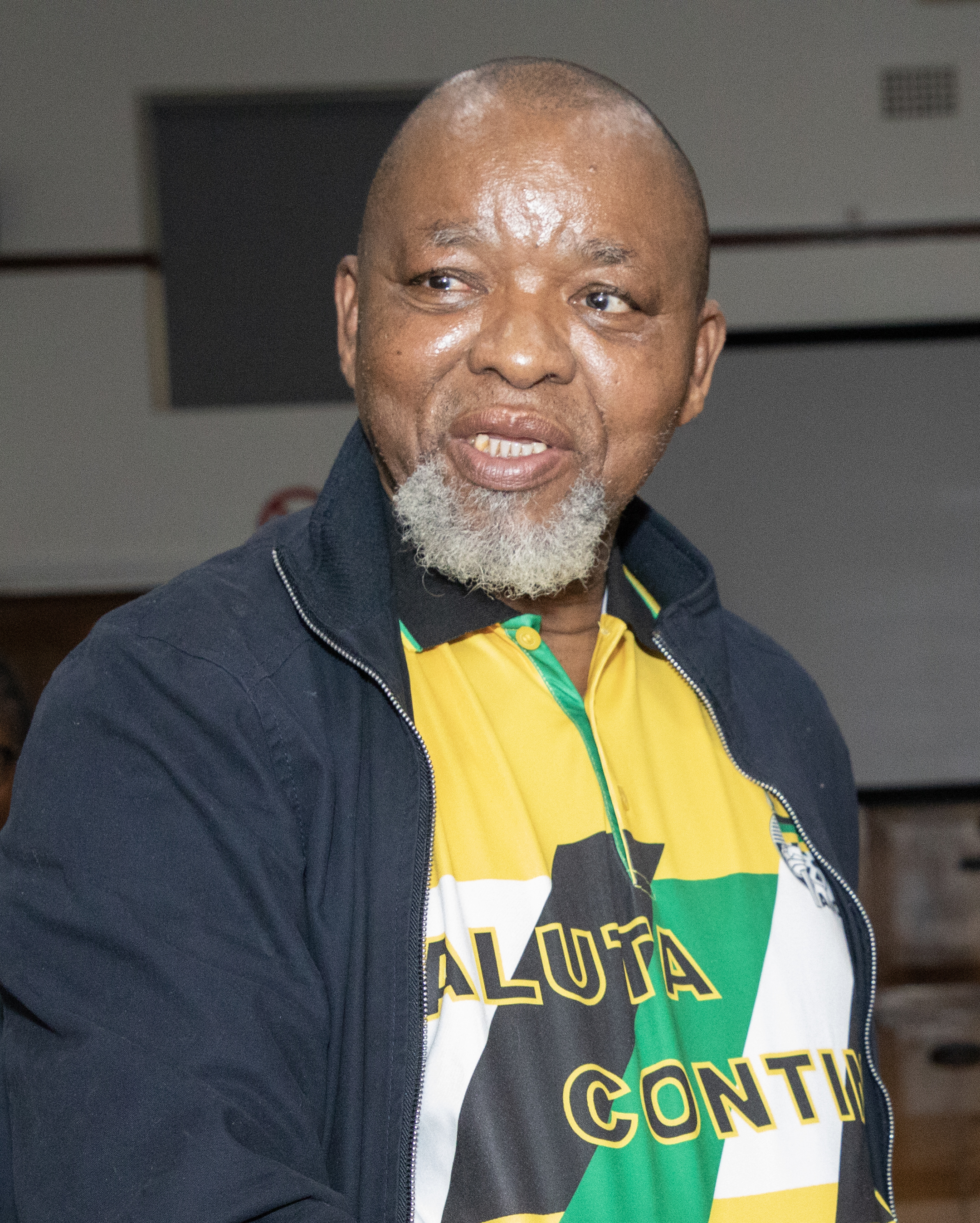
- Mantashe in November 2022

Minister of Mineral and Petroleum Resources
- Incumbent
- Assumed office 3 July 2024
- President: Cyril Ramaphosa
- Deputy: Judith Nemadzinga-Tshabalala
- Preceded by: Himself (for Mineral Resources and Energy)

15th Secretary-General of the African National Congress
- In office 18 December 2007 – 18 December 2017
- President: Jacob Zuma
- Preceded by: Kgalema Motlanthe
- Succeeded by: Ace Magashule

Member of the National Assembly
- Incumbent
- Assumed office 22 May 2019
- Constituency: National list

National Chairperson of the African National Congress
- Incumbent
- Assumed office 18 December 2017
- Preceded by: Baleka Mbete
Ministerial offices 2018‍–‍2024
Minister of Mineral Resources and Energy
In office 29 May 2019 – 19 June 2024
| President | Cyril Ramaphosa |
| Deputy | Bavelile Hlongwa; Nobuhle Nkabane |
| Preceded by | Himself (for Mineral Resources); Jeff Radebe (for Energy) |
| Succeeded by | Himself (for Mineral and Petroleum Resources); Kgosientsho Ramokgopa (for Electricity and Energy) |
Minister of Mineral Resources
In office 27 February 2018 – 7 May 2019
| President | Cyril Ramaphosa |
| Deputy | Godfrey Oliphant |
| Preceded by | Mosebenzi Zwane |
| Succeeded by | Himself (for Mineral Resources and Energy) |
Additional offices 1998‍–‍2012
National Chairperson of the South African Communist Party
In office July 2007 – July 2012
| Preceded by | Charles Nqakula |
| Succeeded by | Senzeni Zokwana |
3rd Secretary-General of the National Union of Mineworkers
In office 1998 – May 2006
| President | James Motlatsi; Senzeni Zokwana |
| Preceded by | Kgalema Motlanthe |
| Succeeded by | Frans Baleni |

Personal details
- Born: Samson Gwede Mantashe; 21 June 1955 (age 71) Lower Cala, South Africa
- Party: African National Congress
- Other political affiliations: South African Communist Party (Tripartite Alliance)
- Spouse: Nolwandle Mantashe
- Relatives: Priscilla Tozama Mantashe (sister)
- Education: University of South Africa; University of the Witwatersrand; Management College of Southern Africa
- Occupation: Politician; activist

Samson Gwede Mantashe (born 21 June 1955) is a South African politician and former trade unionist who is currently serving as the Minister of Mineral and Petroleum Resources. He has been responsible for the mineral resources portfolio since February 2018, formerly as Minister of Mineral Resources from February 2018 to May 2019 and then as Minister of Mineral Resources and Energy from May 2019 to June 2024. He is also serving his second term as the national chairperson of the African National Congress (ANC).

Born in the Eastern Cape, Mantashe rose to political prominence through the National Union of Mineworkers (NUM), which he joined at his workplace at Matla Colliery. He rose through the union's ranks, becoming a full-time organiser in 1988 and then deputising Kgalema Motlanthe as the NUM's assistant general secretary from 1994 to 1998. He succeeded Motlanthe as general secretary from 1998 to 2006. During this period, he was also an influential member of the Central Committee and Politburo of the South African Communist Party (SACP).

After he ceded his union office to Frans Baleni in May 2006, Mantashe worked briefly at the Development Bank of Southern Africa. At the ANC's 52nd National Conference in Polokwane in December 2007, he was elected as secretary-general of the ANC, a full-time position which he held for a decade, gaining re-election in December 2012. He served concurrently as national chairperson of the SACP from 2007 to 2012. During his tenure as ANC secretary-general, he had a controversial role in defending President Jacob Zuma against internal dissent and allegations of state capture.

After two terms as secretary-general, Mantashe was elected as ANC national chairperson at the party's 54th National Conference in December 2017. President Cyril Ramaphosa appointed him to the cabinet shortly thereafter, with his portfolio enlarged after the 2019 general election and then shrunk again after the 2024 general election. His public-facing work as minister has been dominated by the ongoing energy crisis in South Africa and by proposals for a so-called just energy transition. In that context, Mantashe has been criticised for his overt interest in coal, natural gas, and powerships, arguably at the expense of investment in renewable energy sources. He was elected to a second term as ANC national chairperson in December 2022, by then an important political ally of President Ramaphosa.

In August 2025 he was removed from the SACP Central Committee, but he remains a member.

== Early life and education ==
Mantashe was born on 21 June 1955 in Lower Cala, a village in the Transkei region of the former Cape Province. He attended Matanzima High School in Cala, where his classmate Enoch Godongwana said he was "a noisemaker, even then". He became politically active in his youth as an activist in the Student Christian Movement.

He attended university after the end of apartheid, completing a Bachelor of Commerce in 1997 and an Honours in 2002, both at the University of South Africa. He also holds a Master's degree in industrial sociology from the University of the Witwatersrand, completed in 2008, and a Master of Business Administration from the Management College of Southern Africa, completed in 2021.

== Early trade union career ==
For 13 years, Mantashe worked above-ground in mining in the Cape Province and Transvaal, beginning in 1975 with a brief stint as a recreation officer at Western Deep Levels, an Anglo American gold mine in Carletonville, Transvaal. From later in 1975 until 1982, he was the welfare officer at Prieska Copper Mines outside Kimberley in the Cape Province. Then, in 1982, he moved to the Matla Colliery in the Eastern Transvaal, where he co-founded the Witbank branch of the National Union of Mineworkers (NUM), a national union newly established under the leadership of Cyril Ramaphosa.

He was chairperson of the Witbank branch from 1982 to 1984, and in 1985 he was elected as regional secretary. In 1987, he stood for election as assistant general secretary of the national NUM but lost narrowly to Marcel Golding, who received 572 votes to his 552. The following year, he became a professional unionist, working as a national organiser for the NUM until he was promoted to regional coordinator in 1993.

In 1994, in a contest against Archie Palane, he won election as assistant general secretary, deputising Ramaphosa's successor, Kgalema Motlanthe. During his term in that office, he also served part-time in the post-apartheid government as a local councillor in Ekurhuleni from 1994 to 1999. In addition, in 1995, he was appointed to the board of directors of Samancor, a chrome producer listed on the Johannesburg Stock Exchange. This was an unusual move for a trade unionist at the time – it made national headlines – and Mantashe explained that it represented a shift in industrial relations away from "confrontation" and towards "meaningful influence" by workers over corporate decision-making.

== NUM general secretary: 1998–2006 ==
After four years as assistant general secretary, Mantashe was elected in 1998 to succeed Motlanthe as general secretary. Motlanthe had stepped down after his election as the secretary-general of the African National Congress (ANC).

According to Raphaël Botiveau's history of the NUM, Mantashe's eight-year tenure was notable for his emphasis on discipline and democratic centralism as organising principles, as well as for increasingly sophisticated bureaucratic management. In Botiveau's assessment, Mantashe made the NUM "more organised and disciplined than it had ever been" and "turned it into a powerful machine". Early in his tenure, Joseph Mathunjwa was expelled from the NUM and established a breakaway union, the Association of Mineworkers and Construction Union.

=== Tripartite Alliance ===
During Mantashe's leadership of the union, the NUM was the largest affiliate of the Congress of South African Trade Unions (Cosatu), which was linked to the South African Communist Party (SACP) by way of the Tripartite Alliance. Mantashe had been a member of the SACP Central Committee and Politburo since 1995. Indeed, his critics said that, under his leadership, the NUM became uncomfortably close to the SACP. He was also a member of the ANC, Cosatu's other Tripartite Alliance partner. At the ANC's 51st National Conference in December 2002, he was nominated to stand for election to the ANC National Executive Committee, but he was not elected.

=== Succession and aftermath ===
Mantashe stepped down from the NUM leadership at the union's 12th national conference in May 2006. He was succeeded by Frans Baleni, who was viewed as his protégé. After that, he served two years as executive manager for strategic initiatives at the Development Bank of Southern Africa, where he was also the chairperson of the technical working group of the Joint Initiative for Priority Skills Acquisition.

A year after leaving the NUM, in July 2007, Mantashe was elected unopposed to succeed Charles Nqakula as national chairperson of the SACP. He served under general secretary Blade Nzimande, with Ncumisa Kondlo as his deputy. Within six weeks of his SACP election, he had emerged as a frontrunner for election to higher ANC office too.

== ANC secretary-general: 2007–2017 ==
At the ANC's 52nd National Conference, held in December 2007 in Polokwane, Mantashe was elected as ANC secretary-general. He succeeded Kgalema Motlanthe, who was also his predecessor at the NUM. He had stood on a slate of candidates aligned to successful presidential candidate Jacob Zuma; their slate had been endorsed by Cosatu and by the ANC Youth League. The opposing candidate, Mosiuoa Lekota, stood on a slate aligned to outgoing president Thabo Mbeki; Mantashe received 2,378 votes to Lekota's 1,432.

Among his first tasks upon taking office was managing the fall-out from the 52nd National Conference, which intensified divisions between supporters of Mbeki and supporters of Zuma. In September 2008, it was Mantashe who announced that the ANC National Executive Committee had decided to "recall" Mbeki from his office as President of South Africa. In the aftermath, when Lekota and Sam Shilowa broke away from the ANC to establish the Congress of the People (COPE), Mantashe oversaw the ANC's programme to compete with COPE and recoup support lost to the new party in the 2009 general election. In the summation of journalist Stephen Grootes, "What threatened to become a split [in the ANC] became only a splinter", which Grootes credited partly to Mantashe's management of the situation.

Mantashe was re-elected to a second term at the 53rd National Conference in Mangaung in December 2012. On that occasion, again running alongside Zuma, he beat Fikile Mbalula in a landslide, receiving 3,058 votes against Mbalula's 908.

=== SACP chairmanship ===
In tandem with his ANC responsibilities, Mantashe served the remainder of his five-year term as SACP national chairperson, although his dual roles sometimes caused tensions in the Tripartite Alliance. In December 2009, supporters of ANC Youth League president Julius Malema called for Mantashe to choose between the two positions after Malema and Tony Yengeni were booed at an SACP gathering in Polokwane. The ANC Youth League accused Mantashe of failing to defend Malema, as they argued the ANC secretary-general should, because his dual roles gave rise to a conflict of interest. Irvin Jim of the National Union of Metalworkers defended Mantashe, saying that Malema had taken an "anti-Cosatu and anti-SACP posture, a stance that is unprovoked" and that "Mantashe is being singled out and targeted because he is a communist".

At the next SACP congress, held at the University of Zululand in July 2012, Mantashe declined a nomination to stand for re-election as chairperson. In his outgoing speech to the congress, he said that he was stepping down on practical grounds, saying, "Being an official in both parties is just impossible. It leads a person to be an absentee chairperson in the party. That is a disservice to the party". However, he said he was "grateful" for the experience, having gained "a broader horizon from which we could observe each individual component of our revolution" and emerged with "a deeper understanding of the contradictions in the movement".

Senzeni Zokwana, also of the NUM, was elected to succeed him as chairperson, and he was elected to return as an ordinary member of the SACP Central Committee; he received the most votes of any candidate. He was also re-elected to the Central Committee at the next congress in 2017, though from 2017 onwards he dropped off the party's politburo.

=== Defence of Jacob Zuma ===
The post of secretary-general was based full-time out of ANC headquarters at Luthuli House in Johannesburg, and Mantashe – despite financial difficulties in the ANC during his tenure – was viewed as wielding particular power in the office, especially during his second term. Described by the Mail & Guardian as "cantankerous", he was renowned among journalists for telephoning them to remonstrate about their reporting. Richard Calland labelled him "the ultimate political traffic warden inside and outside the ANC". His tenure lasted throughout Zuma's two terms in the national presidency, which were marred by allegations that his administration had been captured by business interests. Mantashe's critics alleged that he was a key figure in the ANC's efforts to shield Zuma from accountability. In 2013, for example, after the notorious Waterkloof Air Base landing, Mantashe maintained that the nature of Zuma's relationship with the Gupta family was not ANC business.

Similarly, he was a prominent figure in the ANC's successful campaign to thwart the multiple motions of no confidence that opposition parties lodged against Zuma in Parliament. In June 2017, the Constitutional Court ruled in response to an application by the United Democratic Movement that Members of Parliament should vote with their conscience in motions of no confidence and that the Speaker of the National Assembly therefore had the power to prescribe a secret ballot in such motions. Former ANC MP Makhosi Khoza later said that Mantashe had told the party's representatives to ignore the Constitutional Court's advice and that, in Khoza's summation, "anyone who sought to uphold the rule of law will be severely punished". Indeed, Mantashe openly warned in 2017 that ANC MPs who voted in favour of motions of no confidence risked disciplinary action, including dismissal; he said that the ANC did not subscribe to the notion of conscience votes in such matters. Mantashe told the Daily Maverick in June 2017 that ANC support for a motion of no confidence in Zuma would be still more destabilising than the events that led to the formation of COPE in 2008: "The recall of Thabo Mbeki will be like a Sunday picnic."

There is no ANC member who will vote for an opposition motion, that will be uncharacteristic of the ANC... What do you think the ANC is, Father Christmas? I don't know where this notion comes from that we are a collection of individuals who have conscience. We are members of ANC in a party political system. No army in the world allows soldiers to be commanded by enemy general.

— Mantashe responds to calls for ANC representatives to vote with their conscience against President Zuma, April 2017

Mantashe continued to defend this view years later, telling the Zondo Commission, a public inquiry into state capture, that party discipline on such matters was essential to ensuring the stability of the ANC and therefore the stability of the government and country. He argued that allowing the party's own representatives to vote against their leader would lead to serious division and political crisis, and would therefore be tantamount to cutting off your nose to spite your face. He said that the ANC allowed conscience votes on other issues, but:

...on political matters that affect the heart of the ANC, we cannot allow a free-for-all. The ANC is a political party with policies. People who go to parliament on an ANC list understand those policies and go on the basis of implementing those policies.

He also defended the ANC's practice of cadre deployment, which some critics blamed for facilitating state capture; among other things, Mantashe argued that cadre deployment was a necessary means to transforming the apartheid-era civil service that the ANC had inherited.

During Zuma's presidency, Mantashe's primary concern was to obstruct parliamentary no-confidence motions lodged by opposition parties. He was much more sanguine about the prospect of Zuma being removed from the ANC presidency – and thereafter from the national presidency – by his own party through internal ANC mechanisms. He was open in admitting that Zuma faced internal dissent and in speculating that he could be removed from the national presidency after he was succeeded as ANC president. By mid-2017, he said openly that state capture was "a reality", explicitly dismissing attempts by Zuma's supporters to redirect public focus to so-called white monopoly capital. He told international press that revelations of state capture, involving ANC politicians, were damaging the party's reputation, and he called for the establishment of a judicial inquiry into the allegations at a time when Zuma was resisting such calls. He also welcomed the Gupta leaks.

Mantashe later said that he and other ANC leaders had first become concerned about the Gupta family's influence after the Waterkloof landing in 2013. Observers first noticed tensions two years later, after the controversial December 2015 cabinet reshuffle in which Zuma replaced Finance Minister Nhlanhla Nene with Des van Rooyen. In what was described as a turning point for Mantashe, the ANC responded coldly to the reshuffle, and Mantashe personally was apparently involved in forcing Zuma to reverse van Rooyen's appointment. When the new Finance Minister, Pravin Gordhan, faced fraud charges three months later, Mantashe was supportive of Gordhan, and he released a statement on behalf of the ANC expressing concern about the fraud investigation and reaffirming the party's confidence in Gordhan.

Gordhan was sacked in another controversial reshuffle in October 2017, and News24's sources said that Mantashe had been among the party leaders who had attempted to persuade Zuma to retain Gordhan. Mantashe confirmed that he had disagreed with Zuma, saying that "for the first time", Zuma had had to invoke his constitutional prerogative as national president to overrule the ANC on the composition of the cabinet. However, several days later, Mantashe appeared to reverse himself, telling the press that the ANC had decided to accept Zuma's decision – and his justification of an "irretrievable breakdown" of his relationship with Gordhan – and to "close ranks" around the president. This and similar reversals led social media to devise the verb "Mantash", popularised by Julius Malema, to describe such backtracking. Yet when Zuma sacked Blade Nzimande of the SACP from the cabinet in October 2017, Mantashe was again publicly critical: he said that the party had not been consulted, called the decision a "pity", and warned that frequent reshuffles could destabilise the government. By the end of 2017, journalists suspected that Mantashe's personal relationship with Zuma had seriously deteriorated.

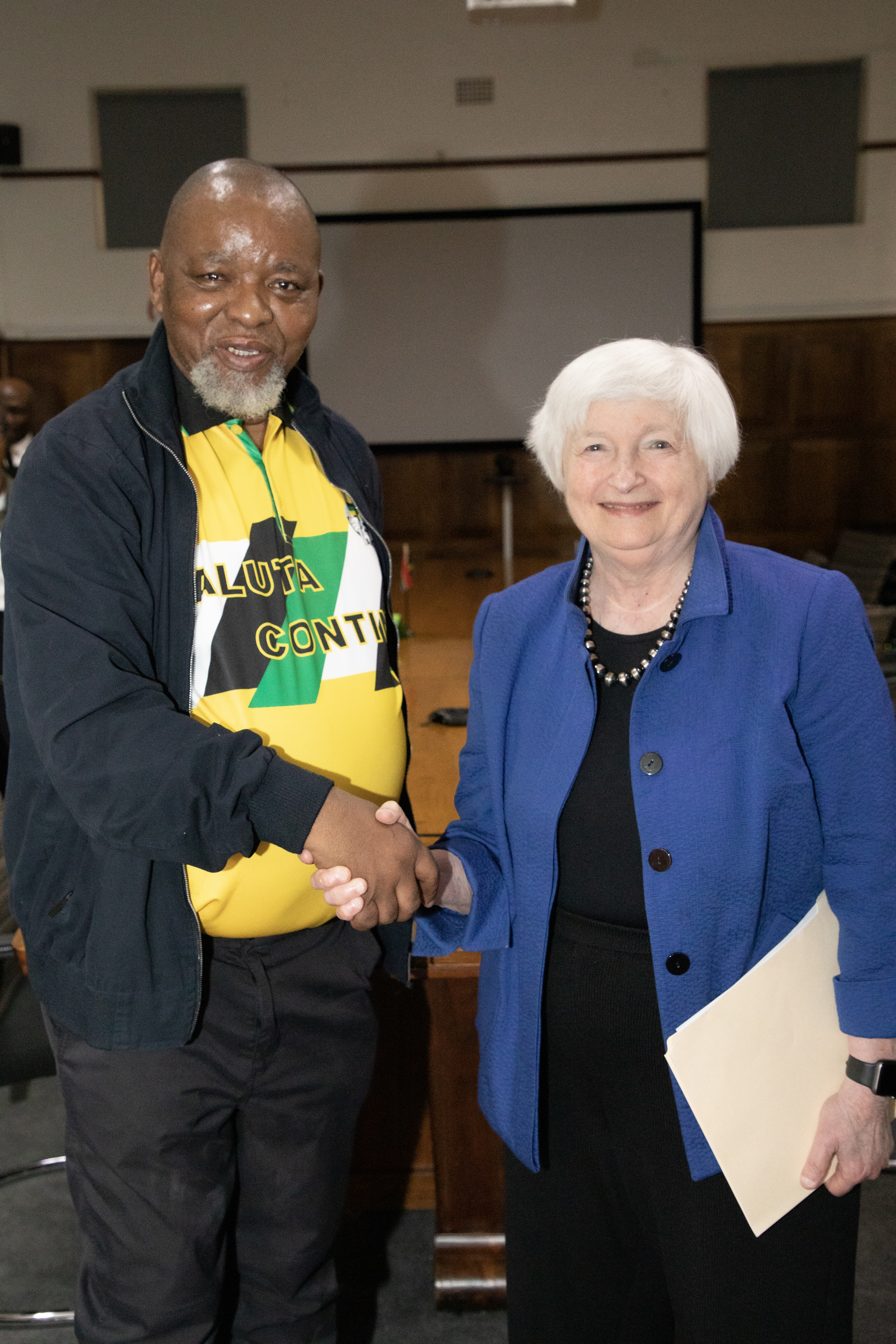
Mantashe with US Treasury Secretary Janet Yellen in 2022

=== Nasrec conference and aftermath ===
At the ANC's 54th National Conference in December 2017, Mantashe did not stand for re-election as secretary-general but instead was elected as the ANC's national chairperson. He beat Nathi Mthethwa in a vote, receiving 2,418 votes against Mthethwa's 2,269. Ace Magashule was narrowly elected to succeed him as secretary-general. For some time before the election, Mantashe was viewed as broadly aligned to the winning presidential candidate, NUM founder and deputy president Cyril Ramaphosa, who had publicly announced that Mantashe was his preferred candidate for the chairmanship. In turn, Mantashe had endorsed Ramaphosa's presidential run, to the consternation of Ramaphosa's opponents in the ANC leadership; he argued that the ANC had a tradition of leadership succession by the deputy president, which he said should be maintained in the interest of stability.

Mantashe Tweeted lightheartedly that, having vacated the full-time ANC secretariat, he was "unemployed" and looking for a job. Meanwhile, in the aftermath of the conference, Ramaphosa's supporters set about effecting Zuma's recall from the Presidency of South Africa, threatening to support a parliamentary motion of no confidence if he did not resign voluntarily. Mantashe said at a political rally in Butterworth, "When you resist the call to resign you leave us no choice but to let you fry in the vote of no-confidence motion because it means you do not respect the organisation [the ANC]".

== Minister of responsible for Mineral Resources: 2018–present ==
After Ramaphosa was elected to succeed Zuma as President of South Africa in February 2018, he appointed Mantashe to his cabinet in a reshuffle on 26 February. Mantashe was named to replace Mosebenzi Zwane as Minister of Mineral Resources. At the time his appointment was welcomed by the Chamber of Mines and Business Leadership South Africa. He was one of two ministers appointed from outside Parliament, until he was elected to a seat in the National Assembly in the May 2019 general election. After the 2019 election, announcing his second cabinet, Ramaphosa announced a ministerial merger that saw Mantashe take over an enlarged portfolio as Minister of Mineral Resources and Energy. In February 2023, as a direct result of the worsening electricity crisis in the country, Ramaphosa appointed Kgosientso Ramokgopa as a new Minister in the Presidency for Electricity, indicating that this function would be located within the presidency for a limited period. On 30 June 2024, following the 2024 general election, this change was made permanent by Ramokgopa being appointed as Minister of Electricity and Energy, with Mantashe's ministerial portfolio being limited to that of Mineral and Petroleum Resources.

=== Acting Minister of Police ===
On 13 July 2025 Mantashe was appointed by President Cyril Ramaphosa to act in the position of Police Minister with immediate effect. This came after Senzo Mchunu whom Ramaphosa suspended, was linked to alleged corruption in the police service by KwaZulu-Natal provincial police commissioner, Nhlanhla Mkhwanazi.

=== Just energy transition ===
Mantashe took office as Minister of Mineral Resources and Energy amid a decades-long energy crisis in South Africa, caused by a shortfall in electricity generation capacity. Among his first tasks was to draft an updated Integrated Resource Plan, and he said that his ministry would consider all energy sources in devising a solution to the crisis. However, the media soon nicknamed him "Old King Coal" for his outspoken defence of the dominance of coal in South African energy supply, an arrangement that he said would "outlive many of us". He also embraced being labelled a "coal fundamentalist" by the media and – according to him – by President Ramaphosa.

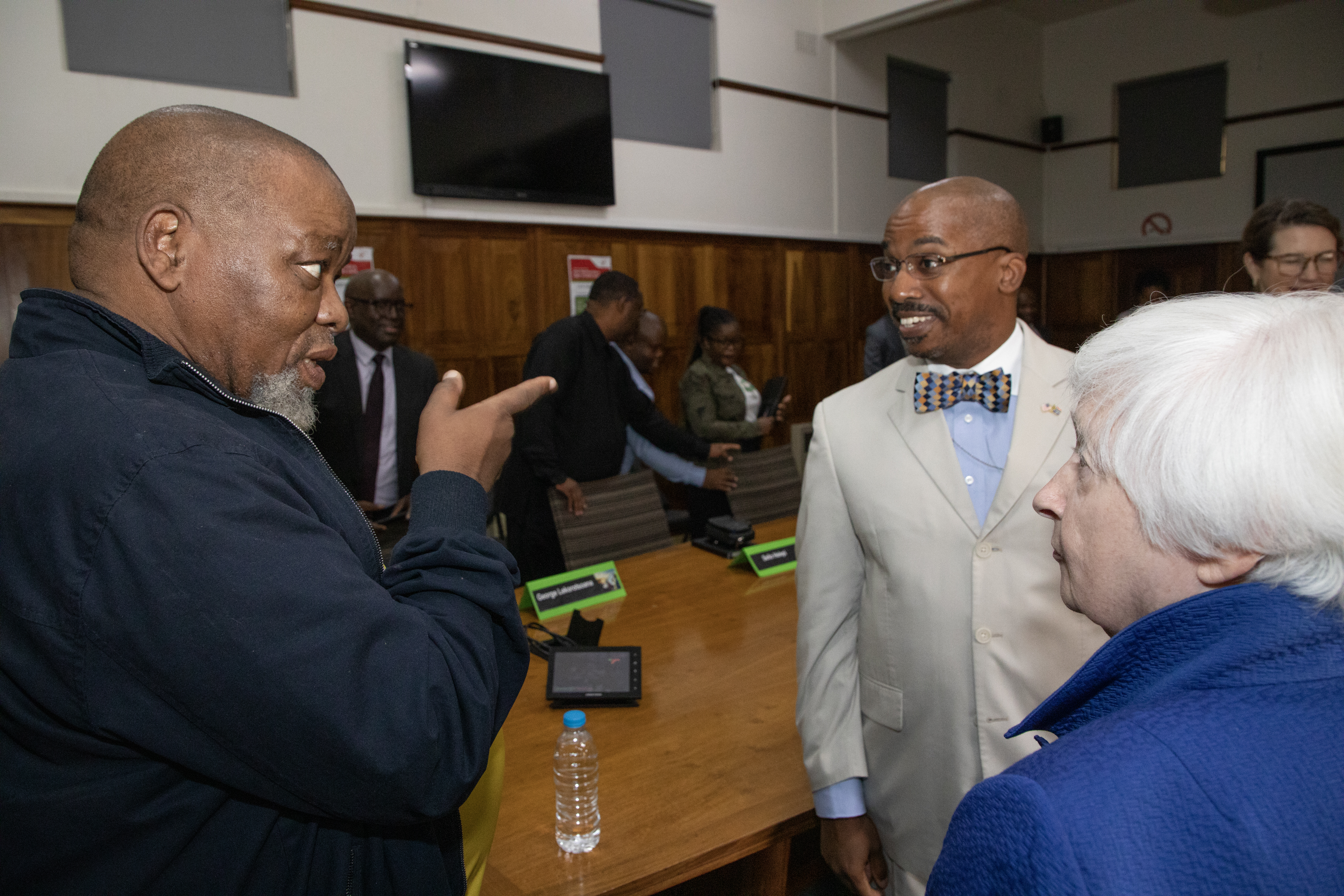
Mantashe with Yellen and Reuben Brigety in November 2022

Mantashe linked his support for the coal sector to the notion of the so-called just energy transition, the outcome of which would be socially equitable as well as environmentally sustainable, as envisaged in the National Development Plan. In his view, there was consensus in South Africa on the need for an energy transition in the sense of a reduction in carbon emissions to respond to the global climate crisis; however, he disputed whether that imperative implied a transition from coal to renewable energy sources. He argued that South Africa had abundant coal resources, that the coal sector contributed to the South African economy and black entrepreneurship, and that decommissioning coal power plants too hastily would harm the livelihoods of coal-mining communities and exacerbate the shortage of energy generation capacity. For these reasons, Mantashe pronounced coal an important element of the just energy transition.

Mantashe's critics alleged that he obstructed the approval of new energy generation projects, thus delaying the energy transition and the resolution of the electricity crisis. Writing in the Business Day, Anthony Butler said that, "Mantashe resembles the King Canute of energy: an old man trying to hold back the tides." On another occasion, in what was interpreted as veiled criticism of Mantashe, Crispian Olver of the Presidential Climate Commission said that, "the old idea that someone’s sitting in charge of [the Department of] Mineral Resources and Energy could dictate the pace at which this transition happens – it's the emperor with no clothes."

He was also unpopular with environmental activists for his defence of Shell's right to conduct gas exploration off the Wild Coast, as well as for his proposal to procure powerships at the country's major ports. In December 2021, he accused opponents of the Shell project of "apartheid and colonialism of a special type, masqueraded as a great interest for environmental protection." He also launched several public attacks on André de Ruyter, the chief executive officer of power utility Eskom; de Ruyter resigned in December 2022 shortly after Mantashe alleged that "Eskom, by not attending to load shedding, is actively agitating for the overthrow of the state".

In this context, during his February 2023 State of the Nation Address, Ramaphosa announced the establishment of a new Minister in the Presidency for Electricity. Observers raised the prospect that the new ministry would tranche on existing portfolios, possibly creating conflict between Mantashe and the new minister, Kgosientso Ramokgopa, as well as with the Minister of Public Enterprises, Pravin Gordhan, who oversaw Eskom. In May 2023, Ramaphosa gave Ramokgopa responsibility for procuring new electricity generation capacity, until then a function of Mantashe's department. The following month, in what was perceived as a challenge to Ramaphosa's authority, Mantashe did not attend a high-level meeting for the signing of Ramaphosa's $1-billion green energy agreement with the Netherlands and Denmark.

This thing of saying destroy coal quickly is second to Nongqawuse... a prophet who said we must kill all our cattle and we will be rich. We are still waiting for those riches. I'm saying, you don’t destroy what you have on the basis of hope that something better is coming. You build on what you know and what you have.

— Mantashe on the renewable energy transition, January 2022

On 30 June 2024, following the 2024 general election, the allocation of electricity to Ramokgopa was made peremanent, with him being appointed as Minister of Electricity and Energy, with Mantashe's ministerial portfolio being limited to that of Mineral and Petroleum Resources. On 3 July 2024, they were both sworn in regarding their respective portfolios.

=== Zondo Commission finding ===
On 1 March 2022, the Zondo Commission published the installment of its report on Bosasa, which included the recommendation that Mantashe should be investigated for criminal corruption. The recommendation arose from Mantashe's relationship with a former Bosasa director, who in 2013 – while Mantashe was ANC secretary-general – had arranged for Bosasa to install security systems free of charge at Mantashe's three homes (one in Cala, one in Boksburg, and one in Khowa). In testimony to the inquiry, Mantashe had confirmed that the security installations were made for free, but denied that there was anything untoward in the arrangement, saying, among other things, that he was "not amenable to bribes". The commission's report concluded that Bosasa, which was a state contractor in correctional services, had widely bribed ANC politicians. In Mantashe case, it registered "reasonable suspicion" that Mantashe had received the free upgrades in the knowledge that they were intended as inducements in exchange for political influence.

The day after the report was published, Mantashe said that he would not step aside unless and until "there has been an investigation and a case to answer". He continued to deny wrongdoing and said that he would take the report on judicial review.

=== ANC chairmanship ===
Mantashe was re-elected to the SACP Central Committee in July 2022, though, the following month, he lamented the weakness of the Tripartite Alliance after he was heckled while trying to address Cosatu's national congress. In December 2022, the ANC's 55th National Conference re-elected him to another five-year term as ANC national chairperson. His re-election was hotly contested by Stan Mathabatha and David Masondo, but he won narrowly, receiving 2,062 votes against Mathabatha's 2,018 and Masondo's 282. The Ramaphosa camp again supported his candidacy, reportedly after mooting the idea of endorsing Mathabatha instead in order to ensure the support of Mathabatha's home province, Limpopo.

The media labelled Mantashe as a key member of the so-called "Chris Hani cabal" in the ANC – a group close to Ramaphosa, also including Mondli Gungubele and Enoch Godongwana, which "fought the rearguard battle" in defending Ramaphosa during the Phala Phala scandal and on other occasions. The Africa Report called Mantashe Ramaphosa's "enforcer". However, by mid-2023, observers including Max du Preez suspected that Mantashe might have his own presidential ambitions.

=== Mantashe vs Trump ===
In early February 2025 US president Donald Trump said that he would cut aid to South Africa because of his concerns about white Afrikaaners. The aid amounted to $440 million. Tension flared when Cyril Ramaphosa signed into law the Expropriation Act. Trump said that with its land expropriation policy, "South Africa is confiscating land and treating certain classes of people very badly". He warned that the US would "cut off all future funding to South Africa until a full investigation of this situation has been completed". Mantashe replied that he could bar the export of minerals to the US in a speech at the 31st Investing in African Mining conference. Meanwhile Scott Woodard, the acting deputy assistant secretary of state for energy transformation at the US Department of State, spoke at the same conference and laid out an ambitious plan to finance African mineral resources. A recent report said that the US was 100% reliant on minerals import for 12 critical materials, amongst which were graphite, nickel, cobalt and rare earths. South Africa's leading export to the US included platinum, iron and manganese. Mantashe's call to other African nations would sink the US critical materials strategy. An expert said that the African Growth and Opportunity Act (AGOA) could be rescinded from South Africa and it would no longer benefit from duty-free trade with the US. South Africa benefitted from AGOA: $2.7 billion in exports were sent from there in 2023.

== Personal life ==
He is married to Nolwandle Mantashe, who is a nurse. They have four adult children, two sons and two daughters. In 2014, he said of his children, "I usually give them a long lecture which says there is no qualification which is called Mantashe. If you want to survive in life go to school, study and be yourself and not be a Mantashe as a qualification, that should be your surname and that's it."

His younger sister, politician Priscilla Tozama Mantashe, died of COVID-19 complications in January 2021.

== See also ==
- Energy in South Africa
- Electricity sector in South Africa
- History of the African National Congress

Trade union offices
| Preceded by Kgalema Motlanthe | General Secretary of the National Union of Mineworkers; 1998–2006 | Succeeded by Frans Baleni |
