= Langa Zita =

South African politician

Member of the National Assembly
- In office June 1999 – May 2009
- Constituency: Gauteng

Personal details
- Born: 7 December 1967 (age 58)
- Citizenship: South Africa
- Party: African National Congress
- Other political affiliations: South African Communist Party; Congress of South African Trade Unions

Langa Zita (born 7 December 1967) is a South African politician and intellectual who represented the African National Congress (ANC) in the National Assembly from 1999 to 2009, serving the Gauteng constituency. A former regional organiser for the Congress of South African Trade Unions (COSATU) and a former political education officer at the South African Communist Party (SACP), Zita has served all three wings of the Tripartite Alliance. He was a member of the SACP Central Committee from 1998 to 2002.

After leaving Parliament in 2009, Zita served as a special adviser to Minister Tina Joemat-Pettersson and then, from 2010 to 2012, as her Director-General in the Department of Agriculture, Forestry, and Fisheries. He left that position in September 2012.

== Early life and career ==
Zita was born on 7 December 1967. He was formerly the regional secretary of COSATU in the Witwatersrand and by 1995 was the national education officer of the SACP.

In 1998, Zita was elected to the Central Committee of the SACP, the party's executive organ. However, in his account, the leadership elected alongside him in 1998 – headed by Blade Nzimande – was dominated by "doctrinaire Marxist-Leninists" who were largely uninterested in promoting democracy or the renewal of the party. He later said that, during this period, he was "purged" from the SACP's head office and the party abandoned the national political education programmes he had developed.

== Parliament: 1999–2009 ==
Zita was elected to represent the ANC in the National Assembly in the 1999 general election and served two terms, gaining re-election in 2004. He represented the Gauteng constituency.

Midway through his first term, at an SACP congress in 2002, Zita failed to gain re-election to the Central Committee; his critics said that, since joining Parliament, he had radically altered his views and become a supporter of President Thabo Mbeki's neoliberal Growth, Employment and Redistribution (GEAR) policy. However, he reportedly remained a close ally of COSATU secretary-general Zwelinzima Vavi.

During part of his second term in Parliament, he chaired the Portfolio Committee on Environmental Affairs and Tourism.

== Civil service: 2010–2012 ==
Zita left Parliament in the 2009 general election and became a special policy adviser to Tina Joemat-Pettersson, then the Minister of Agriculture, Forestry, and Fisheries, a newly created portfolio. He reportedly became one of Joemat-Pettersson's closest advisers and "closely involved in departmental decision-making". In September 2010, President Jacob Zuma appointed him as Director-General of Joemat-Pettersson's department.

However, less than two years later, on 26 June 2012, the department announced that Zita had been suspended. An official press release said that the suspension was "an administrative matter" and gave no further reasons. The opposition Democratic Alliance (DA) welcomed his suspension, saying that he had "done little to put this struggling department back on a solid footing", as did Agri SA, which described Zita as an example of the pitfalls of cadre deployment and criticised his "ignorance of and sluggish way of addressing problems of commercial agriculture".

In September 2012, the department reported that Zita and Joemat-Pettersson had "mutually agreed to part ways amicably". The department bought him out of the rest of his contract with a payout of over R1.6 million. The DA objected that the public had a right to know why he had been suspended, but no further explanation was forthcoming. City Press reported that Zita and Joemat-Pettersson had "bumped heads" over plans for the department to spend R800 million on a development project in President Zuma's hometown.

As of 2018, Zita was director of political education and training for the Gauteng branch of the ANC.
