= 51st National Conference of the African National Congress =

Elective meeting of the African National Conference for the year 2002

← 1997	16–20 December 2002	2007 →

3,400 party delegates
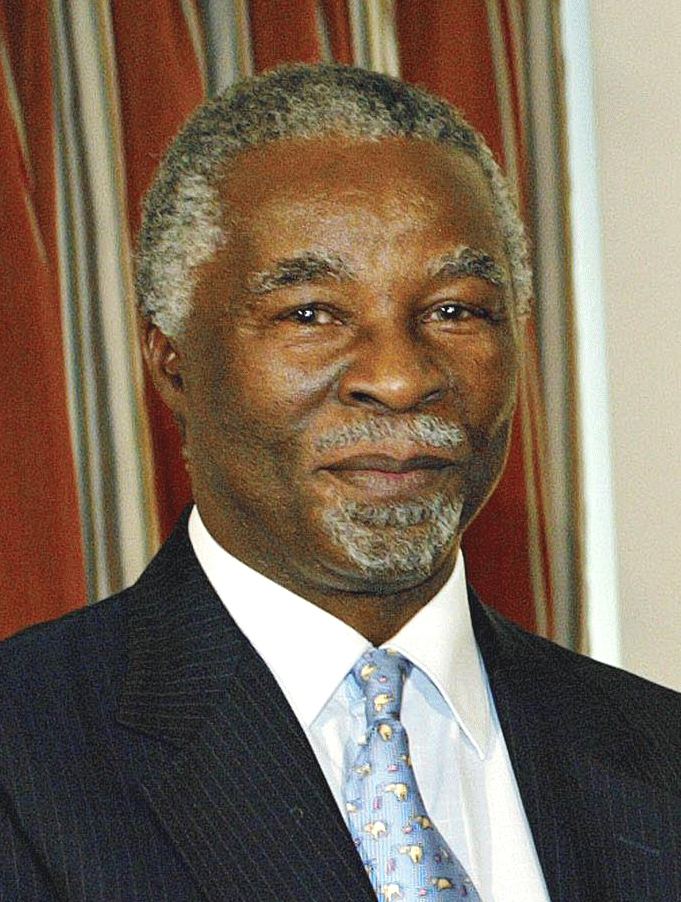
Candidate	Thabo Mbeki
Delegate vote	Unopposed
President before election
Thabo Mbeki
Elected President
Thabo Mbeki

The 51st National Conference of the African National Congress (ANC) was held at the University of Stellenbosch in Stellenbosch, Western Cape, from 16 to 20 December 2002, during the ANC's 90th anniversary. President Thabo Mbeki was re-elected to the party presidency and, notably, there was no change in other five top leadership positions except for Deputy Secretary General. There was also little competition for other spots on the National Executive Committee (NEC). This ANC conference has thus been called "the quietest in its history."

The theme of the conference was "People's Power in Action – Phambili Mavoluntiya – Afrika ke Nako." 3,400 voting delegates attended, including 3,060 from the provincial branches. The Zimbabwean ruling party, Zanu-PF, were also invited as observers. Alongside Mbeki, the conference re-elected Jacob Zuma as Deputy President, Kgalema Motlanthe as Secretary General, Terror Lekota as National Chairperson, and Mendi Msimang as Treasurer General; the new addition was Sankie Mthembi-Mahanyele, who was appointed unopposed as Deputy Secretary General when the incumbent declined to take another term.

Despite tensions within the party – including rumours of potential electoral challenges to Mbeki and other top leaders – and between Mbeki and the ANC's Tripartite Alliance partners, the only significant disagreement among delegates was about a resolution supporting Black Economic Empowerment, which was ultimately adopted. The conference is often remembered for Mbeki's biting speech during the closing session, which some commentators believe exacerbated divisions between Mbeki and the party's left wing. At the 2004 general elections, to which the conference was a precursor, the ANC won a supermajority of 69.69% of the national vote, the most it had won since 1994 or has won since.

== Background ==
The lack of conflict at the conference was not a result of harmony within the ANC – scandals related to the Arms Deal and HIV/AIDS denialism were ongoing, and there had been several highly public internal disputes in the preceding months. Minister of Safety and Security Steve Tshwete had publicly accused Cyril Ramaphosa, Tokyo Sexwale, and Mathews Phosa, all popular senior ANC members, of spearheading a political conspiracy against Mbeki, including by spreading rumours that Mbeki had been complicit in the assassination of Chris Hani in 1993. At the same time, Mbeki's relationship with Winnie Mandela had visibly worsened. Moreover, a letter to Deputy President Jacob Zuma had been leaked to the media, in which Mandela said that Mbeki had accused her of spreading rumours that he was a philanderer and asked Zuma to intervene. Mbeki's relationship with Zuma also declined, and in 2001 Zuma announced publicly that he had no presidential ambitions, reportedly because he was asked to by the NEC. Historian Tom Lodge has interpreted these and other public spats as efforts by Mbeki loyalists to defend him against potential challengers at the 2002 conference.

Our movement will have to take stern action against those who have thus acted to divide our movement, even as they sat among us wearing ANC T-shirts.

– Thabo Mbeki's closing speech to the 51st Conference

By 2002, Mbeki's relationship with the ANC's Tripartite Alliance partners, the South African Communist Party (SACP) and the Congress of South African Trade Unions (COSATU), had become highly (and publicly) acrimonious, particularly due to disputes over his neoliberal economic policies. Although this acrimony did not translate into open conflict at the conference, it did result in some of the conference's most tense and memorable moments. There was "lively debate" over resolutions supporting Black Economic Empowerment and the developmental role of "the emergent black capitalist class." The resolutions passed, with some opposition expressed by the unions and none expressed by the SACP. In his closing address, Mbeki attacked what he called "ultra-leftists" who attempted to sow division and factionalism in the ANC. He threatened them with "stern action" for having distributed at the conference so-called special lists of their preferred NEC nominees.

== Leadership election ==
The conference appointed the following individuals to the ANC's "Top Six" positions:

- President: Thabo Mbeki
- Deputy President: Jacob Zuma
- Secretary General: Kgalema Motlanthe
- Deputy Secretary General: Sankie Mthembi-Mahanyele
- National Chairperson: Terror Lekota
- Treasurer General: Mendi Msimang

In 2001, there had been rumours that a group within the ANC might try to unseat Mbeki, perhaps with Zuma or Joel Netshitenzhe as the challenging candidate. There had also been rumours that some provinces planned to support Nkosazana Dlamini-Zuma for the chairmanship, that certain groups planned to support Lekota for the deputy presidency, and that other leftist groups planned to retract their support for Motlanthe. However, ultimately, none of the positions were contested. The provinces had only nominated incumbents of the Top Six, and no nominations were proposed from the floor of the conference. Mthembi-Mahanyele was appointed unopposed as Deputy Secretary General when the incumbent, Thenjiwe Mtintso, declined a second term on the grounds of ill health; there were no other changes to the composition of the Top Six between 1997 and 2007.

== Election of the National Executive Committee ==
The additional 60 members of the NEC were elected from a very short list of 71 nominees, 36 of whom had been unanimously supported by all nine provinces during the nominations phase. There were 101 nominees at the beginning of the conference, but some names were removed, reportedly as a result of horse-trading between provinces. Gwede Mantashe, the Secretary General of the National Union of Mineworkers (NUM), was not included on the consolidated list – according to some accounts, he withdrew his nomination in order to sidestep the tensions between COSATU, of which NUM was an influential member, and the ANC. Businessman and former Mpumalanga Premier Mathews Phosa was dropped from the consolidated list, but was nonetheless elected to the NEC. The results of the voting were announced at the beginning of the closing session on 20 December, and the following candidates received the most votes, in order:

1. Trevor Manuel (2,800 votes)
2. Cyril Ramaphosa (2,778 votes)
3. Nkosazana Dlamini-Zuma
4. Thoko Didiza
5. Penuell Maduna
6. Winnie Madikizela-Mandela
7. Sydney Mufamadi
8. Kader Asmal
9. Zola Skweyiya
10. Pallo Jordan
