= Godfrey Oliphant =

South African politician (born 1959)

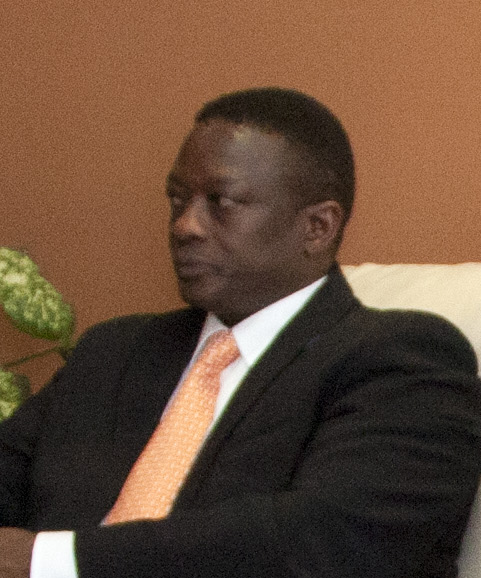
- Oliphant in 2012

Deputy Minister of Mineral Resources
- In office 1 November 2010 – 7 May 2019
- President: Jacob Zuma; Cyril Ramaphosa
- Minister: Susan Shabangu; Ngoako Ramatlhodi; Mosebenzi Zwane; Gwede Mantashe
- Preceded by: Office established
- Succeeded by: Bavelile Hlongwa (for Mineral Resources and Energy)

Member of the National Assembly
- In office 5 August 2009 – 7 May 2019
- In office 9 May 1994 – April 2009

Personal details
- Born: Gaolatlhe Godfrey Oliphant; 27 March 1959 (age 67) Warrenton, Cape Province; Union of South Africa
- Party: African National Congress
- Other political affiliations: South African Communist Party; Congress of South African Trade Unions

Gaolatlhe Godfrey Oliphant (born 27 March 1959) is a South African politician and former trade unionist from the Northern Cape. He was the Deputy Minister of Mineral Resources between November 2010 and May 2019. A member of the African National Congress, he served in the National Assembly of South Africa from May 1994 to May 2019, excepting a three-month hiatus in 2009.

Oliphant began his career as a mineworker at De Beers's Finsch mine, where he rose to prominence as a shop steward and organiser for the National Union of Mineworkers. He went on to hold senior office in all three wings of the Tripartite Alliance: he served as deputy provincial chairperson of the ANC in the Northern Cape, as national vice-president of the Congress of South African Trade Unions, and, between 1995 and 2022, as a member of the Central Committee of the South African Communist Party.

== Early life and education ==
One of a family of eight, Oliphant was born on 27 March 1959 in Warrenton in the former Cape Province (present-day Northern Cape). He was raised in Warrenton by his mother, who was a domestic worker. After finishing his primary education in 1974 in Warrenton, he attended Huhudi High School in Vryburg, where he became involved in anti-apartheid politics. He matriculated in 1979.

== Trade union activism ==
After a brief stint as a storeman at an Edgars store, in 1980 Oliphant was hired at the Finsch mine, a De Beers diamond mine near Lime Acres, Northern Cape. He later said that, infected with political "militancy" at high school, the living and working conditions of his fellow mineworkers politicised him further. Later in 1980 he was involved in a major wildcat stay-away at the mine. Through the influence of trade union organiser Manne Dipico, the Finsch mineworkers joined the National Union of Mineworkers (NUM) after it was founded in 1982; Oliphant became the chairperson of the Finsch branch. A formal recognition agreement was concluded in 1986 and Oliphant was elected as the mine's full-time shop steward in 1988.

The NUM was a major affiliate of the Congress of South African Trade Unions (COSATU) and, also in 1988, Oliphant was elected as the chairperson of COSATU's largest regional branch, which covered the Northern Cape and Orange Free State. By 1992 he was second national vice-president of COSATU, while still serving as full-time shop steward at Finsch. He also served on the regional and national executive committees of the NUM. He developed a particular interest in political education, chairing both the NUM's branch education committee and COSATU's national education committee.

Oliphant also became involved in structures of both of COSATU's Tripartite Alliance partners, the African National Congress (ANC) and South African Communist Party (SACP). He became involved in ANC activities in the late 1980s while the parties were still banned, and in 1990 he was appointed to the interim regional leadership corps that established the ANC's legal structures in the Northern Cape. He also became chairperson of the SACP's local branch in Warrenton.

== Legislator: 1994–2010 ==
In South Africa's first post-apartheid elections in April 1994, Oliphant was elected to represent the ANC in the National Assembly, the lower house of the new South African Parliament. He served in his seat for the next 25 years, gaining re-election to five consecutive terms. He was briefly absent from the National Assembly for three months after the April 2009 general election, when he failed to gain re-election to his seat, but he was sworn back in on 5 August 2009 to fill the casual vacancy created by Ngconde Balfour's resignation.

During the First Parliament, Oliphant was the inaugural chairperson of the Portfolio Committee on Labour, which at the time was processing the major Labour Relations Bill. In this period he was at the peak of his influence inside the ANC: between 1994 and 1998, he served two terms as deputy provincial chairman of the ANC's Northern Cape branch. Indeed, he was viewed as a plausible candidate to challenge unionist Manne Dipico for the provincial chairmanship of the party. In addition, at the SACP's 9th National Congress in 1995, he was elected to the first of six consecutive terms on the SACP Central Committee.

In later years in Parliament, Olifant chaired the Portfolio Committee on Public Works and Portfolio Committee on Minerals and Energy. He also served as the ANC's whip in the Portfolio Committee on Communications, and he was acting chairperson of that committee during the Third Parliament. However, in August 2007 he was replaced by Ismail Vadi and transferred to the chair of the less prestigious Portfolio Committee on Science and Technology, a demotion that was regarded as the result of his lukewarm relationship with President Thabo Mbeki. Maintaining his interest in political education, he served a stint as chairperson of the study group for ANC committee chairpersons.

== Deputy minister: 2010–2019 ==
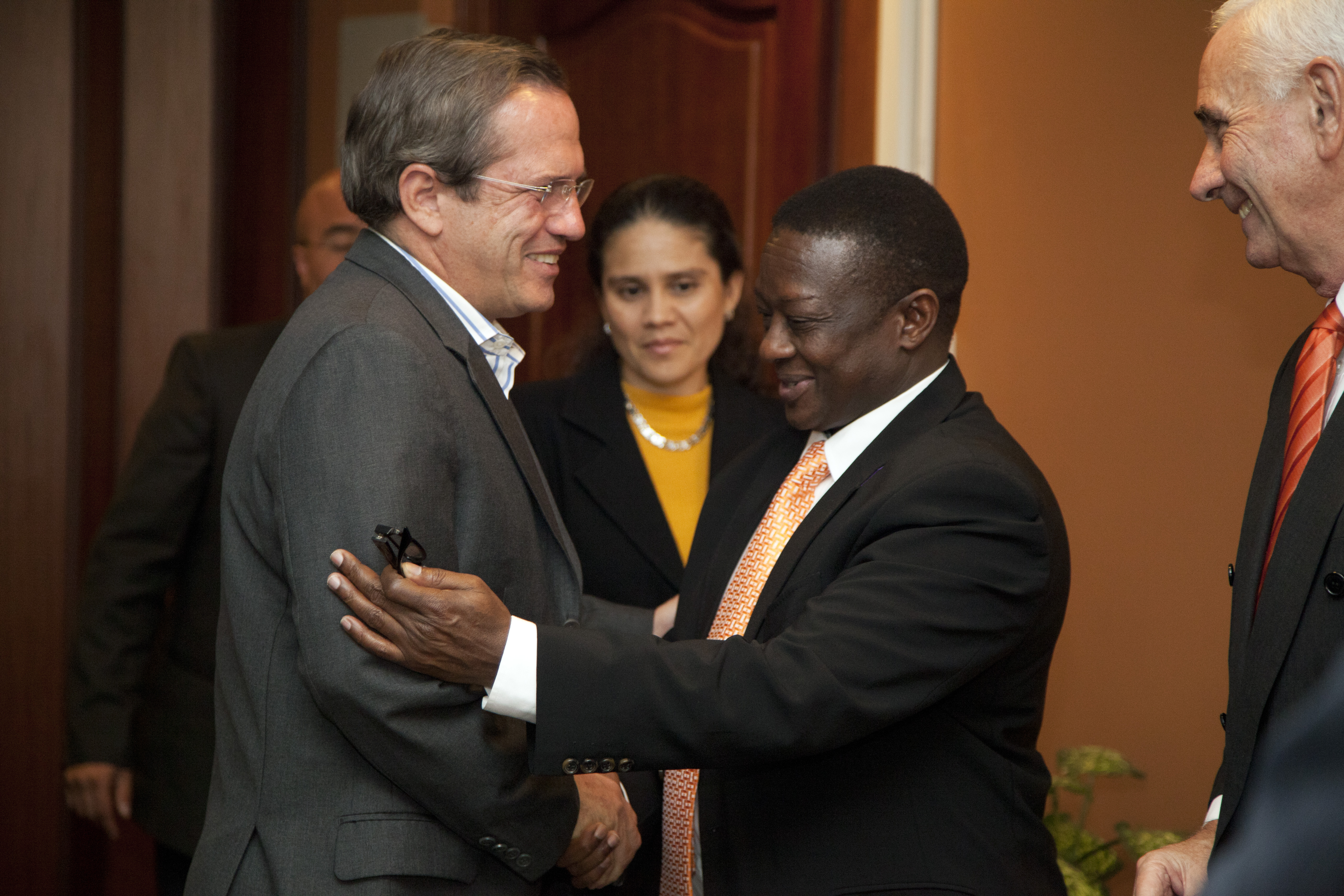
Oliphant with Ecuadorian Foreign Minister Ricardo Patiño in Quito, 31 May 2012

On 31 October 2010, in his first cabinet reshuffle as President of South Africa, Jacob Zuma appointed Oliphant as Deputy Minister of Mineral Resources. The Ministry of Mineral Resources had been established after the 2009 election, under the leadership of Minister Susan Shabangu, but it had not had a deputy minister until 2010; Zuma said that he was establishing the deputy post in recognition of the importance of the mining sector to the South African economy.

In his first two years in office, Oliphant faced a "gigantic" defeat in the Northern Cape ANC when, at a June 2012 elective conference in Upington, he ran against John Block in a bid to win the ANC provincial chairmanship. He received only 32 votes to Block's 496.

He nonetheless continued to serve as Deputy Minister of Mineral Resources through the remainder of the Fourth Parliament and the entirety of the Fifth Parliament, a period that spanned the rest of Zuma's presidency. During that time he served under three consecutive Mineral Resources Ministers: Shabangu was succeeded by Ngoako Ramatlhodi after the 2014 general election, and then by Mosebenzi Zwane after a 2015 cabinet reshuffle. His duties included the chairmanship of the Presidential Inter-Ministerial Committee on Revitalising Distressed Mining Communities, which reported directly to President Zuma's office. The Mail & Guardian said that he was "respected for his work in Parliament and his knowledge of the sector", as well as "close to Zuma". Conversely, Miningmx agreed that he was "capable and knowledgeable of the industry" but regarded him as unlikely to be promoted to a cabinet position "owing to the fact he doesn't carry huge favour with Zuma".

After Cyril Ramaphosa took office as president in February 2018, Oliphant was retained as Deputy Minister of Mineral Resources under new Minister Gwede Mantashe. However, he did not seek re-election to Parliament in the May 2019 general election. He continued to serve on the SACP Central Committee until its next national congress in July 2022, after which he dropped off the committee for the first time since 1995.

== Personal life ==
Oliphant has been married since 1986 and has three children, two daughters and one son. In August 2013, his 31-year-old niece was raped and murdered in Ikutseng, Warrenton.

As of 2012 he owned seven properties. In January 2014, the SPCA in Kimberley reported that it had sent Oliphant a warning after inspecting his Kaktusplaas farm in Warrenton; it threatened to confiscate the 20 pigs reared on the farm if Oliphant did not improve their living conditions. Oliphant's spokesperson said that the pigs belonged to and were cared for by Oliphant's family but that Oliphant was cooperating fully with SPCA inspectors.
