= Celiwe Madlopha =

South African politician

Celiwe Madlopha MPL

Member of the KwaZulu-Natal Provincial Legislature
- Incumbent
- Assumed office 22 May 2019

Member of the National Assembly
- In office 17 November 2010 – 7 May 2019
- Constituency: KwaZulu-Natal

Personal details
- Citizenship: South Africa
- Party: African National Congress
- Other party: South African Communist Party

Celiwe Qhamkile Madlopha is a South African politician who has represented the African National Congress (ANC) in the KwaZulu-Natal Provincial Legislature since 2019. Before that, she was a Member of the National Assembly between 2010 and 2019. She is also a former Provincial Chairperson of the ANC Women's League in KwaZulu-Natal.

== Political career ==
Madlopha was active in the Congress of South African Students in her youth in the 1980s. She was formerly the Deputy Mayor of Umhlathuze Local Municipality and she was sworn in to an ANC seat in the National Assembly in November 2010. In March 2012, she was elected Provincial Chairperson of the KwaZulu-Natal branch of the ANC Women's League in a fierce contest with the outgoing chairperson, Lungi Mnganga-Gcabashe; Nonhlanhla Khoza was elected alongside her as Provincial Secretary.

She was re-elected to her first full term in Parliament in the 2014 general election, ranked third on the ANC's regional party list for KwaZulu-Natal. However, she left her ANC Women's League office in September 2017, when Khoza was elected to succeed her.

In the 2019 general election, Madlopha did not stand for re-election to the national Parliament, but instead was elected to a seat in the KwaZulu-Natal Provincial Legislature, ranked 39th on the ANC's provincial party list. She remained active in the ANC – her local regional branch was the Musa Dladla branch in King Cetshwayo District – and in July 2022 she was elected to a four-year term on the Provincial Executive Committee of the party's KwaZulu-Natal branch. In addition, she was elected to three consecutive five-year terms as a member of the Central Committee of the South African Communist Party, in 2012, 2017, and 2022.

== Personal life ==
She was married to Bonginkosi Elphas Madlopha, a Christian minister and a local leader in the ANC and the South African National Civic Organisation. He died in February 2014 shortly after he and his wife arrived in Cape Town for the 2014 State of the Nation Address.
