= Mduduzi Manana =

South African politician (born 1984)

Member of the National Assembly
- In office 6 May 2009 – 24 July 2018

Deputy Minister of Higher Education and Training
- In office 12 June 2012 – 19 August 2017
- President: Jacob Zuma
- Minister: Blade Nzimande
- Preceded by: Hlengiwe Mkhize
- Succeeded by: Buti Manamela

Personal details
- Born: Mduduzi Comfort Manana; 12 February 1984 (age 42) Ermelo, Eastern Transvaal; South Africa
- Party: African National Congress
- Parent: Sibongile Manana
- Education: University of Natal
- Nickname: Mdu

Mduduzi Comfort Manana (born 12 February 1984) is a South African politician from Mpumalanga. He was the Deputy Minister of Higher Education and Training from 2012 to 2017 and represented the African National Congress (ANC) in the National Assembly from 2009 to 2018.

Manana rose to political prominence through the ANC Youth League and was aged 28 when President Jacob Zuma appointed him as a deputy minister in June 2012. He resigned from that office in August 2017 after he was charged with assaulting three women outside a Johannesburg nightclub; he pled guilty to the charges the following month. He remained an ordinary member of the National Assembly until July 2018, when he submitted to ongoing pressure to resign.

Manana has been a member of the ANC National Executive Committee since December 2017. Since early 2023, he has worked full-time for the party as head of organising at Luthuli House.

== Early life and career ==
Manana was born on 12 February 1984 in Ermelo in the former Eastern Transvaal (present-day Mpumalanga). He is the only child of Sibongile Manana, a single mother and politician of the African National Congress (ANC). He became involved in politics as a teenager, joining the Congress of South African Students and ANC Youth League in 1998.

In March 2003, he was one of 31 members of the Iraq Action Committee who travelled from South Africa to Baghdad to volunteer as human shields ahead of the American-led invasion of Iraq. Then aged 19 and the proprietor of an event management company, he told the press that he was "going to protest oppression and injustice – freedom and justice are causes for which I am prepared to die." He returned home earlier than planned a week later, saying that he was severely traumatised by events in Baghdad.

Manana went on to complete a Bachelor of Arts in political science and sociology at the University of Natal. At the same time, he remained politically active, rising through the ranks of the ANC Youth League: in 2005, he was elected chairperson of the league's branch in Ermelo, as well as chairperson of the local branch of the South African Communist Party's Young Communist League; and in 2006 he was elected to the league's regional executive committee in the broader Gert Sibande district. During this period, he was twice convicted of criminal theft, on one occasion for stealing a can of Coca-Cola. He was elected to the ANC Youth League's National Executive Committee for the first time in 2008.

== Career in government: 2009–2018 ==
Manana stood as an ANC candidate in the 2009 general election and won a seat in the National Assembly, the lower house of the South African Parliament. According to the Mail & Guardian, he was the youngest Member of Parliament at the time. He served on two portfolio committees – the Portfolio Committee on Public Works and Portfolio Committee on International Relations and Cooperation – and he also represented Parliament on the Magistrate's Commission.

He was re-elected to the ANC Youth League National Executive Committee in June 2011, and he was also considered, by opponents of incumbent league president Julius Malema, as a possible contender to run for higher office in the league. In April 2012, Manana caused a minor stir by contradicting Malema's supporters in an interview with the New Age: Manana said that it was a "misrepresentation of the facts" to claim, as some had, that the league's leadership had resolved to support Malema even if he was convicted on disciplinary charges by the mainstream ANC. Manana's statement put him in alignment with President Jacob Zuma, who was pursuing Malema's removal, and his comments led league deputy president Ronald Lamola to condemn his "ill-discipline".

=== Appointment as Deputy Minister: 2012 ===
On 12 June 2012, President Zuma announced a cabinet reshuffle in which Manana was appointed as Deputy Minister of Higher Education and Training. He deputised Blade Nzimande and, aged 28, became the youngest deputy minister in the post-apartheid period. The promotion was rumoured to be a reward for defending Zuma's moves against Malema.

The South African Students Congress professed itself "utterly dismayed, taken aback, angry, flabbergasted, disappointed and annoyed" by Manana's appointment, saying in a statement, "We do not have any reason to believe that Mr. Manana is up to the task of being a deputy minister of such a complex and strategic department." Manana defended himself, pointing to his "energy" and personal experience in institutions of higher education, and argued that students ought not to "undermine the president and question his capacity to appoint members of the executive".

=== Assault conviction: 2017 ===
In the early hours of Sunday morning on 6 August 2017, Manana was involved in the assault of three women at a nightclub, Cubana, in Fourways in northern Johannesburg. The story broke in the media later on Sunday. One of the women, Mandisa Duma, told City Press that the altercation had begun inside the club with a heated political debate about whether Nkosazana Dlamini-Zuma or Cyril Ramaphosa should be chosen to succeed Zuma as ANC president. When the argument became hostile, Duma and her friends had left the club, one of them making a comment about Manana being gay, which apparently triggered the assault. In Duma's account, Manana had slapped one of the women and pulled her hair and then had slapped another outside the club, as Manana's friends attacked the others. In addition to video footage of part of the assault, which went viral on social media, press released an audio recording in which Manana appeared to confess to the assault. In the clip, Manana says in Zulu, "My brother, when she swore at me and called me gay, I slapped her".

On 7 August, Manana posted an apology to Twitter, writing, "Regardless of the extreme provocation, I should have exercised restraint. That shameful incident should not have happened." The opposition Economic Freedom Fighters called on Manana to resign and hand himself over to the police, and the police said that an arrest was imminent. He made his first court appearance in the Randburg Magistrate's Court on 10 August and was released on R5,000 bail. Journalists were not allowed inside the courtroom, leading to allegations that Manana was receiving preferential treatment, but Police Minister Fikile Mbalula said that he "will not be treated with special kid gloves but will face the full wrath of the law".

==== Sentencing ====
On 13 September 2017, Manana was convicted on three counts of assault with intent to do grievous bodily harm, having pled guilty to assaulting the women. In November, he was sentenced to pay a R100,000 fine in lieu of serving 12 months' imprisonment. He was also required to complete anger-management classes and 500 hours of community service, and to compensate the victims for their medical expenses (about R26,500 in total), and he was declared unfit to possess a firearm. Two other men pled guilty to involvement in the assault.

==== Resignation ====
On 19 August 2017, a week after Manana's first court appearance, the Presidency announced that Zuma had accepted Manana's resignation as Deputy Minister. Manana also released his own lengthy statement, admitting that his behaviour at Cubana was "shameful" and inexcusable. The ANC welcomed his resignation and thanked him for his service.

I am heart-broken and disappointed in myself as a leader of our great nation... It is clear that I have some 'personal' work to do. I have to get to the bottom of why I acted in the manner I did, and then address any underlying issues that prompted my unfortunate action. I believe this is the right thing to do for the country, for my organization and for me. Going forward, I have started seeking professional help so that I emerge as a stronger and better improved person. I have to deal with this problem so that I can continue serving my people as an effective member and leader in our society...
Fellow South Africans, you have every right to be angry at me and I deserve your anger in this matter because no matter how you look at it, it was wrong in every way. To this extent, I am sorry. I take all accountability and I promise that this will never happen again.

— Manana's resignation statement, 19 August 2017

Reportedly granted political leeway as a loyalist of President Zuma, Manana retained his seat as an ordinary member of the National Assembly. As a backbencher, he served on the Portfolio Committee on Human Settlements. In addition, in December 2017, the ANC's 54th National Conference elected him to his first five-year term as a member of the ANC National Executive Committee. By number of votes received, he was the 27th-most popular candidate of the 80 ordinary members elected to the committee.

=== Resignation from Parliament: 2018 ===
In early May 2018, media reported that Manana's domestic worker, Christine Wiro, had laid a complaint against him with the police, alleging that he had tried to push her down the stairs in his home in Fourways. Wiro later withdrew the complaint, but the Sunday Times reported that she did so after Manana offered her R100,000 as a "consolation". The newspaper said that it had an audio recording of Manana making the offer. Manana said that the recording in fact captured an attempt by Wiro and her family to blackmail him. He said that he would sue her for extortion and denied that he had assaulted her, conceding that there had been an "altercation" but saying that it had ended with him asking her to leave his house. The saga intensified calls for Manana to resign from Parliament, but the National Prosecuting Authority announced on 23 July that it would not prosecute Manana in relation to the incident.

However, also on 23 July, Parliament's Joint Committee on Ethics and Members' Interests announced that Manana would face a disciplinary inquiry to determine Parliament's response to his 2017 assault conviction. The following day – the day before his first scheduled appearance before the inquiry – Manana pre-empted the inquiry by announcing his resignation from Parliament. He said that he felt "totally exonerated" of Wiro's complaints against him, which he viewed as "rooted in a politically-motivated smear campaign against me by my political opponents", but he said that he had nonetheless decided to "focus my renewed energies on the work of my political organisation ahead of the 2019 general elections, my academic commitments and my business interests".

Announcing his commitment to "eliminating gender-based violence", Manana said that he would donate R1 million to Khuluma Ndoda, a new men's social movement against gender-based violence, and R500,000 to a campaign to distribute sanitary packs to African girls. ANC Chief Whip Jackson Mthembu said that Manana's voluntary resignation was "indicative of someone who has taken full responsibility and has shown remorse for his actions".

== Luthuli House: 2023–present ==
By February 2020, Manana said that he viewed himself as reformed, having resolved the anger issues that caused his outburst at Cubana; he reflected that, "I do not believe that women are angry, that South Africans are angry. I think they have forgiven me." However, due to the ANC's new rules about criminal convictions, he was initially disqualified from standing for re-election to the party's National Executive Committee. He succeeded in having the disqualification overturned and gained re-election at the ANC's 55th National Conference in December 2022. Indeed, he was the second-most popular candidate, behind Sihle Zikalala.

In the aftermath of his re-election, he was appointed to succeed Nomvula Mokonyane as the ANC's head of organising, a full-time position based out of ANC headquarters at Luthuli House in Johannesburg, and he was also retained as head of the ANC's National Dispute Resolution Committee. In addition, he was elected to the influential National Working Committee.
