= South African Democratic Teachers Union =

Trade union in South Africa

SADTU
- South African Democratic Teachers Union
- Founded: 6 October 1990
- Headquarters: Johannesburg, South Africa
- Location: South Africa
- Members: 254,000
- Key people: Magope Maphila, president Mugwena Maluleke, general secretary
- Affiliations: COSATU
- Website: www.sadtu.org.za

The South African Democratic Teachers Union (SADTU) is the largest trade union for teachers in South Africa. It is allied to the African National Congress and is an affiliate of the Congress of South African Trade Unions (COSATU).

== History ==
The union was founded in October 1990, when the National Education Union of South Africa merged with the Progressive Teachers' Union, the Mamelodi Teachers' Union, the Progressive Teachers' League, the Western Cape Teachers' Union and the East London Progressive Teachers' Union. In 1992, it affiliated to the Congress of South African Trade Unions. It engaged in widespread industrial action in order to achieve recognition, increase wages, and reform inspection procedures.

The union has rejected a proposal by the Department of Basic Education (DBE) for performance-agreement contracts for school principals, pointing out that employment contracts already outlines principals' obligations, and claiming that such performance agreements would be unfair in the light of poor resourcing and lack of skills at schools.

In 2017, the National Education Collaboration Trust began work with SADTU to improve teaching at the basic education level in the Eastern Cape and Limpopo provinces.

== Jobs for cash ==
In April, 2014, City Press reported that SADTU officials were running a racket, which involved accepting monetary bribes from educators in return for access to teaching or managerial positions. SADTU responded that the union was "only party to the filling of posts as observers to ensure the fairness" of the process.

The DBE subsequently set up a ministerial task team (MTT), headed by Professor John Volmink, to investigate. The MTT indicated that six provinces were affected by the racketeering: the North West, KwaZulu-Natal, Gauteng, Limpopo, Mpumalanga, and the Eastern Cape. Gauteng Education MEC Panyaza Lesufi admitted that his department was controlled by SADTU, and that the selling and buying of educational posts was "endemic". The Minister of Basic Education Angie Motshekga observed that the investigations implicated primarily SADTU, although other teachers unions and government officials were also involved.

The dysfunction in schools was attributed to "weak" government systems that had been "infiltrated" by a "complex patronage system". The report's conclusion was that SADTU's membership in the ANC's tripartite alliance gave it “enormous power and influence” over the education system, described the situation as “dangerous and inappropriate”, and found that it held the education system hostage to political processes.

Following the release of the MTT's report, which SADTU had stalled until May, 2016, NAPTOSA, the second-largest teachers union in the country, welcomed the "honest attempt to address a vexing problem" but accused the Volmink team of "union-bashing"; NATU, the third-largest teachers union, found the investigation lacking, and the following year called for a judicial commission of inquiry, which would be able to more substantively investigate the issue due to its judicial powers. SADTU objected that they were being singled out for scapegoating for the ills of South Africa's education system, and insisted that there was no evidence that SADTU had facilitated improper conduct.

A similar report by the SA Council of Educators found that the union as a whole had been involved, not just "a few rogue elements", as SADTU had maintained.

== KwaZulu-Natal ==
SADTU has blamed KwaZulu-Natal's provincial education department for the educator shortages in the province, blaming "the redistribution of teachers as a result of a post provisioning norms process". 2 800 teaching posts remained unfilled in the province in February, 2017.

== Criticism ==
The Economist, characterising South Africa's educational system as "one of the worst in the world", placed the blame on SADTU for "a lack of accountability and the abysmal quality of most teachers".

The Department of Basic Education itself has identified SADTU as an obstruction to government efforts to improve education, with Minister Motshekga describing the union's influence as a "stranglehold" on education.

== Leadership ==
=== General Secretaries ===
1990: Randall van den Heever
1995: Thulas Nxesi
2009: Mugwena Maluleke

=== Presidents ===
1990: Membathisi Mdladlana
1994: Duncan Hindle
1995: B. B. Mabandla
1996: Willie Madisha
2008: Thobile Ntola
2014: Magope Maphila
