= Mluleki Dlelanga =

South African politician

Mluleki Dlelanga MPL

Member of the Eastern Cape Provincial Legislature
- Incumbent
- Assumed office 22 May 2019
- In office May 2014 – February 2016

Personal details
- Born: 1978 (age 47–48)
- Citizenship: South Africa
- Party: African National Congress
- Other political affiliations: South African Communist Party

Mluleki Dlelanga (born 1978) is a South African politician who has represented the African National Congress (ANC) in the Eastern Cape Provincial Legislature since 2019. He previously served in the legislature from May 2014 to February 2016. He was National Secretary of the Young Communist League of the South African Communist Party (SACP) from 2014 to 2018 and he was elected to a five-year term on the Central Committee of the SACP in 2022.

== Political career ==
Dlelanga was born in 1978. In the 2014 general election, he was elected to an ANC seat in the Eastern Cape Provincial Legislature, ranked 36th on the ANC's provincial party list. At that time, he was the Provincial Secretary of the SACP's Young Communist League (YCL) in the Eastern Cape, and he was viewed as a frontrunner to succeed the longstanding National Secretary, Buti Manamela, who had announced that he would not seek re-election to a fourth term. At the league's fourth national congress, held in December 2014, Dlelanga was indeed elected as National Secretary, serving alongside Chairperson Yershen Pillay with Isaac Luthuli as his deputy.

He held the YCL post concurrently with his legislative office until February 2016, when he resigned from the legislature to take up the National Secretary post full time; his seat was filled by Pumelele Ndamase. Under Dlelanga, the YCL endorsed Deputy President Cyril Ramaphosa's successful campaign to succeed Jacob Zuma as ANC President at the party's 54th National Conference in 2017. By the end of his term, which coincided with the YCL's fifth national congress in early December 2018, Dlelanga was over the age of 40 and was not eligible to stand for another term as YCL National Secretary.

In the 2019 general election, he returned to the provincial legislature, ranked 19th on the ANC's party list. The month after the election, he was co-opted onto the Central Committee of the mainstream SACP, and he was elected to a full term on the committee in 2022.
