= Pumelele Ndamase =

South African politician

Pumelele Ndamase MPL

Member of the Eastern Cape Provincial Legislature
- Incumbent
- Assumed office 10 March 2016

Personal details
- Citizenship: South Africa
- Party: African National Congress

Pumelele Ndamase is a South African politician and former public servant who has represented the African National Congress (ANC) in the Eastern Cape Provincial Legislature since March 2016. He was secretary of the provincial legislature from 2009 to 2014 and before that he represented the ANC as a councillor in the Eastern Cape's OR Tambo District Municipality.

== Political career ==
=== Secretary of the Provincial Legislature: 2009–2014 ===
In 2009, Ndamase was appointed to a five-year term as secretary in the Eastern Cape Provincial Legislature. Prior to his appointment, he had been serving as an ANC councillor in the OR Tambo District Municipality, where he was a member of the Mayoral Committee. While in office as secretary, Ndamase had poor relations with the National Education, Health and Allied Workers' Union (Nehawu), which in June 2014 demanded his suspension from the position. He also later said that he had extremely poor relations with Noxolo Kiviet, who replaced Fikile Xasa as Speaker of the Eastern Cape Provincial Legislature in 2014.

Also during his tenure as secretary, Ndamase was elected to the ANC's Provincial Executive Committee in 2013. In the 2014 general election, he stood for election to the national Parliament, but he was ranked 163rd on the ANC's national party list and did not secure election to a seat. Ndamase later alleged that Kiviet had proposed that Ndamase should be sent to Parliament as part of an attempt to frustrate his political ambitions in the Eastern Cape; according to him, the proposal was opposed by Oscar Mabuyane, the incumbent ANC Provincial Secretary.

His contract as legislature secretary was not renewed in 2014 and he left office in 2015. The Daily Dispatch said that he was rumoured to be in line for another administrative appointment as head of the provincial Department of Cooperative Governance and Traditional Affairs.

=== Aftermath: 2015–2016 ===
In 2015, after his departure from the secretariat, an internal investigation implicated Ndamase in a sex-for-jobs scandal in the provincial legislature. He was not charged in the resulting disciplinary process because he no longer worked at the legislature. He continued to serve in the ANC Provincial Executive Committee; the Star reported that he spoke publicly against President Jacob Zuma at a March 2016 summit, criticising Zuma for his links to the controversial Gupta family. He also served as the ANC's provincial elections manager ahead of the 2016 local elections.

=== Member of the Provincial Legislature: 2016–present ===
On 10 March 2016, Ndamase was sworn in to an ANC seat as a Member of the Provincial Legislature in the Eastern Cape. He filled a casual vacancy arising from the resignation of Mluleki Dlelanga, who left the legislature to serve as National Secretary of the South African Communist Party's Young Communist League.

Nehawu stringently opposed his appointment and demanded its reversal, claiming that Ndamase had been permanently tainted by the sex-for-jobs scandal. In his capacity as ANC Provincial Secretary, Oscar Mabuyane issued a strong public response, accusing Nehawu of pursuing a "personal vendetta" against Ndamase and arguing that the legislature's internal investigation into the sex-for-jobs scandal had not found any firm evidence against Ndamase. Ndamase himself had earlier claimed, in court papers filed in December 2015, that Kiviet had "resuscitated the investigation relating to sex-for-jobs" as part of "an attempt on her part and those of her cronies to introduce impediments and frustrate my chances" of filling Dlelanga's seat in the provincial legislature.

Ndamase was re-elected to his first full term in the provincial legislature in the 2019 general election, ranked 28th on the ANC's party list. However, he had fallen off the ANC Provincial Executive Committee by 2022.
