= 50th National Conference of the African National Congress =

Elective meeting of the African National Congress for the year 1997

← 1994	16–20 December 1997	2002 →

3,000 party delegates
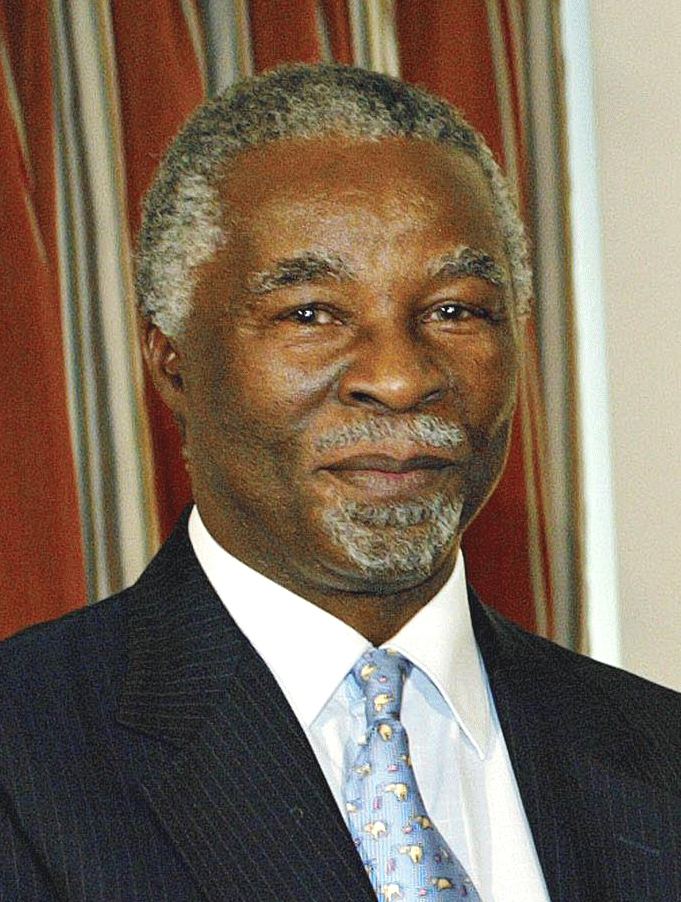
Candidate	Thabo Mbeki
Delegate vote	Unopposed
President before election
Nelson Mandela
Elected President
Thabo Mbeki

The 50th National Conference of the African National Congress (ANC) took place from 16 to 20 December 1997 at the University of the North West in what was then called Mafikeng. Attended by 3,000 voting delegates, the conference elected a successor to outgoing ANC President Nelson Mandela, who declined to stand for another term. Thabo Mbeki was elected unopposed, and Jacob Zuma was elected unopposed as his deputy; they were later elected President and Deputy President of the country in the 1999 general elections, in which the ANC won 66.35% of the vote, up from 62.65% in 1994.

Although the conference entirely changed the composition of the party's top leadership, with Mbeki and Zuma the only residuum of the so-called "Top Six" as elected in 1994, most candidates were elected unopposed, and there was relatively little appearance of friction from any wing of the party. On some accounts, this was because the top leadership prepared assiduously for the conference, advocating unity and continuity, lobbying for a slate of preferred candidates, and negotiating compromises with potential dissidents. However, two of the top positions – National Chairperson and Deputy Secretary General – were contested, and neither went to the Mbeki-allied candidate. The conference also elected the 60-member National Executive Committee (NEC) without any significant upsets. Significant resolutions of the conference endorsed cadre deployment; endorsed the controversial Growth, Employment and Redistribution policy; and changed the ANC constitution to reduce the frequency of the national conferences and to centralise the election process for parliamentary candidates.

== Resignation of Nelson Mandela ==
The time has come to hand over the baton in a relay that started more than 85 years ago in Mangaung... [H]ere are the reins of the movement – protect and guard its precious legacy; defend its unity and integrity as committed disciples of change; pursue its popular objectives like true revolutionaries who seek only to serve the nation.

– Nelson Mandela's closing address to the 50th Conference

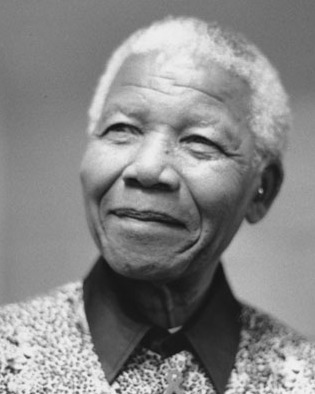
Outgoing ANC President Nelson Mandela

President Nelson Mandela, the outgoing president of the African National Congress (ANC), had, since February 1995 or earlier, made it clear publicly that he intended to retire after the 1999 general elections. The 50th National Conference thus centred around electing his successor as ANC President, who would become the ANC's presidential candidate in the national elections and therefore would likely become the next President of the country.

Mandela's political report to the conference, delivered on 16 December, took over four hours to deliver, and included strongly-worded rhetoric decrying resistance to social change. Mandela harshly criticised those who acted as "the anti-democratic forces of counter revolution," including foreign-funded non-governmental organisations, "various elements of the former ruling group," and "the bulk of the mass media." He said that, since the ANC's 49th National Conference during the fall of apartheid, there had been a "counter-offensive which would seek to maintain the privileges of the white minority," and that white-led political parties had "essentially decided against the pursuit of a national agenda" and in favour of "a reactionary, dangerous and opportunist position."

During the closing session, newly elected ANC President Thabo Mbeki used his speeches to the plenary to deliver tributes to Mandela. Mandela likewise honoured the ANC's former leaders in his final address.

== Leadership election ==
=== President ===
Mbeki, who had been Mandela's deputy in the party and in the government since 1994, was widely understood within the ANC to be the candidate whom Mandela and other top leaders intended to become the next ANC President. In July 1996, Mandela said that Mbeki was "very talented and very popular and if the organisation elected him, I would feel that they have made the correct decision." In a televised interview on 14 December 1997, two days before the conference, he said:

...Thabo Mbeki is already a de facto President of the country. I am pushing everything to him and I’m a ceremonial president. They can ask me any day to hand over all powers to Thabo Mbeki – he is the man who is already running the government of the country. And my stepping down will be very smooth, it won’t bring about any disruption.

It was indeed the case that he had increasingly delegated authority to Mbeki in recent years, and he was seen as the most likely successor to Mandela as early as February 1995. There remained persistent rumours that Mandela's preferred successor was former trade unionist and ANC Secretary General Cyril Ramaphosa, who had resigned from politics the previous year to pursue a career in business, but Mbeki was elected unopposed.

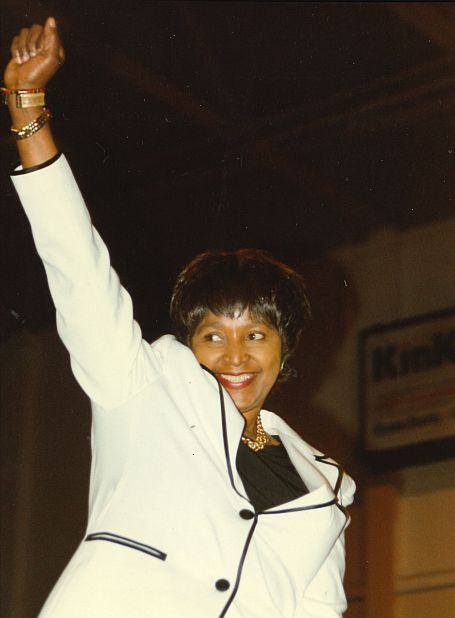
Winnie Madikizela-Mandela in 1996

=== Deputy President ===
In September, the ANC Women's League announced that it would nominate its president, Winnie Madikizela-Mandela, for the ANC deputy presidency. Senior elements of the Eastern Cape province also reportedly supported Madikizela-Mandela. However, following her controversial appearances at the Truth and Reconciliation Commission, the Women's League nomination was invalidated on a technicality, and she received no nominations ahead of the conference. On the second day of the conference, she was nominated from the floor. According to the ANC constitution, a nomination from the floor stood only if it was seconded by at least 25 per cent of delegates (recently increased from 10 per cent). Madikizela-Mandela's nomination reportedly received support from only 125 delegates or fewer, far short of the threshold, but, before a tally could be announced, she conferred with the NEC and then announced from the podium, to applause, that she would decline the nomination. Peter Mokaba said that she had long planned not to stand for election, while others, including outgoing acting Secretary General Cheryl Carolus, said that she had not made the decision until the seconders were being counted. Outgoing National Chairperson Jacob Zuma was ultimately elected unopposed as deputy president. Both Lindiwe Sisulu and Julius Malema have since criticised the ANC for elevating Zuma over Madikizela-Mandela at Mafikeng, with Malema implying that senior leadership had expressly excluded Madikizela-Mandela from the competition.

=== National Chairperson ===
Although it was understood that senior leadership backed Minister of Sport and Recreation Steve Tshwete, an ally of Mbeki's, for the party chairmanship, the branches nominated two other candidates: Mathews Phosa, Premier of Mpumalanga, and Terror Lekota, Chairperson of the National Council of Provinces. Phosa declined the nomination, leaving a two-horse race between Tshwete and Lekota, who were known to be on poor terms. Lekota had the support of six of the nine provincial branches, as well as the Congress of South African Trade Unions (COSATU) and the South African Communist Party (SACP). Tshwete had the support of the other three provinces, the ANC Youth League, and, at least initially, the Women's League – after the nominations phase, Tshwete was involved in a public dispute with Madikizela-Mandela, the Women's League President, over government service delivery. At the conference, Lekota won the vote by an overwhelming margin.

=== Other positions ===
The only other Top Six position voted on was that of Deputy Secretary General. The Mbeki-allied candidate was Mavivi Myakayaka-Manzini, but Thejiwe Mtintso, with the support of COSATU, ultimately narrowly won the election. COSATU also supported Pravin Gordhan for the Treasurer General post, but he did not run.

=== Results ===
The results of the leadership elections were as follows (victorious candidates in bold):

Position	Candidate	Votes	%
President	**Thabo Mbeki**	Unopposed	
Deputy President	**Jacob Zuma**	Unopposed	
National Chairperson	**Terror Lekota**	**1,775**	**67.39%**
National Chairperson	Steve Tshwete	859	32.61%
Secretary General	**Kgalema Motlanthe**	Unopposed	
Deputy Secretary General	**Thenjiwe Mtintso**	**1,398**	**54.40%**
Deputy Secretary General	Mavivi Manzini	1,172	45.60%
Treasurer General	**Mendi Msimang**	Unopposed	

== Election of the National Executive Committee ==
The conference also elected the sixty additional members of the NEC, from a list of 131 candidates. The following ten candidates received the most votes:

1. Cyril Ramaphosa (2,390 votes)
2. Kader Asmal (2,324 votes)
3. Pallo Jordan (2,304 votes)
4. Mac Maharaj (2,260 votes)
5. Jay Naidoo (2,243 votes)
6. Tito Mboweni (2,242 votes)
7. Trevor Manuel (2,240 votes)
8. Dullah Omar (2,166 votes)
9. Valli Moosa (2,162 votes)
10. Ronnie Kasrils (2,150 votes)

Ebrahim Ebrahim, Thandi Modise, and Stella Sigcau failed to gain re-election to the NEC – Sigcau was the only cabinet minister not to be elected – but all three were co-opted onto the committee soon after the conference in February 1998.

== Resolutions ==
The 50th National Conference marked the inauguration of a formal ANC policy of cadre deployment in the public service. The conference resolved that the ANC should pursue a strategy of cadre deployment across "the key centres of power," including by establishing deployment committees at every level of the organisation. This resolution was implemented from 1998, when the national deployment committee was founded under the leadership of Zuma, the newly elected ANC Deputy President. Following allegations of state capture in later years, the cadre deployment policy has become controversial.

The conference also weighed in on the burgeoning controversy around the Growth, Employment and Redistribution policy (GEAR), a neoliberal macroeconomic policy introduced in 1997, and its implications for the ANC's flagship Reconstruction and Development Programme (RDP). The conference endorsed GEAR as a central part of the ANC's economic and social framework, and resolved that GEAR did not supplant the RDP but rather "aimed at giving effect to the realisation of the RDP." Despite dogged criticism of GEAR in the past from within the party and its Tripartite Alliance partners, the resolution was adopted unanimously after fifteen minutes discussion, possibly because the leadership had engaged extensively with critics prior to the conference.

Finally, the conference made modifications to the ANC constitution which are viewed as having consolidated executive power within the organisation. The constitution was changed such that national conferences would be held only every five years, instead of every three years, with national general councils introduced as the mid-term national meeting of the ANC. This extended the term of the Top Six and NEC commensurately. The constitution was also changed to establish a "national list committee," composed of between five and nine members chosen by the NEC, which would control the election of parliamentary candidates.
