= Buti Manamela =

South African politician (born 1979)

The Honourable Buti Manamela MP
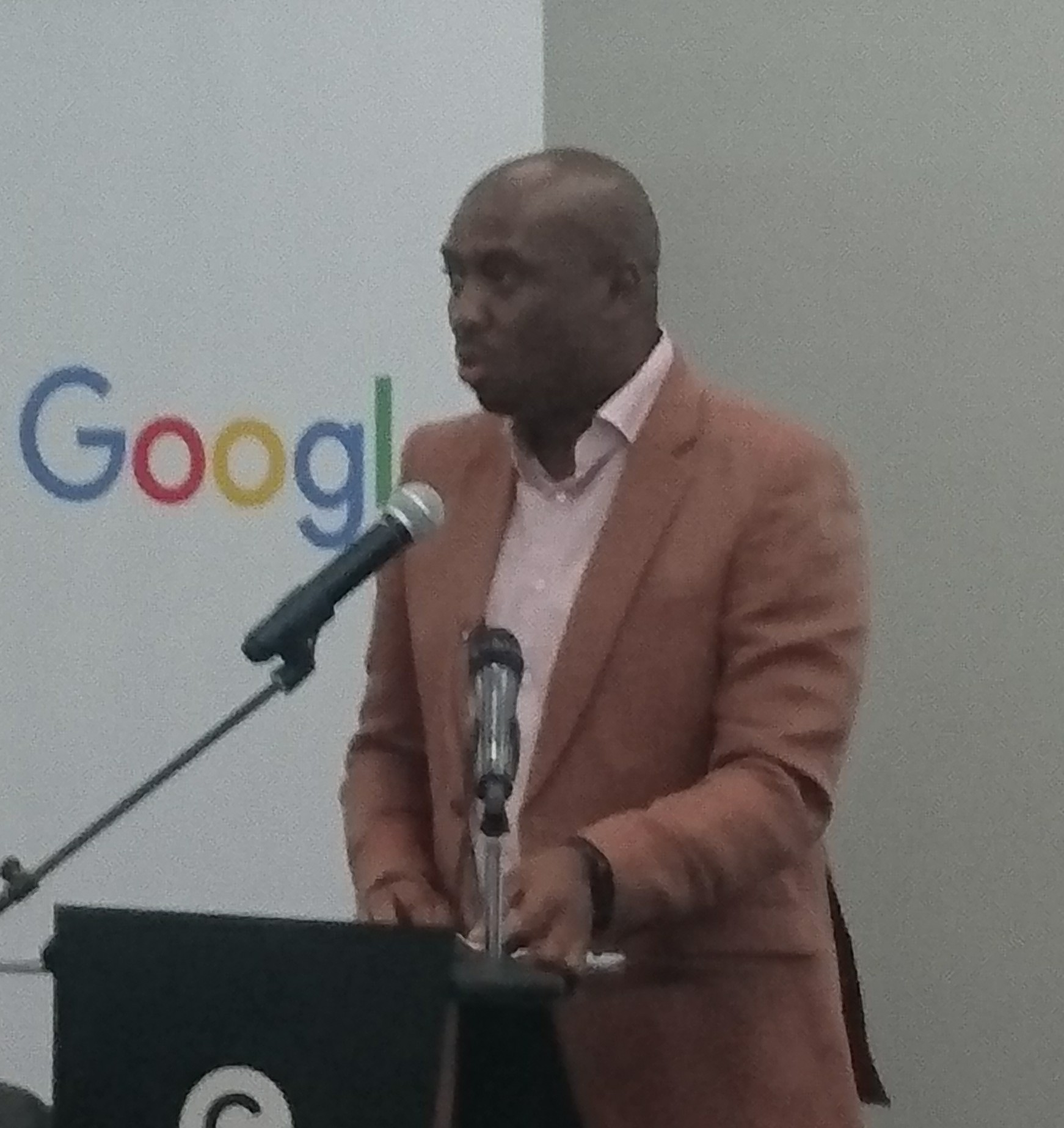
- Manamela in July 2017

Minister of Higher Education and Training
- Incumbent
- Assumed office 21 July 2025
- President: Cyril Ramaphosa
- Deputy: Yusuf Cassim
- Preceded by: Nobuhle Nkabane

Deputy Minister of Higher Education, Science and Technology
- In office 29 May 2019 – 21 July 2025
- President: Cyril Ramaphosa
- Minister: Blade Nzimande
- Preceded by: Himself (for Higher Education); Zanele kaMagwaza-Msibi (for Science and Technology)
- Succeeded by: Nomusa Dube-Ncube

Deputy Minister of Higher Education and Training
- In office 17 October 2017 – 7 May 2019
- President: Jacob Zuma; Cyril Ramaphosa
- Minister: Hlengiwe Mkhize; Naledi Pandor
- Preceded by: Mduduzi Manana
- Succeeded by: Himself (for Higher Education, Science and Technology)

Deputy Minister in the Presidency
- In office 26 May 2014 – 17 October 2017
- President: Jacob Zuma
- Minister: Jeff Radebe
- Preceded by: Obed Bapela

Member of the National Assembly
- Incumbent
- Assumed office 6 May 2009

National Secretary of the Young Communist League of South Africa
- In office December 2003 – December 2014
- Chairperson: David Masondo; Yershen Pillay
- Preceded by: League re-established
- Succeeded by: Mluleki Dlelanga

Personal details
- Born: Buti Kgwaridi Manamela; 10 July 1979 (age 47) Phagameng, Transvaal; South Africa
- Party: African National Congress
- Other political affiliations: South African Communist Party
- Spouse: Nomvuyo Mhlakaza-Manamela
- Education: Witwatersrand University

Buti Kgwaridi Manamela (born 10 July 1979) is a South African politician who is currently serving as the Minister of Higher Education, Science and Technology since 21 July 2025 having served as Deputy Minister of Higher Education, Science and Technology since October 2017. He was formerly the Deputy Minister in the Presidency from 2014 to 2017, and he has represented the African National Congress (ANC) in the National Assembly since May 2009.

Born in Limpopo, Manamela rose to prominence as a youth activist, notably as national secretary of the Young Communist League of the South African Communist Party (SACP) from December 2003 to December 2014. In this capacity, he was a champion of Jacob Zuma's presidential ambitions. He was elected to the National Assembly in the 2009 general election, and Zuma appointed him as Deputy Minister in the Presidency after the 2014 general election. His next office was as Deputy Minister of Higher Education and Training, a portfolio that was restructured as Higher Education, Science and Technology in the cabinet of President Cyril Ramaphosa.

In December 2022, Manamela was elected to a five-year term as a member of the ANC National Executive Committee. He has been an elected member of the SACP Central Committee since July 2012.

== Early life and education ==
Manamela was born on 10 July 1979 in Phagameng, a township in Modimolle in the former Northern Transvaal (present-day Limpopo Province). He attended Phagameng High School, where he was president of the student representative council. In addition, he joined the Congress of South African Students (COSAS) and African National Congress (ANC) Youth League as a teenager in 1993; he was a branch secretary for the local ANC Youth League from 1994 to 1996 and a branch coordinator for COSAS in 1995.

After matriculating in 1997, Manamela studied towards an electronic engineering diploma at Mamelodi College (now Tshwane North College) in Pretoria. While there, he was president of the student representative council from 1998 to 1999. He was also active in the South African Students Congress (SASCO); he served as SASCO provincial chairperson and, in 2000, as national deputy president. Leaving college in 2001, Manamela was an organiser for the South African Commercial, Catering and Allied Workers' Union from 2001 to 2003. Later, in 2017, he completed a Master's degree in public policy from the University of the Witwatersrand.

== Young Communist League ==
In December 2003, the South African Communist Party (SACP) relaunched its Young Communist League (YCL) for the post-apartheid era, and Manamela was elected as its inaugural national secretary. He held the post for over a decade, until the end of 2014. In the early years of his leadership, the YCL was a vocal supporter of Jacob Zuma, who became the primary political rival of President Thabo Mbeki. After Mbeki sacked Zuma as Deputy President in June 2005, Manamela, on behalf of the YCL, said that the decision infringed upon Zuma's constitutional rights. He had formerly defended Zuma against corruption allegations, and the YCL later supported Zuma during his rape trial.

In June 2008, the YCL condemned the "imperialist inclination" of British authorities after Manamela was detained at Heathrow Airport for several hours, according to the YCL under "barbaric interrogation... on suspicion that he is a terrorist". Manamela was on a trip to London to meet with the British Young Communist League and attend a lecture at the School of Oriental and African Studies, and he said that he was held by immigration officers for about six hours. The British High Commission said that he was subject to "routine immigration checks".

== National Assembly: 2009–2014 ==
In the 2009 general election, Manamela was elected to represent the ANC in the National Assembly. From 2011 he was the ANC's whip in the Portfolio Committee on Labour, and he was also the volunteer-in-chief ahead of Mandela Day. During this period, he was one of the Mail & Guardian's 200 Young South Africans in 2009 and 2010.

Also during his first term in the National Assembly, Manamela was elected to a third term as YCL secretary at a hotly contested national congress in Mafikeng. His outgoing deputy, Khaye Nkwanyane, was slated to challenge his incumbency, but Manamela's camp reportedly reached a deal with Nkwanyane that left him uncontested. One of the issues of contestation was Manamela's close relationship with SACP general secretary Blade Nzimande: by that time, Nzimande was viewed as Manamela's political "mentor", and critics even characterised Manamela as his "puppet", though Manamela denied this. Manamela was directly elected onto the SACP's Central Committee in 2012, though he had long been an ex officio member of the committee in his YCL capacity. In 2014, he was additionally elected to the Provincial Executive Committee on the ANC's Limpopo branch.

== Deputy Minister in the Presidency: 2014–2017 ==
In the May 2014 general election, Manamela was re-elected to the National Assembly, ranked 28th on the ANC's national party list. After the election, Zuma, now President of South Africa, appointed Manamela as Deputy Minister in the Presidency under his second-term cabinet. Deputising Minister Jeff Radebe, he was responsible for a newly enlarged portfolio, which included the National Planning Commission and youth development functions as well as the Department of Planning, Monitoring and Evaluation.

Ahead of the YCL's fourth national congress in December 2014, Manamela announced that he would not seek election to another term as general secretary but would instead step down to allow new leaders to emerge. However, he served the rest of his term as a member of the SACP Central Committee and was re-elected to that body at the party's 14th national congress in July 2017. His re-election followed reports that Zuma's opponents were lobbying for Manamela and other Zuma allies to be ousted from the Central Committee; according to sources of the Mail & Guardian, Manamela had fallen out with Nzimande over issues including Manamela's continued support for Zuma.

== Minister of Higher Education ==
On 17 October 2017, Zuma announced a cabinet reshuffle in which Manamela was appointed as Deputy Minister of Higher Education and Training, serving under Hlengiwe Mkhize. He remained in that portfolio after Cyril Ramaphosa replaced Zuma in the presidency. Under Ramaphosa's second cabinet, appointed after the 2019 general election, the ministry was enlarged as the Ministry of Higher Education, Science and Technology, and Nzimande was appointed as the minister above Manamela.

In addition, at the ANC's 55th National Conference in December 2022, Manamela was elected to a five-year term as a member of the ANC National Executive Committee; he was ranked 22nd of the committee's 80 members, receiving 1,503 votes across roughly 4,000 ballots. He was also re-elected to the SACP Central Committee in 2022 and was appointed as the party's assistant secretary for internal media and publications. Buti Manamela has been appointed as Minister of higher education after Nobuhle Nkabane's resignation.

== Personal life ==
He is married to politician Vuyo Mhlakaza, with whom he has two children. He ran the Comrades Marathon in 2018.
