= Matla Power Station =

Power station in Mpumalanga, South Africa

- Location of Matla Power Station in South Africa
- Country: South Africa
- Location: Mpumalanga
- Coordinates: 26°16′57″S 29°8′27″E
- Commission date: 1983
- Owner: Eskom
- Operator: Eskom

Thermal power station
- Primary fuel: Coal

Power generation
- Units operational: 6
- Nameplate capacity: 3,600 Megawatt

Matla Power Station in Mpumalanga, South Africa, is a coal-fired power plant operated by Eskom and consuming the output from the Matla coal mine.

== History ==
Construction started in 1974, and the last unit was commissioned in July 1983. In 1981, the southernmost smokestack measuring 276 metres (906 ft) in height was demolished after it partially collapsed during construction, killing 4 workers. It held the world record for the tallest free standing structure to be explosively demolished for 24 years until the 2006 demolition of the 300 metres (980 ft) Westerholt Power Station chimney.

The actual explosion was also used in a gag in Jamie Uys' Funny People 2, where an electrician is instructed to do some wiring and is warned that improper connection will cause the stack to explode.

== See also ==
- Eskom
- Fossil-fuel power plant
- List of power stations in South Africa
