= Solly Phetoe =

South African trade unionist

Solly Phetoe is a South African trade union leader.

Phetoe was born in Broederstroom and grew up in Skeerport. He studied at the Eden College of Braamfontein, where he became involved in anti-apartheid activism. In 1982, he became a machine operator at the Firestone Tire and Rubber Company, where he joined the Metal and Allied Workers' Union. This became part of the National Union of Metalworkers of South Africa (NUMSA). Phetoe became a shop steward, and later worked full-time covering the tyre industry for the union.

In 2000, Phetoe became a provincial organiser for the South African Democratic Teachers Union, then in 2003 became the North West provincial organiser for the Congress of South African Trade Unions (COSATU). He served in this post until 2015, when he was elected as the federation's deputy general secretary, defeating Oscar Phaka. In the role he took the lead on enforcing occupational health and safety agreements. In 2022, he was elected as general secretary of the federation.
