= George Mashamba =

South African politician (born 1944)

Provincial Chairperson of the African National Congress in Limpopo
- In office 1996–1998
- Premier: Stan Mathabatha
- Deputy: Joe Phaahla
- Secretary: Collins Chabane
- Preceded by: Ngoako Ramatlhodi
- Succeeded by: Ngoako Ramatlhodi

Personal details
- Born: 1944 (age 81–82)
- Citizenship: South Africa
- Party: African National Congress
- Other political affiliations: South African Communist Party
- Spouse: Joyce Mashamba
- Education: University of the North

Tintswalo Godwin George Mashamba (born 1944) is a South African politician and intellectual who represented the African National Congress (ANC) in the South African Senate and Limpopo Provincial Legislature until 2014. After his retirement from legislative politics, he served from 2018 to 2023 as the Chairperson of the ANC's internal Integrity Commission.

During apartheid, Mashamba and his wife, Joyce, were underground operatives for the ANC in the Northern Transvaal. He was imprisoned from 1977 to 1987 for his ANC activities and spent five years on Robben Island. He was elected to the first democratically elected Senate in 1994. He also served as Provincial Chairperson of the ANC in Limpopo from 1996 to 1998 and is a former member of the Central Committee of the South African Communist Party.

== Early activism and imprisonment ==
Mashamba was born in 1944. He was recruited into the African National Congress (ANC) in 1974, at which time the organisation was banned by the apartheid government and operated underground. He and his wife were recruited during a meeting in Swaziland with the leaders of the ANC's Swaziland unit, including Jacob Zuma and Thabo Mbeki, who persuaded the Mashambas to set up an underground ANC cell at the University of the North, where Mashamba was a philosophy lecturer and Master's student.

In 1976 the Mashambas were arrested, along with S'bu Ndebele (then an ANC operative in Swaziland) and Percy Tshabalala, and were charged with "furthering the aims and objectives" of the ANC. Mashamba and the others pled not guilty in the Rand Supreme Court. During the trial, which lasted from October 1976 to February 1977, several state's witnesses testified that the Mashambas had attempted to recruit them into the ANC for political education and military training and had attempted to distribute ANC propaganda publications.

In February 1977, Mashamba and Ndebele were sentenced to ten years' imprisonment on Robben Island, although they were transferred to Johannesburg Prison after five years. Mashamba's wife also served five years in a women's prison, and their three young children, all under the age of six, were raised by family during that time. Mashamba was imprisoned alongside Nelson Mandela and a large contingent of other ANC members, who maintained a party organisation inside the prison; Mashamba was apparently expelled from the party for a year during his prison sentence because he openly disagreed with the leadership on some issue. He was released in 1987.

== Post-apartheid political career ==
=== ANC Provincial Chairperson ===
In South Africa's first democratic elections in 1994, Mashamba was elected to represent the ANC in the Senate, the upper house of the new Constitutional Assembly. He also served, from 1996 to 1998, as Provincial Chairperson of the ANC's branch in the newly constituted Limpopo Province. His election to that office was highly controversial in the ANC. The ANC National Executive Committee (NEC) had apparently preferred that the incumbent, Ngoako Ramatlhodi, should be re-elected unopposed, leading to an implicit or explicit instruction that members should not contest the position. The frontrunners, Peter Mokaba and Joe Phaahla, therefore declined their nominations for the chairmanship, reportedly following a conversation with ANC President Nelson Mandela about the imperatives of party unity. However, at the last minute, Mashamba was nominated to stand against Ramatlhodi and accepted – "for the sake of party unity", he said.

He narrowly won the election, receiving 352 votes against Ramatlhodi's 350 – often viewed as "vote[s] against NEC interference in provincial affairs". During his term as Provincial Chairperson, he was deputised by Phaahla; Collins Chabane, who was rumoured to have encouraged him to stand against Ramatlhodi, served as Provincial Secretary. At the next provincial elective conference in 1998, Ramatlhodi was returned to the chairmanship.

=== Provincial legislature ===
In later years, and alongside his wife, Mashamba represented the ANC in the Limpopo Provincial Legislature. He was elected to his final term in the legislature in the 2009 general election, ranked seventh on the ANC's provincial party list (immediately behind his wife), and he chaired the legislature's committee on agriculture during the legislative term that followed. He did not seek re-election in the 2014 general election.

== ANC Integrity Commission ==
Though he retired from legislative politics in 2014, Mashamba remained a member of the Central Committee of the SACP until 2017. The following year, in July 2018, the ANC announced that Mashamba would succeed Andrew Mlangeni as chairperson of the party's internal Integrity Commission, which was established to investigate and make disciplinary recommendations in respect of allegations of misconduct, especially corruption, by party members. Mashamba was deputised by former Justice Minister Brigitte Mabandla; also serving on the nine-member committee during his tenure were Mlangeni, Sophie de Bruyn‚ Sindiso Mfenyana‚ Sue Rabkin‚ Smangaliso Mkhatshwa‚ Essop Jassat and Cyril Jantjies. Mashamba's leadership of the committee coincided with controversy within the party about the proper scope and powers of the committee, especially in the aftermath of the Zondo Commission's findings about misconduct by ANC members. His five-year term ended after the ANC's 55th National Conference and in February 2023 the party announced that he would be succeeded as chairperson by Frank Chikane.

== Personal life ==
He married Joyce Mashamba in September 1969. At the time of her death in June 2018, they had three sons, one daughter, and seven grandchildren. In 2019, he installed his own tombstone next to hers in Mulamula, her home village in Malamulele, Limpopo.
