= Ellen Tshabalala =

South African broadcasting executive

Zandile Ellen Tshabalala
- Known for: South African Broadcasting Corporation
- Title: Former Chairperson of South African Broadcasting Corporation

Zandile Ellen Tshabalala also known as Ellen Tshabalala is a former Chairperson of the South African Broadcasting Corporation (SABC). She was appointed Chairperson of the Board in September 2013, having previously served for six months prior as acting SABC Chairperson. She resigned on Wednesday, 17 December 2014.She died on 03 July 2022.

In July 2014, it emerged that she allegedly lied on her CV when she applied for the post of Chairperson of the SABC.

The CV she put before the parliamentary portfolio committee on communications, under which the SABC falls, said she graduated from the University of South Africa (UNISA) with a BCom and a postgraduate diploma in labour relations. This claim was repeated in a statement by the presidency of South Africa, Jacob Zuma, announcing her appointment. However, according to a Promotion of Access to Information Act application sent by the newspaper City Press, UNISA said Tshabalala had neither of the qualifications that she claimed. UNISA's executive director of legal services and information, Jan van Wyk wrote in a letter to the newspaper City Press: "According to our records, no qualification was awarded to the mentioned individual."

According to Jan van Wyk, she registered for a BCom degree in 1988 and again in 1996 but had failed to complete the course. She had also registered for a diploma in labour relations in 1995. In 2011, Mercedes Benz had requested confirmation of her qualifications from UNISA when she applied for a job there. The university had informed an intermediary of her failure to attain the qualifications she claimed.

Parliaments Portfolio Committee on Communications inquiry that began on 3 December 2014 into her qualifications found her guilty on two charges. She was found guilty of misconduct for lying to Parliament about her qualifications. She was further found guilty of lying in a sworn affidavit she submitted to Parliament in lieu of her academic records. She had claimed to have lost her qualification certificates when she had been burgled.

She had initially refused to resign, claiming that there was a political agenda behind her guilty verdict. She further claimed that "elements within the alliance (Tripartite Alliance)" were hell bent to purge and vilify her. "I am not willing to resign because I did nothing wrong."

Though there was no clear indication that the ANC played a role in her resignation, the National Executive Committee (African National Congress) took a decision to urge her to stop fighting and resign.

At the time of the controversy, she was working on the following boards:

- The President’s Advisory Council on Broad-Based BEE
- Sishen Iron Ore Company
- Transnet Limited – SOC
- Transnet Foundation
- Cape Empowerment Limited
- Ascension Properties
- Port Shepstone Harbour Development Company
- Moral Regeneration Movement.
