= Mugwena Maluleke =

South African trade union leader

Mugwena Maluleke (born 1963) is a South African trade union leader.

Born on a farm in Mookgopong, Maluleke worked in the tobacco fields as a child. He qualified as an English and maths teacher in 1985, and began working in Tshwane. He became involved in the anti-apartheid campaign, and joined the South African Democratic Teachers Union (SADTU). In 1993, he took part in a strike, which led to his vicitimisation by the government.

Maluleke later became headteacher at Rodney Mokoena Secondary School in Soshanguve. He was elected as secretary of SADTU's Soshanguve branch, then became its deputy secretary for Gauteng. He next became a full-time negotiator for the union, then served for ten years as its national treasurer. In 2009, he was elected as the general secretary of SADTU. In 2024, he was additionally elected as president of Education International.

Maluleke has seven children, and has a master's degree in business administration.

Trade union offices
Preceded by Thulas Nxesi	General Secretary of the South African Democratic Teachers Union; 2009–present	Succeeded by Incumbent
Preceded by Susan Hopgood	President of Education International; 2024–present	Succeeded by Incumbent
