= James Motlatsi =

James Motlatsi (born 5 June 1951) is a Mosotho mining executive and former trade union leader, who has been active in South Africa.

Born in Mohale's Hoek in Lesotho, Motlatsi became a labourer at the Welkom gold mine in 1970. He was gradually promoted, becoming a driller, then a team leader, and eventually working as a personnel assistant. In 1981, the Council of Unions of South Africa resolved to establish a mining union, and Motlatsi met Cyril Ramaphosa, who was its main organiser. Motlatsi was enthusiastic, and immediately began recruiting members at the mine. When the National Union of Mineworkers (NUM) was officially founded, in 1982, he was elected as its first president.

The NUM grew rapidly, to become the largest union in South Africa, and moved to affiliate to the Congress of South African Trade Unions. He was fired from his mining job during a 1987 strike, and thereafter worked full-time for the union. In 1990, he and Ramaphosa were both arrested for leading a march during another strike. He stood down from his trade union post in 2000, to work for AngloGold Ashanti. In 2005, he purchased 75% of Teba, becoming its executive chair, the remainder of the company being given to its employees.

Motlatsi has been awarded the Order of Ramatseatsana, served on the council of the University of the Witwatersrand, and was a founder of the Adopt-A-School Foundation and the Vaal Reefs Disaster Fund.

Trade union offices
Preceded by New position	President of the National Union of Mineworkers; 1982–2000	Succeeded by Senzeni Zokwana
