= Nonhlanhla Khoza =

South African politician

KwaZulu-Natal MEC for Social Development
- In office 27 May 2019 – 14 June 2024
- Premier: Nomusa Dube-Ncube; Sihle Zikalala
- Preceded by: Weziwe Thusi
- Succeeded by: Mbali Shinga

Member of the KwaZulu-Natal Legislature
- In office 21 May 2014 – 28 May 2024

Personal details
- Born: Nonhlanhla Mildred Khoza
- Party: African National Congress
- Profession: Politician

Nonhlanhla Mildred Khoza is a South African politician in KwaZulu-Natal who served as the Member of the Executive Council (MEC) for the provincial Department of Social Development from May 2019 until May 2024. Khoza was a member of the KwaZulu-Natal Legislature from May 2014 until May 2024. She is the current provincial chairperson of the African National Congress Women's League.

== Career in the ANC ==
Khoza was elected a regional secretary of the African National Congress Women's League in 2001, a position she would hold for two terms when she was elected regional chairperson. In 2008, Khoza was elected provincial secretary of the women's league in KwaZulu-Natal. After two terms in the position, she was elected provincial chairperson, a position she currently holds.

In 2017, Khoza supported Nkosazana Dlamini-Zuma's unsuccessful campaign for ANC national president at the party's 54th National Conference.

At the ANCWL provincial conference held in August 2023, Khoza defeated the MEC for Co-operative Governance and Traditional Affairs Bongi Sithole-Moloi by three votes to secure another term as provincial chairperson.

== Provincial government: 2014-2024 ==
Khoza became a member of the KwaZulu-Natal Legislature on 21 May 2014 following the 2014 provincial election. After the 2019 provincial election, Zikalala was elected premier. On 27 May 2019, he appointed Khoza as the Member of the Executive Council responsible for the provincial Department of Social Development, succeeding Weziwe Thusi. She was sworn in on the same day.

On 11 August 2022, Khoza was reappointed as Social Development MEC by the newly elected premier Nomusa Dube-Ncube. Khoza left the provincial legislature and the provincial government in 2024.
