= Koliswa Fihlani =

South African politician

Koliswa Fihlani MPL

Member of the Eastern Cape Provincial Legislature
- Incumbent
- Assumed office 2009 or earlier

Personal details
- Citizenship: South Africa
- Party: African National Congress

Koliswa or Kholiswa Fihlani is a South African politician who has represented the African National Congress (ANC) in the Eastern Cape Provincial Legislature for over a decade. She has served as Deputy Chief Whip of the Majority Party in the legislature since 2019.

She was elected to the provincial legislature in the 2009 general election, ranked 38th on the ANC's provincial party list, and in the 2014 general election, ranked tenth. In the 2019 general election, she was ranked 13th on the party list and was appointed as Deputy Chief Whip during the legislature's first sitting; she deputised Loyiso Magqashela.
