= Solly Mapaila =

South African politician

14th General Secretary of the South African Communist Party
- Incumbent
- Assumed office 15 July 2022
- First Deputy: Madala Masuku
- Second Deputy: David Masondo
- Preceded by: Blade Nzimande

First Deputy General Secretary of the South African Communist Party
- In office July 2017 – July 2022
- General Secretary: Blade Nzimande
- Preceded by: Jeremy Cronin
- Succeeded by: Madala Masuku

Second Deputy General Secretary of the South African Communist Party
- In office July 2012 – July 2017
- General Secretary: Blade Nzimande
- Preceded by: Jeremy Cronin
- Succeeded by: Chris Matlhako

Personal details
- Party: South African Communist Party
- Other political affiliations: African National Congress (Tripartite Alliance)

Solly Afrika Mapaila is a South African politician who is the General Secretary of the South African Communist Party. He was elected unopposed on 15 July 2022 in his current position at the SACP National Congress. Mapaila was appointed as the Second Deputy General Secretary of the South African Communist Party in 2012.

== Career ==
Mapaila was a member of Umkhonto weSizwe and operated outside of South Africa prior to 1994. On returning to South Africa in 1994, he was integrated into the South African Defence Force and stationed at Thaba Tshwane.

He is a critic of corruption in the African National Congress and the South African government, and of the leadership of former South African president, Jacob Zuma. A group of Zuma supporters threatened to open criminal charges against him if he continued to say that the president is corrupt.

Mapaila directly questioned the purported intelligence report titled "Operation Checkmate" used by President Jacob Zuma to fire the former Minister of Finance Pravin Gordhan. He led calls from within the Tripartite Alliance for the resignation of President Jacob Zuma.

Mapaila was considered a leading candidate to succeed Blade Nzimande as general secretary of the SACP for a number of years and was ultimately elected to this position in 2022.
