= Matla coal mine =

Coal mine in Mpumalanga, South Africa

Matla Coal Mine
- Location: Mpumalanga, South Africa
- Products: Coking coal

The Matla Coal Mine is a coal mine located in the Mpumalanga Province, South Africa. The mine has coal reserves amounting to 297.3 million tonnes of coking coal, one of the largest coal reserves in Africa and the world. The mine produces around 14 million tonnes of coal per year with the output going directly to the Matla Power Station.
