= Minister of Higher Education (South Africa) =

South African minister

South Africa Minister of Higher Education
- Flag of South Africa

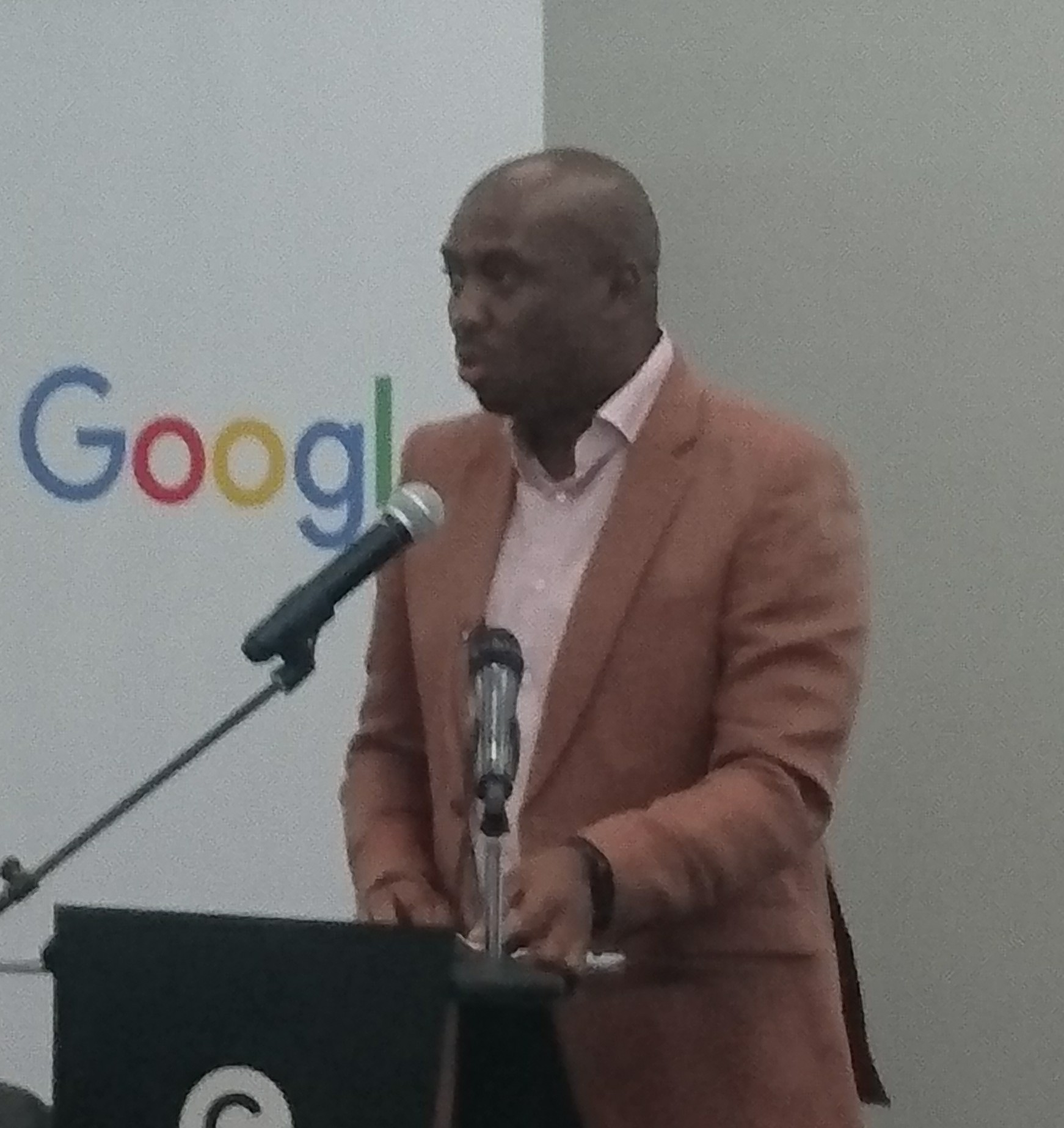
- Incumbent; Buti Manamela since 21 July 2025
- Department of Higher Education and Training
- Style: The Honourable
- Appointer: President of South Africa
- Inaugural holder: Blade Nzimande
- Formation: 11 May 2009
- Deputy: Yusuf Cassim
- Salary: R2,211,937
- Website: Department of Higher Education and Training

The Minister of Higher Education is the minister in the Cabinet of South Africa with responsibility for higher education in South Africa. The post was created as the Minister of Higher Education and Training in May 2009. It was called the Minister of Higher Education, Science and Technology between May 2019 and June 2024.

The role is currently held by African National Congress member Buti Manamela, who was sworn in on 21 July 2025.

The position complements the Minister of Basic Education, who leads the Department of Basic Education, and is therefore responsible for primary and secondary education in South Africa.

== History ==
Before 10 May 2009, higher education was the responsibility of the minister of education. On 10 May 2009, announcing his first cabinet, President Jacob Zuma bifurcated that portfolio, creating the new minister of higher education and training, alongside a minister of basic education.

When President Cyril Ramaphosa announced his second-term cabinet on 29 May 2019, he announced that the Ministry of Science and Technology would be absorbed by the higher education portfolio, creating the enlarged portfolio of the new minister of higher education, Science and Technology.

However, Ramaphosa reversed the merger in his third cabinet, announced on 30 June 2024; henceforth there was an independent minister of science, technology and innovation, while the higher education portfolio was the provenance of the minister of higher education.

== List of ministers with responsibility for higher education ==
Ministry	Minister	Incumbency	Under
Education	Sibusiso Bengu	10 May 1994 – 14 June 1999	Nelson Mandela
Education	Kader Asmal	17 June 1999 – 29 April 2004	Thabo Mbeki
Education	Naledi Pandor	29 April 2004 – 24 September 2008	Thabo Mbeki
Education	Naledi Pandor	25 September 2008 – 9 May 2009	Kgalema Motlanthe
Higher Education and Training	Blade Nzimande	10 May 2009 – 17 October 2017	Jacob Zuma
Higher Education and Training	Hlengiwe Mkhize	17 October 2017 – 26 February 2018	Jacob Zuma
Higher Education and Training	Naledi Pandor	26 February 2018 – 29 May 2019	Cyril Ramaphosa
Higher Education, Science and Technology	Blade Nzimande	29 May 2019 – 19 June 2024	Cyril Ramaphosa
Higher Education	Nobuhle Nkabane	30 June 2024 – 21 July 2025	Cyril Ramaphosa
Higher Education, Science and Technology	Buti Manamela	21 July 2025 - present	Cyril Ramaphosa
