= Blade Nzimande =

South African politician

The Honorable Blade Nzimande MP
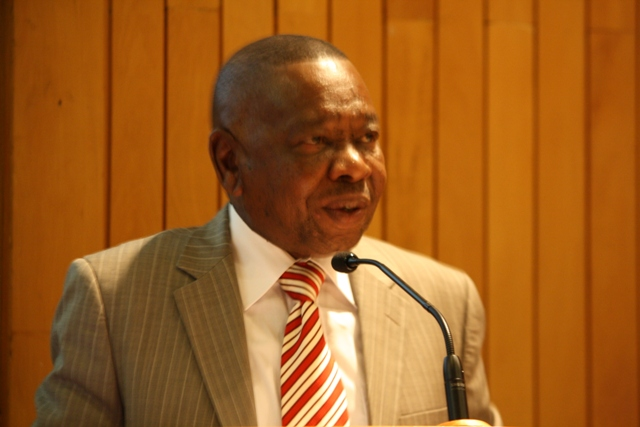

Minister of Science, Technology and Innovation
- Incumbent
- Assumed office 3 July 2024
- President: Cyril Ramaphosa
- Deputy: Nomalungelo Gina
- Preceded by: Himself (for Higher Education, Science and Technology)

9th National Chairperson of the South African Communist Party
- Incumbent
- Assumed office 16 July 2022
- Deputy: Thulas Nxesi
- General Secretary: Solly Afrika Mapaila
- Preceded by: Gwede Mantashe

13th General Secretary of the South African Communist Party
- In office July 1998 – 16 July 2022
- Deputy: Solly Afrika Mapaila; Jeremy Cronin
- Preceded by: Charles Nqakula
- Succeeded by: Solly Afrika Mapaila
Prior cabinet offices 2009–2024
Minister of Higher Education, Science and Technology
In office 30 May 2019 – 30 June 2024
President	Cyril Ramaphosa
Deputy	Buti Manamela
Preceded by	Naledi Pandor (Higher Education); Mmamoloko Kubayi-Ngubane (Science and Technology)
Succeeded by	Nobuhle Nkabane (Higher Education); Himself (Science and Technology)
Minister of Transport
In office 28 February 2018 – 29 May 2019
President	Cyril Ramaphosa
Deputy	Sindy Chikunga
Preceded by	Joe Maswanganyi
Succeeded by	Fikile Mbalula
Acting Minister of Home Affairs
In office 13 November 2018 – 22 November 2018
President	Cyril Ramaphosa
Preceded by	Malusi Gigaba
Succeeded by	Siyabonga Cwele
Minister of Higher Education and Training
In office 11 May 2009 – 17 October 2017
President	Jacob Zuma
Deputy	Mduduzi Manana; Hlengiwe Mkhize
Preceded by	Naledi Pandor
Succeeded by	Hlengiwe Mkhize

Personal details
- Born: Bonginkosi Emmanuel Nzimande; 14 April 1958 (age 67) Edendale, Msunduzi, KwaZulu Natal, South Africa
- Citizenship: South Africa
- Party: South African Communist Party
- Other political affiliations: African National Congress (Tripartite Alliance)
- Spouse: Phumelele Ntombela-Nzimande
- Children: 2
- Education: University of Natal (PhD)
- Occupation: Politician; sociologist; philosopher; educator; anti-apartheid activist

Bonginkosi Emmanuel "Blade" Nzimande (born 14 April 1958 in Edendale near Pietermaritzburg) is a South African politician, sociologist, and former anti-apartheid activist who is currently serving as Minister of Science, Technology and Innovation. A cabinet minister since 2009, Nzimande was the General Secretary of the South African Communist Party from 1998 to 2022.

Nzimande formerly served as the Minister of Higher Education, Science and Technology from 2019 to 2024, as Minister of Transport from 2018 to 2019, and as Minister of Higher Education and Training from 2009 to 2017.

== Education ==
"Blade" Nzimande was one of the three children of Nozipho Alice and Phillip Sphambano, a Tsonga herbalist from Mozambique. He attended the Roman Catholic School, Henryville, and then Plessiers Lower Primary School before going to Mthethomusha School in Edendale, the first school in the area established under the new Bantu education system. He matriculated in 1975 at Georgetown High, Edendale. He completed a Psychology Honours degree at the University of Natal in 1980, a master's degree in Industrial Psychology in 1981, and a PhD from the same university for a thesis titled The corporate guerrillas: class formation and the African corporate petty bourgeoisie in post-1973 South Africa, in the field of Sociology.

In 1976 Nzimande enrolled at the University of Zululand to study for a BA degree in Public Administration and Psychology. He became involved in student activity, including a food boycott and demonstrations against the award of an honorary doctorate to Prince Mangosuthu Buthelezi in May 1976. Nzimande returned to university in 1977 and completed his degree in 1979. After graduating, he returned to Edendale and joined the Azanian Students' Organisation (Azaso) which eventually broke away from the Black Consciousness Movement (BCM), aligning itself with the Congress or Charterist tendency. For Nzimande the shift from BCM to the Chartersist position was facilitated by weekly Zulu broadcasts from Radio Freedom and Radio Moscow. In this way he and his colleagues became acquainted with the policy of the African National Congress (ANC) and they started to receive underground ANC documents. While active in Azaso Nzimande completed his Honours and master's degrees.

== Early career ==
In January 1982 Nzimande moved to Durban, and at that stage was active in the Dambuza Youth Organisation which affiliated to the United Democratic Front (UDF) after its launch in 1983.

In 1982 Nzimande undertook his internship in Industrial Psychology in the personnel department of Tongaat Hulett Sugar Ltd. There he met Jay Naidoo and began working informally with unions, addressing union seminars on job grading and other issues. He resigned his job in 1984.

Nzimande was then offered a post as a lecturer at the Umlazi branch of the University of Zululand where he founded the Department of Industrial Psychology on that campus. At the same time, he became increasingly involved with the trade unions and served on the editorial board of the South African Labour Bulletin in 1986. He also continued to assist with trade unions seminars teaching the history of trade unionism.

In Umlazi he began to work on educational issues in mid-1986 and also held clandestine Marxist study classes with the youth. Nzimande lectured until June 1987 and then joined the University of Natal, Durban to lecture in the Psychology Department. There he became involved in the Culture and Working Life Project, and initiated the cultural activities of the Dumbuzo Cultural Organisation which produced a play on violence, Koze Kube Nini, performed in the townships. He also wrote various articles on violence, and assisted in the presentation of seminars.

== SACP General-Secretary ==
Nzimande criticized the government of Thabo Mbeki and its economic policy, and he was vocal in his support for the removal of Mbeki as President of South Africa. Nzimande began to attack Mbeki's interim successor, President Kgalema Motlanthe, in early January 2009. Saying he was part of the "old Mbeki crowd", senior ANC members loyal to Jacob Zuma called for Nzimande to become second Deputy President, alongside Baleka Mbete. President Motlanthe was also attacked by Nzimande because he fired Vusi Pikoli in 2008, and refused to sign the SABC bill, which would give the ANC full control of state television.

When Zuma took office as president in May 2009, he appointed Nzimande as Minister of Higher Education.

On many occasions, Nzimande criticised the rulings of the judiciary. In 2015 he criticised the ruling that decided that the Economic Freedom Fighters (EFF) could exercise their democratic right to disrupt the parliament.

In June 2017 Nzimande criticised President Zuma, calling his latest Cabinet reshuffle an abuse of power and repeating calls for him to step down. In October 2017, President Zuma, in a cabinet reshuffle, removed Nzimande from his position as the Minister of Higher Education and Training and replaced him with Hlengiwe Mkhize.

On 26 February 2018, President Ramaphosa, in an incoming cabinet reshuffle, reinstated Nzimande as the Minister of Transport.

As minister of education, he spoke out against the protests at universities following the Rhodes Must Fall movement, accusing them of being directed by the EFF and calling them "an anti-ANC government agenda by those who cannot win power through the ballot".

Party political offices
Preceded by Charles Nqakula	General Secretary of the South African Communist Party; 1998–present	Incumbent
