= Tripartite Alliance =

Political alliance in South Africa

- President of the ANC: Cyril Ramaphosa
- General Secretary of the SACP: Solly Afrika Mapaila
- President of the COSATU: Zingiswa Losi
- Founded: 11 February 1990; 36 years ago
- Headquarters: Johannesburg, South Africa
- Ideology: Social democracy; African nationalism; Factions: Labourism; Communism
- Political position: Centre-left; Factions: Centre or left-wing
- Member parties: African National Congress; Congress of South African Trade Unions; South African Communist Party
- National Assembly: 159 / 400

The Tripartite Alliance is an alliance between the African National Congress (ANC), the Congress of South African Trade Unions (COSATU) and the South African Communist Party (SACP). The ANC holds a plurality in the South African parliament. Historically, neither the SACP nor COSATU contested democratic elections in South Africa, until the SACP formally resolved to independently contest the 2026 municipal elections.

The Alliance was forged in 1990 following the release of Nelson Mandela and the unbanning of anti-apartheid political organisations. The movements were opposed to white minority rule by the apartheid government. The Tripartite Alliance is also known as the Revolutionary Alliance or just the Alliance.

== History ==
=== Origins and formation ===
The ideological roots of the alliance date back to the 1920s with close cooperation between the ANC and the Communist Party of South Africa (later the SACP). In the 1950s, this partnership was institutionalized through the Congress Alliance, which also included the South African Congress of Trade Unions (SACTU), the ideological predecessor to COSATU.

The Tripartite Alliance in its current form was formalized in 1990. COSATU, formed in 1985, formally joined the alliance to offer administrative and mass mobilization support to the ANC, with the immediate strategic objective of dismantling apartheid and establishing a non-racial, democratic South Africa. The ANC was recognized as the "leader of the alliance," serving as the sole electoral vehicle for its partners following the introduction of universal suffrage in the 1994 South African general election.

=== Post-apartheid governance and tensions ===
Throughout the post-apartheid era, the alliance served as the governing coalition of South Africa. Members of the SACP and COSATU frequently held dual membership and served as ANC representatives in government and parliament. Despite electoral dominance, ideological tensions became a persistent feature of the relationship. In the late 1990s and 2000s, the SACP and COSATU heavily criticized the ANC government's adoption of the Growth, Employment and Redistribution (GEAR) macroeconomic policy under President Thabo Mbeki, characterizing it as a neoliberal framework contrary to the alliance's working-class aspirations.

=== 2024 GNU and 2026 electoral split ===
Following the 2024 South African general election, the ANC lost its absolute parliamentary majority for the first time since 1994. The party subsequently formed a Government of National Unity (GNU) that included the Democratic Alliance (DA) and other centrist parties. Both the SACP and COSATU staunchly opposed the inclusion of the DA, viewing them as class enemies pursuing an austerity agenda that threatened workers' rights.

In January 2025, the SACP firmly resolved to contest the 2026 municipal elections independently under its own name, despite pleas from President Cyril Ramaphosa to maintain a united front. Ahead of these elections, the SACP promoted the "Conference of the Left", inviting trade unions and anti-capitalist organizations to build a working-class movement. The ANC notably declined to attend in March 2026, stating it did not believe the conference represented the country's "real left".

The ideological rift culminated in October 2026, when COSATU's 15th National Congress abandoned its exclusive endorsement of the ANC. COSATU adopted a "dual support" policy, urging its members to campaign for either the ANC or the SACP in the local government elections, formalizing a historic shift in the alliance's electoral dynamics.

== Constituent parties ==
The Alliance is currently composed of the following political parties:

Party	Abbreviation	Ideology	National Assembly of South Africa	Government
African National Congress	ANC	African nationalism Social democracy	159 / 400	In government
South African Communist Party	SACP	Communism; Marxism–Leninism	0 / 400	In government but not represented in the National Assembly
Congress of South African Trade Unions	COSATU	Trade unionism Labourism	0 / 400	In government but not represented in the National Assembly

== See also ==
- Congress Alliance
