= Fikile Majola =

South African politician (born 1963/64))

The Honourable Fikile Majola MP

Deputy Minister of Trade and Industry
- In office 29 May 2019 – 17 June 2024 Serving with Nomalungelo Gina
- President: Cyril Ramaphosa
- Minister: Ebrahim Patel
- Preceded by: Bulelani Magwanishe
- Succeeded by: Zuko Godlimpi; Andrew Whitfield

Member of the National Assembly
- In office 21 May 2014 – 28 May 2024

Chairperson of the Portfolio Committee on Energy
- In office 20 June 2014 – 7 May 2019
- Speaker: Baleka Mbete
- Preceded by: Sisa Njikelana
- Succeeded by: Portfolio restructured

General Secretary of the National Education, Health and Allied Workers' Union
- In office April 1998 – June 2014
- President: Vusi Nhlapo; Noluthando Sibiya; Mzwandile Makwayiba
- Preceded by: Makgane Thobejane
- Succeeded by: Bereng Soke

Personal details
- Born: Fikile Zachariah Majola; 1963 or 1964 (age 62–63) Orange Free State, South Africa
- Party: African National Congress
- Other political affiliations: Congress of South African Trade Unions; South African Communist Party
- Education: University of the Western Cape
- Nickname: Slovo

Fikile Zachariah "Slovo" Majola (born 1963 or 1964) is a South African politician and former trade unionist who served as the Deputy Minister of Trade and Industry from May 2019 to June 2024. He represented the African National Congress (ANC) in the National Assembly between 2014 and 2024, and before that he was the general secretary of the National Education, Health and Allied Workers' Union (Nehawu) from 1998 to 2014.

Having joined Nehawu in 1989, Majola served six terms as general secretary, presiding over a growth in the union's influence within the Congress of South African Trade Unions (Cosatu) and broader Tripartite Alliance. As an early and prominent political supporter of Jacob Zuma, who became president with Nehawu's support, Majola had a fractious relationship with Cosatu general secretary Zwelinzima Vavi.

Pursuant to the 2014 general election, Majola ended his union career to take up an ANC seat in the National Assembly. He chaired Parliament's Portfolio Committee on Energy during the fifth democratic Parliament from 2014 to 2019, a period in which the committee had a prominent role in oversight of Zuma's controversial Russian nuclear deal. After the 2019 general election, President Cyril Ramaphosa appointed Majola to his deputy ministerial position, which he held throughout the sixth Parliament.

Majola has been a member of the Central Committee of the South African Communist Party since 2007 and currently serves on the party's politburo. He was a member of the ANC National Executive Committee from 2012 to 2017 and a member of Cosatu's Central Executive Committee from 1995 to 2014.

== Early life and education ==
Majola was born in 1963 or 1964 near Kragborn in the former Orange Free State. He has an Honours degree in public administration from the University of the Western Cape.

== Early career and activism ==
He entered politics in the 1980s through the anti-apartheid movement of the former Southern Transvaal; he served in youth organisations, such as the South African Youth Congress, and in the United Democratic Front.

In September 1989, he joined the National Education, Health and Allied Workers' Union (Nehawu), becoming an organiser for the union's local branch in the Vaal. In 1992, he was elected as Nehawu's regional secretary in the Western Transvaal, and the following year he was seconded to Nehawu's national headquarters to work in the secretariat. From there, in 1994, Majola entered the union's national leadership as acting assistant general secretary. Following his formal election to the latter position, he was assistant general secretary from 1995 to 1998.

== General secretary of Nehawu: 1998–2014 ==
At a union congress in Durban in April 1998, Majola was elected as general secretary of Nehawu. He served six terms in the office, gaining re-election in 2001, 2004, 2007, 2010, and 2013. As of 2023, he was the longest-serving general secretary in the union's history, by a considerable margin.

By 2000, the Mail & Guardian, describing Majola as "a respected communist", commended him for having "turned Nehawu from a group of misdirected cannons into a respectable political machine that has forced the government to take its allies in the union movement seriously". Indeed, under Majola, Nehawu became highly influential in the Congress of South African Trade Unions (Cosatu) and more broadly in the governing Tripartite Alliance. Majola had links to both of Cosatu's Tripartite Alliance partners as a longstanding member of both the African National Congress (ANC) and the South African Communist Party (SACP).

By 2003, Majola's ties to the SACP appeared to be the source of some tension within Nehawu. An internal inquiry into Nehawu's affairs, commissioned by Cosatu and led by Senzeni Zokwana and Ebrahim Patel, concluded that, in addition to significant financial problems, Nehawu suffered from deep political division, with the membership apparently "polarised" between one pro-SACP faction, centred on Majola, and another anti-SACP faction, aligned to Nehawu president Vusi Nhlapo. Majola was first elected to the SACP Central Committee at the party's 12th National Congress, held in Port Elizabeth in July 2007, and by that time, he was viewed as a member of the "inner circle" of SACP leader Blade Nzimande. Majola has served on the Central Committee continuously since 2007 and he was later appointed to the party's politburo.

=== Support for Jacob Zuma ===
Meanwhile, in the ANC, Majola was reputed as a prominent and early supporter of ANC deputy president Jacob Zuma. In July 2005, after Zuma was ousted from the Deputy Presidency of South Africa and warned of impending corruption charges, businessman Don Mkhwanazi launched the Friends of Jacob Zuma Trust, which aimed to raise R12-million to cover Zuma's legal fees and upkeep. With Mkhwanazi and Sizwe Shezi, Majola was one of three trustees of the fund. Over the next two years, Majola was a political supporter of Zuma's bid to replace President Thabo Mbeki as ANC president, a bid which succeeded at the ANC's 52nd National Conference in Polokwane in December 2007.

Majola was himself rumoured to be in contention for election to the ANC National Executive Committee at the same party conference. His election did not come to fruition, however, and, ahead of the 2009 general election, he declined a nomination to stand for a parliamentary seat on the ANC's ticket; since Nehawu president Noluthando Sibiya had accepted her own nomination, he said that he would remain with the union in order to maintain a balance between the union's external influence and its internal strength.

Majola remained a political supporter of Zuma after he was elected as President of South Africa in May 2009. By 2011, Majola was a prominent member of a group of labour leaders – also including Blade Nzimande of the SACP, Frans Baleni of the National Union of Mineworkers, Mugwena Maluleke of the South African Democratic Teachers' Union, and Cosatu president Sdumo Dlamini – who were known to support Zuma's bid for a second term in the ANC presidency. In February 2012, the Sowetan reported that Majola had openly urged workers to rally behind Zuma during an address at the World Federation of Trade Unions in Johannesburg; Majola, however, clarified that it would be "inappropriate" for him to take a stance in the ANC's succession debate and that he was only expressing Cosatu's long-established support for the incumbent ANC leadership. Also during this period, in mid-2012, Nehawu endorsed proposals to nationalise key economic sectors, although it was not clear whether Majola personally supported the policy.

The ANC's 53rd National Conference was held at Mangaung in December 2012, and Zuma won a second term. In addition, Majola was himself elected to a five-year term on the ANC's National Executive Committee. His election – and that of other pro-Zuma trade unionists, including Thulas Nxesi, Sam Mashinini, and Senzeni Zokwana – was viewed as a "reward" for pro-Zuma campaigning. Majola defended his decision to accept nomination to the ANC leadership, saying that "Navigating between alliance positions is nothing new" and "To influence the ANC you need serving trade unionists".

=== Rift in Cosatu ===
Although Cosatu had initially been broadly unified in its support for Zuma, the issue became highly divisive in the run-up to Zuma's re-election. In particular, Cosatu general secretary Zwelinzima Vavi, previously a supporter of Zuma, instead became a vocal critic, and this led to a rift between the pro-Zuma camp, which included Majola, and Vavi's camp. In August 2011, the Mail & Guardian reported on an informal campaign by Zuma's supporters to oust Vavi and replace him with Majola. Indeed, Majola had longed been viewed as a possible successor to Vavi; as late as June 2010, Vavi himself was believed to favour Majola as his successor. News24 described Majola as a strong contender, as the "most senior and experienced" leader of any public-sector union, "idolised by his union members"; the Daily Maverick, however, concluded that he was "not popular enough to challenge Vavi".

Majola did not ultimately stand for the Cosatu office, but he remained on Cosatu's Central Executive Committee; he was a member from 1995 to 2014. Notably, he was one of only a handful of Cosatu leaders who also belonged to the SACP Central Committee; Vavi later accused him of having been SACP leader Nzimande's chief "ideologue" within Cosatu. Bheki Ntshalintshali, who went on to become Cosatu general secretary, alleged that Majola and other pro-Zuma members – Nzimande, Thulas Nxesi, and ANC secretary-general Gwede Mantashe – had formed an informal caucus, the so-called "progressive leaders", that had dominated the Central Executive Committee. He blamed the caucus for encouraging factionalism within the union federation during Zuma's presidency, particularly after Vavi broke with them. In Ntshalintshali's recollection:

Nzimande, Vavi, Mantashe, Majola and Nxesi were people who were sitting together deciding before the meetings of Cosatu. When they disagreed, when this thing disintegrated, they were hating [each other] like nobody's business. They were not even on speaking terms... My view is that they moved beyond the organisational relationship. They had a personal relationship. When there was disagreement, they moved in all directions. I think we need to avoid that.

At Nehawu's national congress in June 2013, at which Majola was re-elected unopposed to his final term as Nehawu general secretary, he delivered a particularly biting critique of Vavi in his secretariat report. In addition to raising concern about corruption at Cosatu headquarters, he accused Vavi of "deviation" from Cosatu policy, saying that Nehawu had concluded:

that there was a political strategic rupture within the federation, in particular with regard to our strategic posture as Cosatu on the one hand and the political views and organisational practice of the general secretary [Vavi] on the other hand... it is this political strategic rupture that constitutes the essence of the current internal instability and disarray within the federation.

In the same speech, in further veiled criticism of Vavi, Majola argued against the notion that the trade unions should take an "oppositional" stance with respect to the Tripartite Alliance partners and government. He said:

[I]n the process of this struggle [the National Democratic Revolution], these formations of the alliance of necessity become interdependent of each other. Therefore, it must be clear that within Cosatu when we speak of the ANC and SACP, we are speaking of our own – the spearhead of our national liberation movement and the vanguard of the South African working class. Cosatu is not an oppositional watchdog to the ANC and the alliance, and we are strategically opposed to all forces, be they nongovernmental organisations, institutes, political parties or the media, that are positioned as such. These are part of a larger project of the anti-majoritarian offensive.

== Career in government: 2014–present ==
=== Portfolio Committee on Energy: 2014–2019 ===
==== Nomination to Parliament ====
Ahead of the May 2014 general election, Cosatu launched a campaign for more union representation in the government of South Africa, and Majola was listed as an ANC parliamentary candidate, nominated initially by the ANC's local branches in Gauteng. He was elected to a seat in the National Assembly, the lower house of the South African Parliament, and announced that he would step down from Nehawu's leadership to take up his seat. Nehawu welcomed the election of Majola and other Nehawu leaders (including Thozama Mantashe and Joe Mpisi), and indeed, later in the legislative term, the union donated a R864,000 BMW X5 to Majola.

On 6 June 2014, Nehawu elected Bereng Soke, the outgoing deputy general secretary, to succeed Majola as general secretary. In his final secretariat report to the union, Majola argued that future challenges would "reshape South Africa's trade union movement", warning, "We mustn't be nostalgic... we must not expect to have the same Cosatu as we did in 1995".

The following week, the ANC announced that it would nominate Majola to chair Parliament's Portfolio Committee on Energy, with Zukisa Faku serving under him as the party's committee whip. He was duly elected to the chair, unopposed, at the committee's first meeting on 24 June. Majola said that he was surprised that he had been deployed to the energy committee, given his background, but joked that, having been born next to a small power station in Kragborn, "I've always had a relationship with power stations."

==== Nuclear deal ====
One of the central issues before the energy committee during Majola's tenure was an abortive nuclear power deal, signed between Zuma's government and Russian nuclear agency Rosatom. The committee involved itself in oversight of the deal at an early stage, complaining that Parliament had not been sufficiently consulted, and, over the objections of Tina Joemat-Pettersson's Ministry of Energy, it held public hearings to consult on the deal. In a September 2015 interview with City Press, Majola committed to ensuring transparency in the deal and said that his committee would seek to block it if it was ill-advised, saying:

I think we have entered a new phase of the nuclear procurement process. It is now irreversible that we are going to have to conduct it in a very transparent manner, and we are going to have to allow robust public engagement... I'm not scared to be on my own from time to time on something that is correct... I am certain that if the legislature is going to proceed in such a way that it becomes just a rubber stamp, then it will not be in the interests of the spirit of the Constitution, which is meant to ensure there can be balance in the exercise of power. If the legislature can’t say no, then there is no point in having a legislature as a counterbalance.

Newspapers described Majola as "a champion for transparency in the nuclear deal" and, later, as "a largely lone battlement against Zuma’s nuclear aspirations". He was criticised for closing a November 2016 committee meeting to the press, but he said that it was a "misunderstanding" and that the meeting had not discussed the nuclear deal.

==== Tripartite Alliance positions ====
Majola continued to serve in the SACP Central Committee while in Parliament, and he served the remainder of his five-year term on the ANC National Executive Committee. By 2017, there were signs that his support for Zuma had waned, with the Sunday Times reporting that he supported an anti-Zuma motion at a leadership meeting in May 2017. He was not re-elected to the National Executive Committee when his term expired at the ANC's 54th National Conference in December 2017.

=== Deputy Minister of Trade and Industry: 2019–2024 ===
Majola was re-elected to the National Assembly in the May 2019 general election, and, in the aftermath of the election, he was named as Deputy Minister of Trade and Industry by Zuma's successor, President Cyril Ramaphosa. With Nomalungelo Gina, he was one of two deputy ministers in the newly created Ministry of Trade, Industry and Competition and served under Minister Ebrahim Patel, also a former trade unionist. His appointment alongside Patel was viewed as a major coup for the union movement. A source told the Mail & Guardian that, until his promotion, Majola had been "very unhappy for a long time in Parliament as he was never considered for a [cabinet] post".

During Majola's tenure in the ministry, in July 2022, the SACP held its 15th National Congress, at which Majola was re-elected to the Central Committee. He was also reappointed to the party's politburo, now as secretary for organising and campaigns in the union movement; in that capacity, he is assisted by two assistant secretaries, Zola Saphetha and Tinyiko Ntini.

== Personal life ==
Majola met his wife while she was a shop steward in Mpumalanga and he was Nehawu's assistant general secretary. He also has a child with an official in Nehawu's Western Cape office.
