= Bheki (given name) =

Bheki is a masculine given name. It is also encountered as an abbreviation or shorthand for Bhekokwakhe, Bhekizizwe, Bhekumuzi. Notable people with the name include:

- Bheki Cele (born 1952), the South African Minister of Police since 2018
- Bheki Dlamini, acting Prime Minister of Swaziland (2008 to 2008)
- Bheki Hadebe, a South African politician
- Bheki W. J. Langa, a South African diplomat
- Bheki Lubisi (born 1986/1987), a South African politician
- Bheki Maphalala, the Chief Justice of the Kingdom of Eswatini
- Bheki Mtolo, a South African politician
- Bheki Mseleku (1955–2000), a South African jazz musician
- Bheki Ntuli (1957–2021), a South African politician
- Bheki Ntuli (eThekwini politician), a South African politician
- Bheki Ntshalintshali, a South African trade union leader
- Bheki Radebe (born 1965), a South African politician
- Bheki Sibiya (born 1973), a South African actor
- Bheki Shabangu (born 1985), a South African association football player
