= Mtolo =

Mtolo is a surname. Notable people with the surname include:

- Bheki Mtolo (fl. from 2010), South African politician
- Jeffrey Mtolo (fl. from 2025), South African politician
- Nombuso Mtolo (born 1981), South African politician
- Reuben Mtolo Phiri (born 1964), Zambian politician
- Siphamandla Mtolo (1993–2023), South African soccer player
- Willie Mtolo (born 1964), South African long-distance runner
- Wonder Mtolo (born 2000), South African cricketer

== See also ==
- Mto
