= Zingiswa Losi =

President of the Congress of South African Trade Unions

President of the Congress of South African Trade Unions
- Incumbent
- Assumed office 20 September 2018
- Secretary: Bheki Ntshalintshali
- First Deputy: Mike Shingange
- Second Deputy: Louise Chipe; Duncan Luvuno
- Preceded by: S'dumo Dlamini

Second Deputy President of the Congress of South African Trade Unions
- In office September 2009 – September 2018
- President: S'dumo Dlamini
- Secretary: Zwelinzima Vavi
- First Deputy: Tyotyo James
- Preceded by: Violet Seboni
- Succeeded by: Louise Chipe

Personal details
- Born: Zingiswa Phyllis Losi; 2 October 1975 (age 51) KwaZakhele, Port Elizabeth; Cape Province, South Africa
- Union affiliation: Police and Prisons Civil Rights Union (since 2014); National Union of Metalworkers of South Africa (2002–2014)
- Other political affiliations: African National Congress; South African Communist Party

Zingiswa Phyllis Losi (born 2 October 1975) is a South African politician and trade unionist who is currently serving as the general secretary of the Congress of South African Trade Unions (COSATU), having formerly served as president. She is a member of the Central Committee of the South African Communist Party (SACP) and a former member of the National Executive Committee of the African National Congress (ANC).

Born in the Eastern Cape, Losi became politically active as a youth activist in the Congress of South African Students and ANC Youth League. Her first job was as a technician in the South African National Defence Force, where she served from 1996 to 1999. Between 2001 and 2014, she worked for the Ford Motor Company in Port Elizabeth, and she joined the trade union movement in 2002 as a shop steward for the National Union of Metalworkers (Numsa), a large Cosatu affiliate. She served three terms as Cosatu's second deputy president, beginning at the federation's 10th national congress in September 2009.

Although she was elected to her Cosatu office as a representative of Numsa, she soon fell out with her union over her closeness with Cosatu president S'dumo Dlamini, who was a supporter of President Jacob Zuma and whose primary rival, Zwelinzima Vavi, was allied with Numsa. Losi was suspended from Numsa in September 2013, pending a disciplinary hearing, and in March 2014 she announced that she had left Ford and Numsa to work for the South African Police Service and serve as a shop steward for another Cosatu affiliate, the Police and Prisons Civil Rights Union (Popcru).

On 20 September 2018, Losi was elected unopposed to succeed Dlamini, becoming Cosatu's first woman president. Her election was backed by an impressive coalition of Cosatu affiliates, including the National Union of Mineworkers and National Education, Health and Allied Workers' Union. She was re-elected to a second four-year term in September 2022. In 2026, she was elected as general secretary of COSATU.

Losi has been a member of the SACP Central Committee since July 2017 and served on the ANC National Executive Committee from December 2017 to December 2022.

== Early life and education ==
Losi was born on 2 October 1975 in KwaZakhele in the former Cape Province, though her family moved to nearby New Brighton, outside Port Elizabeth, when she was a year old. She was one of nine children born to Graham Mzwandile Losi, who was a general assistant at a hospital and later a debt collector at a furniture shop, and Vuyiswa Esther Losi, who was a domestic worker and later a general assistant at a hospital. She has a twin sister named Zamela.

In New Brighton, she attended Phendla Lower Primary School and Phillip Nikiwe High School before matriculating at Ithembelihle Senior Secondary School. Her family was political – two of her elder siblings went into exile with the anti-apartheid movement in 1985 and 1986 – and she was active in the Congress of South African Students as a teenager. After matriculating, she enrolled at the University of South Africa to study economics in 1995, but she dropped out later the same year and returned home to study teaching at the Algoa College of Education.

== Early career and unionism ==
In 1996, Losi left her studies to join the South African National Defence Force as a technical assistant to aviation artisans; her posts included a stint at the South African Air Force base in Bloemfontein. She served in the military for three years, leaving in 1999, and the following year she relocated to Port Elizabeth, where she was a casual worker in JET clothing stores – as well as an active member of the African National Congress (ANC) Youth League in the Nelson Mandela Bay region – until 2001, when she was employed at Ford Motor Company. She worked for Ford until 2014, first as an operator in the engine components and assembly division and later as a quality inspector, and she joined the trade union movement in 2002 when she was elected as a shop steward for the National Union of Metalworkers of South Africa (Numsa).

== Cosatu deputy president: 2009–2018 ==
In September 2009, Losi attended the 10th national congress of the Congress of South African Trade Unions (Cosatu), South Africa's largest trade union federation, to which Numsa was affiliated. At the congress, held in Midrand, she was nominated and elected to succeed Violet Seboni, who had recently died, as second deputy president of Cosatu. She won the position in a vote against Boitumelo Louise Thipe of the South African Commercial, Catering and Allied Workers' Union (Saccawu).

She was elected to a second term in September 2012 and a third term in November 2015, serving under Cosatu president S'dumo Dlamini and alongside first deputy president Tyotyo James. During this period, she was also a member of a seven-member ministerial committee, under the chairmanship of Malegapuru Makgoba, that was established by Higher Education Minister Blade Nzimande in January 2013 to oversee racial and gender transformation in South African universities.

=== Swaziland democracy movement ===
During her first term as Cosatu deputy president, on 7 September 2011, Losi was arrested in Siteki, Swaziland, where she was scheduled to address a pro-democracy rally organised by the Swaziland Democracy Campaign. Ahead of her speech, Swazi police fired stun grenades and tear gas into the crowd and arrested Losi and a Cosatu colleague; they were questioned and deported back to South Africa. Losi remained a supporter of the Swazi democracy movement, pledging the solidarity of "the global working class" in September 2012.

=== Departure from Numsa ===
Losi's tenure as Cosatu deputy president coincided with political tumult in the federation, precipitated in particular by divisions between Cosatu president S'dumo Dlamini and Cosatu general-secretary Zwelinzima Vavi; among other things, the two top officials differed in their attitudes towards the incumbent ANC government, with Dlamini a renowned supporter of President Jacob Zuma. Cosatu worked closely with the ANC through the Tripartite Alliance. Losi's own union, Numsa, backed Vavi when he was suspended from the Cosatu secretariat in 2013, but she was nonetheless viewed as closely allied to Dlamini; by September 2013 the Mail & Guardian reported that Vavi's supporters were planning to remove Dlamini, Losi, and deputy general-secretary Bheki Ntshalintshali from their Cosatu offices on the grounds that they were "lackeys of ANC leaders".

Losi professed to be unconcerned by the rumours, denying that she and Dlamini were overly close to the Zuma-led ANC and saying that, "I will not be disturbed by people making noise in the periphery". She told the Mail & Guardian:

There is no such thing that we want to turn Cosatu into a sweetheart union. We have an alliance with the ANC and we continue to engage with the party. We continue to raise matters with the ANC in the alliance. We are an independent and autonomous. If that was not the case, we would not have taken to the streets to protest against e-tolling. We would not have said ban labour brokers. If we want to influence ANC policies, we have to work with them. We must continue to contest for our space in the alliance.

Later the same week, Losi publicly defended Cosatu's decision to campaign for the ANC ahead of the 2014 general election, despite strong opposition from Cosatu affiliates to the government's e-toll policy. Days later, Numsa announced that Losi had been suspended from her position as Numsa's shop steward at Ford, effective 26 September and pending a disciplinary inquiry on charges of bringing the union into disrepute. Her suspension from Numsa brought her position in Cosatu into question, because loss of membership in her Cosatu affiliate would have led to the loss of her Cosatu office. She later said that her suspension had been unconstitutional and the charges "trumped-up".

In mid-March 2014, amid rumours that Numsa was imminently to be expelled as a Cosatu affiliate, her disciplinary inquiry was pre-empted by the announcement that she had resigned from her job at Ford and therefore from Numsa. Shortly afterwards, it emerged that Losi had become a shop steward for the Police and Prisons Civil Rights Union (Popcru). To become eligible for that position, she joined the civil secretariat of the South African Police Service in Pretoria, where she was a deputy director as of 2018.

This left her position in Cosatu precarious, because the federation's constitution was not clear about the status of office-bearers who transferred from one affiliate to another. A final decision on Losi's status was long delayed, with the Cosatu central executive committee distracted by its quest to expel Numsa from the federation, although Irvin Jim, the general secretary of Numsa, objected to Losi's continued presence in central executive committee meetings on the basis that her departure from Numsa had invalidated her election to her Cosatu office. Jim also called on the Public Protector to investigate Losi's employment by the police, alleging that it come about "in a totally unprocedural manner". The Food and Allied Workers' Union (Fawu) likewise attempted to challenge Losi's right to attend meetings as deputy president. Indeed, the Mail & Guardian reported, based on a leaked document, that Fawu and seven other pro-Numsa "rebel" affiliates had budgeted R500,000 in legal costs to fund a continued challenge against Losi's right to hold the deputy presidency. FAWU general secretary Katishi Masemola also said that the group was lobbying unionists to "explain to workers the importance of worker control and how the appointment of Losi undermines this".

In November 2014, the Cosatu leadership resolved that Losi would remain in office as Cosatu deputy president until the expiry of her term. Her term expired at Cosatu's national congress in November 2015. Although some of Vavi's opponents reportedly supported a plan to elevate Losi to succeed Vavi as general secretary, she instead stood for a third term as second deputy president, and was re-elected unopposed, over Fawu's objections.

=== Tripartite Alliance ===
While Cosatu deputy president, Losi was an active member of both of Cosatu's Tripartite Alliance partners, the ANC and the South African Communist Party (SACP). In July 2017, she was elected for the first time to a five-year term as a member of the SACP Central Committee. Later the same year, she was touted as a candidate for higher office in the ANC, and she was nominated to stand for the position of deputy secretary-general at the ANC's 54th National Conference in December 2022. The conference, held at Nasrec, was hotly contested due to the race to succeed President Zuma as ANC president. Losi lost to the incumbent deputy secretary-general, Jessie Duarte, who received 2,474 votes to Losi's 2,213. She was viewed as a member of the slate of candidates aligned to winning presidential candidate Cyril Ramaphosa, while Duarte had backed the loser and Zuma's preferred successor, Nkosazana Dlamini-Zuma.

Despite Losi's defeat to Duarte, the conference elected her to a five-year term as an ordinary member of the ANC National Executive Committee (NEC); by number of votes received, she was ranked 22nd of the committee's 80 members. Weeks later, in early February 2018, Losi publicly supported calls for Zuma to resign as President of South Africa, telling a political gathering that:

As we move to the 2019 general election, we want to give back the ANC to its owners; the people of South Africa. As we do that, we must listen to the people of SA, we must listen to workers when they are saying for as long as we keep the president of the republic in power, the ANC brand becomes damaged.

However, Losi later said that she was not personally close to Ramaphosa, who soon succeeded Zuma as national president, and promised that her loyalty to workers trumped her loyalty to the ANC. Of her membership in the ANC leadership, she said, "What guides me in the NEC of the ANC are the positions of the federation [Cosatu]."

== Cosatu president: 2018–present ==
=== Election ===
By mid-2018, as the next Cosatu national congress approached and Zuma's influence waned, the Mail & Guardian reported that there was increasing support within the federation for a campaign for Losi to succeed Dlamini as president. The campaign was apparently led by the National Union of Mineworkers and the National Education, Health and Allied Workers' Union (Nehawu), and backed by Popcru, the Democratic Nursing Organisation of South Africa, and the South African Democratic Teachers' Union. Cosatu's affiliates subsequently held talks aimed at negotiating Dlamini's departure and ensuring an uncontested set of elections.

On 18 September 2018, at Cosatu's 13th national congress in Midrand, Losi was elected unopposed as president, with Mike Shingange of Nehawu as first deputy and Louise Chipe of Saccawu as second deputy. When her election was formally announced on 20 September, Losi was carried to the stage by delegates singing a variation of the struggle song Wathint' abafazi, with the lyrics, "Wathinta Losi, wathint' imbokodo" (When you strike Losi, you strike a rock); she was the first woman to hold the office. She said that her priorities would include recruiting new members, working towards Numsa's return to the federation, and addressing sexism and sexual harassment. Delegates at the 13th congress also resolved to support the ANC's campaign in the 2019 general election.

=== Re-election ===
In September 2022, Losi was re-elected unopposed for a second term as Cosatu president at the 14th national congress at the Gallagher Convention Centre in Midrand. Shingange returned as first deputy president, with Duncan Luvuno as the new second deputy. Popcru again backed Losi's candidacy. At her opening address to the congress, Losi reiterated Cosatu's allegiance to the ANC and Tripartite Alliance, pledging the union's support for efforts to rid the ANC of corruption.

During this period, Losi remained a member of the SACP Central Committee; she was re-elected to another five-year term on the committee at the party's 15th national congress in July 2022. However, her term on the ANC NEC expired in December 2022 and, though she was nominated to stand for re-election, she did not receive sufficient votes to return to the NEC.

In May 2025 Losi was part of the South African delegation that visited the White House with President Cyril Ramaphosa to meet U.S President ,Donald Trump.

== Personal life ==
Losi is unmarried and has two adult daughters. She later said that the birth of her first daughter, during her un-unionised military service, sparked her interest in worker representation, when her manager attempted to prevent her from living with her infant in single quarters.
