= Lubisi =

Lubisi is a South African surname. Notable people with the surname include:

- Bheki Lubisi (1986–2023), South African politician
- Cassius Lubisi (born 1955 or 1956), South African educationist and civil servant
- William Lubisi, South African politician

== See also ==
- Lubisi Dam, dam in South Africa
