= Noluthando Mayende-Sibiya =

South African politician and former trade unionist

Member of the National Assembly
- In office 2009 – 9 February 2011

Minister of Women, Youth, Children and People with Disabilities
- In office 11 May 2009 – 31 October 2010
- President: Jacob Zuma
- Preceded by: Position established
- Succeeded by: Lulu Xingwana

President of the National Education, Health and Allied Workers' Union
- In office 2004–2009
- General Secretary: Fikile Majola
- Preceded by: Vusi Nhlapo
- Succeeded by: Mzwandile Makwayiba

Personal details
- Party: African National Congress
- Other political affiliations: South African Communist Party; Congress of South African Trade Unions

Noluthando Mayende-Sibiya is a South African politician and former trade unionist who was the inaugural Minister of Women, Youth, Children and People with Disabilities from May 2009 to October 2010. Before that, she was the first woman president of the National Education, Health and Allied Workers' Union from 2004 to 2009.

A nurse by profession, Mayende-Sibiya joined Nehawu in Natal in 1988. During her tenure as president of the union, she was also an influential figure in the broader Tripartite Alliance: from 2007 to 2012, she served on the Central Committee of the South African Communist Party and on the National Executive Committee of the African National Congress (ANC).

Pursuant to the 2009 general election, Mayende-Sibiya took up an ANC seat in the National Assembly and was appointed to the cabinet by President Jacob Zuma. She was in office for less than two years before she was sacked at the end of October 2010. After that, she remained in the National Assembly for another three months, resigning in February 2011 when Zuma appointed her as South African Ambassador to Egypt.

== Early life and nursing career ==
Sibiya spent some years in Swaziland in her youth after her family went into exile there during apartheid. She trained as a nurse at the McCord School of Nursing in Durban in 1983, and two years later she qualified as a midwife at King Edward Memorial Hospital. From 1985 to 2007, she was a professional nurse at the Prince Mshiyeni Memorial Hospital in Umlazi, rising to become chief professional nurse there in 2007. In addition to her union involvement, Mayende-Sibiya was a member of the United Democratic Front, an anti-apartheid organisation, from the mid-1980s.

== Union career: 1988–2009 ==
In 1988, while working at Prince Mshiyeni, Mayende-Sibiya joined the National Education, Health and Allied Workers' Union (Nehawu); she was one of the first professionals to join the union at a time when it was dominated by blue-collar workers. Sdumo Dlamini was a nurse and union member at the same hospital. Mayende-Sibiya rose through the ranks to become second deputy president of the union from 1998 to 2004, during the presidency of Vusi Nhlapo.

=== Nehawu president ===
In July 2004, at Nehawu's national congress in Pretoria, Mayende-Sibiya ousted Nhlapo from the presidency, winning 243 votes to Nhlapo's 136. She was the first woman to hold the office, and her election was viewed as a triumph for the left wing of the union.

=== Tripartite Alliance ===
During her presidency of Nehawu, Mayende-Sibiya was viewed as a political supporter of Zwelinzima Vavi, the controversial general secretary of the Congress of South African Trade Unions (Cosatu). She also served in the top leadership structures of both of Cosatu's Tripartite Alliance partners, the South African Communist Party (SACP) and the African National Congress (ANC). First, she was elected to a five-year term on the SACP Central Committee at the party's 12th National Congress, held in Port Elizabeth in July 2007.

Then, at the ANC's 52nd National Conference in December 2007, she was narrowly elected to a concurrent five-year term as a member of the ANC National Executive Committee; her candidacy had been endorsed by Cosatu. By number of votes received, she was ranked 79th of the 80 ordinary members elected to the committee, receiving 1,345 votes from the roughly 4,000 voting delegates. She also served on the ANC's influential National Working Committee; she was co-opted as a member after Ncumisa Kondlo died.

== National Assembly: 2009–2011 ==
In the April 2009 general election, Mayende-Sibiya was elected to a seat in the National Assembly, the lower house of the South African Parliament. She was one of three unionists – the others being Alina Rantsolase and Thulas Nxesi – who represented the ANC by way of the Tripartite Alliance. She left her Nehawu office in order to take up the seat; the presidency was filled in an acting capacity by her former deputy, Lulamile Sotaka, until Mzwandile Makwayiba was elected as a permanent replacement in October 2010.

=== Cabinet minister ===
On 10 May 2009, Mayende-Sibiya was appointed to the first-term cabinet of newly elected President Jacob Zuma. She was named as Minister of Women, Youth, Children and People with Disabilities, a new portfolio whose establishment was inspired by a resolution of the ANC's 52nd National Conference.

By November 2009, media reports began to surface in which sources inside the ministry questioned Mayende-Sibiya's competence. At the end of the year, the Mail & Guardian reported that, though Mayende-Sibiya was influential in the ANC and SACP, her department lacked a clear programme and she had not yet consulted with women's groups in civil society. A 2010 readers' poll by the same newspaper suggested that Mayende-Sibiya was one of the three least popular ministers in the cabinet. The ANC Women's League was reportedly dissatisfied with her performance, but ANC chairperson Baleka Mbete defended her in September 2010, saying that she had been singled out "because she is a woman".

On 31 October 2010, President Zuma announced a major cabinet reshuffle in which Mayende-Sibiya was sacked and replaced by Lulu Xingwana. The opposition Democratic Alliance welcomed her dismissal and later said that she had been "a national embarrassment". She remained in her legislative seat as an ordinary Member of Parliament.

=== Resignation ===
In February 2011, it was announced that Mayende-Sibiya had been designated as South African Ambassador to Egypt. She therefore resigned from the National Assembly on 9 February, ceding her seat to Judith Tshabalala. She arrived in Cairo in April 2011.

== Personal life ==
Mayende-Sibiya is married. In August 2007, she spoke publicly about her experience with domestic violence in a former marriage, saying that she left her ex-husband in 1991 after he doused her in benzine and threatened to set her alight.

== See also ==
- History of the African National Congress
- Politics in South Africa

Trade union offices
Preceded by Vusi Nhlapo	President of the National Education, Health and Allied Workers' Union; 2004–2010	Succeeded by Mzwandile Makwayiba
