= Gregory Rockman =

South African politician and dissident policeman

Member of the National Assembly
- In office May 1994 – 1 May 2000

Personal details
- Born: 29 January 1959 (age 67)
- Citizenship: South Africa
- Party: African National Congress
- Other political affiliations: Police and Prisons Civil Rights Union

Gregory Rockman (born 29 January 1959) is a South African politician and former policeman who founded the Police and Prisons Civil Rights Union (POPCRU) and served as its inaugural president from 1989 to 1994. After that he represented the African National Congress (ANC) in the National Assembly from 1994 to 2000.

Rockman was a lieutenant in the apartheid-era South African Police in Mitchells Plain until September 1989, when he came forward to corroborate allegations of police brutality against anti-apartheid protestors. His claims led to criminal charges against two white officers and contributed to public pressure for police and political reform in South Africa. He founded POPCRU in November 1989 for other dissident policemen and continued to lead it after he was fired from the police force for his political activity in March 1990.

== Police career and POPCRU ==
Rockman was born on 29 January 1959. He was the son of an automotive machinist and was classified as coloured under apartheid-era racial classification laws. He joined the South African Police in 1977, at the age of the 18, in his account because he "wanted to serve my community as a protector". By 1989, he was a lieutenant in the crime prevention division at the police station in the coloured neighbourhood of Mitchells Plain, Cape Town.

=== Whistleblowing ===
Rockman made international news on 6 September 1989, the day of that year's general election, when he came forward with allegations of police brutality against protestors in Cape Town. The election had been preceded by nationwide unrest among the non-white majority, in which several people were allegedly killed in clashes with police, and Rockman told the South African Press Association that the unrest in Mitchells Plain had been caused by the "brutal and unprofessional conduct" of the riot police, who he said had teargassed, beaten, and whipped peaceful protestors, including schoolchildren, and curious onlookers. When Rockman tried to intervene, he was threatened with arrest by the riot police's commanding officer.

Rockman said that he was not prepared to act as an "oppressor" to his community. According to him, his decision to speak out publicly about police brutality had been "a long time coming" and many of his colleagues shared his concerns:

But they’re scared to talk because regulations bind them. I’m not willing for the regulations to bind me any further. I’m defying them... I don’t care whether they lock me up or what they do. They can do as they please but that won’t change me.

=== Aftermath ===
The New York Times said that Rockman's account lent credence to activists' accounts of police brutality and undermined the police force's credibility. Under public pressure, Adriaan Vlok's Ministry of Law and Order quickly appointed an inquiry to investigate Rockman's claims, banned the use of police whips, and declared publicly that it would not intervene in "peaceful and orderly protest". Two riot squad officers, a white major and lieutenant, were charged with assault for their role in the violent response to the 5 September protests, and Rockman served as the prosecution's chief witness, testifying that the men had "stormed the kids like wild dogs". The judge said that the police response was "not only illegal but utterly reprehensible", but the defendants were acquitted because they had not "consciously identified" with the actions of the subordinates who had carried out the response.

At the same time, Vlok opened an investigation into Rockman for breaking police rules by giving interviews to journalists. In November 1989, shortly after Rockman formed the Police and Prisons Civil Rights Union (POPCRU), he was transferred to a different police station in Pinelands; he was subsequently arrested for attending an illegal gathering – a protest against his own transfer – and suspended from the police force. In March 1990, Rockman announced that he would not participate in the police's internal disciplinary hearing against him, because he did not expect to receive a fair hearing. Later the same week, he was fired from the police force for his "involvement in strikes".

Also in March 1990, POPCRU organised South Africa's first police strike since 1917. An unrecognised union for dissident policemen and correctional officers, it led several major protests over the next few years, advocating for the reform of policing in non-white areas and for the abolition of apartheid. By 1993, the union had 15,000 members, mostly black, and Rockman remained its president until 1994.

== Parliament: 1994–2000 ==
In South Africa's first post-apartheid elections in 1994, Rockman was elected to represent the ANC in the National Assembly, and he was re-elected to his seat in 1999.

However, in March 2000, he announced that he had asked President Thabo Mbeki for permission to resign from Parliament in order to become chief executive of POPCRU's R10-million investment wing, established in 1999. His resignation took effect on 1 May 2000 and his seat in Parliament was filled by Henry Fazzie.

== Personal life ==
In 1989 Rockman was married and had two young children.
