= Vusi Nhlapo =

South African politician

Member of the National Assembly
- In office 24 July 2006 – May 2009

President of the National Education, Health and Allied Workers' Union
- In office 1993 – July 2004
- Succeeded by: Noluthando Mayende-Sibiya

Personal details
- Born: Vusi Herbert Nhlapo; 20 September 1956 (age 70) Orlando East, Soweto; Transvaal, Union of South Africa
- Citizenship: South Africa
- Party: African National Congress
- Children: 2

Vusi Herbert Nhlapo (born 20 September 1956) is a South African politician and former trade unionist. He was the president of the National Education, Health and Allied Workers' Union from 1993 to 2004. After that, he represented the African National Congress (ANC) in the National Assembly from 2006 to 2009.

== Early life and career ==
Nhlapo was born on 20 September 1956 in Orlando East in Soweto. He grew up in a two-roomed house with his parents—a plumber and a domestic worker—and seven siblings. He attended Orlando North Secondary and Madibane High, but, despite the politically charged environment of mid-1970s Soweto, he eschewed involvement in anti-apartheid politics; as the eldest son in the family, he was fixated on getting a job. He wanted to become an architect or lawyer.

His first job was as a clerk and insurance salesman at Metropolitan Homes Trust Life between 1977 and 1980. After being retrenched in 1980, he was employed for a year as a stock-counting clerk at Checkers before he was retrenched again. Thereafter he was unemployed for nearly three years. In 1984, he joined a laboratory at the zoology department of Witwatersrand University, where he worked for the next decade as a technician.

== Union activism ==
In 1986, Nhlapo joined the General and Allied Workers' Union (GAWU) on the Wits campus. Shortly afterwards, he began his union career as a GAWU shop steward. After GAWU affiliated with the Congress of South African Trade Unions (Cosatu), it was merged into Nehawu, a new sectoral union. Nhlapo was elected as Nehawu's vice-president in 1992 and as its president in 1993. He also remained in place as Nehawu's Wits shop steward, including during a particularly tense period of confrontation between the university's management, on one hand, and Nehawu and the South African Students Congress, on the other hand.

Nhlapo also served as Cosatu's chief negotiator in discussions with government on the restructuring of state assets. He occasionally made attempts to gain high office in Cosatu – in 1997, he entered into a contest with John Nkadimeng and Connie September over Nkadimeng's post as Cosatu vice-president, and in 1999, he was defeated by Willie Madisha in a contest over the Cosatu presidency. On the latter occasion, Nhlapo was viewed as the favoured candidate of ANC president Thabo Mbeki.

In 2002, Cosatu commissioned a commission of inquiry to investigate various financial and political problems in Nehawu. The commission was staffed by Senzeni Zokwana of the National Union of Mineworkers, Ebrahim Patel of the Southern African Clothing and Textile Workers Union, and Cosatu officials. Although its findings were not published after the inquiry concluded in 2003, the Mail & Guardian reported that the commission described Nehawu as highly polarised between two factions: one ANC-aligned faction, clustered around Nhlapo, and another faction aligned to the South African Communist Party, clustered around Slovo Majola. At Nehawu's next elective congress in July 2004 in Pretoria, the left-wing faction won a decisive victory: Nhlapo lost the Nehawu presidency to his former deputy, Noluthando Mayende-Sibiya, who received 243 votes to his 136.

== Legislative career ==
By the time Nhlapo was ousted from the Nehawu presidency, he was a candidate on the ANC's national party list; though not initially elected in the 2004 general election, he was in line to be sworn in when a casual vacancy arose. After Nathi Nhleko resigned from his seat in the National Assembly, Nhlapo was sworn in to replace him on 24 July 2006. He left Parliament at the 2009 general election.

== Personal life ==
As of 1994, Nhlapo was married and had two children.
