= Feminist pedagogy =

Pedagogical framework grounded in feminist theory

Feminist pedagogy is a pedagogical framework grounded in feminist theory. It embraces a set of epistemological theories, teaching strategies, approaches to content, classroom practices, and teacher-student relationships. Feminist pedagogy, along with other kinds of progressive and critical pedagogy, considers knowledge to be socially constructed.

== Overview ==
The purpose of feminist pedagogy is to create or remove standards in the classroom in ways that liberate students and their learning. For example, a classroom that is liberating and without any sort of binary. Feminist Pedagogy naturally creates a new method of teaching, where skills and knowledge are not just limited to a classroom but rather society as a whole. Classrooms that employ feminist pedagogy use the various and diverse experiences located within the space as opportunities to cultivate learning by using; life experiences as lessons, breaking down knowledge, and looking at gender, race, and class as one.

Feminist pedagogy addresses the power imbalances present in many westernized educational institutions and works toward de-centering that power. Within most traditional educational settings, the dominant power structure situates instructors as superior to students. Feminist pedagogy rejects this normative classroom dynamic, seeking to foster more democratic spaces functioning with the understanding that both teachers and students are subjects, not objects. Students are encouraged to reject normative positions of passivity and to instead take control of their own learning.

By taking action in their learning, students are encouraged to develop critical thinking and analytical skills. These abilities are then used to deconstruct and challenge the issues in our society such as, "oppressive characteristics of a society that has traditionally served the politically conservative and economic privileged."

The foundation of feminist pedagogy is grounded in critical theories of learning and teaching such as Paulo Freire's Pedagogy of the Oppressed. Feminist pedagogy is an engaged process facilitated by concrete classroom goals in which members learn to respect each other's differences, accomplish mutual goals, and help each other reach individual goals. This process facilitates participatory learning, validation of personal experience, encouragement of social understanding, and activism, and the development of critical thinking and open-minds. It identifies the practical applications of feminist theory, while promoting the importance of social change, specifically within the institutional hierarchy found in academia. Feminist pedagogy is employed most frequently in women's studies classes, which aim to transform students from objects to subjects of inquiry. However, the use of feminist pedagogy is not restricted only to women's studies courses.

== Atmosphere of Schools ==
Feminist pedagogy seeks to critique and correct perceived power imbalances between forms of hierarchical authority, such as educators and institutions, and students, who are believed to be typically granted much less social power and agency in the knowledge creation process. In this sense, feminist pedagogy aims to restructure traditional learning environments in favor of a communal and collaborative experience of education, which ultimately views students as equal contributors and sources of expertise.

The educational climate of schools, the result of dominant neoliberal competitive ideologies, does not prioritize communal processes of learning, research, and community action. Classroom power dynamics operating within neoliberal institutions exhibit a competitive style of engagement that employs fear and shame as a motivator for student growth. Traditional approaches to education maintain the status quo, reinforcing current power structures of domination. The "academic work process is essentially antagonistic to the working class, and academics, for the most part, live in a different world of culture, different ways that make it, too, antagonistic to working-class life." In contrast, feminist pedagogy rejects societal systems of oppression, recognizing and critiquing institutional and individual compliance associated with the academy that perpetuates larger ongoing societal oppression. The classroom is a microcosm of how power is disturbed and exercised in the larger society. "Students use subtle means to keep their vested power and attempt to enforce and replicate the status quo in the classroom."

== Qualities of feminist pedagogy ==
Critical pedagogy advances the idea that knowledge is not static and unitary but rather results from an open-ended process of negotiation and interaction between teacher and student. Feminist pedagogy, as an offshoot of critical pedagogy, further holds that gender plays a critical role in the classroom, influencing not only "what is taught, but how it is taught." Like all forms of critical pedagogy feminist pedagogy aims "to help students develop consciousness of freedom, recognize authoritarian tendencies, and connect knowledge to power and the ability to take constructive action." Feminist pedagogy aligns itself with many forms of critical pedagogy including those focused on race and ethnicity, class, post colonialism and globalization.

The introduction to the collection Feminist Pedagogy: Looking Back to Move Forward explained the qualities and distinctions from critical pedagogy:

Like Freire's liberatory pedagogy, feminist pedagogy is based on assumptions about power and consciousness-raising, acknowledges the existence of oppression as well as the possibility of ending it, and foregrounds the desire for and primary goal of social transformation. However feminist theorizing offers important complexities such as questioning the notion of a coherent social subject or essential identity, articulating the multifaceted and shifting nature of identities and oppressions, viewing the history and value of feminist consciousness-raising as distinct from Freirean methods, and focusing as much on the interrogation of the teacher's consciousness and social location as the student's.

Feminist pedagogy concerns itself with the examination of societal oppressions, working to dismantle the replication of them within the institutional settings. Feminist educators work to replace old paradigms of education with a new one which focuses on the individual's experience alongside acknowledgment of one's environment. It addresses the need for social change and focuses on educating those who are marginalized through strategies for empowering the self, building community, and ultimately developing leadership. Feminist pedagogy embodies a theory about knowledge transfer in the classroom by providing specific educational strategies, criteria, and techniques to meet the desired course goals or outcomes. Many distinctive qualities characterize feminist pedagogies and the instructional methods that arise out of feminist approaches. Of the associated attributes, some of the most prominent features include the development of reflexivity, critical thinking, personal and collective empowerment, the redistribution of power within the classroom setting, and active engagement in the processes of re-imaging. The critical skills fostered with the employment of a feminist pedagogical framework encourages recognition and active resistance to societal oppressions and exploitations. Also, feminist pedagogies position its epistemological inquiries within the context of social activism and societal transformation.

Reflectivity, essential to the execution of feminist pedagogy, allows students to examine the positions they occupy within society critically. Positions of privilege and marginalization are decoded, producing a theorization and greater understanding of one's multifaceted identity and the forces associated with the possession of a particular identity. Critical thinking is another quality of feminist pedagogy that is deeply interconnected with practices of reflectivity. The critical thinking encouraged by feminist pedagogy is firmly rooted in everyday lived experiences. Critical thinking is employed inside and outside of the classroom space to challenge dominant cultural narratives and structures.

Empowerment within the classroom setting is central to feminist pedagogical instructional techniques. Students are confirmed in their identities and experiences and are encouraged to share with the space personal understandings to build a diverse and intersectional base of knowledge. Classroom spaces that operate from within a feminist pedagogical framework value integrity of the participants and the collective respect of existing differences in experiences and knowledge. Validation of student realities fosters the development of individual talents and ability and solidification of group cohesion. Empowerment of the student body is achievable through the intentional dissemination of traditional classroom power relations. It is understood and central to the success and progression of the classroom space that power is shared throughout all its constituents. In traditional academic settings, the position of power is maintained through the authority exercised by the instructor. The structure of this power relation solely validates the teacher's experiences and knowledge, maintaining that students have little to offer in the facilitation of learning. At its core, feminist pedagogy aims to decenter power in the classroom to give students the opportunity to voice their perspectives, realities, knowledge, and needs. This tool will utilize the process of decentering power, where the educator distances themselves from their authority status and enables their students to have equal footing with them. Unlike many other methods of teaching, feminist pedagogy challenges lectures, memorization, and tests as methods for developing and transferring knowledge. Feminist pedagogy maintains that power in the classroom should be delicately balanced between teacher and students to inform curriculum and classroom practices. The sharing of energy creates a space for dialogue that reflects the multiple voices and realities of the students. By sharing the power and promoting voice among students, the educator and students move to a more a democratic and respectful relationship that recognizes the production of knowledge by both parties. The shared power also decentralizes dominant traditional understandings of learning by allowing students to engage with the professor freely, instead of having the professor give students information.

Feminist pedagogical theorists not only question the current climate of the classroom but engage in speculations of what it could exist as. Understandings facilitated within the classroom space is not meant to live within the confines of academia but are encouraged to promote social activism. Theory and classroom explorations are positioned to their social contexts and implications. Students are encouraged to take what they learn in the classroom and apply their understandings to institute social change.

== History ==
Feminist pedagogy evolved in conjunction with the growth of women's studies within the academic institution. The increased awareness of sexism occurring on college campuses and the need to promote professionalism within certain segments of the women's movement resulted in the institutionalization of women's studies programs. The institutionalization of women's studies programs, facilitated the challenging of existing canons and disciplines which is reflected in classroom teaching methods. "The field of Women's Studies has expanded dramatically since the first courses were offered in 1970. The critiques of dominant paradigms and compensatory research efforts that characterized its early stages generated an explosion of scholarship that has significantly expanded the undergraduate women's studies curriculum, made possible the development of graduate level instruction, and propelled efforts to integrate the evolving scholarship on women across the curriculum. Throughout the evolution of the field, the processes of teaching women's studies courses have received considerable scholarly attention, resulting in a significant body of theory that attempts to define elements of feminist teaching".

== Influential figures ==
=== Paulo Freire ===
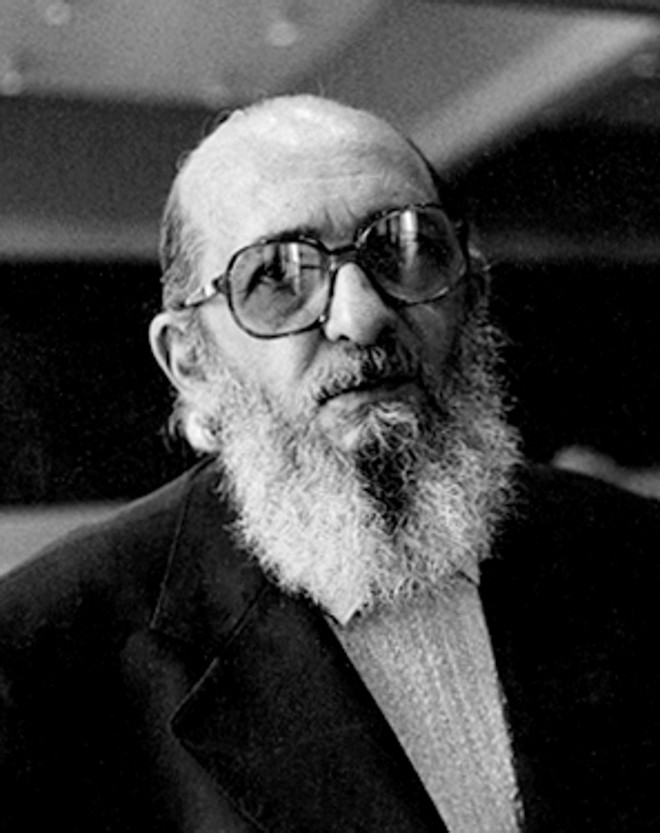
Paulo Freire

Theorist Paulo Freire is known for his work in the field of critical pedagogy, of which feminist pedagogy is a particular manifestation. In his book Pedagogy of the Oppressed 1968, Freire used Marxist theory to argue that the student-teacher relationship reflected and reinforced problematic societal power structures. He also argued against what he called the banking model of education, in which a student is viewed as an empty account waiting to be filled by the teacher, writing "it transforms students into receiving objects. It attempts to control thinking and action, leads men and women to adjust to the world, and inhibits their creative power."

Freire's work emphasized the need for teachers to eschew their class perspective and see both education and revolution as process of shared understanding between the teacher and the taught, the leader and the led. Feminist pedagogy, as it has developed in the United States, provides a historically situated example of critical pedagogy in practice. Feminist conceptions of education are similar to Freire's pedagogy in a variety of ways, and feminist educators often cite Freire as the educational theorist who comes closest to the approach and goals of feminist pedagogy. Both feminist pedagogy as it is usually defined and Freirean pedagogy rest upon visions of social transformation; underlying both are certain common assumptions concerning oppression, consciousness, and historical change. Both pedagogies assert the existence of oppression in people's material conditions of existence and as a part of consciousness. They also rest on a view of consciousness as more than a sum of dominating discourses, but as containing within it a critical capacity — what Antonio Gramsci called "good sense"; and both thus see human beings as subjects and actors in history and hold a strong commitment to justice and a vision of a better world and the potential for liberation.

=== bell hooks ===
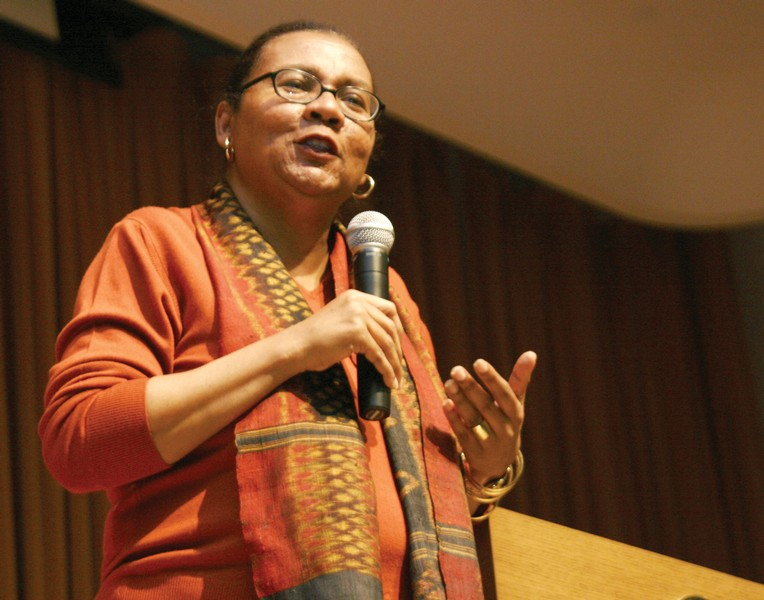
bell hooks

bell hooks (1952-2021) was an accomplished American writer, author, feminist, and social activist. In Teaching to Transgress: Education as the Practice of Freedom, she argues that a teacher's use of control and power over students dulls the students' enthusiasm and teaches obedience to authority, "confining each pupil to a rote, assembly-line approach to learning." She advocated that universities encourage students and teachers to collaborate, making learning more relaxing while simultaneously exciting. She describes teaching as "a catalyst that calls everyone to become more and more engaged" in what she calls engaged, interactive, transgressive pedagogies. hooks' pedagogical practices exist as an interplay of anti-colonial, critical, and feminist pedagogies and are based on freedom, "Creating a Community in the Classroom" that resembles both democratic process and healthy family life, as shaped by 'mutual willingness to listen, to argue, to disagree, and to make peace'.

Hooks also built a bridge between critical thinking and real-life situations, to enable educators to show students the everyday world instead of the stereotypical perspective of the world. hooks argues that teachers and students should engage in interrogations of cultural assumptions that are supported by oppression.

=== Patti Lather ===
Patti Lather has taught qualitative research, feminist methodology, and gender and education at Ohio State University since 1988. She is a renowned feminist author with a total of four published books. Lather focuses on critical feminist issues and theories, and has recently started research on the relationship between feminism and education.

=== Ileana Jiménez ===
Ileana Jiménez is a high school teacher in New York City who teaches courses on feminism, LGBT literature, Toni Morrison, and memoir writing. She is nationally known for her book and speaking about inclusivity in high schools, her work to make schools safer spaces for LGBT students, and has won numerous awards for curriculum development.She was heavily influenced in her feminism and her pedagogy by bell hooks.

Jiménez teaches a class at Elisabeth Irwin High School in New York called "Fierce and Fabulous: Feminist Writers, Artists, and Activists." This class consists of juniors and seniors. The objective of this class is to bring feminism to the attention of teens. Educate through an intersectional lens to help students comprehend their lives. Jiménez wants to apply the feminist pedagogy to engage her students with the national and global issues of our everyday lives. "Intersections, which explains how intersectionality helps understand power and oppression, identity and agency."

=== Judy Chicago ===
Judy Chicago is an American artist, art educator and writer. She is best known for her work as a feminist artist and a pioneering feminist educator in the arts. Chicago developed the first feminist art program at Fresno State College in 1970. In 1972 Womanhouse was exhibited at CalArts to an audience of over 10,000. This large scale installation was the product of Judy Chicago and Miriam Schapiro Feminist Art Program and one of the first art pieces of its kind to center the experiences of women. Since then, Chicago has become a leading voice in Art Education. Her career as an art educator is chronicled in her 2014 book Institutional Time: A Critique of Art Education. Her collection of feminist teaching materials from 1970 to 2005 are archived at Penn State University where it is accessible through the Judy Chicago Art Education Collection.

== Practical implementation ==
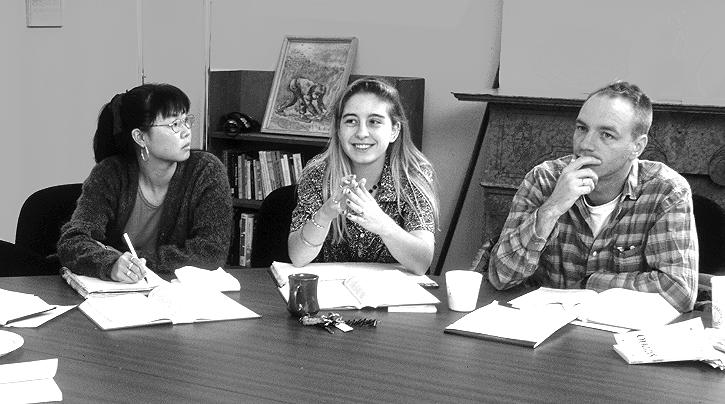
Shimer College students engage in a decentered discussion of Sappho.

At its core, feminist pedagogy aims to decenter power in the classroom to give students the opportunity to voice their perspectives, realities, knowledge, and needs. This can be utilized through the process of decentering power, where the educator distances themselves from their authority status and enables their students to have equal footing with them. Pedagogy can also be implemented practically by engaging in activism, within the classroom and outside of it.

=== Decentering power ===
One of the central tenets of feminist pedagogy is transforming the teacher and student relationship. Under this teaching method, educators seek to empower students by offering opportunities for critical thinking, self-analysis, and development of voice. Unlike many other ways of teaching, feminist pedagogy challenges lectures, memorization, and tests as methods for developing and transferring knowledge. Feminist pedagogy maintains that power in the classroom should be delicately balanced between teacher and students to inform curriculum and classroom practices. The decentralized power creates a space for dialogue that reflects the multiple voices and realities of the students.

By sharing the power, the educator and students move to an equal position in which students are given space to produce knowledge.

=== Consciousness Raising ===
One of the primary methods that feminist teachers utilize this decentering of power is through the process known as "consciousness raising." Popularized in the early 1970s, the technique is implemented usually by sitting in a circle and discussing one's own experiences and by finding commonalities that individuals thought were only personal matters of their own lives. Ideally, consciousness raising is used as a method to increase the number of people who are aware of a social issue or problem.

=== Questioning and Debriefing ===
Similar to Consciousness Raising, questioning and debriefing calls for a discussion. The idea of it is to help students realize their own personal stereotypes that stem from race, class, and any other background characteristics. The end goal is to create a reflective discussion on how each of them have more than likely been a victim of some type of discrimination and to call for action from that moment on. The call for action could include bringing in guest speakers and having them hear other stories, or for a more interactive assignment perform a skit. Whatever it may be the objective is to acknowledge and end the prejudice behavior.

=== Activist projects ===
Activist projects encourage students to identify real-life forms of oppression and to recognize the potential of feminist discourse outside of the academic realm. The goals of this practical application of feminist pedagogy include raising students' consciousness about patriarchal oppression, empowering them to take action, and helping them learn specific political strategies for activism. Students' activist projects have taken a variety of forms, including organizing letter-writing campaigns or writing letters to the editor, confronting campus administration or local law enforcement agencies, organizing groups to picket events, and participating in national marches.

Feminist teachers who have written about their experiences assigning activist projects recognize that this non-traditional method can be difficult for students. One noted difficulty along the way, including students who resisted putting themselves in a controversial position and students who had trouble dealing with backlash. Since they want students to have a positive, yet challenging (often first) experience with activism, they often give students a great deal of freedom in choosing a project. Teachers may ask students to develop a project that would "protest sexism, racism, homophobia, or any other 'ism' related to feminist thought in one situation."

== Feminist assessment ==
The literature on feminist assessment is sparse, possibly because of the discrepancy between notions of feminism and assessment. For example, traditional assessments such as standardized tests validate the banking model of education, and the concept of assessment in the form of grades or ability to advance within a structured curriculum is a form of power held by an institution. Nonetheless, the literature on feminist pedagogy does contain a few examples of feminist assessment techniques. These techniques decenter the power structure upheld by traditional assessment by focusing on student voice and experience, which allows students agency as they participate in the assessment process.

The use of journaling is considered to be one feminist assessment technique as well as the idea of "participatory evaluation," or evaluations characterized by interactivity and trust. Assessment techniques borrowed from critical pedagogy should be considered when thinking of feminist assessment approaches. These may include involving students in the creation of assessment criteria or peer assessment or self-assessment. Finally, Accardi argues feminist assessment approaches can be embedded into more traditional forms of assessment (such as classroom assessment techniques or performance assessment techniques) if students are allowed to reflect on or evaluate their experiences. Surveys, interviewing and focus groups, too, could be considered assessments with a feminist approach provided that a student voice or knowledge is sought. These assessment strategies should be tailored to the type of instruction taking place; performance assessment techniques may be more appropriate for short term instruction. If the instructor has more time with the learner, then the opportunity for more in-depth, reflective feedback and assessment is possible.

== Critiques ==
There are several elements of feminist pedagogy that has been criticized over the years. The distinctiveness of feminist pedagogy from other critical and progressive pedagogies have been brought into question.

Feminist pedagogy shares intellectual and political roots with the movements comprising the liberator education agenda of the past 30 years. These movements have challenged traditional conceptions of the nature and role of education, and of relationships among teachers, learners, and knowledge. They have promoted efforts to democratize the classroom, to clarify and expose power relationships within and outside the classroom, and to encourage student agency, both personal and political. Moreover, they have called for education to be relevant to social concerns, arguing that knowledge generated and transmitted in the classroom should relate to the lives of those it describes and facilitate social justice in the world at large.

Exploring the similarities between feminist and other critical and progressive pedagogies, the argument that feminist pedagogy is not entirely distinct from other pedagogies in its ideologies and strategies contains some validity.

Feminist pedagogy aims to redistribute power throughout the classroom. Although attempts to restructure power relations there remains the possibility of maintaining traditional educational hierarchy in feminist classrooms. "Even those professors who embrace the tenets of critical pedagogy (many of whom are white and male) still conduct their classrooms in a manner that only reinforced bourgeois models of decorum." The intentionality behind efforts to redistribute power have the possibility of simply masking power relations rather than authenticity exposing and addressing the compositional makeup of power. Regardless of efforts to create a more egalitarian teacher/student interactions, teachers still largely determine the direction of the classroom, it is teachers who "set the agenda and assign grades, not the students. Feminist Pedagogy, focusing acutely on the power relations between student and teacher can often fail to address the power dynamics that operate among class participants. "As the classroom becomes more diverse, teachers are faced with the way the politics of domination are often reproduced in the educational setting. For example, white male students continue to be the most vocal in our classes. Students of color and some white women express fear that they will be judged as intellectually inadequate by these peers.

Hegemonic white feminism has been criticized for being oppressive in its failure to address and incorporate intersectionality within its ideological consciousness. Many have charged American feminism with claims of racism class elitism from within its mostly academic boundaries, charging that American feminism has become another sphere of academic elitism. Many white female (and male) scholars, even self-identified feminists, do not value everyone's presence in the collective effort of women's or human liberation, hooks refers to these folks as co-oppressors in society, alongside others from privileged classes who do not participate in struggles against oppression in our complex society.

Bernice Fisher points out how feminist pedagogy is at odds with its historical roots in the tradition of "consciousness raising." {citation needed} Consciousness raising groups were an important part of the women's liberation movement of the 1960s and 1970s. Through these groups, individuals were able to recognize that they shared similar struggles. Thus the number of people aware of a particular social issue increased. "Most discussion of feminist pedagogy can be seen as a struggle to reconcile the consciousness raising vision with the realities of higher education. Since the latter assumes and generally supports competition and an individualistic orientation toward learning, one of the first problems for the feminist teacher is to create the kind of trust which consciousness raising presupposes." With the institutionalization of women's studies within the academic, feminist teacher were dispersed into "less radical universities, community colleges and other contexts where the rhetoric of feminism was far less familiar and more threatening, the situation tended to be reversed, teachers who were activists were in touch with, or part of, the changing women's movement, and in a sense became its representatives to the students.
