= Mpapa Kanyane =

South African politician

Mpapa Kanyane MPL

Member of the Gauteng Provincial Legislature
- Incumbent
- Assumed office 21 May 2014

Personal details
- Born: Transvaal, South Africa
- Party: African National Congress
- Other political affiliations: South African Communist Party
- Education: University of the North

Mpapa Jeremia Kanyane is a South African politician who has represented the African National Congress (ANC) in the Gauteng Provincial Legislature since 2014. A teacher by training, he has also served since 2012 as the Deputy Provincial Secretary of the South African Communist Party (SACP) in Gauteng.

== Early life and career ==
Kanyane is from Zebediela in present-day Limpopo. He has two Bachelor's degrees and a Master of Education from the University of the North. He became politically active in his youth through the anti-apartheid movement and, while teaching at a high school in Mahwelereng, he was a founding member of the Northern Transvaal Teachers Union. He joined the ANC-affiliated South African Democratic Teachers Union when it was founded in 1990.

In later years, Kanyane worked in policy research – at the South African Committee for Higher Education, at the Community Agency for Social Enquiry, and as research director at the American Bureau of Justice Assistance – and then as head of communications for the business arm of the Police and Prisons Civil Rights Union, an affiliate of the Congress of South African Trade Unions.

== Political career ==
Kanyane attained political prominence as a regional leader of the SACP on the East Rand. In 2012, he was elected as First Deputy Secretary of the SACP's Gauteng provincial branch, serving under Provincial Secretary Jacob Mamabolo. He initially held the office full-time, but in 2014 he was additionally elected to the Gauteng Provincial Legislature, ranked 26th on the ANC's provincial party list. He was re-elected to a third term in his SACP office in 2018, and he was re-elected to his legislative seat in the 2019 general election, ranked 37th on the ANC's party list.

He remained in office as SACP Deputy Provincial Secretary as of November 2022. In February 2023, he was appointed acting chairperson of the provincial legislature's Portfolio Committee on Finance after the incumbent chairperson, Parks Tau, resigned from the legislature.

== Personal life ==
He is married with three children and is also a published author of fiction.
