= NEHAWU v Tsatsi =

South African legal case

NEHAWU v Tsatsi is an important case in South African law, in particular the law of delict. It was heard before the Supreme Court of Appeal (SCA) on 14 November 2005, with judgment handed down on 1 December.

== Facts ==
Tsatsi claimed damages for defamation from National Education, Health and Allied Workers' Union (NEHAWU), alleging vicarious liability for certain defamatory statements contained in a report prepared by its branch secretary (the second appellant in this case) and distributed to members in attendance at a NEHAWU general meeting held at the Johannesburg Magistrate's Court. The branch secretary was the senior interpreter at the court, and Tsatsi its manageress.

After the meeting, certain court staffers, unaffiliated with NEHAWU, came into possession of copies of the report, and thus of two allegedly defamatory statements:

1. that Tsatsi "embraces fraudsters"; and
2. that she "unleashes unprecedented harassment" upon court staff.

The appellants, NEHAWU and its branch secretary, denied that the statements were defamatory; in addition, they claimed qualified privilege. The court a quo, however, found that the statements were indeed defamatory, that qualified privilege did not cover their distribution to non-NEHAWU members, and that the appellants were liable for their failure to take steps to prevent such distribution. They appealed this decision.

== Findings ==
The SCA agreed that the first statement was defamatory. The suggestion that Tsatsi had colluded with or condoned "fraudsters" served in itself to tarnish and discredit her social and professional standing. It was doubtful that the second statement was defamatory; if it were, however, the defamation was only slight.

The next question was whether or not these statements were protected by qualified privilege. To establish privilege, the appellants had to show that they had a reciprocal right and duty to make and receive the report, and that the defamatory statements were relevant or germane and reasonably appropriate to the occasion. One of the recognised occasions that enjoys qualified privilege is where such statements are published in the discharge of a duty or in the exercise of a right.

Whether the statements were relevant to the occasion essentially involved a value judgment. The branch secretary had had the right to make the allegations and impart them to NEHAWU members; the latter had a reciprocal right to receive them, which right is underlined by the Constitution of South Africa. The court found that the relevance of the statements could not be disputed.

There was, however, no evidence to show that the appellants had authorised or were otherwise responsible for the republication of the report to non-NEHAWU members. They could not therefore be held liable for it. The finding of the court a quo in this regard—that the appellants ought to have taken steps to prevent the republication—was determined to be without legal basis.

The court accordingly upheld the appeal.
