= Mike Shingange =

South African trade union leader

Michael Madala Shingange is a South African trade union leader.

Shingange joined the National Education, Health and Allied Workers' Union (NEHAWU) in 1995 and was soon elected as chair of its Giyani branch. He worked in a succession of hospitals while remaining active in the union, becoming regional deputy chair of its Lowveld Region in 2006. In 2008, he moved to become regional deputy chair of Limpopo, then as acting chair from 2009 and chair from 2011. In 2014, he was elected as first deputy chair of NEHAWU, also serving as chief negotiator on the Public Health and Social Development Sectoral Bargaining Council.

Shingange was elected as first deputy president of the Congress of South African Trade Unions (COSATU) in 2018, then in 2021 was additionally elected as president of NEHAWU. In 2026, he decided to run to become president of COSATU, but this was opposed by NEHAWU, which suspended him from office. In protest at his attempt to run, several unions, including NEHAWU, refused to hand over lists of delegates, leading the congress to be postponed. A court ruled that his suspension did not bar him from running for the presidency of COSATU, and in October he was elected, defeating Mabutho Cele.

Shingange is also active in the South African Communist Party and serves on its central committee. Since 2023, he has been a vice president of the World Federation of Trade Unions.

Trade union offices
Preceded by Tyotyo James	First Deputy President of the Congress of South African Trade Unions; 2018–2026	Succeeded by Susan Khumalo
Preceded by Mzwandile Makwayiba	President of the National Education, Health and Allied Workers' Union; 2021–2026	Succeeded by Nyameka Macanda
Preceded by Zingiswa Losi	President of the Congress of South African Trade Unions; 2026–present	Succeeded by Incumbent
