= Frans Baleni =

South African businessman

4th General Secretary of the National Union of Mineworkers
- In office 2006–2015
- Preceded by: Gwede Mantashe
- Succeeded by: David Sipunzi

Personal details
- Born: Msokoli Frans Baleni; 1959 or 1960 (age 63 or 64) Orange Free State, South Africa
- Other political affiliations: South African Communist Party
- Spouse: Phindile Baleni
- Occupation: Trade unionist; politician; businessman

Msokoli Frans Baleni (born 1959 or 1960) is a South African businessman and former trade unionist who was general secretary of the National Union of Mineworkers between 2006 and 2015. Since 2007, he has been a member of the Central Committee of the South African Communist Party.

== Early life ==
Baleni was born in the Free State and attended high school in the Eastern Cape on a bursary, until he moved back to the Free State in 1979 when his political activity had attracted the attention of Eastern Cape police. Between 1979 and 1988, he worked as a gold miner in Welkom, Free State, at an Anglo American (then AngloGold) mine.

== 1982–2015: Trade union career ==
He was a founding member of the National Union of Mineworkers in 1982, and the next year was elected a shaft shop steward at Western Holdings mine in Welkom. He was a strike leader, and one of the youngest negotiators, during the August 1987 national mining strike, the largest in the NUM's history. By 1993, he was head of the organising department, and was later the chief education officer. In 2006, he succeeded Gwede Mantashe as general secretary of NUM, by then the biggest union in the country and the most powerful affiliate of the Congress of South African Trade Unions (Cosatu). He was elected unopposed after the other contestant, Archie Phalane, was disqualified on a technicality, and he was thought to have the support of Mantashe, who has been described as his mentor. He was general secretary between 2006 and 2015, gaining re-election in both 2009 and 2012.

"[I]t does become problematic... when it serves as an umpteenth example of the notion that NUM and Baleni in particular are seemingly more comfortable in the company of business than the workers they represent." – City Press on Baleni's closeness with mining bosses, published under the headline "Where does Baleni's loyalty lie?", 2013

=== NUM decline ===
He presided over a period of declining influence and membership at the NUM, particularly in the platinum belt in the north-east of the country. Although one factor was the general decline of the South African mining sector, the NUM also lost influence to the Association of Mineworkers and Construction Union (Amcu), founded in 2001 and now a major force in the platinum mines. In 2012 and 2013, conflict between the NUM and Amcu led to violence in Rustenberg, North West province, both among Lonmin miners and among Anglo American Platinum miners. After the Marikana massacre, when police shot and killed miners in an Amcu-led wildcat strike at the Lonmin mine, Baleni defended the police's actions.

Among other things, the NUM was criticised for its and Baleni's perceived closeness to mining bosses and to the government, to the extent that critics nicknamed the union the "National Union of Management." Stephen Grootes writes that Baleni "almost epitomised 'union establishment,'" and, similarly, Raphaël Botiveau says he "embodies the ideal type of the 'trade union executive.'" Botiveau also claims that he subscribed to "a version of communist ideology that is characterised by the exercise of tight control over the organisation." In 2012, there was a minor scandal when his salary was leaked to the Mail & Guardian, which identified him as "one of the highest-paid unionists in South Africa."

Baleni was seen as something of an elder in Cosatu... What Baleni wanted, Baleni got.

— Daily Maverick, 2015

=== Politics ===
Baleni, and the NUM under his leadership, have been criticised for their perceived preoccupation with a political agenda, at the expense of attention to labour grievances. This criticism related to Tripartite Alliance politics as well as to inter-union rivalries. Baleni was reportedly close to his predecessor, Mantashe, who by then was secretary general of the ruling African National Congress (ANC), and he was allied to the South African Communist Party under Blade Nzimande – he had been elected to its Central Committee months after he was elected general secretary. In Cosatu, he was seen as allied with Cosatu president S'dumo Dlamini, who in turn was a key ally of eventual national president Jacob Zuma. Indeed, Baleni himself has been described as "a leading figure" in Zuma's campaign for re-election as ANC president ahead of the ANC's 2012 Mangaung conference. He was seen as "a key player in leading the offensive" against Cosatu general secretary Zwelinzima Vavi and the National Union of Metalworkers (Numsa) when they were expelled from Cosatu in 2014 and 2015 respectively. He also had an antagonistic relationship with Julius Malema, the former president of the ANC Youth League.

Although Baleni supports state intervention in strategic economic sectors, he is opposed to nationalising the mines – according to the Mail & Guardian, on "pragmatic" grounds. He has not taken up political leadership positions outside the NUM, except in the SACP. He declined an ANC nomination for a seat in the National Assembly of Parliament in 2009. In 2011, he was rumoured to be a potential candidate for the next general secretary of COSATU, when Vavi was believed to be stepping down, although left-wing critics objected to his perceived sympathy for the government's economic policies.

=== Ousting ===
Baleni was removed as general secretary in June 2015, when the Free State regional secretary, David Sipunzi, narrowly beat him in a vote: Baleni won 345 votes and Sipunzi 357. The result of the vote was described as unexpected, and local commentators viewed it as reflecting a shift of momentous significance, with journalist Max du Preez calling it "a political earthquake." According to a leftist source, it was a "heavy blow" to the right wing of the union and of Cosatu. The Mail & Guardian said that the election "threatened to split the union."

Local commentators believed that the expulsion of Vavi and Numsa had been the decisive issue in the leadership contest – Sipunzi was notably more sympathetic towards them than Baleni. Forbes saw Baleni's perceived closeness with the mining companies as another crucial issue, quipping, "Apparently, many in NUM felt the gentlemanly Baleni may have been too gentlemanly in dealing with the mining bosses."

== Career in public entities ==
After losing the 2015 election, Baleni retired from union work. In December 2018, President Cyril Ramaphosa appointed him to the Eskom sustainability task team, which reviewed the turnaround plan and long-term strategy of the public power utility. In October 2019, he was appointed chairperson of the board of PetroSA, the state-owned oil and gas company, where he is implementing a corporate turnaround, and he was appointed to the board of the Public Investment Corporation, the state-owned asset manager, in November 2021. He has also been on the board, at one point as deputy chairperson, of the state-owned Development Bank of Southern Africa.

He is viewed as a political supporter of Ramaphosa (also a former NUM general secretary).

== Personal life ==
Baleni's wife, Andeya Merriam Baleni, died in a car accident in December 2006. He remarried to Phindile Baleni, an attorney who became South Africa's first female director-general in the presidency in 2021. As of 2018, he lived in Boksburg, Gauteng.

== See also ==
- United Democratic Front

Trade union offices
Preceded by Gwede Mantashe	General Secretary of the National Union of Mineworkers; 2006–2015	Succeeded by David Sipunzi
