= Mzwandile Makwayiba =

South African trade unionist

Michael Mzwandile Makwayiba is a South African trade unionist.

Born in Ntlangaza, in the Eastern Cape, Makwayiba began working on an apple farm in Grabouw. In 1990, he moved to work as a cleaner at the Green Point-Somerset Hospital. There, he joined the Health Workers' Union. He soon became one of the union's most prominent activists, and was elected as its deputy president in 1992. In 1993, the union decided to merge into the National Education, Health and Allied Workers' Union (NEHAWU), and Makwayiba became deputy chair of its Western Cape region, and chair of its Cape Town branch. In 1997, he was elected as chair of the union's Western Cape region, also becoming chair of the Congress of South African Trade Unions in the Western Cape.

In 2004, Makwayiba was elected as second deputy president of NEHAWU, then in 2010 rose to become the union's president. In 2016, he was additionally elected as president of the World Federation of Trade Unions.

Trade union offices
Preceded by Noluthando Mayende-Sibiya	President of the National Education, Health and Allied Workers' Union; 2010–2021	Succeeded by Mike Shingange
Preceded by Shaban Assouz	President of the World Federation of Trade Unions; 2016–present	Succeeded by Incumbent
