= Mdumiseni Ntuli =

South African politician (born 1979)

The Honourable Mdumiseni Ntuli MP

Chief Whip of the Majority Party
- Incumbent
- Assumed office 14 June 2024
- Preceded by: Pemmy Majodina

Member of the National Assembly of South Africa
- Incumbent
- Assumed office 14 June 2024

Provincial Secretary of the African National Congress in KwaZulu-Natal
- In office July 2018 – July 2022
- Deputy: Sipho Hlomuka
- Chairperson: Sihle Zikalala
- Preceded by: Super Zuma
- Succeeded by: Bheki Mtolo

Member of the KwaZulu-Natal Provincial Legislature
- In office May 2016 – July 2018

Personal details
- Born: 5 March 1979 (age 47) KwaXimba, eThekwini; KwaZulu-Natal, South Africa
- Party: African National Congress
- Relations: Bheki Ntuli (uncle); Thembo Ntuli (brother)
- Education: University of KwaZulu-Natal

Mdumiseni Ntuli (born 5 March 1979) is a South African politician. He has represented the African National Congress (ANC) in the National Assembly since June 2024, and he formerly served in the KwaZulu-Natal Provincial Legislature from May 2016 to July 2018. He left the latter position to serve as Provincial Secretary of the ANC's KwaZulu-Natal branch, an office he held between 2018 and 2022.

A former member of the ANC Youth League, Ntuli rose to prominence as a member and spokesperson of the Provincial Executive Committee of the KwaZulu-Natal ANC. He also spent a decade working for the ANC as an administrator and organiser at its national headquarters at Luthuli House. After a failed bid to become national ANC secretary-general, he was elected to a five-year term on the party's National Executive Committee in December 2022.

== Early life and career ==
Ntuli was born on 5 March 1979 in rural KwaXimba outside Cato Ridge in KwaZulu-Natal. The area was a stronghold of the African National Congress (ANC), Ntuli's political party, and his family were influential in ANC politics in the area: both his uncle, Bheki, and his brother, Thembo, are ANC politicians in KwaZulu-Natal. Thembo has served as regional secretary of the ANC Youth League in eThekwini, as well as deputy chairperson of the ANC's eThekwini region.

Ntuli was educated at the University of KwaZulu-Natal, where he became active in student politics. In 2004, while in the third year of his Bachelor of Laws degree, he was president of the student representative council on the university's Pietermaritzburg campus. He holds a Master's in political studies from the university.

== Youth politics ==
Around 2008, Ntuli left KwaZulu-Natal for Johannesburg, where he worked at the ANC's headquarters, Luthuli House, for a decade. He worked as an administrator and organiser for both the ANC and its Youth League.

Simultaneously, Ntuli, like his brother, was a member of the Youth League. In 2014, he stood as a candidate for election as provincial chairperson of the KwaZulu-Natal Youth League; his candidacy was endorsed by the leadership of the league's largest region, eThekwini. Later that year, he announced his candidacy for election as secretary of the national Youth League, a more senior position; he ran on a slate aligned to league presidential candidate Pule Mabe. However, neither the provincial league nor the national league went ahead with their leadership elections in 2014; and by the time they were held in 2015, Ntuli was 36, too old to be eligible for Youth League membership. By that time, there were rumours that he was allied with Sihle Zikalala, then the provincial secretary of the ANC in KwaZulu-Natal, and that Zikalala hoped to promote Ntuli to a more senior position in the party or in the KwaZulu-Natal Legislature.

== Provincial politics ==
=== ANC provincial executive: 2015–2017 ===
Ntuli was elected to the Provincial Executive Committee (PEC) of the ANC in KwaZulu-Natal at its seventh elective conference in 2015. He also became the PEC's spokesperson. In May 2016, he was additionally elected as a Member of the KwaZulu-Natal Provincial Legislature, filling a casual vacancy.

He and the other members of the PEC, including Zikalala as chairperson, lost their party positions prematurely in late 2017 when the high court found that electoral irregularities had taken place at the 2015 conference. The PEC was suspended and the running of the provincial party was entrusted to a provincial task team appointed by the ANC National Executive Committee in January 2018; Ntuli was appointed as one of its sixteen members.

=== ANC provincial secretary: 2018–2022 ===
==== Election ====
Ntuli was elected provincial secretary of the ANC in KwaZulu-Natal in July 2018 when, after delays caused by legal challenges, the province held its eighth elective conference to elect a new leadership. Although Ntuli's name was mentioned for the highly contested secretary position, he was not formally nominated in advance and was nominated from the floor of the conference by the ANC Youth League. He won in a vote against Super Zuma, who had been elected to the position in 2015, by a margin of over 200 votes among about 1,700 delegates. He was carried to the podium on the shoulders of supporters when the result was announced. Super Zuma had reportedly been the preferred candidate of controversial former national President Jacob Zuma, who is also from KwaZulu-Natal and whom he had fiercely supported; the Daily Maverick therefore described Ntuli's election as a serious blow to former President Zuma.

At that time, the Daily Maverick said that Ntuli "appears to be very much in the middle of the road between the two main groups [pro-Zuma and anti-Zuma], rather than a diehard supporter of either". The night before the conference opened at Durban University of Technology, Ntuli had addressed a so-called "cadre's forum" with remarks that suggested support for the ANC renewal agenda of incumbent President Cyril Ramaphosa, warning that some people within the ANC would resist the party's renewal. His speech was interpreted as "a veiled attack" on former President Zuma and his supporters in the province, Zandile Gumede and Willies Mchunu.

Ntuli's election was understood to be the result of his inclusion on an informal slate known as the "unity" or "zebra" slate, which had been negotiated between the pro-Zuma and pro-Ramaphosa factions to ensure adequate representation for both. The Mail & Guardian said that Ntuli had become "an obvious choice" for the slot, partly because he was viewed as acceptable by both factions and partly because of the organisational skill he had displayed as a member of the provincial task team. An opposing slate, the so-called "status quo" slate, lobbied for the re-election of the entire disbanded leadership as elected in 2015. Sources told City Press that Ntuli had also been invited, and had declined, to serve as deputy chairperson on the status quo slate, an arrangement that would have allowed Super Zuma to gain the secretary post unopposed. His candidacy received strong support from the province's ANC Youth League, a leading supporter of the unity slate, which had nominated him as part of its campaign for a "generational mix" in the new provincial leadership – Ntuli was still in his 30s at the time. In his opening address to the conference, national ANC secretary-general Ace Magashule had urged young leaders to be patient and allow themselves to be "guided" and "nurtured", which Ntuli's supporters interpreted as directed at Ntuli and described as an attempt to "decampaign" him.

==== Stance on Zuma trial ====
Ntuli served as provincial secretary for a single term between 2018 and 2022, working alongside Zikalala, who was re-elected unopposed as provincial chairperson at the 2018 conference. Throughout his term, one of the KwaZulu-Natal ANC's overriding preoccupations was the ongoing legal challenges faced by former President Zuma, who was charged with corruption and later with contempt of court. The fairly pro-Zuma PEC led by Ntuli resolved that Zuma should participate in the ANC's campaign in KwaZulu-Natal ahead of the 2019 general election; defending the decision, Ntuli said that Zuma "remains a darling of many people in this country, not just in KZN". The PEC also resolved that ANC members should rally outside the courthouse to support Zuma during his trial, though Ntuli told the media that such support did not carry "anti-president" (that is, anti-Ramaphosa) implications.

In May 2021, at the beginning of Zuma's corruption trial, Ntuli accompanied Zikalala to the Pietermaritzburg High Court, where Zikalala assured a crowd of supporters gathered outside that in the provincial ANC "we stand with President Zuma, even today". However, both men were heckled by Zuma's supporters. Zikalala told the Sunday Times that he was conducting an investigation into the identities of the hecklers. He believed that they were not from KwaZulu-Natal and had been "bused in from somewhere outside KwaZulu-Natal to come and boo the KZN leadership... they came in somebody's carrier bags". He suggested that they had been sent from Mpumalanga or the Free State to "create an impression that the leadership of the province is losing the support of its own members" and to destabilise the province.

Zuma's arrest in July 2021 was followed by an episode of civil unrest in KwaZulu-Natal which further divided the party. Ntuli publicly challenged Ramaphosa's characterisation of the unrest as a "failed insurrection", warning that he might be "over-exaggerating". Nonetheless, some perceived Ntuli as an ally of Ramaphosa, and both he and Sikalala (who formerly was unequivocal in his support for Zuma) were viewed as having shifted away from Zuma and towards Ramaphosa. For example, the eThekwini branch apparently believed that they were not willing to challenge the national ANC on its so-called step-aside policy, although Ntuli had in the past expressed misgivings about how the policy was implemented. Zikalala's position was worse than Ntuli's, because he had run for the chairmanship in 2018 on an openly pro-Zuma platform. By August, Ntuli had reportedly been approached to challenge Zikalala for the chairmanship.

==== Dispute with Buthelezi ====
In May 2021, Ntuli got into a public spat with Mangosuthu Buthelezi, a Zulu prince and the former president of the opposition Inkatha Freedom Party (IFP). When Buthelezi claimed that the ANC-led government intended to withdraw the police protection provided to the new Zulu King Misuzulu Zulu, Ntuli accused Buthelezi of lying to score political points; in subsequent exchanges, he said that Buthelezi used his affiliation with the Zulu royal family to "create an impression in society that there is no distinction between the IFP and the Zulu kingdom" and to gain political support on the basis of tribalism.

==== Succession ====
At the KwaZulu-Natal ANC's ninth provincial elective conference in July 2022, Ntuli stood unsuccessfully for a second term as provincial secretary. He ran against Bheki Mtolo, who was then the mayor of Kokstad and who ran on the so-called Taliban slate, which was pro-Zuma and which also successfully installed Siboniso Duma as provincial chairperson, ousting Zikalala. A source later told the Daily Maverick that the faction backing the Taliban had first approached Ntuli to run against Zikalala as chairperson. Ntuli said the same in November, explaining that he had denied the offer for principled reasons, because "there was no valid reason to remove Zikalala". Instead, Ntuli was widely perceived to have run on – and even to have co-led – the same slate as Zikalala. Zikalala's slate was understood to support the re-election of Cyril Ramaphosa as national ANC president and was known as the Ankole slate, after the cattle breed for which Ramaphosa had a penchant. Thus when the conference began on 22 July, pro-Zuma delegates heckled Ntuli and Zikalala. However, in November, Ntuli denied that he had been associated with the Ankoles, saying that he challenged Ramaphosa both publicly and privately on various issues.

At the conference, Ntuli lost the election, winning 894 votes to Mtolo's 699. He was nonetheless re-elected to the PEC for another term.

== National politics ==
=== ANC secretary-general bid: 2022 ===
In 2022, ahead of the ANC's 55th National Conference in December, Ntuli launched a campaign to be elected secretary-general of the national ANC, one of the party's so-called Top Six positions. His campaign platform includes proposals to have both the party's secretary-general and its treasurer-general sit in the cabinet of the national government; he would achieve this by appointing a second secretary-general and making the treasurer-general a part-time position.

In October, Ramaphosa's presidential campaign appeared to endorse a slate of Top Six candidates which excluded Ntuli. Ramaphosa was perceived to have "dumped" Ntuli for Fikile Mbalula, and Ntuli's campaigners told Africa Report that they felt "snubbed". However, Ntuli said that it was an advantage not to be aligned to any slate, because he would run on personal merit and would not be "beholden to any faction". In November, he said that he would work under any ANC president and would not comment on his preferred presidential candidate. His candidacy received few endorsements not only on the national but also on the provincial and regional levels: none of the nine PECs announced support for him. His own PEC in KwaZulu-Natal endorsed Phumulo Masualle, the former Premier of the Eastern Cape, for secretary general; he described its stance as "baffling". Eyewitness News reported that he was at odds with the rest of the PEC partly because he had declined to run against Zikalala in July. Only two of eleven regions in KwaZulu-Natal supported his bid, and he was not endorsed by the national leadership of the ANC Youth League.

However, when the ANC's Electoral Committee announced its consolidated nominations list on 22 November, Ntuli was the frontrunner for the secretary-general position, having earned the most nominations of any candidate, including from 241 branches in KwaZulu-Natal. Eyewitness News suggested that Ntuli was secretly supported – in particular in acquiring media connections – by allies of Gauteng's Paul Mashatile. Ntuli denied this.

On 19 December 2022, Ntuli lost the race to Mbalula, who received 1,692 votes (39 per cent) against Masualle's 1,590 (36 per cent) and Ntuli's 1,080 (25 per cent). However, he was elected to a five-year term as an ordinary member of the party's National Executive Committee; by popularity, he was ranked fourth of the 80 candidates elected, receiving 2,075 votes across the 4,029 ballots cast in total. Initially touted as a possible candidate for the position of ANC national spokesman, he was appointed by the National Executive Committee as the party's head of elections, an important role in the run-up to the May 2024 general election. He was also elected to the party's National Working Committee.

=== National Assembly: 2024–present ===
In March 2024, the ANC announced that Ntuli would stand as a candidate in the upcoming general election, ranked 32nd on the party's national list. Pursuant to the election, he was sworn in as a member of the National Assembly, the lower house of the South African Parliament, on 14 June.
