= David Sipunzi =

David Sipunzi (06 December 1960 – 25 December 2020) was a South African trade unionist.

Born in Willowvale in the Eastern Cape region, Sipunzi moved to the Orange Free State in 1985, to work in a platinum mine run by Welkom. He joined the National Union of Mineworkers, and soon rose to become shaft secretary, then branch secretary, and then regional deputy secretary.

In 1999, Sipunzi was elected as the Free State regional secretary of the union. While in the role, he asked the union's general secretary, Gwede Mantashe, to mentor him, and Mantashe later became one of his leading supporters. Sipunzi challenged for the post of deputy general secretary of the union in 2012, but was not elected.

In 2015, Sipunzi stood to become general secretary of the union, and defeated the incumbent, Frans Baleni, by 357 votes to 345. As leader of the union, he argued for the readmission of Zwelinzima Vavi and the National Union of Metalworkers of South Africa to the Congress of South African Trade Unions. He also argued for co-operation with the rival Association of Mineworkers and Construction Union on matters of common interest, such as wage increases.

Sipunzi also served as a vice-president of the World Federation of Trade Unions. He died in 2020, while still in office.

Trade union offices
Preceded by Frans Baleni	General Secretary of the National Union of Mineworkers; 2015–2020	Succeeded by William Mabapa
