= Cassius Lubisi =

South African educationist and civil servant

Director-General of the Presidency of South Africa
- In office 1 November 2010 – 31 August 2020
- President: Jacob Zuma; Cyril Ramaphosa
- Preceded by: Vusi Mavimbela
- Succeeded by: Phindile Baleni

Personal details
- Born: Cassius Reginald Lubisi; 1955 or 1956 (age 69–70) Transvaal, Union of South Africa
- Education: Inkamana High School
- Alma mater: University of Natal; University of Nottingham

Cassius Reginald Lubisi (born 1955 or 1956) is a South African educationist and civil servant. He was the director-general of the Presidency of South Africa between November 2010 and September 2020 under Presidents Jacob Zuma and Cyril Ramaphosa. In November 2021, he was appointed as the chairperson of the Human Sciences Research Council.

Lubisi entered government in the education sector, serving stints as chairperson of Umalusi from 2002 to 2004, as a special advisor and deputy director-general in the national Department of Education from 2003 to 2004, and as head of the KwaZulu-Natal Department of Education from 2005 to 2010. Before that, he was a lecturer at the University of Natal.

== Early life and education ==
Lubisi was born in 1955 or 1956 in present-day Mpumalanga. One of seven siblings, he was raised by a single mother. He attended primary school in Nelspruit but matriculated at the Inkamana High School in Vryheid, KwaZulu-Natal. Thereafter he studied at the Pietermaritzburg campus of the University of Natal, completing a Bachelor of Science, a Bachelor of Education cum laude, and a Higher Diploma in Education.

In 2000, Lubisi completed his doctoral degree at the University of Nottingham in Nottingham, England, with a dissertation about classroom assessment by South African mathematics teachers.

== Career in education ==
In 1993, Lubisi began his career as a lecturer at the University of Natal's Pietermaritzburg campus, where he worked for the next ten years. From 2002 to 2003, on secondment from the university, he chaired the Ministerial Project Committee that developed South Africa's National Curriculum Statement for Grades 10 to 12. At the same time, he was the chairperson of Umalusi from June 2002 to May 2004, and in 2003 he was additionally appointed as a special advisor to the national Minister of Education, Kader Asmal.

After leaving Umalusi in 2004, Lubisi began a brief stint as Deputy Director-General for General Education and Training in the national Department of Education. Then, from June 2005 to October 2010, he worked in the Government of KwaZulu-Natal as head and superintendent-general of the provincial Department of Education. He commissioned a Special Investigation Unit investigation into procurement irregularities in the provincial department in 2006, but the South African Democratic Teachers Union later accused him of having failed to prevent corruption in the department.

== Director-General in the Presidency: 2010–2020 ==
On 1 October 2010, Lubisi announced that he would leave the provincial education department to replace Vusi Mavimbela as director-general of the Presidency of South Africa, with effect from 1 November 2010. In that capacity he was also the secretary of cabinet and chairperson of the Forum of South African Directors-General. Appointed during the first term of President Jacob Zuma, he remained in the position after President Cyril Ramaphosa was elected to succeed Zuma in February 2018. In 2019 Richard Calland described him as "a solid, decent senior official, but not a political rottweiler".

He retired from the Presidency in September 2020. Phindile Baleni was appointed to replace him as director-general in March 2021.

== Retirement ==
Lubisi was appointed as a member of the Armscor board in December 2020, as chairperson of professional services firm Morar Incorporated in April 2021, and as chairperson of the Human Sciences Research Council on 1 November 2021. In March 2022, Minister Ebrahim Patel appointed him to a year-long term on the board of the National Lotteries Commission.

In May 2023, the KwaZulu-Natal government announced that Lubisi would lead a provincial government intervention in eThekwini Metropolitan Municipality under Section 154 of the Constitution, which permits such interventions in dysfunctional municipalities. The intervention was initially hamstrung by local political resistance, but it was re-appointed afresh – still under Lubisi and his co-chair Mike Sutcliffe – in July 2024.

== Personal life ==
He is married to Lumka Lubisi, with whom he has one adult son. The couple also adopted Lubisi's niece.
