= Alfred Msezane =

South African physicist and academic (born 1938)

Alfred Zakhele Msezane
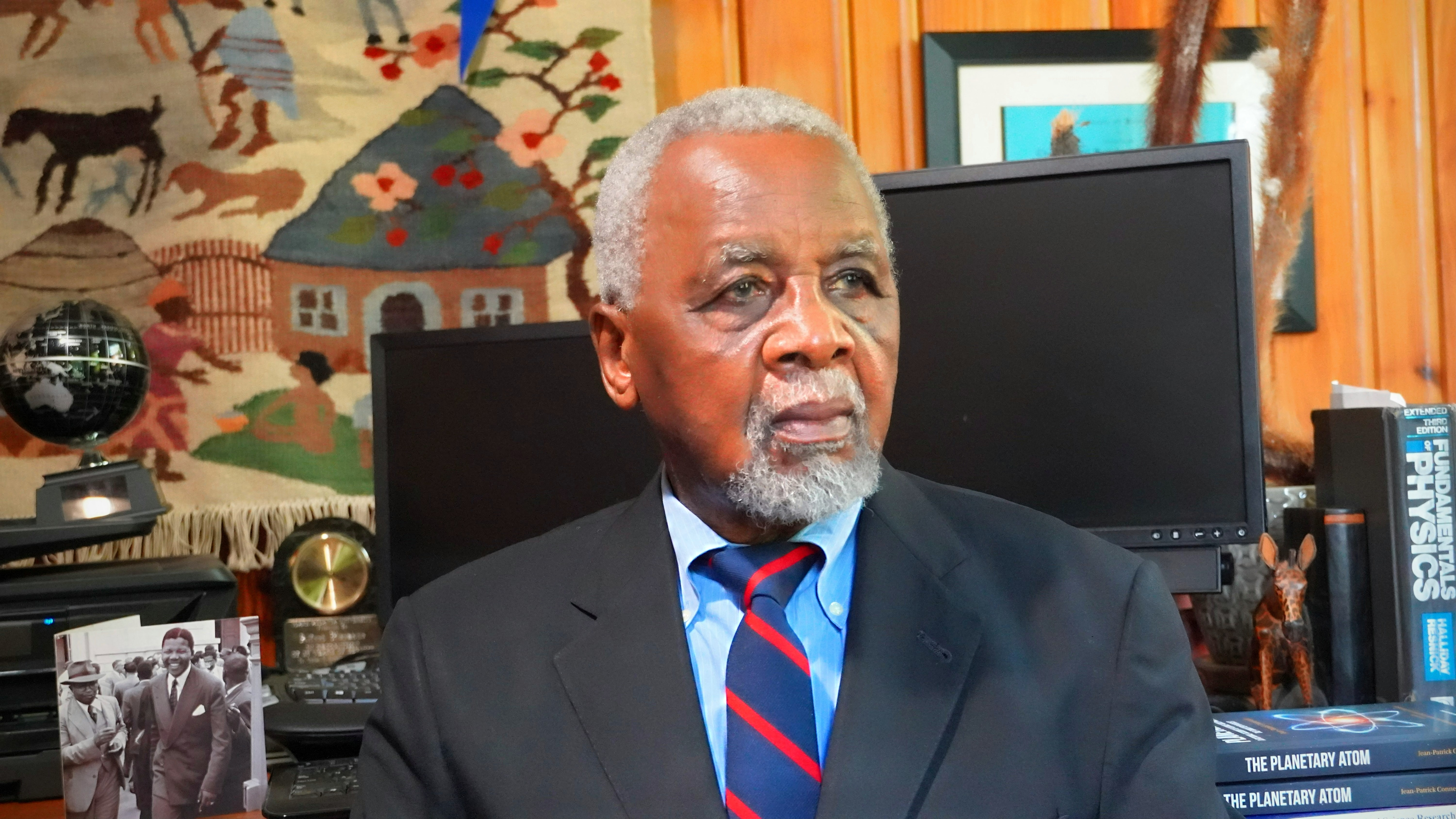
- Born: 31 December 1938 (age 87)
- Education: University of Fort Hare University of Saskatchewan University of Western Ontario
- Occupations: Physicist and academic
- Scientific career
- Fields: Physics
- Workplaces: Morehouse College Clark Atlanta University

Alfred Zakhele Msezane (born 31 December 1938) is a South African physicist. He is a professor in the Department of Physics at Clark Atlanta University, and the Founding Director of the Center for Theoretical Studies of Physical Systems. His research is primarily in theoretical atomic physics and condensed matter theory. He also carries out research in mathematical physics, and image processing.

== Early life and education ==
Msezane was born in Springs, South Africa, on 31 December 1938, into a Zulu family. His father, Albert Msezane, was from Piet Retief, while his mother was from eSwatini (formerly Swaziland). Msezane lived on a farm with his grandmother and worked as a shepherd. In search of better opportunities, his parents moved to Johannesburg, where they raised him and his brother, Richard, and managed a successful livestock trading business.

In his early schooling in St. Louis Catholic School, Msezane already demonstrated an interest and aptitude in mathematics. He attended Thlakula school from grades seven to nine, and graduated from Inkamana high school in 1959. Due to apartheid policies, he was not able to enrol in any White-only university. Instead, with a Rotary International Scholarship, he enrolled in University of Fort Hare in 1960 and obtained a B.Sc.-Honours degree in physics in 1965. In the same year, he accepted a World University Scholarship to pursue a Ph.D. at University of Saskatchewan in Canada, where he research focus was on the structure of the deuteron.

After obtaining his M.Sc. in theoretical nuclear physics in 1968, Msezane returned to Johannesburg to complete his doctoral degree at University of the Witwatersrand. His research was interrupted by apartheid policies, and he had to return to Canada in 1969 to write his dissertation on collision theory at the University of Western Ontario. There, he married Gail P. Msezane, whom he had met at the University of Saskatchewan. He obtained his Ph.D. in physics in 1974.

== Career ==
After spending a year at the University of Western Ontario learning and implementing Modular Teaching to physics students, Msezane moved to Georgia State University in 1974 for his postdoctoral research. He became a college instructor and researcher at the University of New Brunswick in 1976. He served as a visiting professor at Louisiana State University from 1978 to 1980, and joined the faculty of Morehouse College as an assistant professor of physics in 1980; he was promoted to associate Professor in 1982. In 1983, Msezane became professor and served as chair of the physics department from 1986 to 1989 at Atlanta University, which was merged with Clark College in 1988 to become Clark Atlanta University.

== Research ==
Msezane has published more than 480 physics research papers and given more than 420 presentations at national and international conferences. He carries out research in theoretical atomic and molecular physics, mathematical physics, condensed matter physics, and image processing. Msezane developed a fundamental theory to better understand negative ion formation in complex heavy systems and applied it to negative ion catalysis.

He is the founding director of the Center for Theoretical Studies of Physical Systems (CTSPS) at Clark Atlanta University, which was established in 1991 through an approximately 5 million dollar grant by the NSF which was further renewed at the same funding level in 1996. The center focuses on low-energy scattering theory, solid-state theory, image processing and mathematical physics theory.

=== Awards and honors ===
Msezane's awards and honors include:

- 1965: World University Service Scholarship, University of Saskatchewan
- 1998: Honorary Doctorate of Science degree from the University of Fort Hare (South Africa)
- 1999: Fellow of the American Physical Society and Life Member.
- 1999: Edward A. Bouchet Award of the American Physical Society
- 2011: Fellow of the American Association for the Advancement of Science
- 2016: Fellow of the Royal Society of Chemistry
- 2011: Fellow of the Institute of Physics, London, UK
- Fellow of the National Society of Black Physicists
- 2020: Fellow of the African Scientific Institute
