= Phindile Baleni =

South African civil servant

Director-General of the Presidency of South Africa
- Incumbent
- Assumed office 1 April 2021
- President: Cyril Ramaphosa
- Preceded by: Cassius Lubisi

Personal details
- Born: Phindile Nzimande; 1966 or 1967 (age 58–59) Soweto, South Africa
- Spouse: Frans Baleni
- Education: University of the Witwatersrand

Phindile Baleni (née Nzimande; born 1966 or 1967) is a South African lawyer and civil servant who has been the director-general of the Presidency of South Africa since April 2021. She was formerly the director-general in the office of the Premier of Gauteng, David Makhura, from 2015 to 2021. Before that, she was the chief executive officer of the National Energy Regulator of South Africa from 2011 to 2015.

== Early life and career ==
Baleni was born in 1966 or 1967 in Soweto, and she grew up in Katlehong on the East Rand. She attended high school in the nearby township of Vosloorus, matriculating at age sixteen. Thereafter she studied law at the University of the Witwatersrand, where she completed a B.Proc and LLB.

She began her career as a candidate attorney at Wright Rose-Innes in Germiston and she remained at the firm as a professional assistant after she was admitted as an attorney and conveyancer. In 1993 she became a partner at Tiego Moseneke's law firm, Moseneke and Partners.

== Career in public service ==
In 1994, shortly after South Africa's first post-apartheid elections, Baleni joined the new Government of Gauteng as a special legal adviser to the newly appointed provincial minister for local government and housing, Dan Mofokeng. In late 1996, she left the provincial government to join the City of Johannesburg Metropolitan Municipality, where she became an executive officer for local government policy. She ultimately became the executive director of the city's contract management unit.

In July 2003, Baleni joined the energy sector as chief executive officer of Electricity Distribution Industry Holdings, an organisation established by the Department of Minerals and Energy to oversee the establishment of six regional electricity distributors. On 1 May 2011, she took office as chief executive officer of the National Energy Regulator of South Africa (NERSA). Shortly afterwards, Minister Blade Nzimande additionally appointed her as chairperson of the Manufacturing, Engineering and Related Services Seta.

She remained at NERSA until February 2015, when she announced that she was resigning in order to return to the Gauteng Government, now as director-general in the office of the Premier of Gauteng, David Makhura. She joined Makhura's office in March 2015.

=== Presidency of South Africa: 2021–present ===
On 31 March 2021, Baleni announced her departure from Gauteng to become director-general in the Presidency of South Africa, a position which also carries the responsibilities of cabinet secretary and head of public administration. She had been viewed as a frontrunner for the position since the retirement of the former incumbent, Cassius Lubisi, in September 2020. Appointed by President Cyril Ramaphosa, she was the first woman to hold the office.

In November 2022, Baleni's contract was extended by five years, and in April 2024 President Ramaphosa appointed her and Mike Mabuyakhulu to head a task team to resolve inefficiencies at the Port of Durban. However, the Mail & Guardian reported that she had a tense relationship with Ramaphosa's chief of staff, Roshene Singh, and she reportedly received death threats related to the Presidency's processing of the Zondo Commission report on state capture.

== Personal life ==
Baleni has one child. She is married to trade unionist Frans Baleni, a former general secretary of the National Union of Mineworkers.
