= Inkamana High School =

Coordinates: 27.81997°S 30.81317°E

Inkamana Private Secondary
- Vryheid, KwaZulu-Natal; South Africa

Information
- Type: Private, Boarding
- Motto: Ausculta
- Established: 1923; 103 years ago
- Headmistress/Umphathi: Isabel Fourie
- Grades: Grade 8-12
- Enrollment: 100 boys and 100 girls
- Campus type: Secluded
- Colors: Green and White
- School fees: R 40 000 (boarding)
- Website: www.inkamana.co.za

Inkamana High School is in Vryheid, Kwazulu Natal, South Africa. It was started in 1923 and had 200 boarding students in 2009.

== History ==
Inkamana is recognised as a historic school. It is situated in the heart of the Zululand. Inkamana High School was started 2 February 1923 as an intermediate School with only one class of grade 5 by Benedictine Missionaries from the Benedictine Congregation of St. Ottilien in Germany. The school had fifteen pupils, four boys and eleven girls, all from Vryheid and the Paulpietersburg district. They were all boarders at Inkamana. They paid sixpence a month for school fees and brought farm and garden products to pay for their boarding accommodation.

A Roman Catholic Missionary School, was founded in 1923.

The first Junior Certificate Examination was held at Inkamana in November 1934. The Senior Certificate course at Inkamana began in 1935 and a year later four pupils were preparing for their graduation. However, three of them left. The only remaining student, Ulrica Dzivane, successfully wrote her Senior Certificate Examination in Nov. 1936. Since then the Senior Certificate results have gained for Inkamana the reputation of being one of the best schools in the country. The failure rate was always low.

== Today ==
Presently the student enrolment is 200 with one class for each grade.

This co-educational boarding school is part of, and located within, Inkamana Abbey in the Abaqulusi region of KwaZulu Natal Province. There is a monastery, church, farm and other related activities as part of the location.

In 2007 Inkamana was amongst several schools recognised as "historic schools". Funding of six million rand a year was earmarked for Adams College, Inkamana High School, Ohlange High School, Inanda Seminary and Vryheid Comprehensive High School to make them academies focussing on Maths, Science and Technology. Anglican Archbishop Emeritus Njongonkulu Ndungane has said that they still need funds and "little has been achieved since democracy".

== Alumni ==
- Oswald Mbuyiseni Mtshali, poet
- Gabriel Ndabandaba, Member of Parliament
- Zanele Mbeki, former RSA first lady
- Cassius Lubisi, Director-General and Secretary to Cabinet: RSA
- Dr Malibongwe Mthethwa first black person to own a private hospital in kzn(nongoma private hospital)
- Dr Fabian Ribeiro – (Medical doctor and Political Activist – He was murdered by Apartheid Agents)
- Mrs Florence Ribeiro (uKaMathe was a Political Activist – She was murdered with her husband (whom she met at Inkamana) by Apartheid Agents.
- Dr Mavuso Msimang – Secretary to Oliver Reginald Tambo
- Zuzifa Buthelezi (Director: Mazibuye Investments. Inkosi Mangosuthu Buthelezi)
- Alfred Msezane (Professor of physics, Clark Atlanta University)
