= Judith Tshabalala =

South African politician (born 1982)

The Honourable Judith Tshabalala MP

Deputy Minister of Employment and Labour
- Incumbent
- Assumed office 3 July 2024 Serving with Jomo Sibiya
- President: Cyril Ramaphosa
- Preceded by: Phumzile Mgcina

Deputy Minister of Water and Sanitation
- In office 7 March 2023 – 3 July 2024 Serving with David Mahlobo
- President: Cyril Ramaphosa
- Preceded by: Dikeledi Magadzi
- Succeeded by: Sello Seitlholo

Personal details
- Born: 30 March 1982 (age 44)
- Party: African National Congress
- Profession: Politician

Judith Tshabalala (born 30 March 1982) is a South African politician from Gauteng. A member of the African National Congress, she has been the Deputy Minister of Employment and Labour since July 2024. She was formerly the Deputy Minister of Water and Sanitation from March 2023 to July 2024.

Tshabalala has served as a Member of the National Assembly of South Africa since 2019, and previously from 2011 to 2014. She is a member of the African National Congress.

== Parliamentary career ==
Tshabalala is a member of the African National Congress. She entered the National Assembly of South Africa on 19 October 2011 as a replacement for Noluthando Mayende-Sibiya. During her first term, she was assigned to both the Standing Committee on Finance and the Portfolio Committee on Arts and Culture. In July 2013, she became a member of the ad hoc committee on the Appointment of the Auditor General. She was not elected to a full term in the 2014 general election, as she was ranked low on the ANC's regional-to-national list.

In May 2019, Tshabalala was elected to return to the National Assembly. From June 2019, she was a member of the Portfolio Committee on Public Enterprises.

== National government ==
In a cabinet reshuffle on 6 March 2023, Tshabalala was appointed Deputy Minister of Water and Sanitation by president Cyril Ramaphosa. She replaced Dikeledi Magadzi who was dismissed from government.

== Personal life ==
In February 2020, Tshabalala was hijacked at her home in Sebokeng. She was then taken hostage and dropped off unharmed in Eden Park, Alberton.
