= Nombuso Mtolo =

South African politician (born 1981)

The Honourable Nombuso Mtolo

Member of the National Assembly

Assembly Member for KwaZulu-Natal
- Incumbent
- Assumed office 14 June 2024

Personal details
- Born: 6 September 1981 (age 44)
- Party: African National Congress
- Spouse: Bheki Mtolo

Nombuso Elizabeth Mtolo (born 6 September 1981) is South African politician from KwaZulu-Natal who has represented the African National Congress (ANC) in the National Assembly since June 2024. She was elected to her seat in the May 2024 general election, ranked fourth on the ANC's party list in KwaZulu-Natal, and sits on the Portfolio Committee on Home Affairs.

She was elected to the National Executive Committee of the ANC Women's League in January 2023, ranked 22nd of the 40 candidates elected.

She is married to ANC politician Bheki Mtolo.
