= Bheki Ntuli (eThekwini politician) =

South African politician

Regional Secretary of the African National Congress in eThekwini
- In office December 2015 – June 2019
- Deputy: Mondli Mthembu
- Chairperson: Zandile Gumede
- Preceded by: Bheki Ntshangase
- Succeeded by: Musa Nciki

Personal details
- Citizenship: South Africa
- Party: African National Congress
- Relations: Mdumiseni Ntuli (nephew); Thembo Ntuli (nephew)

Bheki Ntuli is a South African politician who is active in the African National Congress (ANC) of KwaZulu-Natal. He is known for his tenure as Regional Secretary of the ANC's eThekwini branch, an office he held from 2015 to 2019. He subsequently led the branch as its interim coordinator from 2020 until 2022, when he was voted out of the leadership by allies of Zandile Gumede. In July 2022, he was elected to a four-year term on the Provincial Executive Committee of the ANC's KwaZulu-Natal branch.

== Political career ==
Ntuli rose to prominence through his activities in the eThekwini branch of the ANC, the party's largest in the country; he was a member of the ANC Regional Executive Committee in eThekwini as early as 2012. In December 2015, he was elected Regional Secretary of the eThekwini ANC, a full-time position; he served under Regional Chairperson Zandile Gumede, who subsequently became Mayor of eThekwini. By 2018, it was widely reported that Ntuli and Gumede had a tense relationship, and Ntuli was touted as a possible successor to Gumede.

At the same time, the opposition Democratic Alliance alleged that Ntuli was attempting "to control the city from Commercial City [ANC regional headquarters]". In December 2016, the party claimed that he was attempting to influence employment processes at eThekwini Metropolitan Municipality; it also said that Ntuli frequently attended meetings of the ANC's caucus in the council, despite not holding any public position in the council. Ntuli also caused a minor scandal in September 2017 when a video of his bodyguards – filmed brandishing guns and threatening to kill somebody – went viral on social media; the bodyguards were subsequently fired.

=== Interim task team ===
In 2019, the ANC Provincial Executive Committee in KwaZulu-Natal removed Ntuli, Gumede, and the other regional leaders from office on the grounds that they had exceeded their three-year term. However, Ntuli was appointed to the interim task team that was formed to lead the regional branch until new leadership elections could be held; he was appointed deputy coordinator, serving under coordinator Mluleki Ndobe, and he took over as coordinator after Ndobe died in 2020.

=== Re-election bid ===
As the elections approached, Ntuli campaigned to be re-elected as Regional Secretary, aligning himself with a slate of candidates headed by Thabani Nyawose, who would run against Gumede for the chairmanship. Nyawose's slate was aligned to ANC President Cyril Ramaphosa, whereas Gumede's slate was associated with supporters of former President Jacob Zuma. The Sunday Times reported that Ntuli was additionally developing a fledgling alliance with ANC Treasurer-General Paul Mashatile.

However, when the conference was held in April 2022, Nyawose lost to Gumede and Ntuli lost to Musa Nciki, Gumede's running mate; he received 174 votes against the 217 received by Nciki. Nonetheless, in July 2022, Ntuli was elected to a four-year term on the Provincial Executive Committee of the ANC's KwaZulu-Natal branch.

== Personal life ==
Ntuli's family, from KwaXimba near Cato Ridge, is known to be influential in the KwaZulu-Natal ANC. His nephews are Thembo Ntuli – who was elected deputy chair of the eThekwini ANC on Gumede's slate in 2022 – and Mdumiseni Ntuli.
