= MTO =

MTO may refer to:

== Arts and entertainment ==
- Mario Tennis Open, a 2012 tennis game for the Nintendo 3DS
- MTO, French mural and graffiti artist, film maker

== Economics ==
- Make to order or made to order, a production approach where products are not built until a confirmed order for products is received
- Medium-Term budgetary Objective, part of the Stability and Growth Pact (SGP) agreement between member states of the European Union

== Organizations ==
- Media Take Out, an African-American celebrity gossip website
- Ministry of Transportation (Ontario), a ministry of the government of Ontario
- Motor Tax Office, a type of government agency comparable to a Department of Motor Vehicles
- MTO (video game company), a Yokohama-based video game developer and publisher founded in May 1996
- Munger, Tolles & Olson, a law firm based in California
- Music Theory Online, the online journal of the Society for Music Theory

== Science and technology ==
=== Materials ===
- Material take off, an engineering and design term
- Methanol to olefins, a technology for generating polymer precursors from methanol
- Methylrhenium trioxide, also called methyltrioxorhenium

=== Spaceflight ===
- Mars Telecommunications Orbiter, a cancelled Mars mission to enhance communications between Earth and spacecraft on or near Mars
- Mars transfer orbit, also known as trans-Mars injection, a spacecraft maneuver to achieve a trajectory to Mars

== Transportation ==
- MTO, IATA code for Coles County Memorial Airport in Mattoon-Charleston, Illinois
- MTO, National Rail station code for Marton railway station (Middlesbrough), in England
- Multimodal transport operator, an enterprise which moves goods using more than one type of transportation

== Other uses ==
- Mediterranean Theater of Operations, a World War II area designation
- mto, ISO 639-3 code for the Totontepec Mixe language
