= Tyotyo James =

South African politician (b. 1958)

Tyotyo James MP

Chairperson of the Portfolio Committee on Public Service and Administration, Performance Monitoring & Evaluation
- In office 2 July 2019 – 14 October 2023
- Preceded by: Joe Maswanganyi

Member of the National Assembly of South Africa
- In office 22 May 2019 – 14 October 2023

Personal details
- Born: Tyotyo Hubert James; 1958 (age 67–68)
- Party: African National Congress
- Profession: Politician

Tyotyo Hubert James (born 1958) is a South African politician and trade union leader who was the Chairperson of the Portfolio Committee on Public Service and Administration, Performance Monitoring & Evaluation and a Member of the National Assembly for the African National Congress (ANC) from 2018 until 2023. He had previously served as the first deputy president of the Congress of South African Trade Unions (COSATU).

== Political career ==
As a trade union leader, he was involved with the National Union of Mineworkers in the Free State province. He is a former board member of the Immigration Advisory Board and a former board member of the TransCaledon Tunnel Authority. James served as the first deputy president of the Congress of South African Trade Unions (COSATU) until 2018. James supported Cyril Ramaphosa's candidacy for ANC president in 2017. Ramaphosa was elected at the ANC's elective conference in December 2017 and became president of South Africa in February 2018.

James was elected to the National Assembly in the 2019 parliamentary elections as a member of the African National Congress. He was then elected as Chairperson of the Portfolio Committee on Public Service and Administration, Performance Monitoring & Evaluation.

James lost his parliamentary membership in accordance to section 47(3)(b) of the Constitution on 14 October 2023.

Trade union offices
Preceded by Sidumo Dlamini	First Deputy President of the Congress of South African Trade Unions; 2009–2018	Succeeded by Mike Shingange
