= Bheki Lubisi =

South African politician (1986–2023)

Bheki Lubisi MPL

Member of the Mpumalanga Provincial Legislature
- In office 22 May 2019 – 10 April 2023

Personal details
- Born: 24 September 1986
- Died: 10 April 2023 (aged 36)
- Citizenship: South Africa
- Party: African National Congress

Bhekithemba Maxwell Lubisi (24 September 1986 – 10 April 2023) was a South African politician who represented the African National Congress (ANC) in the Mpumalanga Provincial Legislature since 2019 until his death on 10 April 2023. He was elected to his seat in the 2019 general election, ranked 20th on the ANC's party list. At the time of his death, Lubisi served as chairperson of the legislature's Select Committee on Public Participation & Petitions as well as the Portfolio Committee on Agriculture, Rural Development, Land and Environmental Affairs.

He was born in the agricultural rich Nkomazi area of Mpumalanga province on 24 September 1986. At the time of his election to the legislature, he chaired the ANC Youth League's large regional branch in Ehlanzeni, having been elected to a third term in the position at a chaotic league elective conference in June 2018. Earlier in his tenure, in July 2015, he appeared in the Boschfontein Periodical Court on a murder charge, accused with two others of having fatally assaulted a suspected robber.
