= Classroom Assessment Techniques =

Classroom Assessment Techniques, also referred to as CATs, are strategies educators use to gauge how well students are comprehending key points during a lesson or a course. The techniques are meant to be a type of formative assessment that also allow teachers to make adjustments to a lesson based on students' needs. CATs are most commonly ungraded, unanimous, and are conducted during class time.

== Background ==
The incorporation of classroom assessment techniques is an age-old concept which teachers have been using and practicing for years. Whether a teacher uses a technique learned in training, or simply a strategy conjured up on their own, teachers need to know if their methods are successful and many feel that the desire to understand students' comprehension is instinctive. Despite this innate characteristic among teachers, the first real attempt to document such techniques for teachers didn't appear until 1988, when K. Patricia Cross and Thomas A. Angelo published “Classroom Assessment Techniques: A Handbook for Faculty”.

== Benefits for teachers ==
By using feedback attained through CATs, teachers gain insight into which concepts their students understand the best and which ones are most confusing. They can then use this information to decide when there needs to be more instruction, and when the class is ready to move on to the next topic. In this way, teachers are able to meet the needs of their students most effectively. These techniques can also help teachers understand the ways their students learn the best, as well as alert teachers when a certain teaching approach is not working very well. Other benefits include flexibility and timeliness. Many of the techniques, although not all, can be used in a variety of ways. They can be adapted to fit large or small class sizes, or modified depending on what subject matter is being taught; they can be used to assess students' recall or critical thinking skills. Also, CATs require very little time, if any, to be set aside - most of the activities can be conducted during regular instruction time.

== Benefits for students ==
Classroom Assessment Techniques allow students a chance to see how they are progressing over time. Along with that, it shows students that their feedback can make a difference in what and how they learn, which in turn could lead students to take more ownership of their education. Students have reported that they feel more involved in the learning process when these techniques are used in the classroom because it requires them to focus on what they're learning – they become active participants rather than passive learners. The integration of CATs in the classroom can also serve as an example for how learning is an ongoing, highly adaptable process.

== Examples ==
=== Background Knowledge Probe ===
The Background Knowledge Probe consists of a few simple questions (and perhaps a couple focused ones) asked typically before the start of a unit or when introducing a new important topic. The purpose of this questionnaire is to inform the teacher of how much prior knowledge students have on a specific subject matter. This will help the teacher figure out an effective starting point for the lesson as well as an appropriate level of instruction. While this strategy is most often used as an introduction to a lesson, it can also be beneficial halfway through and at the end to see what the students have learned. This particular technique can be easily modified to fit any subject matter – history, science, math, English, music, and so on. For example, a question that might be found on a Background Knowledge Probe questionnaire would be: "Explain what you know about the Louisiana Purchase."

=== Traffic Light Cards ===
The teacher distributes one red card and one green card to each student. Then, during the lesson while instruction is taking place, students can hold up either card to show how well they understand. If the teacher sees his or her students holding up all green cards, they know to continue their lesson. If the students are holding up red cards, the teacher knows that something was unclear and needs to be discussed further. This type of immediate feedback is helpful for the teacher to see how well students are learning, and it also gives the students an opportunity to engage and take control of their learning. This technique is typically practiced in elementary classrooms, although it can also be effective at the middle school and high school grade levels.

Another version of traffic light card has been recently developed in higher education. A few minutes before the end of lecture, students “traffic light” given topics on a notecard, in which their understanding is high (green), partial (yellow), or low (red). The results are used by the instructors to give appropriate review in the next lecture and help students gain better understanding in the content.

=== Muddiest Point ===
The Muddiest Point is another general CAT that can be used for any subject in any grade level. When using this technique, the teacher instructs students to briefly state what part of the lesson or assignment was most confusing for them. This allows the teacher to figure out which areas need to be reiterated. Reviewing every area that each student felt was unclear is a lot of work, and teachers may find themselves simply teaching the entire lesson all over again. As an alternative, teachers should focus on the top two or three most common responses. This technique also requires students to learn how to articulate their confusion, a useful skill.

=== What’s the Principle? ===
This method is effective in courses that call for problem-solving. Students determine the nature of the problem and decide on the theory to apply.

=== Problem Recognition Task ===
The rationale is to pinpoint issues that can be solved effectively using teaching methods in the classroom. The students must name the technique that suits the problem without solving said concern.

=== Student Generated Test Questions ===
These questions may be utilized one or two weeks before an examination. The teacher writes broad guidelines about the types of questions for the tests and shares them with students so they can answer at least one or two of these questions expected to appear on the actual exams.

=== Classroom Opinion Polls ===
The teacher formulates brief two up to four items of questionnaires in helping find out opinions of students about issues related to the course.

=== Memory Matrix ===
This is a fundamental two-dimensional illustration or table. The rectangle is divided into rows and columns to systematize information as well as define relationships. It helps evaluate the students’ recollection of vital course content and skills in organizing information into different categories the teacher supplies.
