= Bheki Mtolo =

South African politician

Provincial Secretary of the African National Congress in KwaZulu-Natal
- Incumbent
- Assumed office 24 July 2022
- Deputy: Sipho Hlomuka
- Chairperson: Siboniso Duma
- Preceded by: Mdumiseni Ntuli

Mayor of Greater Kokstad
- In office May 2011 – 31 August 2022
- Deputy: Karen Walker
- Preceded by: Nosisa Jojozi
- Succeeded by: Lwando Madikizela

Personal details
- Born: Natal, South Africa
- Party: African National Congress
- Spouse: Nombuso Mtolo

Bhekinkosi Michael Mtolo is a South African politician who has served as the Provincial Secretary of the African National Congress (ANC) in KwaZulu-Natal since July 2022. He was formerly the Mayor of Greater Kokstad Local Municipality from 2016 to 2022, after serving a term as Deputy Mayor from 2011 to 2016. He rose to prominence as the Provincial Secretary of the ANC Youth League in KwaZulu-Natal, an office he held until October 2011.

== Early life and activism ==
Mtolo is from the south west of present-day KwaZulu-Natal (formerly the Natal province). During apartheid, he was reportedly involved in the African National Congress (ANC) underground, where he worked with Zweli Mkhize.

== ANCYL Provincial Secretary ==
By 2010, Mtolo was the Provincial Secretary of the KwaZulu-Natal branch of the ANC Youth League (ANCYL), serving under Provincial Chairperson Mxolisi Kaunda. At the provincial league's next elective conference, held at the University of KwaZulu-Natal in late May 2010, he stood for re-election as Provincial Secretary and narrowly won against Wandile Mkhize. He was viewed as the leader of a slate of candidates, contesting against an opposing slate led by Mkhize and Nomagugu Simelane-Zulu, which, at the same conference, installed Mthandeni Dlungwana as ANCYL Provincial Chairperson and Siboniso Duma as Mtolo's deputy. After the election results were announced, opponents of Mtolo's slate staged a walkout from the conference, claiming that there had been electoral irregularities.

While Mtolo was in the secretariat, the national ANCYL President, Julius Malema, fell out with the ANC President, Jacob Zuma, and was subject to controversial disciplinary proceedings within the party. In 2011, it was widely reported that the situation had caused a split in the KwaZulu-Natal ANCYL, as Dlungwana and Duma maintained their support for Zuma while Mtolo fostered an alliance with Malema. Mtolo denied these reports. According to the Business Day, he remained an ally of Malema's – holding fundraisers and otherwise mobilising support for him – even after Malema was expelled from the party in 2012.

In parallel to his ANCYL office, in 2011 Mtolo joined Greater Kokstad Local Municipality as an ANC councillor and was elected its Deputy Mayor, serving under Nosisa Jojozi. This reportedly exacerbated tensions within the provincial ANCYL leadership: the Mail & Guardian reported in late September 2011 that other provincial leaders had accused Mtolo of "double parking" and neglecting his league duties, and that they had given him an ultimatum to choose between the posts.

A week later, the entire provincial leadership corps of the ANCYL was disbanded by the Malema-led national leadership, prematurely ending Mtolo's term as Provincial Secretary. The national leadership said that the disbanding was motivated by ill discipline, but Dlungwana claimed that Malema was victimising Zuma's supporters in the league: Dlungwana and Duma, but not Mtolo, were expected to be subject to internal disciplinary charges for insubordination. When fresh leadership elections were finally run in 2015, Mtolo was succeeded as ANCYL Provincial Secretary by Thanduxolo Sabela.

== Mayor of Kokstad: 2016–2022 ==
After his removal from his ANCYL position, Mtolo remained in office as Deputy Mayor of Kokstad, and in November 2015 he was additionally elected to the Provincial Executive Committee of the mainstream ANC's KwaZulu-Natal branch. In May 2016, ahead of the 2016 local elections, there were violent service delivery protests in Kokstad as protestors called for Jojozi and Mtolo to be removed from their municipal offices. However, the ANC nominated both of them for re-election to the council and indeed named Mtolo as the party's mayoral candidate.

The ANC retained its majority in the elections, held in August 2016, and Mtolo was elected Greater Kokstad Mayor, with Karen Walker as his deputy. He was re-elected as mayor after the 2021 local elections and ultimately remained in office until 2022.

== ANC Provincial Secretary: 2022–present ==
In mid-2022, while still mayor, Mtolo had launched his bid to be elected Provincial Secretary of the KwaZulu-Natal ANC. He ran against the incumbent, Mdumiseni Ntuli, with the endorsement of the ANC's eThekwini branch, the largest in the country. His candidacy was aligned to the so-called "Taliban" slate, which had Siboniso Duma – Mtolo's former colleague from the ANCYL – as its candidate for the party chair, and the Mail & Guardian speculated that Mtolo, if elected, would endorse Zweli Mkhize's campaign for the ANC presidency later in 2022.

Duma and Mtolo were both elected when the party's elective conference was held in July 2022; Mtolo won 894 votes against Ntuli's 699. On 1 August 2022, Mtolo announced that he would resign as Kokstad Mayor at the end of the month, as the ANC Provincial Secretary position was a full-time post based out of the party's headquarters.

== Personal life ==
His wife, Nombuso Mtolo, joined the South African Parliament in 2024.
