= Sidumo Dlamini =

South African politician

Sidumo Dlamini MP

Member of Parliament from KwaZulu-Natal
- Incumbent
- Assumed office 2019

Personal details
- Born: Eswatini
- Party: ANC

Sidumo (Sdumo) Mbongeni Dlamini (born 2 March 1966) is a South African politician and former trade union leader.

Born in Ntshingila Hlatsikhulu in Eswatini, Dlamini's father died of tuberculosis when he was young, and he moved to South Africa to live with family members. He was educated at Ingwavuma High School while working on farms, then trained as a nurse. He moved to Durban to work at the Prince Mshiyeni Memorial Hospital and in 1990 joined the National Education, Health and Allied Workers' Union. In 2000, he was elected as regional chair of the Congress of South African Trade Unions (COSATU), then in 2006 as first deputy president of the federation. In 2008, he was appointed as president of COSATU, serving until 2018.

Dlamini joined the African National Congress (ANC) in 1990, and was elected as an ANC Member of Parliament (MP).

== Ministerial roles ==
Dlamini served as Deputy Minister of Agriculture, Land Reform and Rural Development from 30 May 2019 to 5 August 2021.

He was also Deputy Minister of Small Business Development from 5 August 2021 until 6 March 2023.

Trade union offices
Preceded by Joseph Nkosi	First Deputy President of the Congress of South African Trade Unions; 2006–2008	Succeeded by Tyotyo James
Preceded by Willie Madisha	President of the Congress of South African Trade Unions; 2008–2018	Succeeded by Zingiswa Losi
