= Bheki Ntshalintshali =

Bheki Ntshalintshali is a former South African trade union leader.

Born Veli Ntshalintshali, he was given the name "Bheki" by an official, when he first applied for identity documents. He undertook some training as a librarian and teacher, but had to quit to support his family, moving to Johannesburg, where after several deportations, he found work driving a taxi for his uncle. He soon became a taxi owner, and decided to return home, as operating taxis in Johannesburg was dangerous, and he wished to return to his studies.

Ntshalintshali was arrested for driving a taxi outside its licensed area. This was a minor offence, but in court he was additionally charged with involvement in terrorism. He had to report monthly for two years, when the charge was dropped, and he was merely fined R50 for the driving offence. As the charge had prevented him from studying, he instead found work at Sasol, where he joined the Chemical Workers' Industrial Union (CWIU). He was elected as a shop steward, but lost his job in 1984 for participating in a walkout.

In 1994, Ntshalintshali was elected as deputy general secretary of the CWIU, but stood down the following year, to study in England. He returned to South Africa in 1996, and took part in the talks which merged the CWIU into the new Chemical, Energy, Paper, Printing, Wood and Allied Workers' Union. Later in the year, he became the organising secretary of the Congress of South African Trade Unions (COSATU), rising to become deputy general secretary.

Ntshalintshali was elected as general secretary of COSATU in 2015, serving until 2022.
