= Police and Prisons Civil Rights Union =

Trade union in South Africa

POPCRU
- Police and Prisons Civil Rights Union
- Founded: November 1989
- Headquarters: Johannesburg, South Africa
- Location: South Africa
- Members: 120,000
- Key people: Zizamele Cebekhulu, president Nathi Theledi, secretary general
- Affiliations: COSATU, WFTU
- Website: www.popcru.org.za IT Manager Abel Mahlangu

The Police and Prisons Civil Rights Union (POPCRU) is a trade union in South Africa representing police officers, traffic officers and correctional officers, it has around 120,000 members. POPCRU was formed in 1989.

== History ==
On 5 September 1989, a group of Cape Coloured officers in the South African Police defied orders and refused to attack anti-apartheid protesters. Some of them worked with a group of prison warders to found POPCRU, in November. The new unions was unable to secure recognition, with many of its leaders being dismissed, and some being imprisoned. In 1993, it finally achieved recognition.

POPCRU is an affiliate of the Congress of South African Trade Unions (COSATU).

== Leadership ==
=== General Secretaries ===
Jacob Tsumane
2000s: Abbey Witbooi
2007: Nathi Theledi

=== Presidents ===
1989: Gregory Rockman
1990s: Johnny Jansen
1996: Zizamele Cebekhulu
