= National Education, Health and Allied Workers' Union =

Trade union in South Africa

NEHAWU
- National Education, Health and Allied Workers' Union
- Founded: 1987
- Headquarters: Johannesburg, Gauteng
- Location: South Africa
- Members: 289465
- Key people: Nyameka Macanda (President); Zola Saphetha (General Secretary)
- Affiliations: COSATU, WFTU, TUI-PAE
- Website: www.nehawu.org.za

The National Education, Health and Allied Workers' Union (NEHAWU) is a trade union in South Africa. With a membership of 276,000 it is the largest public sector union in the country. It organizes State, Health, Education and Welfare workers.

== History ==
The union was founded in 1987, when the Health and Allied Workers' Union merged with the General and Allied Workers' Union and the South African Allied Workers' Union.

The NEHAWU is affiliated with the Congress of South African Trade Unions (COSATU), and Public Services International and the Trade Union International Public Service and Allied employees.

== Leadership ==
=== National Office Bearers ===
NEHAWU National Congress Elected Leaders: 1987
| Position | Name | Surname |
|---|---|---|
| President | Bheki | Mkhize |
| Deputy President | Ntsiki | Matakane |
| National Treasurer | Gladys | Mlangeni |
| General Secretary | Yure | Mdyogolo |
| Organizing Secretary | Monde | Mditshwa |

NEHAWU National Congress Elected Leaders: 1989
| Position | Name | Surname |
|---|---|---|
| President | Bheki | Mkhize |
| 1st Deputy President | Mike | Basopu |
| 2nd Deputy President | Bheki | Phakathi |
| National Treasurer | Gladys | Mlangeni |
| General Secretary | Sisa | Njikelana |

NEHAWU National Congress Elected Leaders: 1992
| Position | Name | Surname |
|---|---|---|
| President | Bheki | Phakathi |
| 1st Deputy President | Vusi | Nhlapo |
| 2nd Deputy President | Caswell | Lehana |
| National Treasurer | Joyce | Mabhudafasi |
| General Secretary | Philip | Dexter |
| Deputy General Secretary | Neal | Thobejane |

NEHAWU Central Executive Committee Elected Leaders: 1993
| Position | Name | Surname |
|---|---|---|
| President | Vusi | Nhlapo |
| 1st Deputy President | Lulamile | Sotaka |
| 2nd Deputy President | Caswell | Lehana |
| National Treasurer | Joyce | Mabhudafasi |
| General Secretary | Philip | Dexter |
| Deputy General Secretary | Neal | Thobejane |

NEHAWU Central Executive Committee Elected Leaders:1994
| Position | Name | Surname |
|---|---|---|
| President | Vusi | Nhlapho |
| 1st Deputy President | Lulamile | Sotaka |
| 2nd Deputy President | Caswell | Lehana |
| National Treasurer | Jerry | Sithole |
| General Secretary | Neal | Thobejane |
| Deputy General Secretary | Fikile | Majola |

NEHAWU Na onal Congress Elected Leaders: 1995
| Position | Name | Surname |
|---|---|---|
| President | Vusi | Nhlapho |
| 1st Deputy President | Lulamile | Sotaka |
| 2nd Deputy President | Caswell | Lehana |
| National Treasurer | Jerry | Sithole |
| General Secretary | Neal | Thobejane |
| Deputy General Secretary | Fikile | Majola |

NEHAWU National Congress Elected Leaders: 1998
| Position | Name | Surname |
|---|---|---|
| President | Vusi | Nhlapho |
| 1st Deputy President | Lulamile | Sotaka |
| 2nd Deputy President | Noluthando | Mayende-Sibiya |
| National Treasurer | Lindelwa | Dunjwa |
| General Secretary | Fikile | Majola |
| Deputy General Secretary | David | Makhura |

NEHAWU National Congress Elected Leaders: 2001
| Position | Name | Surname |
|---|---|---|
| President | Vusi | Nhlapo |
| 1st Deputy President | Lulamile | Sotaka |
| 2nd Deputy President | Noluthando | Mayende-Sibiya |
| National Treasurer | Lindelwa | Dunjwa |
| General Secretary | Fikile | Majola |
| Deputy General Secretary | David | Makhura |

NEHAWU National Congress Elected Leaders: 2004
| Position | Name | Surname |
|---|---|---|
| President | Noluthando | Mayende-Sibiya |
| 1st Deputy President | Lulamile | Sotaka |
| 2nd Deputy President | Mzwandile | Makwayiba |
| National Treasurer | Prabir | Badal |
| General Secretary | Fikile | Majola |
| Deputy General Secretary | Kgaugelo | Ramodise |

NEHAWU National Congress Elected Leaders: 2007
| Position | Name | Surname |
|---|---|---|
| President | Noluthando | Mayende-Sibiya |
| 1st Deputy President | Lulamile | Sotaka |
| 2nd Deputy President | Mzwandile | Makwayiba |
| National Treasurer | Prabir | Badal |
| General Secretary | Fikile | Majola |
| Deputy General Secretary | Cyril | Langbooi |

NEHAWU National Congress Elected Leaders: 2010
| Position | Name | Surname |
|---|---|---|
| President | Mzwandile | Makwayiba |
| 1st Deputy President | Joe | Mpisi |
| 2nd Deputy President | Thozama | Mantashe |
| National Treasurer | Prabir | Badal |
| General Secretary | Fikile | Majola |
| Deputy General Secretary | Suraya | Jawoodeen |

NEHAWU National Congress Elected Leaders: 2013
| Position | Name | Surname |
|---|---|---|
| President | Mzwandile | Makwayiba |
| 1st Deputy President | Joe | Mpisi |
| 2nd Deputy President | Thozama | Mantashe |
| National Treasurer | Pulane | Mogotsi |
| General Secretary | Fikile | Majola |
| Deputy General Secretary | Bereng | Soke |

NEHAWU Special National Congress Elected Leaders: 2014
| Position | Name | Surname |
|---|---|---|
| President Mzwandile | Michael | Makwayiba |
| 1st Deputy President | Michael | Shingange |
| 2nd Deputy President | Nyameka | Macanda |
| National Treasurer | Kgomotso | Makhupola |
| General Secretary | Bereng | Soke |
| Deputy General Secretary | Zola Knowledge | Saphetha |

NEHAWU National Congress Elected Leaders: 2017
| Position | Name | Surname |
|---|---|---|
| President | Mzwandile Michael | Makwayiba |
| 1st Deputy President | Michael | Shingange |
| 2nd Deputy President | Nyameka | Macanda |
| National Treasurer | Kgomotso Hilda | Makhupola |
| General Secretary | Zola Knowledge | Saphetha |
| Deputy General Secretary | December | Mavuso |

NEHAWU National Congress Elected Leaders: 2021
| Position | Name | Surname |
|---|---|---|
| President | Michael | Shingange |
| 1st Deputy President | Nyameka | Macanda |
| 2nd Deputy President | Patrick | Makhafane |
| National Treasurer | Kgomotso Hilda | Makhupola |
| General Secretary | Zola Knowledge | Saphetha |
| Deputy General Secretary | December | Mavuso |

NEHAWU National Congress Elected Leaders: 2026
| Position | Name | Surname |
|---|---|---|
| President | Nyameka | Macanda |
| 1st Deputy President | Patrick | Makhafane |
| 2nd Deputy President | Linda | Nthulane |
| National Treasurer | Kgomotso Hilda | Makhupola |
| General Secretary | Zola Knowledge | Saphetha |
| 1st Deputy General Secretary | December | Mavuso |
| 2nd Deputy General Secretary | Baxolise | Mali |
