= First cabinet of Cyril Ramaphosa =

Government of South Africa under President Ramaphosa from 2018 to 2019

First Ramaphosa Cabinet
- 7th Cabinet of the Republic of South Africa (since the 1994 election)
- 2018–2019
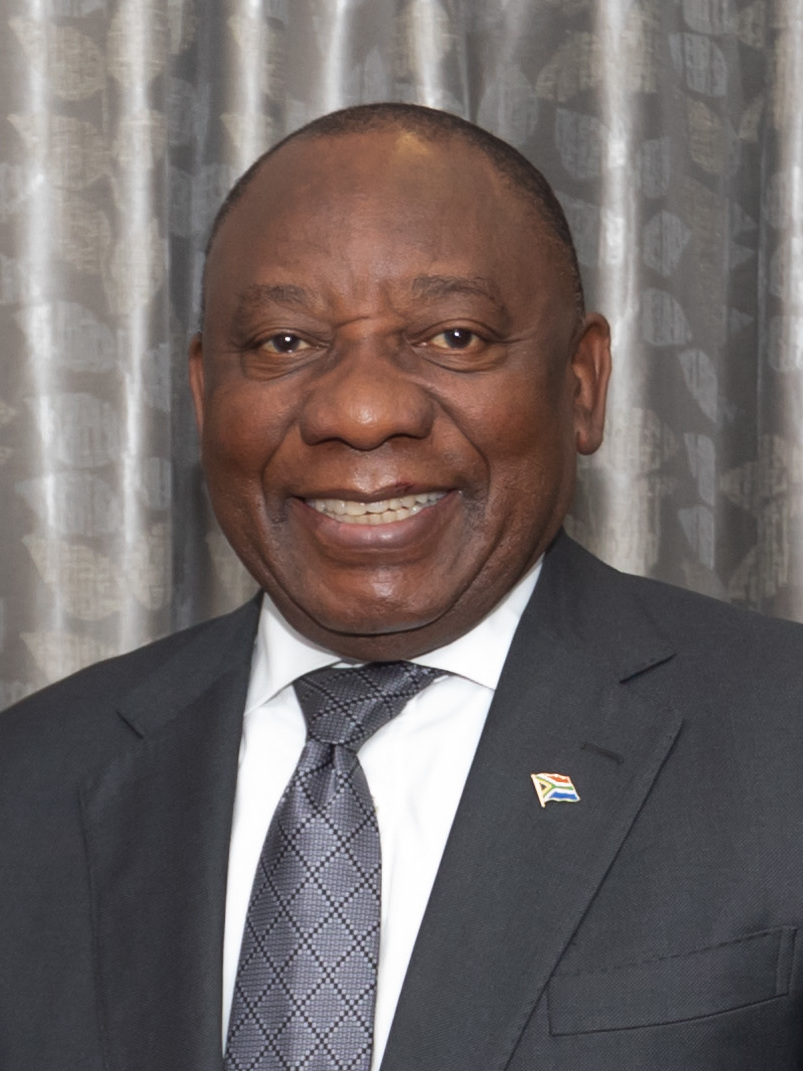
- Cyril Ramaphosa (2018)
- Date formed: 27 February 2018
- Date dissolved: 29 May 2019 (1 year, 3 months and 2 days)

People and organisations
- President: Cyril Ramaphosa
- Deputy President: David Mabuza
- No. of ministers: 33 ministers
- Member parties: African National Congress
- Status in legislature: Majority
- Opposition parties: Democratic Alliance
- Opposition leaders: Mmusi Maimane

History
- Election: 2014 election
- Legislature term: Fifth Parliament
- Predecessor: Zuma II
- Successor: Ramaphosa II

The first cabinet of Cyril Ramaphosa was the cabinet of the government of South Africa between 27 February 2018 and 29 May 2019. It was formed by Ramaphosa after he won a midterm election to succeed Jacob Zuma as President of South Africa. It comprised 33 ministers and served until the 2019 general election.

During this first term, Ramaphosa did not make structural changes to the cabinet, with the sole exception of a merger between the Ministry of Communications and Ministry of Telecommunications and Postal Services. He effected a single cabinet reshuffle on 22 November 2018.

== History ==
=== Appointment ===
President Jacob Zuma resigned as President of the Republic of South Africa on 14 February 2018, and President Cyril Ramaphosa became his successor after a midterm election in the National Assembly. He was inaugurated as president on 15 February 2018 and retained Zuma's cabinet for 10 days before announcing his cabinet in a televised address on 26 February 2018.

Although he retained many of Zuma's ministers, Ramaphosa reversed some of Zuma's most controversial appointments in economic ministries. The ministers whom he sacked included Fikile Mbalula, Lynne Brown, Faith Muthambi, Hlengiwe Mkhize, Des van Rooyen, Mosebenzi Zwane, and David Mahlobo.

=== Reshuffles ===
On 9 October 2018, Ramaphosa announced that Nhlanhla Nene had resigned as Minister of Finance and would be replaced by Tito Mboweni with immediate effect.

On 22 November 2018, he announced a more comprehensive cabinet reshuffle, occasioned by the death of Minister Edna Molewa and the resignation of Malusi Gigaba. In the reshuffle he made new appointments to the Ministry of Home Affairs, the Ministry of Environmental Affairs, and the Ministry of Communications. He also announced that the latter ministry would absorb the former Ministry of Telecommunications and Postal Services.

== List of ministers ==
Legend
	African National Congress
1 asterisk	New appointment since the last cabinet

Post		Minister	Term		Party
	President of South Africa	His Excellency Cyril Ramaphosa	2018	2019	ANC
1 asterisk	Deputy President of South Africa	His Excellency David Mabuza	2018	2019	ANC
1 asterisk	Minister in the Presidency for Planning, Monitoring and Evaluation	The Hon. Nkosazana Dlamini-Zuma MP	2018	2019	ANC
1 asterisk	Minister in the Presidency for Women	The Hon. Bathabile Dlamini MP	2018	2019	ANC
	Minister of Agriculture, Forestry and Fisheries	The Hon. Senzeni Zokwana MP	2018	2019	ANC
	Minister of Arts and Culture	The Hon. Nathi Mthethwa MP	2018	2019	ANC
	Minister of Basic Education	The Hon. Angie Motshekga MP	2018	2019	ANC
1 asterisk	Minister of Communications	The Hon. Stella Ndabeni-Abrahams MP	2018	2019	ANC
1 asterisk	Minister of Communications	The Hon. Nomvula Mokonyane MP	2018	2018	ANC
1 asterisk	Minister of Cooperative Governance and Traditional Affairs	The Hon. Zweli Mkhize MP	2018	2019	ANC
	Minister of Defence and Military Veterans	The Hon. Nosiviwe Mapisa-Nqakula MP	2018	2019	ANC
	Minister of Economic Development	The Hon. Ebrahim Patel MP	2018	2019	ANC
1 asterisk	Minister of Energy	The Hon. Jeff Radebe MP	2018	2019	ANC
	Minister of Environmental Affairs	The Hon. Nomvula Mokonyane MP	2018	2019	ANC
	Minister of Environmental Affairs	The Hon. Edna Molewa MP	2018	2018	ANC
1 asterisk	Minister of Finance	The Hon. Tito Mboweni	2018	2019	ANC
	Minister of Finance	The Hon. Nhlanhla Nene MP	2018	2018	ANC
	Minister of Health	The Hon. Aaron Motsoaledi MP	2018	2019	ANC
1 asterisk	Minister of Higher Education and Training	The Hon. Naledi Pandor MP	2018	2019	ANC
1 asterisk	Minister of Home Affairs	The Hon. Siyabonga Cwele MP	2018	2019	ANC
1 asterisk	Minister of Home Affairs	The Hon. Malusi Gigaba MP	2018	2018	ANC
1 asterisk	Minister of Human Settlements	The Hon. Nomaindia Mfeketo MP	2018	2019	ANC
1 asterisk	Minister of International Relations and Cooperation	The Hon. Lindiwe Sisulu MP	2018	2019	ANC
	Minister of Labour	The Hon. Mildred Oliphant MP	2018	2019	ANC
1 asterisk	Minister of Mineral Resources	The Hon. Gwede Mantashe MP	2018	2019	ANC
1 asterisk	Minister of Police	The Hon. Bheki Cele MP	2018	2019	ANC
1 asterisk	Minister of Public Enterprises	The Hon. Pravin Gordhan MP	2018	2019	ANC
1 asterisk	Minister of Public Service and Administration	The Hon. Ayanda Dlodlo MP	2018	2019	ANC
1 asterisk	Minister of Public Works	The Hon. Thulas Nxesi MP	2018	2019	ANC
1 asterisk	Minister of Rural Development and Land Reform	The Hon. Maite Nkoana-Mashabane MP	2018	2019	ANC
1 asterisk	Minister of Science and Technology	The Hon. Mmamoloko Kubayi-Ngubane MP	2018	2019	ANC
	Minister of Small Business Development	The Hon. Lindiwe Zulu MP	2018	2019	ANC
1 asterisk	Minister of Social Development	The Hon. Susan Shabangu MP	2018	2019	ANC
1 asterisk	Minister of Sport and Recreation	The Hon. Tokozile Xasa MP	2018	2019	ANC
1 asterisk	Minister of State Security	The Hon. Dipuo Letsatsi-Duba MP	2018	2019	ANC
	Minister of Telecommunications and Postal Services	The Hon. Siyabonga Cwele MP	2018	2018	ANC
1 asterisk	Minister of Tourism	The Hon. Derek Hanekom MP	2018	2019	ANC
	Minister of Trade and Industry	The Hon. Rob Davies MP	2018	2019	ANC
1 asterisk	Minister of Transport	The Hon. Blade Nzimande MP	2018	2019	ANC
1 asterisk	Minister of Water and Sanitation	The Hon. Gugile Nkwinti MP	2018	2019	ANC

== List of deputy ministers ==
Although deputy ministers are not members of the cabinet, they are appointed by the president and assist cabinet ministers in the execution of their duties. Ramaphosa made certain new deputy ministerial appointments in February 2018, marked with an asterisk below. After that, however, he did not reshuffle the deputy ministers at any point during his cabinet's term.

Post		Minister	Term		Party
1 asterisk	Deputy Minister of Agriculture, Forestry and Fisheries	The Hon. Sfiso Buthelezi MP	2018	2019	ANC
	Deputy Minister of Arts and Culture	The Hon. Maggie Sotyu MP	2018	2019	ANC
	Deputy Minister of Basic Education	The Hon. Enver Surty MP	2018	2019	ANC
1 asterisk	Deputy Minister of Communications	The Hon. Pinky Kekana MP	2018	2019	ANC
	Deputy Minister of Cooperative Governance and Traditional Affairs 1st	The Hon. Andries Nel MP	2018	2019	ANC
	Deputy Minister of Cooperative Governance and Traditional Affairs 2nd	The Hon. Obed Bapela MP	2018	2019	ANC
	Deputy Minister of Correctional Services	The Hon. Thabang Makwetla MP	2018	2019	ANC
	Deputy Minister of Defence and Military Veterans	The Hon. Kebby Maphatsoe MP	2018	2019	ANC
	Deputy Minister of Economic Development	The Hon. Madala Masuku MP	2018	2019	ANC
	Deputy Minister of Energy	Office vacant			
	Deputy Minister of Energy	The Hon. Thembi Majola MP	2018	2018	ANC
	Deputy Minister of Environmental Affairs	The Hon. Barbara Thomson MP	2018	2019	ANC
1 asterisk	Deputy Minister of Finance	The Hon. Mondli Gungubele MP *	2018	2019	ANC
	Deputy Minister of Health	The Hon. Joe Phaahla MP	2018	2019	ANC
	Deputy Minister of Higher Education and Training	The Hon. Buti Manamela MP	2018	2019	ANC
	Deputy Minister of Home Affairs	The Hon. Fatima Chohan MP	2018	2019	ANC
	Deputy Minister of Human Settlements	The Hon. Zoe Kota-Hendricks MP	2018	2019	ANC
1 asterisk	Deputy Minister of International Relations and Cooperation 1st	The Hon. Reginah Mhaule MP	2018	2019	ANC
	Deputy Minister of International Relations and Cooperation 2nd	The Hon. Luwellyn Landers MP	2018	2019	ANC
	Deputy Minister of Justice and Constitutional Development	The Hon. John Jeffery MP	2018	2019	ANC
	Deputy Minister of Labour	The Hon. Patekile Holomisa MP	2018	2019	ANC
	Deputy Minister of Mineral Resources	The Hon. Godfrey Oliphant MP	2018	2019	ANC
	Deputy Minister of Police	The Hon. Bongani Mkongi MP	2018	2019	ANC
1 asterisk	Deputy Minister of Public Enterprises	Office vacant			
1 asterisk	Deputy Minister of Public Service and Administration	The Hon. Chana Pilane-Majake MP	2018	2019	ANC
	Deputy Minister of Public Works	The Hon. Jeremy Cronin MP	2018	2019	ANC
	Deputy Minister of Rural Development and Land Reform 1st	The Hon. Mcebisi Skwatsha MP	2018	2019	ANC
	Deputy Minister of Rural Development and Land Reform 2nd	The Hon. Candith Mashego-Dlamini MP	2018	2019	ANC
	Deputy Minister of Science and Technology	The Hon. Zanele kaMagwaza-Msibi MP	2018	2019	NFP
1 asterisk	Deputy Minister of Small Business Development	The Hon. Cassel Mathale MP	2018	2019	ANC
	Deputy Minister of Social Development	The Hon. Hendrietta Bogopane-Zulu MP	2018	2019	ANC
	Deputy Minister of Sport and Recreation	The Hon. Gert Oosthuizen MP	2018	2019	ANC
	Deputy Minister of State Security	The Hon. Ellen Molekane MP	2018	2019	ANC
	Deputy Minister of Telecommunications and Postal Services	The Hon. Stella Ndabeni-Abrahams MP	2018	2018	ANC
	Deputy Minister of Tourism	The Hon. Elizabeth Thabethe MP	2018	2019	ANC
	Deputy Minister of Trade and Industry	The Hon. Bulelani Magwanishe MP	2018	2019	ANC
	Deputy Minister of Transport	The Hon. Sindy Chikunga MP	2018	2019	ANC
	Deputy Minister of Water and Sanitation	The Hon. Pam Tshwete MP	2018	2019	ANC
