= Second cabinet of Jacob Zuma =

Government of South Africa under President Zuma from 2014 to 2018

Second Zuma Cabinet
- 6th Cabinet of the Republic of South Africa (since the 1994 election)
- 2014–2018
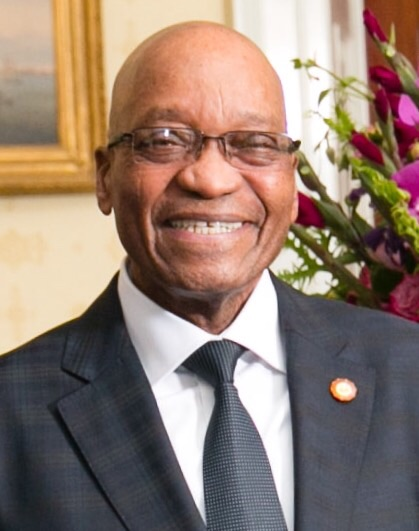
- Jacob Zuma (2014)
- Date formed: 25 May 2014
- Date dissolved: 14 February 2018 (3 years, 8 months and 20 days)

People and organisations
- President: Jacob Zuma
- Deputy President: Cyril Ramaphosa
- No. of ministers: 35 ministers
- Member parties: African National Congress
- Status in legislature: Majority
- Opposition parties: Democratic Alliance
- Opposition leaders: Mmusi Maimane

History
- Election: 2014 election
- Legislature term: Fifth Parliament
- Predecessor: Zuma I
- Successor: Ramaphosa I

The second cabinet of Jacob Zuma was the cabinet of the government of South Africa between 25 May 2014 and 14 February 2018. It was formed by Zuma after his re-election in the 2014 general election, and it served until Zuma resigned as President of South Africa on 14 February 2018. Comprising 35 ministers, the cabinet changed in composition on several occasions between 2015 and 2017, most notably in a major cabinet reshuffle in March 2017.

== Appointment ==
On 24 May 2014, President Jacob Zuma was inaugurated as the President of South Africa following the victory of his African National Congress (ANC) in that month's general election. He announced his second-term cabinet on 25 May. Although many of the ministers had served in his first-term cabinet, most were moved to new portfolios. Zuma also announced several changes to the structure of the cabinet:

- The Ministry of Women, Youth and People with Disabilities was turned into the Ministry in the Presidency for Women, located in the Presidency and responsible for a narrower portfolio (responsibility for children and people with disabilities having been transferred to the Ministry of Social Development).
- The communications portfolio was expanded and divided between the Ministry of Communications and Ministry of Telecommunications and Postal Services.
- The Ministry of Justice and Constitutional Development was merged with the Ministry of Correctional Services to create the Ministry of Justice and Correctional Services.
- The Ministry of Water and Sanitation was established.
- The Ministry of Small Business Development was established; and
- A single Minister in the Presidency was appointed with responsibility both for the National Planning Commission and for performance monitoring and evaluation.

The cabinet comprised 35 ministers, and Zuma also appointed 36 deputy ministers. 20 of the ministers and 16 of the deputy ministers were women.

== Reshuffles ==
Zuma announced his first, minor reshuffle in the early hours of 23 September 2015. He shifted Ngoako Ramatlhodi to the position of Minister of Public Service and Administration, which had been vacated by Minister Collins Chabane's death in March; Mosebenzi Zwane was in turn appointed to Ramatlhodi's former position as Minister of Mineral Resources.

On 9 December 2015, Zuma sacked Nhlanhla Nene as Minister of Finance and replaced him with the little-known backbencher Des van Rooyen. After an extremely negative response from the markets and from segments of the ANC, Zuma reversed his decision and announced on 13 December that Pravin Gordhan would replace van Rooyen after only four days in office; van Rooyen in turn took Gordhan's place as Minister of Cooperative Governance and Traditional Affairs.

In the early hours of 31 March 2017, Zuma announced a major cabinet reshuffle, affecting ten ministers – five of whom were dismissed – and ten deputy ministers. Most notably, Gordhan was replaced as Finance Minister by Malusi Gigaba. Senior ANC leaders, including Deputy President Cyril Ramaphosa, severely criticised the reshuffle. The so-called #ZumaMustFall protests the following week voiced public opposition to the changes.

Zuma's last reshuffle, his 12th over two terms in office, was announced on 17 October 2017 and affected five ministers and one deputy minister. It was most notable for the dismissal of Minister Blade Nzimande, which invited a fierce response from Nzimande's South African Communist Party.

== List of ministers ==
Legend
| African National Congress |

| Post | Minister | Term | | Party |
|---|---|---|---|---|
| President of South Africa | His Excellency Jacob Zuma | 2009 | 2018 | ANC |
| Deputy President of South Africa | His Excellency Cyril Ramaphosa | 2014 | 2018 | ANC |
| Minister in the Presidency | The Hon. Jeff Radebe MP | 2014 | 2018 | ANC |
| Minister of Women in the Presidency | The Hon. Susan Shabangu MP | 2014 | 2018 | ANC |
| Minister of Agriculture, Forestry and Fisheries | The Hon. Senzeni Zokwana MP | 2014 | 2019 | ANC |
| Minister of Arts and Culture | The Hon. Nathi Mthethwa MP | 2014 | 2019 | ANC |
| Minister of Basic Education | The Hon. Angie Motshekga MP | 2009 | 2024 | ANC |
| Minister of Communications | The Hon. Mmamoloko Kubayi-Ngubane MP | 2017 | 2018 | ANC |
| Minister of Communications | The Hon. Ayanda Dlodlo MP | 2017 | 2017 | ANC |
| Minister of Communications | The Hon. Faith Muthambi MP | 2014 | 2017 | ANC |
| Minister of Cooperative Governance and Traditional Affairs | The Hon. Des van Rooyen MP | 2015 | 2018 | ANC |
| Minister of Cooperative Governance and Traditional Affairs | The Hon. Pravin Gordhan MP | 2014 | 2015 | ANC |
| Minister of Defence and Military Veterans | The Hon. Nosiviwe Mapisa-Nqakula MP | 2013 | 2021 | ANC |
| Minister of Economic Development | The Hon. Ebrahim Patel MP | 2009 | 2019 | ANC |
| Minister of Energy | The Hon. David Mahlobo MP | 2017 | 2018 | ANC |
| Minister of Energy | The Hon. Mmamoloko Kubayi MP | 2017 | 2017 | ANC |
| Minister of Energy | The Hon. Tina Joemat-Pettersson MP | 2014 | 2017 | ANC |
| Minister of Environmental Affairs | The Hon. Edna Molewa MP | 2014 | 2018 | ANC |
| Minister of Finance | The Hon. Malusi Gigaba MP | 2017 | 2018 | ANC |
| Minister of Finance | The Hon. Pravin Gordhan MP | 2015 | 2017 | ANC |
| Minister of Finance | The Hon. David van Rooyen MP | 2015 | 2015 | ANC |
| Minister of Finance | The Hon. Nhlanhla Nene MP | 2014 | 2015 | ANC |
| Minister of Health | The Hon. Aaron Motsoaledi MP | 2009 | 2019 | ANC |
| Minister of Higher Education and Training | The Hon. Hlengiwe Mkhize MP | 2017 | 2018 | ANC |
| Minister of Higher Education and Training | The Hon. Blade Nzimande MP | 2009 | 2017 | ANC |
| Minister of Home Affairs | The Hon. Ayanda Dlodlo MP | 2017 | 2018 | ANC |
| Minister of Home Affairs | The Hon. Hlengiwe Mkhize MP | 2017 | 2017 | ANC |
| Minister of Home Affairs | The Hon. Malusi Gigaba MP | 2014 | 2017 | ANC |
| Minister of Human Settlements | The Hon. Lindiwe Sisulu MP | 2014 | 2018 | ANC |
| Minister of International Relations and Cooperation | The Hon. Maite Nkoana-Mashabane MP | 2009 | 2018 | ANC |
| Minister of Justice and Correctional Services | The Hon. Michael Masutha MP | 2014 | 2019 | ANC |
| Minister of Labour | The Hon. Mildred Oliphant MP | 2010 | 2019 | ANC |
| Minister of Mineral Resources | The Hon. Mosebenzi Zwane MP | 2015 | 2018 | ANC |
| Minister of Mineral Resources | The Hon. Ngoako Ramatlhodi MP | 2014 | 2015 | ANC |
| Minister of Police | The Hon. Fikile Mbalula MP | 2017 | 2018 | ANC |
| Minister of Police | The Hon. Nkosinathi Nhleko MP | 2014 | 2017 | ANC |
| Minister of Public Enterprises | The Hon. Lynne Brown MP | 2014 | 2018 | ANC |
| Minister of Public Service and Administration | The Hon. Faith Muthambi MP | 2017 | 2018 | ANC |
| Minister of Public Service and Administration | The Hon. Ngoako Ramatlhodi MP | 2015 | 2017 | ANC |
| Minister of Public Service and Administration | The Hon. Collins Chabane MP | 2014 | 2015 | ANC |
| Minister of Public Works | The Hon. Nathi Nhleko MP | 2017 | 2018 | ANC |
| Minister of Public Works | The Hon. Thulas Nxesi MP | 2011 | 2017 | ANC |
| Minister of Rural Development and Land Reform | The Hon. Gugile Nkwinti MP | 2009 | 2018 | ANC |
| Minister of Science and Technology | The Hon. Naledi Pandor MP | 2014 | 2018 | ANC |
| Minister of Small Business Development | The Hon. Lindiwe Zulu MP | 2014 | 2019 | ANC |
| Minister of Social Development | The Hon. Bathabile Dlamini MP | 2010 | 2018 | ANC |
| Minister of Sport and Recreation | The Hon. Thembelani Nxesi MP | 2017 | 2018 | ANC |
| Minister of Sport and Recreation | The Hon. Fikile Mbalula MP | 2010 | 2017 | ANC |
| Minister of State Security | The Hon. Bongani Bongo MP | 2017 | 2018 | ANC |
| Minister of State Security | The Hon. David Mahlobo MP | 2014 | 2017 | ANC |
| Minister of Telecommunications and Postal Services | The Hon. Siyabonga Cwele MP | 2014 | 2018 | ANC |
| Minister of Tourism | The Hon. Tokozile Xasa MP | 2017 | 2018 | ANC |
| Minister of Tourism | The Hon. Derek Hanekom MP | 2014 | 2017 | ANC |
| Minister of Trade and Industry | The Hon. Rob Davies MP | 2009 | 2019 | ANC |
| Minister of Transport | The Hon. Joe Maswanganyi MP | 2017 | 2018 | ANC |
| Minister of Transport | The Hon. Dipuo Peters MP | 2013 | 2017 | ANC |
| Minister of Water and Sanitation | The Hon. Nomvula Mokonyane MP | 2014 | 2018 | ANC |

== List of deputy ministers ==
Although deputy ministers are not members of the cabinet, they are appointed by the president and assist cabinet ministers in the execution of their duties. During the term of Zuma's second cabinet, they were, like the cabinet, appointed on 25 May 2014, with the exception of Deputy Minister Zanele kaMagwaza-Msibi, the leader of the National Freedom Party, whose appointment was announced on 5 June 2014. Deputy ministers were affected by the reshuffles of March 2017 and October 2017.

| Post | Minister | Term | | Party |
|---|---|---|---|---|
| Deputy Minister in the Presidency | Office vacant | | | |
| Deputy Minister in the Presidency | The Hon. Buti Manamela MP | 2014 | 2017 | ANC |
| Deputy Minister of Agriculture, Forestry and Fisheries | The Hon. Bheki Cele MP | 2014 | 2018 | ANC |
| Deputy Minister of Arts and Culture | The Hon. Maggie Sotyu MP | 2017 | 2018 | ANC |
| Deputy Minister of Arts and Culture | The Hon. Rejoice Mabudafhasi MP | 2014 | 2017 | ANC |
| Deputy Minister of Basic Education | The Hon. Enver Surty MP | 2014 | 2018 | ANC |
| Deputy Minister of Communications | The Hon. Thandi Mahambehlala MP | 2017 | 2018 | ANC |
| Deputy Minister of Communications | The Hon. Stella Ndabeni-Abrahams MP | 2014 | 2017 | ANC |
| Deputy Minister of Cooperative Governance and Traditional Affairs 1st | The Hon. Andries Nel MP | 2014 | 2018 | ANC |
| Deputy Minister of Cooperative Governance and Traditional Affairs 2nd | The Hon. Obed Bapela MP | 2014 | 2018 | ANC |
| Deputy Minister of Correctional Services | The Hon. Thabang Makwetla MP | 2014 | 2018 | ANC |
| Deputy Minister of Defence and Military Veterans | The Hon. Kebby Maphatsoe MP | 2014 | 2018 | ANC |
| Deputy Minister of Economic Development | The Hon. Madala Masuku MP | 2014 | 2018 | ANC |
| Deputy Minister of Energy | The Hon. Thembi Majola MP | 2014 | 2018 | ANC |
| Deputy Minister of Environmental Affairs | The Hon. Barbara Thomson MP | 2014 | 2018 | ANC |
| Deputy Minister of Finance | The Hon. Sfiso Buthelezi MP | 2017 | 2018 | ANC |
| Deputy Minister of Finance | The Hon. Mcebisi Jonas MP | 2014 | 2017 | ANC |
| Deputy Minister of Health | The Hon. Joe Phaahla MP | 2014 | 2018 | ANC |
| Deputy Minister of Higher Education and Training | The Hon. Buti Manamela MP | 2017 | 2018 | ANC |
| Deputy Minister of Higher Education and Training | The Hon. Mduduzi Manana MP | 2014 | 2017 | ANC |
| Deputy Minister of Home Affairs | The Hon. Fatima Chohan MP | 2014 | 2018 | ANC |
| Deputy Minister of Human Settlements | The Hon. Zoe Kota-Hendricks MP | 2014 | 2018 | ANC |
| Deputy Minister of International Relations and Cooperation 1st | The Hon. Nomaindia Mfeketo MP | 2014 | 2018 | ANC |
| Deputy Minister of International Relations and Cooperation 2nd | The Hon. Luwellyn Landers MP | 2014 | 2018 | ANC |
| Deputy Minister of Justice and Constitutional Development | The Hon. John Jeffery MP | 2014 | 2018 | ANC |
| Deputy Minister of Labour | The Hon. Patekile Holomisa MP | 2014 | 2018 | ANC |
| Deputy Minister of Mineral Resources | The Hon. Godfrey Oliphant MP | 2014 | 2018 | ANC |
| Deputy Minister of Police | The Hon. Bongani Mkongi MP | 2017 | 2018 | ANC |
| Deputy Minister of Police | The Hon. Maggie Sotyu MP | 2014 | 2017 | ANC |
| Deputy Minister of Public Enterprises | The Hon. Ben Martins MP | 2017 | 2018 | ANC |
| Deputy Minister of Public Enterprises | The Hon. Bulelani Magwanishe MP | 2014 | 2017 | ANC |
| Deputy Minister of Public Service and Administration | The Hon. Dipuo Letsatsi-Duba MP | 2017 | 2018 | ANC |
| Deputy Minister of Public Service and Administration | The Hon. Ayanda Dlodlo MP | 2014 | 2017 | ANC |
| Deputy Minister of Public Works | The Hon. Jeremy Cronin MP | 2014 | 2018 | ANC |
| Deputy Minister of Rural Development and Land Reform 1st | The Hon. Mcebisi Skwatsha MP | 2014 | 2018 | ANC |
| Deputy Minister of Rural Development and Land Reform 2nd | The Hon. Candith Mashego-Dlamini MP | 2014 | 2018 | ANC |
| Deputy Minister of Science and Technology | The Hon. Zanele kaMagwaza-Msibi MP | 2014 | 2018 | NFP |
| Deputy Minister of Small Business Development | The Hon. Nomathemba November MP | 2017 | 2018 | ANC |
| Deputy Minister of Small Business Development | The Hon. Elizabeth Thabethe MP | 2014 | 2017 | ANC |
| Deputy Minister of Social Development | The Hon. Hendrietta Bogopane-Zulu MP | 2014 | 2018 | ANC |
| Deputy Minister of Sport and Recreation | The Hon. Gert Oosthuizen MP | 2014 | 2018 | ANC |
| Deputy Minister of State Security | The Hon. Ellen Molekane MP | 2014 | 2018 | ANC |
| Deputy Minister of Telecommunications and Postal Services | The Hon. Stella Ndabeni-Abrahams MP | 2017 | 2018 | ANC |
| Deputy Minister of Telecommunications and Postal Services | The Hon. Hlengiwe Mkhize MP | 2014 | 2017 | ANC |
| Deputy Minister of Tourism | The Hon. Elizabeth Thabethe MP | 2017 | 2018 | ANC |
| Deputy Minister of Tourism | The Hon. Thokozile Xasa MP | 2014 | 2017 | ANC |
| Deputy Minister of Trade and Industry | The Hon. Bulelani Magwanishe MP | 2017 | 2018 | ANC |
| Deputy Minister of Trade and Industry | The Hon. Mzwandile Masina MP | 2014 | 2016 | ANC |
| Deputy Minister of Transport | The Hon. Sindy Chikunga MP | 2014 | 2018 | ANC |
| Deputy Minister of Water and Sanitation | The Hon. Pam Tshwete MP | 2014 | 2018 | ANC |

== See also ==
- Presidency of Jacob Zuma
