= Second cabinet of Cyril Ramaphosa =

Second Ramaphosa Cabinet
- 8th Cabinet of the Republic of South Africa (since the 1994 election)
- 2019–2024
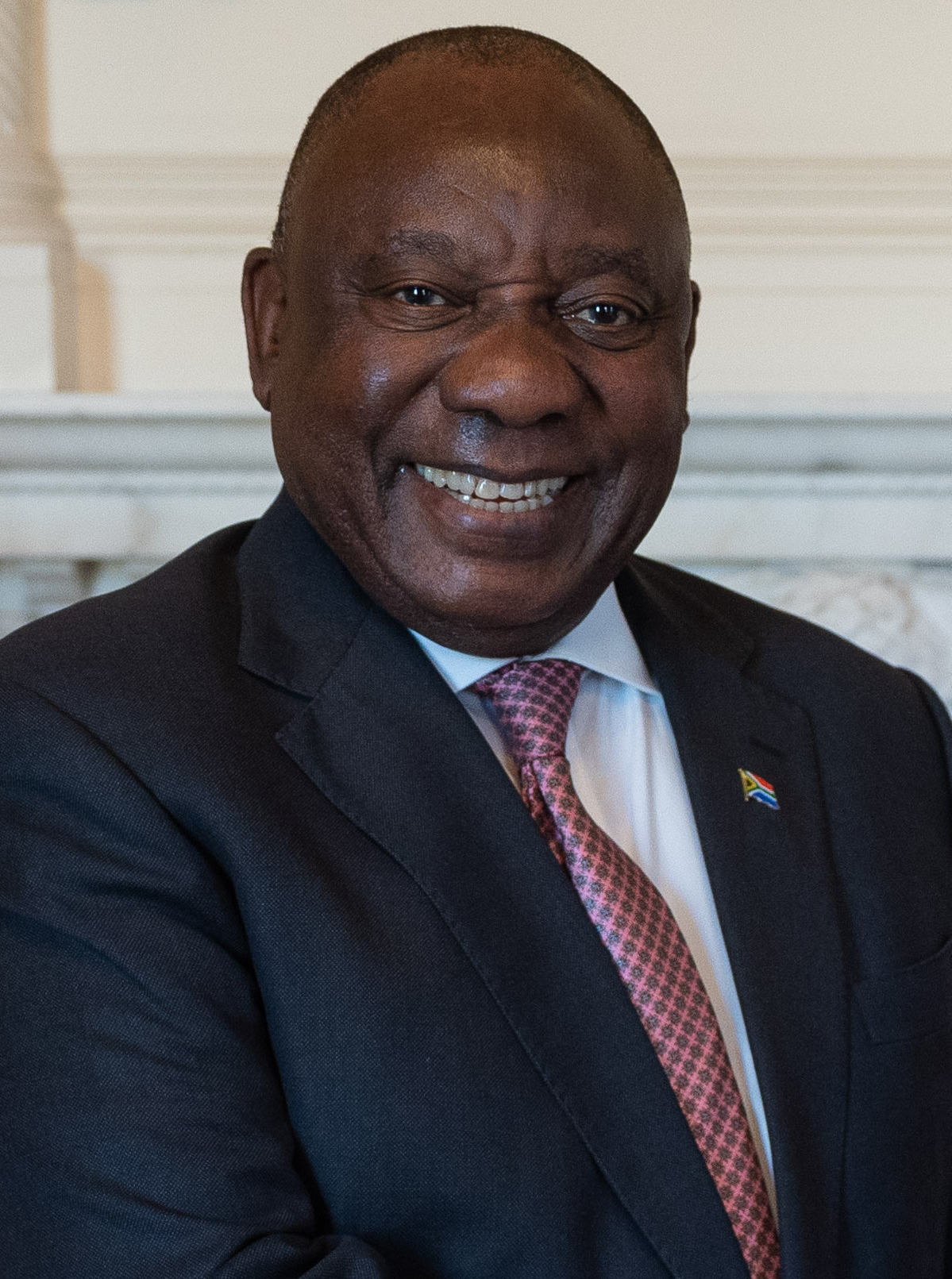
- Cyril Ramaphosa (2022)
- Date formed: 29 May 2019
- Date dissolved: 19 June 2024 (5 years and 21 days)

People and organisations
- President: Cyril Ramaphosa
- Deputy President: David Mabuza (until 2023); Paul Mashatile (from 2023)
- No. of ministers: 30 ministers
- Member parties: African National Congress; Good
- Status in legislature: Majority
- Opposition parties: Democratic Alliance
- Opposition leaders: Mmusi Maimane (until 2019); John Steenhuisen (from 2019)

History
- Election: 2019 election
- Legislature term: Sixth Parliament
- Predecessor: Ramaphosa I
- Successor: Ramaphosa III

The Second cabinet of Cyril Ramaphosa was the cabinet of the government of South Africa between 29 May 2019 and 19 June 2024. It was formed by President Ramaphosa after the 2019 general election and dissolved after the 2024 general election. In the interim it was reshuffled twice – once in August 2021 and once in March 2023 – and augmented in size from 28 ministers to 30 ministers.

== History ==
=== May 2019 appointment ===
The African National Congress (ANC) won a majority in the 2019 general election and President Cyril Ramaphosa was elected to his first full term as President of South Africa. After his inauguration on 25 May 2019, he announced his cabinet on 29 May. The newly appointed ministers were sworn in the next day by Chief Justice Mogoeng Mogoeng at the Sefako Makgatho Presidential Guest House in Pretoria.

The cabinet was the third cabinet in Africa to reach complete gender parity in its composition and the first gender-equal cabinet in South African history. All of its members were affiliated with Ramaphosa's ANC, except for Patricia de Lille, the leader of Good, who was appointed as Minister of Public Works and Infrastructure. De Lille said that her party would remain an opposition party in the National Assembly, her appointment to government notwithstanding.

Ramaphosa reduced the size of the cabinet from 36 to 28 portfolios through the amalgamation of several departments. These changes were:

- The Department of Trade and Industry was combined with the Department of Economic Development.
- The Department of Higher Education and Training was combined with the Department of Science and Technology.
- The Department of Environmental Affairs was combined with the Department of Forestry and Fisheries.
- The Department of Agriculture was combined with the Department of Land Reform and Rural Development.
- The Department of Mineral Resources was combined with the Department of Energy.
- The Department of Human Settlements was combined with the Department of Water and Sanitation.
- The Department of Sports and Recreation was combined with the Department of Arts and Culture.

=== August 2021 reshuffle ===
On 5 August 2021, Ramaphosa announced a major cabinet reshuffle, occasioned by the resignations of Minister Zweli Mkhize and Minister Tito Mboweni and the deaths of Minister Jackson Mthembu and Deputy Minister Bavelile Hlongwa. The reshuffle also involved changes to the security ministries in response to the recent civil unrest.

Most notably, the Ministry of State Security was abolished, and authority for the State Security Agency moved instead to the Presidency, where it was held by a newly appointed Deputy Minister in the Presidency with responsibility for state security. In addition, the Ministry of Human Settlements and Ministry of Water and Sanitation were separated again, after their abortive two-year union as the Ministry of Human Settlements, Water and Sanitation.

=== March 2023 reshuffle ===
On 6 March 2023, Ramaphosa again reshuffled his cabinet, this time in the aftermath of his victory at the ANC's 55th National Conference. The reshuffle was occasioned in large part by the resignation of David Mabuza as Deputy President of South Africa; he was replaced by Paul Mashatile.

Alongside other changes, Ramaphosa created two new Ministers in the Presidency: the Minister in the Presidency for Electricity, with responsibility for the ongoing South African energy crisis, and the Minister in the Presidency for Planning, Monitoring and Evaluation, with responsibility for the Department of Planning, Monitoring and Evaluation.

== 2022 motion of no confidence ==
During his speech at the debate on the State of the Nation Address on 14 February 2022, the Leader of the Opposition, John Steenhuisen of the Democratic Alliance (DA), announced that he had tabled a motion of no confidence in the Cabinet, excluding President Ramaphosa, in terms of Section 102(1) of the Constitution. This was the first time in South African history that a motion of no confidence in the cabinet was tabled.

On 10 March, the Speaker of the National Assembly, Nosiviwe Mapisa-Nqakula, announced that the debate and vote on the motion of no confidence against the Cabinet would be held on 30 March. The DA requested that the vote be held by secret ballot, but Mapisa-Nqakula rejected their request on 25 March. In the vote of 30 March, the motion was defeated in the National Assembly by a margin of 100 votes (131 in favour, 231 opposed and one abstention). The DA, the Economic Freedom Fighters, the United Democratic Movement, the African Transformation Movement, and the Freedom Front Plus voted in favour of the motion, while the ANC, Good, the National Freedom Party, the Inkatha Freedom Party, and Al Jama-ah voted against it.

== List of ministers ==
Parties
African National Congress
Good

Post		Minister	Term		Party
	President of South Africa	His Excellency Cyril Ramaphosa	2018	–	ANC
	Deputy President of South Africa	His Excellency Paul Mashatile	2023	–	ANC
	Deputy President of South Africa	His Excellency David Mabuza	2018	2023	ANC
	Minister in the Presidency	The Hon. Khumbudzo Ntshavheni MP	2023	2024	ANC
'	Minister in the Presidency	The Hon. Mondli Gungubele MP	2021	2023	ANC
'	Minister in the Presidency	The Hon. Jackson Mthembu	2019	2021	ANC
	Minister in the Presidency for Electricity	The Hon. Kgosientso Ramokgopa	2023	2024	ANC
	Minister in the Presidency for Planning, Monitoring and Evaluation	The Hon. Maropene Ramokgopa	2023	2024	ANC
	Minister in the Presidency for Women, Youth and Persons with Disabilities	The Hon. Nkosazana Dlamini-Zuma MP	2023	2024	ANC
	Minister in the Presidency for Women, Youth and Persons with Disabilities	The Hon. Maite Nkoana-Mashabane MP	2019	2023	ANC
	Minister of Agriculture, Land Reform and Rural Development	The Hon. Thoko Didiza MP	2019	2024	ANC
	Minister of Basic Education	The Hon. Angie Motshekga MP	2009	2024	ANC
	Minister of Communications and Digital Technologies	The Hon. Mondli Gungubele MP	2023	2024	ANC
'	Minister of Communications and Digital Technologies	The Hon. Khumbudzo Ntshavheni MP	2021	2023	ANC
'	Minister of Communications and Digital Technologies	The Hon. Stella Ndabeni-Abrahams	2019	2021	ANC
	Minister of Cooperative Governance and Traditional Affairs	The Hon. Thembi Nkadimeng MP	2023	2024	ANC
	Minister of Cooperative Governance and Traditional Affairs	The Hon. Nkosazana Dlamini-Zuma MP	2019	2023	ANC
	Minister of Defence and Military Veterans	The Hon. Thandi Modise	2021	2024	ANC
'	Minister of Defence and Military Veterans	The Hon. Nosiviwe Mapisa-Nqakula MP	2012	2021	ANC
	Minister of Employment and Labour	The Hon. Thulas Nxesi MP	2019	2024	ANC
	Minister of Environment, Forestry and Fisheries	The Hon. Barbara Creecy MP	2019	2024	ANC
	Minister of Finance	The Hon. Enoch Godongwana MP	2021	2024	ANC
'	Minister of Finance	The Hon. Tito Mboweni	2018	2021	ANC
	Minister of Health	The Hon. Joe Phaahla	2021	2024	ANC
'	Minister of Health	The Hon. Zweli Mkhize MP	2019	2021	ANC
	Minister of Higher Education, Science and Technology	The Hon. Blade Nzimande MP	2019	2024	ANC
	Minister of Home Affairs	The Hon. Aaron Motsoaledi MP	2019	2024	ANC
	Minister of Human Settlements	The Hon. Mmamoloko Kubayi MP	2021	2024	ANC
	Minister of Human Settlements, Water and Sanitation	The Hon. Lindiwe Sisulu MP	2019	2021	ANC
	Minister of International Relations and Cooperation	The Hon. Naledi Pandor MP	2019	2024	ANC
	Minister of Justice and Correctional Services	The Hon. Ronald Lamola MP	2019	2024	ANC
	Minister of Mineral Resources and Energy	The Hon. Gwede Mantashe MP	2019	2024	ANC
	Minister of Police	The Hon. Bheki Cele MP	2018	2024	ANC
	Minister of Public Enterprises	The Hon. Pravin Gordhan MP	2018	2024	ANC
	Minister of Public Service and Administration	The Hon. Noxolo Kiviet MP	2023	2024	ANC
'	Minister of Public Service and Administration	The Hon. Ayanda Dlodlo MP	2021	2023	ANC
'	Minister of Public Service and Administration	The Hon. Senzo Mchunu MP	2019	2021	ANC
	Minister of Public Works and Infrastructure	The Hon. Sihle Zikalala MP	2023	2024	ANC
	Minister of Public Works and Infrastructure	The Hon. Patricia de Lille MP	2019	2023	Good
	Minister of Small Business Development	The Hon. Stella Ndabeni-Abrahams MP	2021	2024	ANC
'	Minister of Small Business Development	The Hon. Khumbudzo Ntshavheni MP	2019	2021	ANC
	Minister of Social Development	The Hon. Lindiwe Zulu MP	2019	2024	ANC
	Minister of Sports, Arts and Culture	The Hon. Zizi Kodwa MP	2023	2024	ANC
	Minister of Sports, Arts and Culture	The Hon. Nathi Mthethwa MP	2019	2023	ANC
	Minister of State Security	The Hon. Ayanda Dlodlo MP	2019	2021	ANC
	Minister of Tourism	The Hon. Patricia de Lille MP	2023	2024	Good
'	Minister of Tourism	The Hon. Lindiwe Sisulu MP	2021	2023	ANC
'	Minister of Tourism	The Hon. Mmamoloko Kubayi-Ngubane MP	2019	2021	ANC
	Minister of Trade, Industry and Competition	The Hon. Ebrahim Patel MP	2019	2024	ANC
	Minister of Transport	The Hon. Sindisiwe Chikunga MP	2023	2024	ANC
	Minister of Transport	The Hon. Fikile Mbalula MP	2019	2023	ANC
	Minister of Water and Sanitation	The Hon. Senzo Mchunu MP	2021	2024	ANC

== List of deputy ministers ==
Although deputy ministers are not members of the cabinet, they are appointed by the president and assist cabinet ministers in the execution of their duties. During the term of Ramaphosa's second cabinet, they were, like the cabinet, appointed in May 2019 and reshuffled in August 2021 and March 2023.

The Ministries of Human Settlements, Water and Sanitation; Water and Sanitation; International Relations and Cooperation; Trade, Industry and Competition; Cooperative Governance and Traditional Affairs; and Agriculture, Land Reform and Rural Development all had two deputy ministers throughout their tenure. In addition, in 2021, Ramaphosa appointed a second Deputy Minister in the Presidency without portfolio, in addition to the specialised Deputy Ministers in the Presidency (the Deputy Minister in the Presidency for Women, Youth and Persons with Disabilities; the Deputy Minister in the Presidency for State Security from 2021 to 2023; and the Deputy Minister in the Presidency for Planning, Monitoring and Evaluation from 2023). The Deputy Minister in the Presidency for Electricity did not have a deputy.

Post	Deputy Minister	Term		Party
Deputy Minister in the Presidency 1st	Nomasonto Motaung	2023	2024	ANC
Deputy Minister in the Presidency 1st	Thembi Siweya	2019	2023	ANC
Deputy Minister in the Presidency 2nd	Kenneth Morolong	2023	2024	ANC
Deputy Minister in the Presidency 2nd	Pinky Kekana	2021	2023	ANC
Deputy Minister in the Presidency for Planning, Monitoring and Evaluation	Pinky Kekana	2023	2024	ANC
Deputy Minister in the Presidency for State Security	Zizi Kodwa	2021	2023	ANC
Deputy Minister in the Presidency for Women, Youth and Persons with Disabilities	Sisisi Tolashe	2023	2024	ANC
Deputy Minister in the Presidency for Women, Youth and Persons with Disabilities	Hlengiwe Mkhize	2019	2021	ANC
Deputy Minister of Agriculture, Land Reform and Rural Development 1st	Rosemary Capa	2021	2024	ANC
Deputy Minister of Agriculture, Land Reform and Rural Development 1st	Sdumo Dlamini	2019	2021	ANC
Deputy Minister of Agriculture, Land Reform and Rural Development 2nd	Mcebisi Skwatsha	2019	2024	ANC
Deputy Minister of Basic Education	Reginah Mhaule	2019	2024	ANC
Deputy Minister of Communications and Digital Technologies	Philly Mapulane	2021	2024	ANC
Deputy Minister of Communications and Digital Technologies	Pinky Kekana	2019	2021	ANC
Deputy Minister of Cooperative Governance and Traditional Affairs 1st	Parks Tau	2023	2024	ANC
Deputy Minister of Cooperative Governance and Traditional Affairs 1st	Thembi Nkadimeng	2021	2023	ANC
Deputy Minister of Cooperative Governance and Traditional Affairs 1st	Parks Tau	2019	2020	ANC
Deputy Minister of Cooperative Governance and Traditional Affairs 2nd	Zolile Burns-Ncamashe	2023	2024	ANC
Deputy Minister of Cooperative Governance and Traditional Affairs 2nd	Obed Bapela	2019	2023	ANC
Deputy Minister of Correctional Services	Patekile Holomisa	2019	2024	ANC
Deputy Minister of Defence and Military Veterans	Thabang Makwetla	2019	2024	ANC
Deputy Minister of Employment and Labour	Boitumelo Moloi	2019	2024	ANC
Deputy Minister of Environment, Forestry and Fisheries	Maggie Sotyu	2019	2024	ANC
Deputy Minister of Finance	David Masondo	2019	2024	ANC
Deputy Minister of Health	Sibongiseni Dhlomo	2021	2024	ANC
Deputy Minister of Health	Joe Phaahla	2019	2021	ANC
Deputy Minister of Higher Education, Science and Technology	Buti Manamela	2019	2024	ANC
Deputy Minister of Home Affairs	Njabulo Nzuza	2019	2024	ANC
Deputy Minister of Human Settlements	Pam Tshwete	2021	2024	ANC
Deputy Minister of Human Settlements, Water and Sanitation 1st	Pam Tshwete	2019	2021	ANC
Deputy Minister of Human Settlements, Water and Sanitation 2nd	David Mahlobo	2019	2021	ANC
Deputy Minister of International Relations and Cooperation 1st	Alvin Botes	2019	2024	ANC
Deputy Minister of International Relations and Cooperation 2nd	Candith Mashego-Dlamini	2019	2024	ANC
Deputy Minister of Justice and Constitutional Development	John Jeffery	2019	2024	ANC
Deputy Minister of Mineral Resources and Energy	Nobuhle Nkabane	2021	2024	ANC
Deputy Minister of Mineral Resources and Energy	Bavelile Hlongwa	2019	2019	ANC
Deputy Minister of Police	Cassel Mathale	2019	2024	ANC
Deputy Minister of Public Enterprises	Obed Bapela	2023	2024	ANC
Deputy Minister of Public Enterprises	Phumulo Masualle	2019	2023	ANC
Deputy Minister of Public Service and Administration	Chana Pilane-Majake	2021	2024	ANC
Deputy Minister of Public Service and Administration	Sindy Chikunga	2019	2021	ANC
Deputy Minister of Public Works and Infrastructure	Bernice Swarts	2023	2024	ANC
Deputy Minister of Public Works and Infrastructure	Noxolo Kiviet	2019	2023	ANC
Deputy Minister of Small Business Development	Dipuo Peters	2023	2024	ANC
Deputy Minister of Small Business Development	Sdumo Dlamini	2021	2023	ANC
Deputy Minister of Small Business Development	Rosemary Capa	2019	2021	ANC
Deputy Minister of Social Development	Hendrietta Bogopane-Zulu	2019	2024	ANC
Deputy Minister of Sports, Arts and Culture	Nocawe Mafu	2019	2024	ANC
Deputy Minister of State Security	Zizi Kodwa	2019	2021	ANC
Deputy Minister of Tourism	Fish Mahlalela	2019	2024	ANC
Deputy Minister of Trade, Industry and Competition 1st	Fikile Majola	2019	2024	ANC
Deputy Minister of Trade, Industry and Competition 2nd	Nomalungelo Gina	2019	2024	ANC
Deputy Minister of Transport	Lisa Mangcu	2023	2024	ANC
Deputy Minister of Transport	Sindy Chikunga	2021	2023	ANC
Deputy Minister of Transport	Dikeledi Magadzi	2019	2021	ANC
Deputy Minister of Water and Sanitation 1st	David Mahlobo	2021	2024	ANC
Deputy Minister of Water and Sanitation 2nd	Judith Tshabalala	2023	2024	ANC
Deputy Minister of Water and Sanitation 2nd	Dikeledi Magadzi	2021	2023	ANC

== See also ==
- Cabinet of South Africa
- Shadow Cabinet of Mmusi Maimane
- Shadow Cabinet of John Steenhuisen
