= Thoko Didiza =

South African politician (born 1965)

The Honourable Thoko Didiza MP
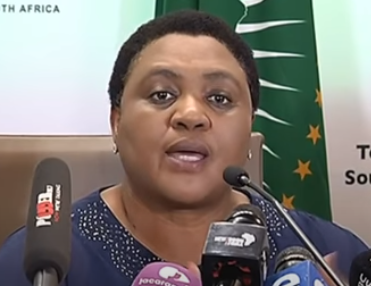
- Didiza in 2019

8th Speaker of the National Assembly
- Incumbent
- Assumed office 14 June 2024
- Deputy: Annelie Lotriet
- Preceded by: Lechesa Tsenoli (acting); Nosiviwe Mapisa-Nqakula

Minister of Agriculture, Land Reform and Rural Development
- In office 30 May 2019 – 14 June 2024
- President: Cyril Ramaphosa
- Deputy: Mcebisi Skwatsha; Sdumo Dlamini; Rosemary Capa
- Preceded by: Portfolio established

Member of the National Assembly
- Incumbent
- Assumed office 21 May 2014
- In office 9 May 1994 – 26 September 2008

Minister of Public Works
- In office 22 May 2006 – 25 September 2008
- President: Thabo Mbeki
- Deputy: Ntopile Kganyago
- Preceded by: Stella Sigcau
- Succeeded by: Geoff Doidge

Minister of Agriculture and Land Affairs
- In office 17 June 1999 – 22 May 2006
- President: Thabo Mbeki
- Deputy: Dirk du Toit
- Preceded by: Derek Hanekom
- Succeeded by: Lulama Xingwana

Deputy Minister of Agriculture
- In office May 1994 – June 1999
- President: Nelson Mandela
- Minister: Kraai van Niekerk; Derek Hanekom
- Succeeded by: Dirk du Toit

Personal details
- Born: Angela Thokozile Msane; 2 June 1965 (age 61) Durban, Natal Province; South Africa
- Party: African National Congress
- Spouse: Tami Didiza (m. 1995)
- Education: Ohlange School; University of South Africa; University of Melbourne

Angela Thokozile Didiza (née Msane; born 2 June 1965) is a South African politician serving as Speaker of the National Assembly since 14 June 2024. A member of the African National Congress (ANC), she was formerly the Minister of Agriculture, Land Reform and Rural Development between May 2019 and June 2024. She served an earlier stint in the cabinet between 1999 and 2008.

Didiza entered politics through anti-apartheid activism, initially in Christian organisations and women's groups. She was the inaugural secretary-general of the Women's National Coalition from 1992 to 1994. She was elected to the first post-apartheid Parliament as a nominee of the ANC Youth League in 1994, and she joined Nelson Mandela's Government of National Unity as Deputy Minister of Agriculture from 1994 to 1999. A political ally of Mandela's successor, President Thabo Mbeki, she subsequently became a rising star in Mbeki's cabinet, serving as Minister of Agriculture and Land Affairs from June 1999 to May 2006 and Minister of Public Works from May 2006 to September 2008.

She was among the several ministers who resigned in the aftermath of Mbeki's recall by the ANC in September 2008. After a hiatus from frontline politics between 2008 and 2014, Didiza returned to Parliament in 2014 as a house chairperson in the National Assembly, a position she held throughout the fifth democratic Parliament. During that period, she stood unsuccessfully as the ANC's candidate for election as Mayor of Tshwane in the 2016 municipal elections; her nomination led to several days of riots by ANC supporters in the city.

She returned to the cabinet as Minister of Agriculture, Land Reform and Rural Development after the 2019 general election, appointed by President Cyril Ramaphosa. After the next general election in 2024, she was elected as Speaker of the National Assembly.

Didiza was first elected to the ANC National Executive Committee in 1997. She was a member of the committee from 1997 to 2007 and from 2012 to the present. Her absence from the committee between 2007 and 2012 followed the ANC's Polokwane conference, at which she launched an abortive bid to become ANC deputy secretary-general on a slate of candidates aligned to Mbeki.

== Early life and education ==
Didiza was born on 2 June 1965 in Durban in the former Natal Province. She was the youngest of three children born to Vusimuzi and Assiena Ntombenhle Msane, and her mother was from a family of small-scale farmers in present-day Mpumalanga. Didiza attended the Ohlange School in Inanda, founded by John Dube of the African National Congress (ANC). During her matric year in 1981, she met Phumzile Mlambo, who was later the first woman Deputy President of South Africa; Mlambo became a close friend and political mentor to Didiza.

Though Didiza had no tertiary education during her apartheid-era activism, she completed several postgraduate diplomas, including one in journalism. After the end of apartheid, she completed three degrees: a Bachelor of Arts in politics and sociology (2003) and Honours in politics (2007) from the University of South Africa, and a Master's in tertiary education management from the University of Melbourne.

== Early career and activism ==
Didiza worked as a legal secretary for Mafika Mbuli, a Natal lawyer, until 1985, when she became a secretary and then a programme officer for the Diakonia Ecumenical Church Agency. Having entered politics through the church, she was involved in the leadership of the Natal Women's Organisation, as well as in the underground structures of the ANC, which at the time was banned inside South Africa. In 1987, she was a member of a women's delegation to a meeting at the ANC's exile headquarters in Lusaka, Zambia, where, she later recalled, a senior member chastised her for passing notes to fellow activist Brigitte Mabandla.

In 1989, Didiza moved to Vosloorus on the East Rand to work as the national youth coordinator for the South African Council of the Young Women's Christian Association (YWCA). While working for the YWCA until 1992, she also worked in different capacities for the South African Council of Churches (SACC), then a prominent anti-apartheid organisation based in Johannesburg. She used the council's platform to canvass for the ANC and worked on its humanitarian and public relations programmes. During the negotiations to end apartheid, she was a member of the National Co-ordinating Committee for the Repatriation of South African Exiles, chaired by Frank Chikane of the SACC, which made arrangements for the reception of political exiles returning to South Africa.

Didiza also continued her women's activism, and she was the inaugural secretary-general of the Women's National Coalition from 1992 to 1994. In addition, after the ANC was unbanned, she became active in the newly established ANC Youth League, which nominated her to stand as an ANC candidate in the first post-apartheid elections in April 1994.

== Career in government ==
=== Deputy Minister of Agriculture: 1994–1999 ===
After Didiza's election to the National Assembly in 1994, newly elected President Nelson Mandela appointed her to the first post-apartheid government as Deputy Minister of Agriculture. Still in her 20s, she was the youngest minister or deputy minister in the government, and Mark Gevisser of the Mail & Guardian suspected that the ANC Youth League had lobbied for her appointment. She held the office throughout Mandela's single term as president. Upon taking office, Didiza said that she knew "only four things about agriculture", learned during her early childhood on her grandmother's small farm: "You plant, you grow, you eat, and what you don’t eat you try to sell." In addition, her portfolio was widely viewed as politically precarious, but she was viewed as having "handled the difficult job with great success".

Until 1996, she deputised Kraai van Niekerk, who represented the National Party in the Government of National Unity, and, despite their differing political backgrounds, the pair reportedly worked well together. Didiza was tasked with reforming the credit system for farmers, and she also launched the Broadening Access to Agriculture Thrust (BATAT) programme, which she described as "a strategy to force change in the department" and to "enable the department to understand its new role of supporting and encouraging new entrants to the sector". The ministry under Didiza and van Niekerk was also noted for intermittently coming into conflict with Derek Hanekom, the Minister of Land Affairs, whose portfolio sometimes competed with theirs. In 1996, after van Niekerk and the National Party exited the government, Hanekom became Didiza's boss at the head of the newly amalgamated Ministry of Agriculture and Land Affairs.

In parallel to her government career, Didiza continued to rise through the ANC, though with a low public profile. Early in the legislative term, she was co-opted onto the ANC's National Executive Committee, the party's senior leadership structure. She was directly elected onto the committee for the first time at the ANC's 50th National Conference in Mafikeng December 1997; she was one of only two ANC Youth League members to gain election.

=== Minister of Agriculture and Land Affairs: 1999–2006 ===
In June 1999, after the 1999 general election, Didiza was promoted to the cabinet of newly elected President Thabo Mbeki; she replaced Hanekom as Minister of Agriculture and Land Affairs. By the end of the year, Didiza had demonstrated a different focus to Hanekom, reversing his emphasis on small black farming to promote black commercial farming instead. She was admired for building relationships between government and disparate interest groups, such as AgriSA, and, though the pace of land reform remained slow, there was a marked acceleration in the 2002–2004 period. Her ministry convened the National Land Summit on land reform in July 2005. There, Didiza argued that land restitution was obstructed by the prevailing market-based approach, especially the "willing buyer, willing seller" approach to determining the price of land.

Didiza was reputed as a political ally and protégé of President Mbeki, and Mbeki's biographer described her as a "loyal Mbeki-ite". At the ANC's 51st National Conference in December 2002, which re-elected Mbeki as ANC president, Didiza was re-elected to the National Executive Committee; by number of votes received, she was the fourth-most popular candidate, behind only Trevor Manuel, Cyril Ramaphosa, and Nkosazana Dlamini-Zuma. In addition, she was named as one of the World Economic Forum's Young Global Leaders in 2005.

=== Minister of Public Works: 2006–2008 ===
On 22 May 2006, Mbeki announced a minor reshuffle in which Didiza was named as Minister of Public Works. She succeeded Stella Sigcau, who had died in office. During her tenure, in 2008, she introduced the controversial Expropriation Bill, which expanded the state's powers to expropriate private property for public purpose in the public interest. The bill was withdrawn due to constitutional concerns, but subsequent versions of it were debated in Parliament for over a decade thereafter.

==== Polokwane conference ====
In 2007, Mbeki faced strong competition against his bid for re-election to a third term as ANC president. In the party's internal elections, Didiza stood for a top position on a slate of candidates aligned to Mbeki, in her case for election as ANC deputy secretary-general. The ANC Women's League did not support her candidacy, nominating Baleka Mbete for the position instead.

When the ANC's 52nd National Conference was held in Polokwane in December 2007, Jacob Zuma and his supporters beat Mbeki's camp in all the top leadership races. Thandi Modise was elected as deputy secretary-general in a landslide, receiving 2,304 votes against Didiza's 1,455. Didiza also failed to gain re-election to an ordinary seat on the ANC National Executive Committee.

==== Resignation ====
In the political fall-out from the ANC's Polokwane conference, the party asked Mbeki to resign from the national presidency. Didiza was among the 11 cabinet ministers who submitted their own resignation on 23 September 2008 in the aftermath of Mbeki's announcement. The ANC's leadership later said that Didiza had agreed that she would be willing to return to her ministerial portfolio in the cabinet of Mbeki's successor, President Kgalema Motlanthe; however, when Motlanthe announced his cabinet, Didiza was replaced by Geoff Doidge. She also resigned from the National Assembly, ceding her seat to Papi Moloto on 26 September.

=== Political hiatus: 2008–2014 ===
Although Didiza was initially listed as one of the ANC's candidates in the 2009 general election, she did not stand and was absent from Parliament throughout the fourth democratic Parliament. During this period, from 2011 to 2014, she was employed by the University of South Africa, working as a consultant on the launch of the Archie Mafeje Research Institute on Applied Social Policy.

Meanwhile, she embarked on what became a "remarkable comeback", which began in 2012 when the Provincial Executive Committee of the ANC in Limpopo proclaimed its support for her return to the National Executive Committee. At the ANC's next national conference, held in Mangaung in December that year, she was elected to the committee, ranked ninth of the 80 ordinary members elected. In the 2014 general election, she was one of the top candidates for the ANC, ranked 15th on the national party list, and she was therefore a possible contender for an appointment to President Zuma's second-term cabinet. By this time, she was viewed as having been politically "rehabilitated" as a former Mbeki ally.

=== National Assembly: 2014–2019 ===
After the 2014 election, Didiza returned to a seat in the National Assembly but was not appointed to cabinet. Instead, she was elected as a presiding officer, serving alongside Mmatlala Boroto and Cedric Frolick as one of the National Assembly's three house chairpersons. She was house chairperson with responsibility for internal arrangements, and she was generally popular in that role. In addition, she was elected for a three-year term as chairperson of the African region of Commonwealth Women Parliamentarians in 2016; and she was re-elected to the ANC National Executive Committee, ranked 15th, at the ANC's next elective conference in December 2017.

==== Tshwane mayoral candidacy ====
On 20 June 2016, the ANC announced that Didiza would be its candidate for election as Mayor of Tshwane in the municipal elections later that year. She would remain in her parliamentary seat unless and until she was elected as mayor. However, her candidacy was highly controversial. At the time, the ANC in Tshwane was divided in a factional struggle between the outgoing mayor, Sputla Ramokgopa, and his deputy, Mapiti Matsena. The provincial ANC could not agree on a candidate and deferred to the National Executive Committee, which proposed Didiza as a "compromise candidate". In addition to this factional dynamic – and in addition to an unprecedented threat to the ANC's dominance by opposition parties – some ANC supporters objected to Didiza's nomination because she was not native to Tshwane and therefore was viewed as a "fly-in candidate". The ANC pointed out that she had lived in Tshwane since 1994 and was active in a local party branch in Pretoria.

Nonetheless, protests against Didiza's candidacy turned into several days of riots, which resulted in at least five deaths and dozens of arrests. In the aftermath of the violence, Didiza said:

I've never and I still do not feel foreign in Tshwane. Even with the latest incidents which I don't think reflect the feelings of the community of Tshwane. I therefore don't in any way feel alienated. I feel part of that community.

The ANC Women's League backed Didiza, with league president Bathabile Dlamini condemning her critics as purveyors of patriarchy and tribalism. However, President Zuma suggested in retrospect that Didiza's nomination had been a mistake. When the elections were held in August, the ANC lost its majority in Tshwane for the first time since the end of apartheid. Didiza said that the result was "no surprise", given how hotly contested the municipality was. Because the ANC was not able to install her as mayor, she remained in the National Assembly.

==== Constitutional amendment committee ====
In February 2019, Didiza was elected as chairperson of the ad hoc parliamentary committee established to redraft the so-called property clause in Section 25 of the Constitution, with the purpose of explicitly sanctioning land expropriation without compensation. The committee did not complete its work before the end of the fifth Parliament later that year, and it later reconvened under the chairmanship of Mathole Motshekga.

=== Minister of Agriculture, Land Reform and Rural Development: 2019–2024 ===
In the 2019 general election, Didiza was re-elected to the National Assembly, ranked 12th on the ANC's national party list. Although she was viewed as a frontrunner to succeed Baleka Mbete as Speaker of the National Assembly, she was instead appointed to the cabinet of President Cyril Ramaphosa, named to her earlier (now renamed) portfolio as Minister of Agriculture, Land Reform and Rural Development. Sdumo Dlamini and Mcebisi Skwatsha were appointed as her deputies. Her appointment was broadly welcomed by civil society, and her first task was to oversee the merger of the Department of Land Reform and Rural Development with the Department of Agriculture. Months after she took office, there was an outbreak of foot-and-mouth disease in South Africa, and her ministry was criticised for its slow response.

Also in 2019, at a meeting in Addis Ababa, Ethiopia, Didiza was elected to chair the African Union's Specialised Technical Committee on Agriculture, Rural Development, Water and Environment. At the ANC's 55th National Conference in December 2022, she was re-elected to the ANC National Executive Committee, ranked 35th of the 80 ordinary members. She did not stand for higher party office at the conference, despite speculation that she was well positioned to do so, particularly as a young female ally of President Ramaphosa.

=== Speaker of the National Assembly: 2024–present ===
On 14 June 2024, Didiza was elected Speaker of the National Assembly of South Africa during the first sitting of the 28th Parliament of South Africa. She defeated the Economic Freedom Fighters' Veronica Mente with 284 votes to 49.

== Personal life ==
Didiza remained a practicing Christian. During her hiatus from government, she ran an eatery in central Pretoria named Thoko's Kitchen, and she is a longstanding member of the board of the Thabo Mbeki Foundation.

On 16 June 1995, she married Tami Didiza, who was then a civil servant and later became a businessman. They have five children; in 2000, while Agriculture and Land Affairs Minister, Didiza had her fourth child, becoming the first South African politician to give birth while serving in the cabinet.

Political offices
Preceded by Derek Hanekom	Minister of Agriculture and Land Affairs; 1999 – 2006	Succeeded by Lulama Xingwana
