= Lulama Xingwana =

South African politician (born 1955)

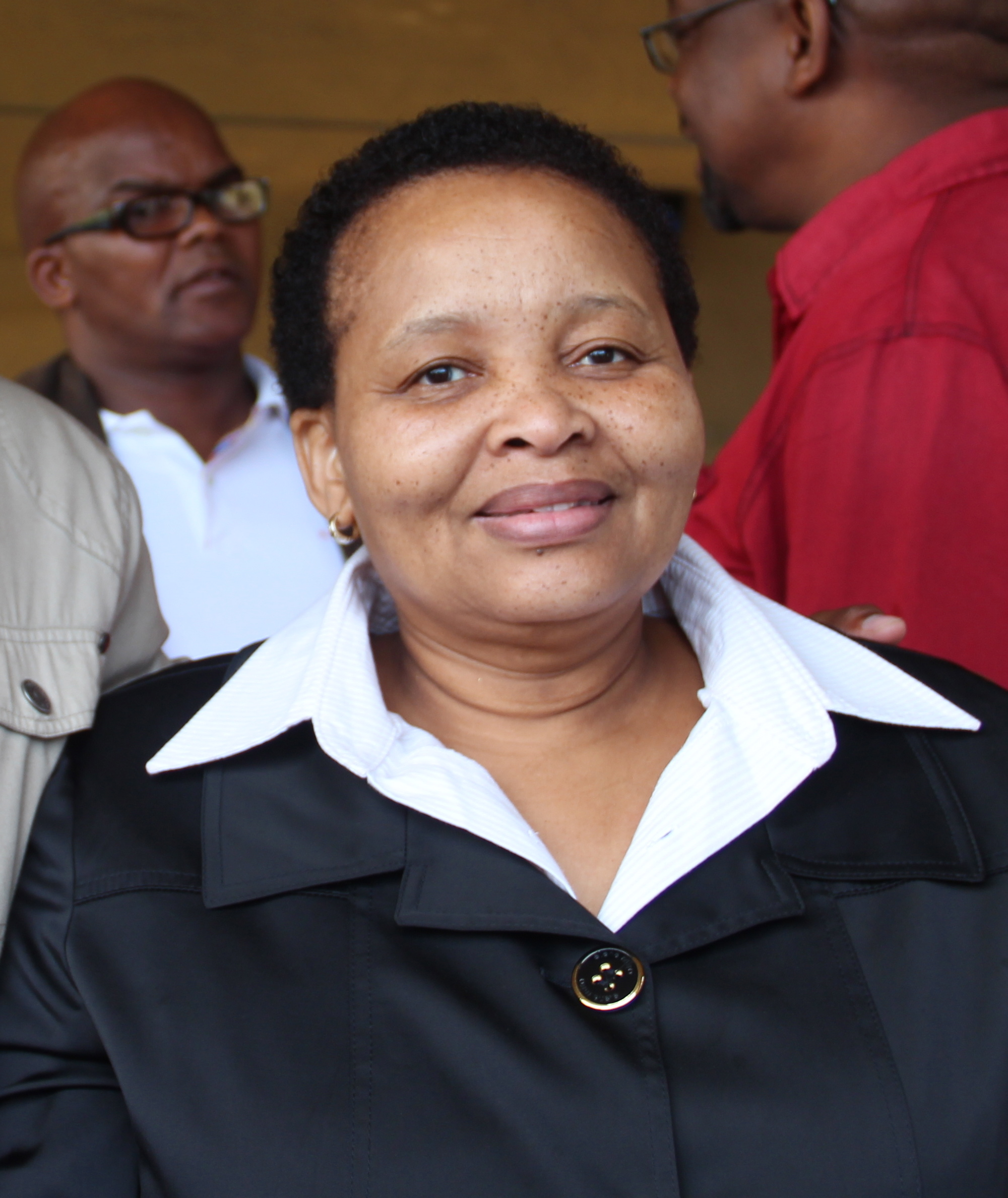

Minister for Women, Children and Persons with Disabilities
- In office 1 November 2010 – 26 May 2014
- Preceded by: Noluthando Mayende-Sibiya
- Succeeded by: Susan Shabangu

Minister of Arts and Culture
- In office 11 May 2009 – 30 October 2010
- Preceded by: Pallo Jordan
- Succeeded by: Paul Mashatile

Minister of Agriculture and Land Affairs
- In office 2006–2009
- Preceded by: Thoko Didiza
- Succeeded by: Tina Joemat-Peterson/Gugile Nkwinti

Member of Parliament
- Incumbent
- Assumed office 1994

Personal details
- Born: 23 September 1955 (age 70)
- Party: African National Congress

Lulama "Lulu" Marytheresa Xingwana (born 23 September 1955) is a South African politician who served as Minister for Women, Children and People with Disabilities from November 2010 to May 2014. Previously she held the position of Deputy Minister of Minerals and Energy from 2004 to 2006, was Minister of Agriculture and Land Affairs from 2006 to 2009, succeeding Thoko Didiza, and was Minister of Arts and Culture, 2009–2010.

== Education ==
Xingwana obtained a Bachelor of Science degree from the University of the Witwatersrand in 1985 and three postgraduate diplomas, one in Economic Principles from the University of Limpopo in 2002, and the other two in Development and Leadership Studies, and Rural Development from the University of Zimbabwe in Zimbabwe.

== Political career ==
Xingwana became a Member of Parliament after the 1994 South African elections. She is currently also chairperson of the Southern African Development Community's Regional Women's Caucus and director of the South African Council of Churches' Women's Development Programmes (1987). She has chaired the Joint Monitoring Committee for the Improvement of Quality of Life and Status of Women (2002–2004), the Parliamentary Women's Caucus (1999–2004), the Malibongwe Rural Development Project for Women (1998–2000) and the National Assembly Portfolio Committee for Sports and Recreation (1994–1999). She has been a tutor of Classes for Domestic Workers in rural areas and the suburbs of Johannesburg, as well as for Learn and Teach, since 1985. From 1999 to 2004, she was on the National Assembly Portfolio Committee for Defence. She was also on the ANC's Provincial Executive Council for Gauteng (1998–2001) and the National Assembly Portfolio Committee: Environmental Affairs and Tourism (1996–2004), Head of Development for the ANC Women's League (1991–1994) and a member of FEDSWA (1981–1991). Her membership to the United Democratic Front lasted from 1983 until 1991, and she has been a member of the ANC Women's League since 1993.

Xingwana has spoken of her opposition to the return of capital punishment in South Africa stating that "it is against our ethos of human rights" and the democratic values of the country.

== Controversy ==
In her appointment as Agriculture and Land Affairs Minister, Xingwana caused controversy in 2007 when she accused white farmers of being cruel and inhumane towards their workers. She claimed that farmers regularly "rape and assault" their workers. These statements enraged many farmers, and two farm unions, AgriSA and the Transvaal Agricultural Union, challenged her to provide evidence that would support her accusations. The minister called for a meeting with the unions, but the farmers walked out in protest. Former President Thabo Mbeki was called in to resolve the dispute.

=== Executive toilet ===
In April 2009, a report in the newspaper Rapport repeated details found by one of its readers in a three-page Land Affairs document of a special mobile toilet, imported at R500,000, for Xingwana's exclusive use while handing over land in various parts of the country. Its specifications were said to include gold trimmings, but Xingwana's spokesperson denied the claim, declaring that, although Xingwana did indeed have a specially-reserved toilet, it was no different from those which played host to the hoi polloi.

=== Homophobic remarks ===
In March 2010, Lulu Xingwana stormed out of an art exhibition that she was attending in her capacity of minister of Arts and Culture, calling the work "immoral". The works included pieces by one of the most acclaimed photographers in the world, Zanele Muholi. It was alleged by an anonymous insider that Xingwana had objected to the display of same-sex couples, but the official reason provided through her spokesperson was that "It was immoral, offensive and going against nation-building."

=== Designer furniture procurement ===
In early February 2013, it was reported that Xingwana spent R2.1 million on refurnishing the department of Women, Children and People with Disabilities head office with new designer furniture. Nearly half of that amount was spent on custom-made furniture for her own office. Xingwana was accused by opposition parties of using public resources to indulge in her own "extravagant taste in furniture and overseas trips" instead of defending the rights of vulnerable South Africans, which her department is responsible for.

=== Afrikaner-domestic violence remarks ===
On 26 February 2013, Xingwana stated on the Australian news channel ABC News: "Young Afrikaner men are brought up in the Calvinist religion believing that they own a woman, they own a child, they own everything and therefore they can take that life because they own it."

After making the remarks, she was accused by civil rights organisation AfriForum of discriminating "on the basis of race, faith and gender", and that this was "an extreme verbal attack on the integrity of Afrikaners." The Christian Democratic Party called for the president to fire her. The Afrikanerbond stated that her comments were an "extreme verbal attack on the integrity of Afrikaners" and speculated that she made the statement in an attempt to divert attention away from reports detailing mismanagement within her department.

The following day Xingwana retracted her remarks and publicly apologised "unconditionally".

Political offices
Preceded by Thoko Didiza	Minister of Agriculture and Land Affairs; 2006–2009	Succeeded by Tina Joemat-Peterson as Minister of Agriculture, Forestry and Fisheries
Preceded by Thoko Didiza	Minister of Agriculture and Land Affairs; 2006–2009	Succeeded by Gugile Nkwinti as Minister of Rural Development and Land Reform
Preceded by Pallo Jordan	Minister of Arts and Culture; 10 May 2009–31 October 2010	Succeeded by Paul Mashatile
