= Department of Agriculture and Land Affairs =

Department of Agriculture and Land Affairs may refer to one of the following:

- Minister of Agriculture and Land Affairs, a former ministerial position in the Cabinet of South Africa
- Department of Agriculture, Forestry and Fisheries (South Africa), a South African government department formerly called the Department of Agriculture
- Department of Rural Development and Land Reform, a South African government department formerly called the Department of Land Affairs
