= Ramaphosa cabinet =

Ramaphosa cabinet may refer to:

- First Cabinet of Cyril Ramaphosa, the South African ANC majority government led by Cyril Ramaphosa from 2018 to 2019
- Second Cabinet of Cyril Ramaphosa, the South African ANC majority government led by Cyril Ramaphosa from the 2019 to 2024
- Third Cabinet of Cyril Ramaphosa, the incumbent South African national unity government led by Cyril Ramaphosa since 2024
