= Kraai van Niekerk =

South African politician (born 1938)

André Isak van Niekerk PhD

Minister of Agriculture
- In office 1990–1996
- President: F. W. de Klerk; Nelson Mandela

Personal details
- Born: 1938 (age 87–88) Eshowe, KwaZulu-Natal
- Education: University of Stellenbosch
- Nickname: Kraai

André Isak "Kraai" van Niekerk (born 1938) is a South African former politician.

He obtained a Ph.D. in Agriculture at the University of Stellenbosch, and then worked in several research positions before settling down in Rugseer near Kenhardt as a sheep farmer.

Van Niekerk embarked on a political career for the National Party when he was elected MP for Prieska in 1981. He became Deputy Minister of Agriculture in the cabinet of P.W. Botha in 1986. F. W. de Klerk appointed him Minister of Agriculture in 1990.

He and Dr. Dawie de Villiers were the only ministers of the last apartheid government to keep their posts in the Government of National Unity under President Nelson Mandela (until the end of the GNU in 1996).

For some time, he was also the National Party's Chairman in the Northern Cape. He retired from parliament in 1997 to join Louis Luyt's Federal Alliance before the elections in 1999. After the 1999 elections, he became part of the two-member caucus of the FA, which entered into an alliance with the Democratic Alliance.

After the elections in 2004 he became Spokesperson on Agriculture of the DA caucus in the National Assembly. Van Niekerk, who is a member of AgriSA, has represented not less than three parties in the South African parliament. He is married to Theresa and the couple have three children.

Political offices
Preceded by Greyling Wentzel	Minister of Agriculture; 1990 – 1996	Succeeded by Derek Hanekom as Minister of Agriculture and Land Affairs
