= Aquaculture in South Africa =

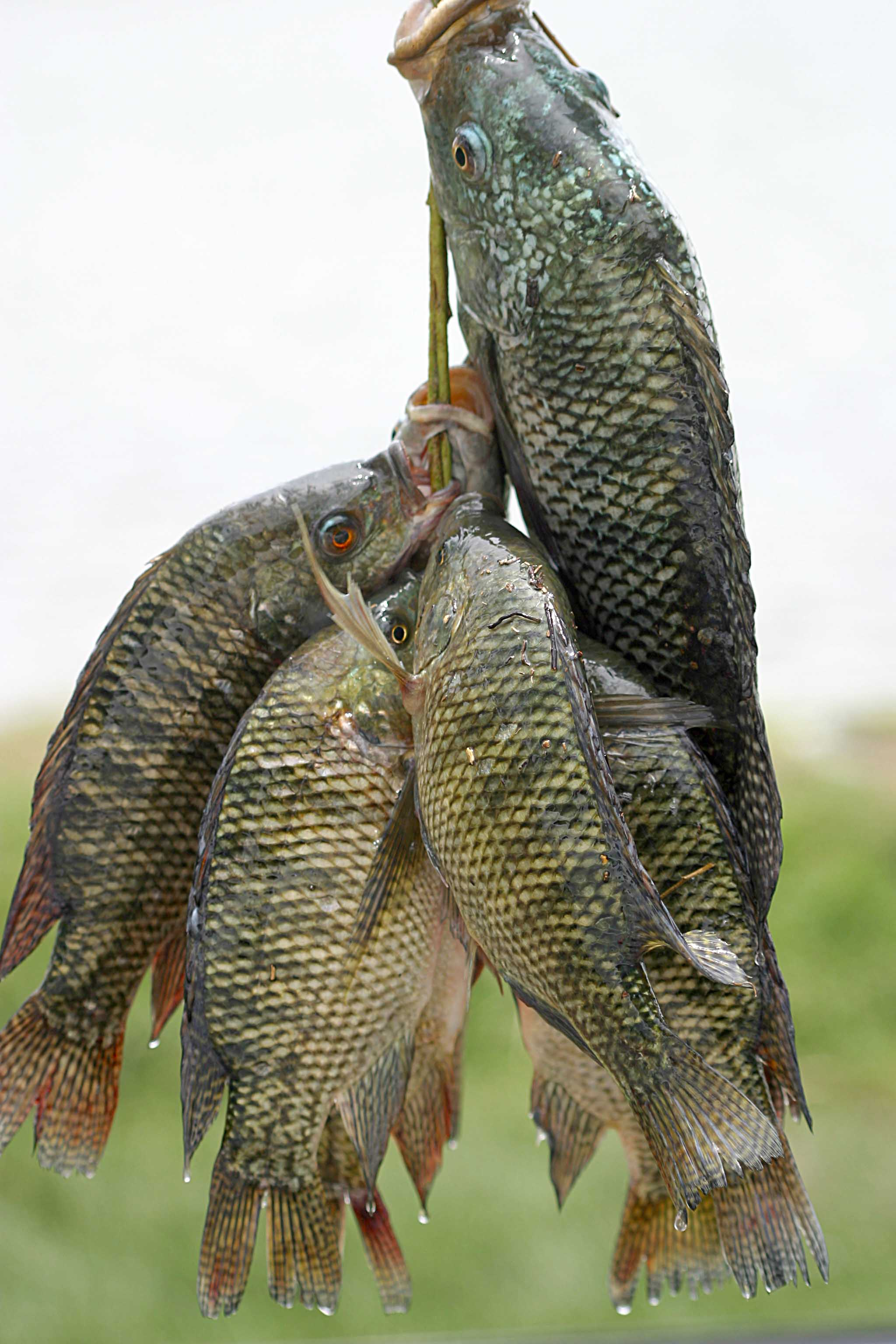
The adaptable tilapia is a commonly farmed fish in South Africa

South Africa has an emerging aquaculture. It consists mainly of culture of freshwater species such as crocodiles, trout, catfish, tilapia, and ornamental fish as well as marine species such as abalone, prawns, oysters, and mussels.

== Overview ==
According to the Department of Agriculture, Forestry and Fisheries, "Aquaculture in South Africa is divided into freshwater aquaculture and marine aquaculture. Freshwater fish culture is severely limited by the supply of suitable water. The most important areas for the production of freshwater species are the Limpopo, Mpumalanga Lowveld, and Northern Kwazulu–Natal. Trout is farmed along the high mountain in Lydenburg area, Kwazulu-Natal Drakensberg, and the Western Cape. Other freshwater species cultivated on a small scale include catfish, freshwater crayfish and tilapia species. Marine aquaculture is a fast developing sector, with a focus on mussels, oysters, abalone, seaweeds, and prawns. Of these, mussel farming is the best established. Abalone culture is now well established, centred in the Hermanus area on the Cape south coast. There is also an experimental offshore farm (cage culture) off Gansbaai for salmon."

Export data from the Department of Agriculture, Forestry and Fisheries indicate that the South African industry is dominated by the Western Cape province, which accounts for more than 80% of all South African aquaculture produce, followed by the Eastern Cape at a distant 12.75%.

The Department of Trade and Industry states in its sector diagnostic study, that national aquaculture production data (2003–2006) in 2003 was 3,485 tons and in 2006 was 3,564 tons which had a value of R210. Abalone accounted for the biggest increase with production increasing by 61% from 515 tons in 2003, to 833 tons in 2006. Declines in production were experienced by the following sub-sectors: oyster, mussel, and trout with reductions in production of 19.2%, 39.5%, and 18.4% respectively.

== Position of the South African industry in relation to the global industry ==
The industry in South Africa is in its infancy, with production volumes being very low, even compared to its continental peers where Egypt and Nigeria lead the pack.

== Government policy and support towards the sector ==
Aquaculture has been identified as a critical industry, due to the popularity of its produce and the declining yields world-wide. In South Africa, Aquaculture has been identified as part of the key industries for promotion in line with the country’s Industrial Policy Action Plan II (IPAP II). The Department of Agriculture, Forestry and Fisheries is also lending its support to the sector and encouraging collaboration with stakeholders across the sector.

== Role players ==
Overarching Aquaculture Sector Association
- Aquaculture Association of Southern Africa (AASA)

Website: www.aasa-aqua.co.za

Relevant government departments
- Department of Science and Technology (DST)

Website: www.dst.gov.za/

- Department of Trade and industry

Website: www.thedti.gov.za

- Department of Agriculture, Fisheries and Forestry

Website: www.daff.gov.za/
