= Pam Tshwete =

South African politician

The Honourable Pamela Tshwete MP

Deputy Minister of Human Settlements
- Incumbent
- Assumed office 5 August 2021
- President: Cyril Ramaphosa
- Minister: Mmamoloko Kubayi
- Preceded by: Portfolio re-established

Member of the National Assembly
- Incumbent
- Assumed office 2002

Deputy Minister of Human Settlements, Water and Sanitation
- In office 30 May 2019 – 5 August 2021 Serving with David Mahlobo
- President: Cyril Ramaphosa
- Minister: Lindiwe Sisulu
- Preceded by: Portfolio established
- Succeeded by: Portfolio abolished

Deputy Minister of Water and Sanitation
- In office 26 May 2014 – 7 May 2019
- President: Jacob Zuma; Cyril Ramaphosa
- Minister: Nomvula Mokonyane; Gugile Nkwinti
- Preceded by: Portfolio established
- Succeeded by: Portfolio merged

Deputy Minister of Rural Development and Land Reform
- In office 10 July 2013 – 25 May 2014
- President: Jacob Zuma
- Minister: Gugile Nkwinti
- Preceded by: Lech Tsenoli
- Succeeded by: Candith Mashego-Dlamini; Mcebisi Skwatsha

Personal details
- Born: 3 October 1951 (age 74) Cape Province, Union of South Africa
- Party: African National Congress
- Spouse: Steve Tshwete (died 2002)
- Relations: Monde Zondeki (nephew)
- Children: 3, including Mayihlome and Lindela

Pamela Tshwete (born 3 October 1951) is a South African politician from the Eastern Cape. She is currently serving as Deputy Minister of Human Settlements since August 2021. She has been a member of the National Assembly since 2002 and a deputy minister since 2013.

During her first decade in the National Assembly, Tshwete served the African National Congress (ANC) as a whip, first as a committee whip and then as disciplinary whip from 2009 to 2013. President Jacob Zuma appointed her as a deputy minister in July 2013; she was Deputy Minister of Rural Development and Land Reform from 2013 to 2014 and Deputy Minister of Water and Sanitation from 2014 to 2019. After the 2019 general election, President Cyril Ramaphosa appointed Tshwete as Deputy Minister of Human Settlements, Water and Sanitation, a newly created ministry; she was responsible for human settlements and retained that portfolio when the ministry was split again in August 2021.

The widow of activist Steve Tshwete, she joined the ANC in exile during apartheid and was later active in the ANC Women's League. She has been a member of the ANC National Executive Committee since December 2012.

== Early life and activism ==
Born on 3 October 1951, Tshwete matriculated at Zwelitsha High School in King Williams Town in the former Cape Province. Come of age during apartheid, she joined the African National Congress (ANC) in exile. While exiled, she trained as a nurse in Lusaka, Zambia.

Upon her return from exile, Tshwete became a community activist, and she was active in the ANC's newly legalised structures in Mdantsane and Peelton. She was elected to the National Executive Committee of the ANC Women's League for the first time in 1993, and she went on to serve in the Provincial Executive Committee of the mainstream ANC in the Eastern Cape.

== National Assembly backbenches: 2002–2013 ==
Tshwete was sworn in to the National Assembly in 2002, filling a casual vacancy in the ANC's caucus. She was elected to a full term in her seat in the next general election, initially representing the Eastern Cape constituency, though she was later listed on the ANC's national party list. Over the next decade, she served as an ANC whip in a series of different portfolio committees, and from 2009 to 2013, she was the overall disciplinary whip in the ANC caucus, serving under Chief Whip Mathole Motshekga.

During this period, Tshwete rose through the ranks of the ANC. Ahead of the ANC's 52nd National Conference in December 2007, Tshwete was nominated to stand for election to the ANC National Executive Committee; her candidacy was backed by supporters of President Thabo Mbeki, who was ousted from the ANC presidency at the same conference. Though Tshwete was not elected in 2007, she gained election to the committee at the next elective conference, held in Mangaung in December 2012.

== National executive: 2013–present ==
=== Rural Development and Land Reform: 2013–2014 ===
On 9 July 2013, President Jacob Zuma announced a cabinet reshuffle in which Tshwete was appointed to succeed Lech Tsenoli as Deputy Minister of Rural Development and Land Reform. She served under Minister Gugile Nkwinti.

=== Water and Sanitation: 2014–2019 ===
In the 2014 general election, Tshwete was re-elected to her parliamentary seat, ranked 48th on the ANC's national party list. When Zuma named his cabinet after the election, she was appointed as Deputy Minister of Water and Sanitation under Minister Nomvula Mokonyane. She remained in the portfolio throughout Zuma's second term in the presidency, and she was re-elected to the ANC National Executive Committee at the party's 54th National Conference in December 2017. The Mail & Guardian reported that, though previously viewed as a political supporter of Zuma, Tshwete ultimately supported the National Executive Committee's bid to remove Zuma as South African President in February 2018.

=== Human Settlements, Water and Sanitation: 2019–2021 ===
Tshwete was elected to another term in the National Assembly in the 2019 general election, now ranked 70th on the ANC's party list. In Ramaphosa's new cabinet, her former portfolio was merged with the Ministry of Human Settlements to create the Ministry of Human Settlements, Water and Sanitation under Minister Lindiwe Sisulu. Tshwete was one of two deputy ministers appointed to the new portfolio; she was given responsibility for human settlements, while David Mahlobo was responsible for water and sanitation.

=== Human Settlements: 2021–present ===
On 5 August 2021, Ramaphosa announced a reshuffle that involved reversing the 2019 ministerial merger. Tshwete was appointed as Deputy Minister of Human Settlements under the newly appointed minister, Mmamoloko Kubayi. While in this office, at the ANC's 55th National Conference in December 2022, Tshwete was elected to a third consecutive term in the ANC National Executive Committee; she was ranked 71st among the 80 candidates elected.

== Personal life ==
Tshwete lives in King Williams Town. She has various business interests.

She was married to anti-apartheid activist and politician Steve Tshwete, who died in April 2002; they had three children. One of their sons, Mayihlome Tshwete, is the husband of media personality Zizo Beda and a former spokesman to Minister Malusi Gigaba. Another, Lindela Tshwete, is a politician in the opposition Democratic Alliance. International cricketer Monde Zondeki is her nephew.
