= Dirk du Toit =

Dirk Cornelis du Toit (19 September 1943 — 1 June 2009) was the Deputy Minister of Agriculture and Land Affairs of the Republic of South Africa from 1999 to 2009.

Du Toit became a Supreme Court Advocate in 1970 and Professor of Law at the University of the Free State from 1975 to 1994. He joined the Progressive Federal Party, the anti-apartheid parliamentary opposition, and secretly joined the banned African National Congress. He was also legal adviser to the National Education, Health and Allied Workers' Union (Nehawu).

Following the end of apartheid, Du Toit became a Member of Parliament for the African National Congress in 1994. He helped to draft the Constitution of South Africa in 1996.

His interest in human rights and land affairs led him to become Deputy Minister of Agriculture under Lulu Xingwana in the governments of Thabo Mbeki and Kgalema Motlanthe from 1999 until his retirement following the 2009 election. During his tenure, he supported land reform and worked to end the exploitation and unfair eviction of farm workers.
