= Herman van Schalkwyk =

South African agricultural economist

- Born: November 11, 1966 (age 59)
- Education: University of Pretoria
- Occupations: Rector: Potchefstroom Campus, North-West University

Herman van Schalkwyk is a South African agricultural economist and former Rector of the Potchefstroom Campus of the North-West University.

== Biography ==
Van Schalkwyk started lecturing at the University of Pretoria in 1993 after working at Standard Bank for two years as agricultural economist. He accepted an associate professorship at the University of the Free State in 1996 and two years later was appointed as a full professor and head of the Department of Agricultural Economics. From 2003 to 2010 he served as the dean of the Faculty of Natural and Agriculture Sciences before being appointed as Rector of the Potchefstroom Campus of the North-West University.

He has delivered more than 90 papers at local conferences and 47 internationally. Prof Van Schalkwyk is the editor and co-author of Unlocking markets to smallholders: The case of South Africa, which was published by the Wageningen University and Research Centre in the Netherlands.

== Education ==
In 1990 Van Schalkwyk obtained his B.Com. degree at the University of Pretoria (UP), after which he obtained his Honours degree and M.Com. (cum laude). In 1995 he was awarded a Ph.D. in Agricultural Economics at UP.

== Memberships and honours ==
Van Schalkwyk was appointed a member of the National Agriculture Marketing Council by the Minister of Agriculture in 2007, and in 2008 as deputy chairperson of the Board of the Land Bank. He also acted as chairperson of the Board of the Land Bank, for a period of 18 months.

In 2011 he was named National Agriculturalist of the Year of South Africa by Agricultural Writers SA.
