= South African Chamber of Baking =

- Abbreviation: SACB
- Formation: 1938; 88 years ago
- Type: Trade association
- Headquarters: Pretoria, South Africa
- Region served: South Africa
- Members: Plant bakeries, independent retail bakers, and suppliers
- Executive Director: Craig Binnion
- Website: www.sacb.co.za

The South African Chamber of Baking (SACB) is a national business association representing the interests of the commercial baking sector in South Africa. Founded in 1938 and headquartered in Pretoria, the organisation serves as the primary representative body for industrial plant bakeries, independent retail bakers, and various raw material and equipment suppliers within the baking value chain.

== History ==
The SACB was established in 1938 during a period of increasing industrialisation in South Africa's food production sector. Since its inception, the Chamber has monitored the wheat-to-bread value chain, acting as a liaison between the private sector and the government. Historically, it played a key role during the deregulation of the South African wheat market in the 1990s, transitioning from a state-controlled board system to a market-oriented industry.

== Activities and Advocacy ==
The Chamber functions as a consultative body that engages with the Department of Agriculture, Land Reform and Rural Development (DALRRD) and the Department of Health on legislative matters affecting the food industry.

Key areas of advocacy include:

- Food Safety and Nutrition: The SACB was a primary stakeholder in the implementation of South Africa's mandatory sodium reduction targets for bread, providing technical feedback on the 2018 and 2023 salt-level benchmarks.
- Regulatory Lobbying: In 2025, the Chamber, in collaboration with other agricultural stakeholders, successfully advocated for the revocation of external grain inspection services (Leaf Services), arguing that the proposed external inspection fees would lead to unnecessary cost increases for consumers.
- Economic Monitoring: The organisation tracks fluctuating costs in the wheat and energy sectors. It has frequently represented the industry's concerns regarding the impact of load shedding (rolling blackouts) on the biological processes of commercial baking and the resulting economic losses.

== Education and Training ==
The SACB oversees vocational training initiatives to address skills shortages in the baking trade. This includes the management of the Certificate in the Basics of Breadmaking and coordination with the Food and Beverages Manufacturing Industry Education and Training Authority (FoodBev SETA) to facilitate apprenticeships and industry-standard training programmes.

== Membership ==
The membership of the Chamber is divided into three tiers:

1. Plant Bakers: Large-scale commercial bakeries that provide the majority of the nation's bread supply.
2. General Members: Smaller independent, retail, and craft bakeries.
3. Associate Members: Allied industries, including manufacturers of yeast, flour, fats, and baking equipment.
