= Mcebisi Skwatsha =

South African politician

The Honourable Mcebisi Skwatsha MP

Deputy Minister of Agriculture, Land Reform and Rural Development
- In office 29 May 2019 – 19 June 2024 Serving with Rosemary Capa and Sdumo Dlamini
- President: Cyril Ramaphosa
- Minister: Thoko Didiza
- Preceded by: Portfolio established

Member of the National Assembly
- In office 21 May 2014 – 28 May 2024

Deputy Minister of Rural Development and Land Reform
- In office 26 May 2014 – 7 May 2019 Serving with Candith Mashego-Dlamini
- President: Cyril Ramaphosa; Jacob Zuma
- Minister: Maite Nkoana-Mashabane; Gugile Nkwinti
- Preceded by: Pam Tshwete
- Succeeded by: Portfolio abolished
Provincial offices 2004–2014
Member of the Western Cape Provincial Parliament
In office 26 April 2004 – 6 May 2014
Western Cape Provincial Minister of Transport and Public Works
In office April 2004 – July 2005
Premier	Ebrahim Rasool
Succeeded by	Marius Fransman
Party offices 1998–2009
Provincial Chairperson of the African National Congress in the Western Cape
In office September 2008 – July 2009
Deputy	Lynne Brown
Preceded by	James Ngculu
Succeeded by	Marius Fransman
Provincial Secretary of the African National Congress in the Western Cape
In office April 1998 – September 2008
Deputy	Marius Fransman; Max Ozinsky
Chairperson	Ebrahim Rasool; James Ngculu
Preceded by	James Ngculu
Succeeded by	Sipho Kroma

Personal details
- Born: July 31, 1964 (age 62)
- Party: African National Congress
- Education: University of the Western Cape

Mcebisi Skwatsha (born 31 July 1964) is a politician from the Western Cape. He is currently serving as the Deputy Minister of Agriculture, Land Reform and Rural Development since May 2019. Before that portfolio was established, he was Deputy Minister of Rural Development and Land Reform from 2014 to 2019.

Skwatsha is a teacher by training and a former student activist. He rose to prominence as the Provincial Secretary of the Western Cape branch of the African National Congress (ANC), an office he held between 1998 and 2008. He went on to become ANC Provincial Chairperson from September 2008 until July 2009, when his leadership corps was disbanded by the national ANC. During this period, Skwatsha represented the ANC in the Western Cape Provincial Parliament from 2004 to 2014, and he was Provincial Minister of Transport and Public Works from 2004 to 2005.

He joined the National Assembly in the 2014 general election and in the aftermath was appointed as a deputy minister by President Jacob Zuma. He was also a member of the ANC National Executive Committee from 2012 to 2017.

== Early life and career ==
Born on 31 July 1964, Skwatsha matriculated at Fezeka Senior Secondary School in Gugulethu, a township in Cape Town. He became politically active at an early age, joining underground structures of the African National Congress (ANC) and assuming an activist role in the Congress of South African Students, Cape Youth Congress, and South African Youth Congress. He was also a member of the United Democratic Front.

Skwatsha enrolled in undergraduate study at the University of Fort Hare, but was unable to complete his degree in the political turmoil of the late apartheid period; later, in 1990, he completed a Bachelor of Arts at the University of the Western Cape. He also has a teaching diploma from the same university. He went on to become a primary school teacher in New Crossroads, Cape Town. At the same time, he became a member of the ANC Youth League, which had been unbanned by the apartheid government in 1990; he was later the league's provincial chairperson and a member of its national executive committee.

== Western Cape ANC ==
=== Provincial Secretary: 1998–2008 ===
In 1998, Skwatsha was elected as Provincial Secretary of the ANC's Western Cape branch, serving under Provincial Chairperson Ebrahim Rasool; Marius Fransman was his deputy. Early in his tenure, in July 1999, he and five other ANC members were arrested in connection with the 1997 murder of a political activist, Milton Mbewana. The charges were dropped a day later.

Concurrently with his party office, Skwatsha held business interests, including in a private security company. By 2008, however, he said that his only commercial interests were ten mobile toilets that he owned with a friend. In addition, he joined the Western Cape Provincial Parliament in the April 2004 general election. He was ranked fourth on the ANC's provincial party list, and he was considered a possible contender for election as Premier of the Western Cape; however, the ANC selected Ebrahim Rasool for that office, and it was Skwatsha who formally nominated Rasool for the position during the parliament's first sitting.

In the aftermath of the election, on 30 April 2004, he was named to the Western Cape Provincial Cabinet as Provincial Minister of Transport and Public Works. However, he served in that office for only a little over a year. In June 2005, at a provincial elective conference at Cape Town's Good Hope Centre, Skwatsha was re-elected as Provincial Secretary, while Rasool was ousted as Provincial Chairperson by James Ngculu, who ran with the support of Skwatsha's so-called "Africanist" faction. In the aftermath, the ANC said that Skwatsha had agreed to step down from the Western Cape Provincial Cabinet in order to focus on his full-time party office. After some wrangling, Marius Fransman was appointed to replace him on 26 July 2005. Skwatsha retained his seat in the Western Cape Provincial Parliament, and his behaviour in the Transport and Public Works portfolio remained controversial after his departure: he was later investigated – and cleared – on a misconduct charge by the provincial parliament's public accounts committee.

=== Provincial Chairperson: 2008–2009 ===
Ahead of the ANC's next provincial conference, Skwatsha launched a campaign to succeed Ngculu as Provincial Chairperson. Skwatsha and Ngculu were increasingly at odds as the broader ANC became divided in a national succession contest between Jacob Zuma and President Thabo Mbeki; Skwatsha was a prominent supporter of Zuma's presidential bid. The provincial succession contest was also hotly contested. During this period, in June 2008, Skwatsha was stabbed in the neck at a heated ANC meeting in Worcester. An ANC Youth League member, Ndikho Tyawana, was convicted of attempted murder.

On 25 September 2008 in Cape Town, Skwatsha was elected unopposed as ANC Provincial Chairperson. Lynne Brown, the recently appointed Premier of the Western Cape, was elected as his deputy. Although Skwatsha stood unopposed, the elections were boycotted by some members, especially supporters of Lerumo Kalako, a supporter of Ngculu and a leadership contender, who claimed that there had been electoral irregularities.

==== Removal from office ====
His tenure in the party chairmanship was brief. The ANC lost control of the Western Cape government in the April 2009 general election, and the ANC's National Executive Committee appointed an internal inquiry to investigate the party's poor performance in the province. Chris Nissen, who was appointed by Luthuli House to lead the provincial election task team, said openly after the election that he believed the ANC's provincial leadership corps should be dissolved, because "Skwatsha, Max Ozinsky and Garth Strachan were responsible for destroying the ANC in the province in the run-up to the election".

In July 2009, the ANC's national leadership implemented Nissen's recommendation, dissolving the Western Cape Provincial Executive Committee and therefore removing Skwatsha from his office prematurely. Skwatsha conceded that the provincial party was affected by factionalism, but pointed out that he had not had sufficient time to address it during his short tenure in office.

==== Aftermath ====
According to the Mail & Guardian, Skwatsha began lobbying for his re-election almost immediately after being removed from the ANC office. That campaign lasted almost two years: the provincial party did not hold fresh leadership elections until it met in Cape Town on 12 February 2011. Yet when the conference opened, Skwatsha unexpectedly withdrew from the race, allowing Marius Fransman to gain election unopposed. Skwatsha's supporters claimed that Skwatsha had not participated because the proceedings were "fraudulent", in particular because the ANC Youth League had not been allowed to vote in the elections.

Although removed from top party office, Skwatsha remained an ordinary Member of the Provincial Parliament during this period. Indeed, in late 2009, he was at the centre of a row that broke out in the provincial parliament after Premier Helen Zille claimed that Skwatsha and Max Ozinsky had leaked government information to Zille's Democratic Alliance. Skwatsha strongly denied Zille's claim, calling it tantamount to "treason". In addition, at the ANC's 53rd National Conference in December 2012, Skwatsha was elected to a five-year term as a member of the ANC's National Executive Committee.

== National government ==
=== Rural Development and Land Reform: 2014–2019 ===
In the 2014 general election, Skwatsha was elected to an ANC seat in the National Assembly, the lower house of the South African Parliament. After the election, President Zuma appointed him as Deputy Minister of Rural Development and Land Reform; he was one of two deputy ministers in the portfolio, the other being Candith Mashego-Dlamini. Concurrently, he served the rest of his term as a member of the ANC National Executive Committee, but he was not re-elected to the committee upon the expiry of his term in December 2017.

=== Agriculture, Land Reform and Rural Development: 2019–2023 ===
After the 2019 general election, Zuma's successor, President Cyril Ramaphosa, merged the ministry with the Ministry of Agriculture, creating the Ministry of Agriculture, Land Reform and Rural Development. Skwatsha was retained as one of two deputy ministers in the new portfolio.

== Personal life ==
He is married to Nolusapho Skwatsha.
