= Office of the Valuer-General South Africa =

Schedule 3(A) Public Entity overview
- Formed: 2018
- Jurisdiction: Government of South Africa
- Headquarters: Pretoria; 25.748200°S 28.192980°E
- Schedule 3(A) Public Entity executive: Motlatso Maloka, Acting Valuer-General
- Website: www.ovg.org.za

The Office of the Valuer-General is a Schedule 3(A) public entity of the Ministry of Agriculture, Land Reform and Rural Development established through the Property Valuation Act No. 17 of 2014 (PVA), which came into effect on 01 August 2015. The OVG was listed by the Minister of Finance, as a Schedule 3(A) public entity in terms of the Public Finance Management Act during the 2017/18 financial year.

The purpose of the entity is to support the program of Land Reform through a provision of property valuation services. The Accounting Authority of the entity is the Valuer-General, a position currently held in an acting capacity by Motlatso Maloka. The Valuer-General is supported by an executive management team.

In the 2020 budget the entity received an appropriation of R144,1 million.

== Related agencies ==
- Ministry of Agriculture, Land Reform and Rural Development
- South African Council for the Property Valuers Profession
