= Minister of Women, Youth and Persons with Disabilities =

South Africa Minister of Women, Youth and Persons with Disabilities
- Flag of South Africa

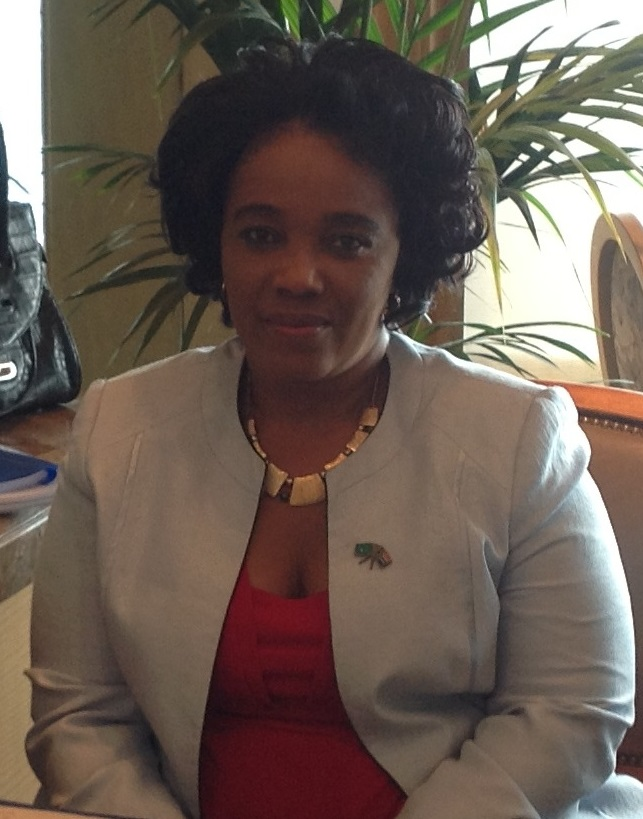
- Incumbent; Sindisiwe Chikunga since 30 June 2024
- Department of Women, Youth and Persons with Disabilities
- Style: The Honourable
- Appointer: President of South Africa
- Inaugural holder: Noluthando Mayende-Sibiya
- Formation: 10 May 2009

The minister of women, youth and persons with disabilities is the minister of the South African government with political responsibility for South Africa's Department of Women, Youth and Persons with Disabilities. Between 2014 and 2024, the ministry was located in the Presidency, making its holders ministers in the presidency.

The current minister is Sindisiwe Chikunga, who was appointed by President Cyril Ramaphosa on 30 June 2024.

== History ==
On 10 May 2009, announcing his first-term cabinet, newly elected President Jacob Zuma announced the establishment of the Ministry of Women, Youth, Children and People with Disabilities. Its formation was the result of a policy resolution by delegates to the 52nd National Conference of the governing party, the African National Congress. The inaugural minister was Noluthando Mayende-Sibiya.

== List of ministers ==
Title	Name	Portrait	Term	Party	President
Minister of Women, Youth, Children and People with Disabilities	Noluthando Mayende-Sibiya		11 May 2009 – 31 October 2010	ANC	Jacob Zuma (I)
Minister of Women, Children and Persons with Disability	Lulu Xingwana		1 November 2010 – 26 May 2014	ANC	Jacob Zuma (I)
Minister in the Presidency for Women	Susan Shabangu		3 June 2014 – 28 February 2018	ANC	Jacob Zuma (II)
Minister in the Presidency for Women	Bathabile Dlamini		27 February 2018 – 29 May 2019	ANC	Cyril Ramaphosa (I)
Minister in the Presidency for Women, Youth and Persons with Disabilities	Maite Nkoana-Mashabane		30 May 2019 – 6 March 2023	ANC	Cyril Ramaphosa (II)
Minister in the Presidency for Women, Youth and Persons with Disabilities	Nkosazana Dlamini-Zuma		6 March 2023 – 19 June 2024	ANC	Cyril Ramaphosa (II)
Minister of Women, Youth and Persons with Disabilities	Sindisiwe Chikunga		30 June 2024 – present	ANC	Cyril Ramaphosa (III)
