= Minister of Agriculture, Land Reform and Rural Development =

Position in the Cabinet of South Africa

- Flag of South Africa
- Department of Agriculture, Land Reform and Rural Development
- Appointer: President of South Africa
- Precursor: Minister of Agriculture, Forestry and Fisheries; Minister of Rural Development and Land Reform
- Formation: 29 May 2019
- Final holder: Thoko Didiza
- Abolished: 30 June 2024
- Succession: Minister of Agriculture; Minister of Land Reform and Rural Development
- Deputy: Deputy Minister of Agriculture, Land Reform and Rural Development
- Salary: R2,401,633
- Website: Department of Agriculture, Land Reform and Rural Development

The minister of agriculture, land reform and rural development was a minister of the Cabinet of South Africa, with political executive responsibility for agriculture, land reform and rural development, as well as for the Agricultural Research Council, the National Agricultural Marketing Council, Onderstepoort Biological Products, the Perishable Products Export Control Board, and Ncera Farms.

The agriculture, land reform and rural development portfolio was created in the 2019 cabinet reorganization by President Cyril Ramaphosa; the minister inherited the responsibility for agriculture from the minister of agriculture, forestry and fisheries. The last minister of agriculture, forestry and fisheries was Senzeni Zokwana with Sfiso Buthelezi as his deputy, before the portfolio was changed in May 2019.

The ministry was split in 2024 into the Ministry of Agriculture and the Ministry of Land Reform and Rural Development in the third cabinet of Cyril Ramaphosa.
