= Minister of Public Enterprises =

South African ministerial position (1994–2024)

South Africa Minister of Public Enterprises
- List: 10 other official names: Minister van Openbare Ondernemings (Afrikaans); uNgqongqotjhe wezamaBhizinisi womBuso (Southern Ndebele); UMphathiswa lezaMashishini kaRhulumente (Xhosa); uNgqongqothe Wezamabhizinisi Kahulumeni (Zulu); Indvuna Leteluhwebo Lwahulumende (Swazi); Tona ya Dikgwebo tša Setšhaba (Northern Sotho); Letona la Dikgwebo tsa Setjhaba (Sotho); Tona la Ditiro tsa Setšhaba (Tswana); Holobye ya Mabindzu ya Mfumo (Tsonga); Minisiṱa wa Mabindu a Tshitshavha (Venda)
- Flag of South Africa
- Department of Public Enterprises
- Style: The Honourable
- Appointer: The president of South Africa
- Inaugural holder: Stella Sigcau
- Formation: 11 May 1994
- Final holder: Pravin Gordhan
- Abolished: 19 June 2024
- Deputy: Gratitude Magwanishe
- Website: Official website

The minister of public enterprises was a minister in the cabinet of the national government of South Africa. Whomever held the position was the political head of the Department of Public Enterprises.

They were appointed by the president of South Africa. This portfolio was established in 1999, and it oversaw the various state-owned enterprises of South Africa.

Pravin Gordhan was the last appointed minister of public enterprises. He was appointed by President Cyril Ramaphosa, shortly after the 2018 South African Presidential Election. The ministry was disestablished following the 2024 general elections and inauguration of the Third Cabinet of Cyril Ramaphosa, being folded into the Department of Planning, Monitoring and Evaluation (DPME) during the process of implementing a new shareholder model.

== List of ministers ==
Minister	Term		President	Party	Ref.
The Hon. Stella Sigcau	1994	1999	Mandela (GNU)	ANC	
The Hon. Jeff Radebe	1999	2004	Mbeki (I)	ANC	
The Hon. Alec Erwin	2004	2008	Mbeki (II)	ANC	
The Hon. Brigitte Mabandla	2008	2009	Motlanthe (I)	ANC	
The Hon. Barbara Hogan	2009	2010	Zuma (I)	ANC	
The Hon. Malusi Gigaba	2010	2014	Zuma (I)	ANC	
The Hon. Lynne Brown	2014	2018	Zuma (II)	ANC	
The Hon. Pravin Gordhan	2018	2024	Ramaphosa (I, II)	ANC	
