= Department of Agriculture, Land Reform and Rural Development =

South African government department

Department overview
- Formed: June 26, 2019
- Preceding agencies: Department of Agriculture, Forestry and Fisheries; Department of Rural Development and Land Reform
- Jurisdiction: Government of South Africa
- Headquarters: Agriculture Place, 20 Steve Biko Street, Arcadia; 25.7372°S 28.2038°E
- Employees: 7,505 (2018/19)
- Annual budget: R16,810.1 million (2020/21)
- Minister responsible: Willie Aucamp, Minister of Agriculture
- Deputy Minister responsible: Rosemary Capa, Deputy Minister
- Department executive: Director-General: Agriculture, Land Reform and Rural Development
- Website: www.dalrrd.gov.za

The Department of Agriculture, Land Reform and Rural Development (DALRRD) is a department of the Government of South Africa created in June 2019 by the merger of the agriculture functions of the former Department of Agriculture, Forestry and Fisheries with the Department of Rural Development and Land Reform. The department has responsibility for agriculture, food safety, food security, land reform, topographic mapping, cadastral survey, the Deeds Offices, and spatial planning.

The political head of the department is the Minister of Agriculture, Land Reform and Rural Development, who is assisted by two deputy ministers. As of August 2020 the minister is Thoko Didiza, the deputy minister for land reform is Mcebisi Skwatsha, and the deputy minister for rural development is Sdumo Dlamini.

In the 2020 budget the department received an appropriation of R16,810.1 million. In the 2019/19 financial year it had 7,505 employees.

== Subordinate agencies ==
- Agricultural Research Council
- Deeds Registries
- Ingonyama Trust Board
- National Agricultural Marketing Council
- Ncera Farms
- Office of the Valuer-General
- Onderstepoort Biological Products
- Perishable Products Export Control Board
- National Rural Youth Service Corps
