= Minister of Agriculture and Land Affairs =

The minister of agriculture and land affairs was, from 1996 to 2009, a minister of the Cabinet of South Africa, with responsibility for the departments of agriculture and land affairs. The portfolio was created in 1996 when the positions of minister of agriculture and minister of land affairs were merged. In the 2009 cabinet reorganization after the election of President Jacob Zuma, the portfolio's responsibilities were divided and transferred to the minister of agriculture, forestry and fisheries and the minister of rural development and land reform.

== Ministers of agriculture and land affairs ==
Derek Hanekom	1996–1999	Government of President Nelson Mandela
Thoko Didiza	1999–2006	Government of President Thabo Mbeki
Lulama Xingwana	2006–2008	Government of President Thabo Mbeki
Lulama Xingwana	2008–2009	Government of President Kgalema Motlanthe

== See also ==
- Department of Agriculture (South Africa)
- Department of Land Affairs (South Africa)
