= Minister of Land Reform and Rural Development =

South Africa Minister of Land Reform and Rural Development
- Flag of South Africa
- Incumbent; Mzwanele Nyhontso since 3 July 2024
- Department of Land Reform and Rural Development
- Style: The Honourable
- Appointer: President of South Africa
- Inaugural holder: Gugile Nkwinti
- Formation: 11 May 2009; 17 years ago
- Deputy: Stan Mathabatha
- Website: www.dalrrd.gov.za

The minister of land reform and rural development is a minister in the Cabinet of South Africa. The office was established as the minister of rural development and land reform in May 2009, though it was subsequently merged with the agriculture portfolio under the minister of agriculture, land reform and rural development from 2019 to 2024.

The same portfolio was previously the provenance of the minister of land affairs. Before President Jacob Zuma appointed the first minister of rural development and Land Reform in May 2009, land affairs were conjoined with agriculture under the minister of agriculture and land affairs between 1996 and 2009.

The minister has political responsibility for the Department of Land Reform and Rural Development. The incumbent minister is Mzwanele Nyhontso, who is the first opposition politician to hold the office; he was appointed on 30 June 2024.

== Post-apartheid history ==
The land affairs portfolio existed in the apartheid-era cabinet, and a minister of land affairs, Derek Hanekom, was appointed in President Nelson Mandela's cabinet in May 1994. However, in a cabinet reshuffle in May 1996, Mandela announced that the portfolio would be subsumed under the Ministry of Agriculture; Hanekom thereby became the minister of agriculture and land affairs.

When President Jacob Zuma announced his first cabinet on 10 May 2009, he reversed Mandela's merger. The agriculture portfolio was conjoined with forestry and fisheries under the minister of agriculture, forestry and fisheries, and the independent land affairs portfolio was re-launched as the Ministry of Rural Development and Land Reform. The name change reflected an overt focus on rural development and land reform in South Africa, which Zuma counted among his policy priorities. Indeed, when Zuma announced his second-term cabinet on 24 May 2014, he announced that the ministry would henceforth have two deputy ministers instead of one, in recognition of the importance of rural areas and particularly the former homelands.

Appointing his own second cabinet on 29 May 2019, President Cyril Ramaphosa announced that the land affairs portfolio would be merged with the agriculture portfolio, as it had been before Zuma's tenure. The Ministry of Agriculture, Land Reform and Rural Development was inaugurated under Minister Gugile Nkwinti, also with two deputy ministers. However, when he announced his third cabinet on 30 June 2024, Ramaphosa reversed the merger, appointing an independent minister of land reform and rural development to serve alongside a minister of agriculture.

== List of ministers ==
List of ministers responsible for land affairs, 1994–present
Portfolio	Name	Term		Party
Land affairs	Derek Hanekom	1994	1996	ANC
Agriculture and land affairs	Derek Hanekom	1996	1999	ANC
Agriculture and land affairs	Thoko Didiza	1999	2006	ANC
Agriculture and land affairs	Lulu Xingwana	2006	2009	ANC
Rural development and land reform	Gugile Nkwinti	2009	2018	ANC
Rural development and land reform	Maite Nkoana-Mashabane	2018	2019	ANC
Agriculture, land reform and rural development	Thoko Didiza	2019	2024	ANC
Land reform and rural development	Mzwanele Nyhontso	2024	Incumbent	PAC
