= Department of Rural Development and Land Reform =

Defunct South African government department

The Department of Rural Development and Land Reform was, from 2009 to 2019, one of the departments of the South African government. It was responsible for topographic mapping, cadastral surveying, deeds registration, and land reform. The department fell under the responsibility of the Minister of Rural Development and Land Reform, which for most of the department's existence was Gugile Nkwinti (2010 to 2018). The department's name was commonly abbreviated DRDLR.

Significant components of the department included the Deeds Registries, the office of the Chief Surveyor-General, the Chief Directorate: National Geo-spatial Information (South Africa's national mapping agency), and the Land Claims Commission.

In June 2019, the DRDLR merged with the Department of Agriculture, Forestry and Fisheries (DAFF) to become the Department of Agriculture, Land Reform and Rural Development (DALRRD).

== See also ==
- Minister of Rural Development and Land Reform (South Africa)
- Examiners of Rural Development and Land Reform (South Africa)
