= Transvaal Agricultural Union =

Farmers' union in South Africa

Logo since 2019

The Transvaal Agricultural Union of South Africa (TAU SA) is a commercial farmers union in South Africa. Its main goal is to protect private property rights and the safety of South African farmers.

== Principles ==
- End Black Economic Empowerment as an illegal practise of racial discrimination.
- Ensure economic growth within the agricultural sector.
- Ensure the safety of South African Farmers.
- Ongoing dialogue with the government over issues within the agricultural sector.
- Protect South African farmers' right to private property to exercise their calling as farmers.
- Ensure the food security of South Africa.
- Protection of the Boer/Afrikaner’s right to freedom of association.

== Structure ==
The TAU has been in existence since 1897. Although it was an organisation exclusively for farmers in the Transvaal at first, many farmers from other South African Provinces have joined the organization in recent years, because of dissatisfaction with other, liberal agricultural organizations throughout the country. It has a large number of members in the Free State province. The current president is Paul Van der Walt and the Vice-President is Wille Lewies. It also has seven district chairmen throughout the country. It holds its national congress annually.

== See also ==
- Afrikaans Protestant Church
- BCVO
