= Ellen Molekane =

South African politician

Deputy Minister of State Security
- In office 26 May 2014 – 7 May 2019
- President: Cyril Ramaphosa; Jacob Zuma
- Minister: Dipuo Letsatsi-Duba; Bongani Bongo; David Mahlobo
- Succeeded by: Zizi Kodwa

Member of the National Assembly
- In office 30 July 2018 – 7 May 2019

Personal details
- Born: Ellen Nnana Ntsitse Molekane; 2 August 1953 (age 73) Soweto, South Africa
- Party: African National Congress
- Relations: Rapu Molekane (brother)
- Education: Morris Isaacson High School

Ellen Nnana Ntsitse Molekane (born 2 August 1953) was South Africa's Deputy Minister of State Security between May 2014 and May 2019. A member of the African National Congress (ANC), she was a civil servant in the Department of Defence until President Jacob Zuma appointed her to the national executive. She was also briefly a member of the National Assembly from July 2018 to May 2019.

== Early life and education ==
Molekane was born on 2 August 1953 in Soweto. The second of seven siblings, she matriculated at the Morris Isaacson High School, where she joined the South African Students' Movement. Her early political involvements partly inspired the anti-apartheid activism of her younger brother, Rapu Molekane.

== Military career ==
After matriculating, Molekane worked briefly at Baragwanath Hospital in Johannesburg as a clerk and student nurse; she intended to work as a nurse or accountant. However, in 1977, she left South Africa to join the anti-apartheid African National Congress (ANC) in exile. Over the next 15 years, she was a full-time ANC operative, spending time in Swaziland, Mozambique, Tanzania, and Zambia; in Zambia in the 1980s, she was director of the ANC's religious desk and the treasurer of its Politico-Military Council. As a member of Umkhonto we Sizwe, she received military training in the German Democratic Republic, specialising in military engineering.

In 1991, amid the negotiations to end apartheid, Molekane returned to South Africa to work at ANC headquarters at Shell House, Johannesburg. After the end of apartheid in 1994, she was among the former MK operatives who were integrated into the new South African National Defence Force. Entering at the rank of lieutenant colonel, she worked in the public service for the next 20 years, predominantly at the Department of Defence, where she rose through the ranks to become a Deputy Director-General. Between 2002 and 2012, she was stationed in the ministerial office of Lindiwe Sisulu, following Sisulu from the Ministry of Intelligence to the Ministry of Housing and finally to the Ministry of Defence.

During the same period, she remained active in the ANC. At the ANC's 52nd National Conference in December 2007, she stood unsuccessfully for election to the party's National Executive Committee. Shortly thereafter she joined the committee by co-option.

== Deputy Minister of State Security: 2014–2019 ==
On 25 May 2014, shortly after that month's general election, President Jacob Zuma announced Molekane's appointment as Deputy Minister of State Security. She remained in that office throughout the term of the Fifth Parliament. The Daily Maverick said in 2018 that she was "almost imperceptible" to the public.

Initially appointed from outside Parliament, Molekane was sworn in to the National Assembly on 30 July 2018, filling the casual vacancy that was created by Fikile Mbalula's resignation. She did not stand for re-election in the 2019 general election.

== Publications ==
Molekane, Ellen (1996). "The Role of Women in the South African National Defence Force". African Security Review. 5 (5): 23–26. doi:10.1080/10246029.1996.9627822. ISSN 1024-6029.
