= Minister of Water and Sanitation (South Africa) =

South Africa Minister of Water and Sanitation
- Flag of South Africa

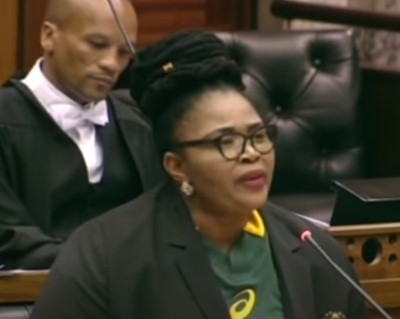
- Incumbent; Pemmy Majodina since 30 June 2024
- Department of Water and Sanitation
- Style: The Honourable
- Appointer: President of South Africa
- Inaugural holder: Ernest George Jansen
- Formation: 1928
- Deputy: Jack Bloom (DA)
- Website: Department of Water and Sanitation

The minister of water and sanitation is a minister in the Cabinet of South Africa. The minister has political responsibility for the Department of Water and Sanitation. The office in its current form was re-established in August 2021; it formerly existed between May 2014 and May 2019.

During other periods, the water affairs portfolio was conjoined with other portfolios, including under the minister of water affairs and forestry from 1994 to 2009, under the minister of water and environmental affairs from 2009 to 2014, and, most recently, under the minister of human settlements, water and sanitation from 2019 to 2021.

== Post-apartheid history ==
Between 1994 and 2009, the water affairs portfolio was conjoined with the forestry portfolio under the minister of water affairs and forestry. When he announced his first cabinet on 10 May 2009, President Jacob Zuma severed those portfolios and conjoined water affairs with the environment portfolio instead, creating the minister of water and environmental affairs (while forestry moved to the minister of agriculture, forestry and fisheries).

With the appointment of Zuma's second cabinet on 25 May 2014, the Water and Environmental Affairs portfolio was bifurcated, and a dedicated Ministry of Water and Sanitation was established. However, on 29 May 2019, Zuma's successor, President Cyril Ramaphosa, conjoined the Department of Water and Sanitation with the Department of Human Settlements, creating the minister of human settlements, water and sanitation in his second cabinet. This merger was short-lived: during a cabinet reshuffle on 5 August 2021, Ramaphosa announced that the Ministry of Water and Sanitation would be re-established as an independent ministry under Senzo Mchunu.

== List of ministers ==
List of ministers responsible for water affairs, 1994–present
Portfolio	Name	Term		Party
Water Affairs and Forestry	Kader Asmal	1994	1999	ANC
Water Affairs and Forestry	Ronnie Kasrils	1999	2004	ANC
Water Affairs and Forestry	Buyelwa Sonjica	2004	2006	ANC
Water Affairs and Forestry	Lindiwe Hendricks	2006	2009	ANC
Water and Environmental Affairs	Buyelwa Sonjica	2009	2010	ANC
Water and Environmental Affairs	Edna Molewa	2010	2014	ANC
Water and Sanitation	Nomvula Mokonyane	2014	2018	ANC
Water and Sanitation	Gugile Nkwinti	2018	2019	ANC
Human Settlements, Water and Sanitation	Lindiwe Sisulu	2019	2021	ANC
Water and Sanitation	Senzo Mchunu	2021	2024	ANC
Water and Sanitation	Pemmy Majodina	2024	Incumbent	ANC

== See also ==
- Water supply and sanitation in South Africa
