= Department of Agriculture, Forestry and Fisheries (South Africa) =

- List: 10 other official names: Departement van Landbou (Afrikaans); umNyango wezokuLima (Southern Ndebele); iSebe lezoLimo (Xhosa); uMnyango Wezolimo (Zulu); Litiko Letekulima (Swazi); Kgoro ya Temo (Northern Sotho); Lefapha la Temo (Sotho); Lefapha la Temothuo (Tswana); Ndzawulo ya Vurimi (Tsonga); Muhasho wa Vhulimi (Venda)

Department overview
- Formed: 7 July 2009
- Preceding agencies: Department of Agriculture; Department of Water Affairs and Forestry; Department of Environmental Affairs and Tourism
- Superseding Department: Department of Agriculture, Land Reform and Rural Development
- Jurisdiction: Government of South Africa
- Headquarters: Agriculture Place, 20 Beatrix Street, Arcadia 0002, Pretoria, Gauteng; 25°44′13″S 28°12′14″E
- Employees: 5,924 (2009)
- Annual budget: R663,9 million (Administration); R4,554 billion (Agriculture); R525,5 million (Forestry); R434 million (Fisheries)
- Minister responsible: Senzeni Zokwana, Minister of Agriculture, Forestry and Fisheries
- Deputy Minister responsible: Bheki Cele, Deputy Minister of Agriculture, Forestry and Fisheries
- Department executive: Njabulo Nduli, Director General
- Child agencies: Agricultural Research Council; National Agricultural Marketing Council; Onderstepoort Biological Products; Perishable Products Export Control Board; Ncera Farms
- Website: Department Website

The Department of Agriculture, Forestry and Fisheries was one of the departments of the South African government. It was responsible for overseeing and supporting South Africa's agricultural sector, as well as ensuring access to sufficient, safe and nutritious food by the country's population. The department fell under the responsibility of the Minister of Agriculture, Forestry and Fisheries. In 2010 the minister was Senzeni Zokwana. In the 2014 national budget, the department received an appropriation of R6,178 billion rand, and had 5,924 employees as of 2010.

In June 2019 government departments were reconfigured. The agriculture function of DAFF became part of the new Department of Agriculture, Land Reform and Rural Development, while the forestry and fisheries functions became part of the Department of Environment, Forestry and Fisheries.
