= Minister of Agriculture, Forestry and Fisheries (South Africa) =

- Flag of South Africa
- Department of Agriculture, Forestry and Fisheries
- Appointer: President of South Africa
- Inaugural holder: Tina Joemat-Peterson
- Formation: 10 May 2009
- Final holder: Senzeni Zokwana
- Abolished: 27 May 2019
- Deputy: Deputy Minister of Agriculture, Forestry and Fisheries
- Salary: R2,211,937
- Website: Department of Agriculture, Forestry and Fisheries

The minister of agriculture, forestry and fisheries was a minister of the Cabinet of South Africa from 2009 to 2019, with political executive responsibility for the Department of Agriculture, Forestry and Fisheries, and for the Agricultural Research Council, the National Agricultural Marketing Council, Onderstepoort Biological Products, the Perishable Products Export Control Board, and Ncera Farms.

The agriculture, forestry and fisheries portfolio was created in the 2009 cabinet reorganization after the election of President Jacob Zuma; the minister inherited the responsibility for agriculture from the minister of agriculture and land affairs, the responsibility for fisheries from the minister of environmental affairs and tourism, and the responsibility for forestry from the minister of water affairs and forestry. In May 2019, the cabinet was reorganised and the portfolio's responsibilities were divided between the ministers of agriculture, land reform and rural development and environment, forestry and fisheries.

== List of ministers ==
	Minister				Deputy Minister			
Cabinet	Name	Term		Party	Name	Term		Party
Zuma I	Tina Joemat-Peterson	2009	2014	ANC	Pieter Mulder	2009	2014	FF+
Zuma II	Senzeni Zokwana	2014	2018	ANC	Bheki Cele	2014	2018	ANC
Ramaphosa I	Senzeni Zokwana	2018	2019	ANC	Sfiso Buthelezi	2018	2019	ANC
