= Agri SA =

Agricultural organisation in South Africa

- Founded: 1904
- Headquarters: Pretoria, Gauteng
- Location: South Africa
- President: Jaco Minnaar
- Website: https://www.agrisa.co.za/

Agri SA (Agri South Africa) is the biggest agricultural organisations in South Africa established in 1904 and consists of provincial affiliates, commodity organisations and corporate members.
