= Sfiso Buthelezi =

South African politician

His Excellency Sfiso Buthelezi

Deputy Minister of Finance
- In office April 2017 – 27 February 2018

Personal details
- Born: Sfiso Norbert Buthelezi; 1961 (age 64–65) Mahlabathini, KwaZulu-Natal
- Party: African National Congress
- Education: University of Cape Town
- Profession: Economist

Sfiso Norbert Buthelezi (born 1961) is a South African politician and member of the National Assembly of South Africa. He is a member of the country's ruling party, the African National Congress.

== Early life ==
Buthelezi was born in Mahlabathini, KwaZulu-Natal, in 1961.

In 1981, at the age of 20, Buthelezi joined uMkhonto we Sizwe, the former paramilitary wing of the African National Congress. He was arrested in 1983 and imprisoned at Robben Island prison for eight years until his release in 1991.

== Career ==
From 1994 to 1999, Buthelezi served as an economic advisor to Jacob Zuma, who at that time was the member of the Executive Council for economic development in KwaZulu-Natal. He was also an adviser to Mathews Phosa during his premiership in Mpumalanga.

In 1999, he became the Chief Operating Officer of Makana Investment Corporation. That same year, then president Thabo Mbeki appointed him as the founding chairperson of the National Gambling Board.

In 2005, Minister of Transport Jeff Radebe appointed Buthelezi to the board of the South African Rail Commuter Corporation (SARCC), later renamed the Passenger Rail Agency of South Africa (PRASA), with Buthelezi serving as the first chairperson of PRASA from 2009 to 2014.

Buthelezi was appointed as the Deputy Minister of Finance in April 2017, following a cabinet reshuffle by President Jacob Zuma, removing Pravin Gordhan as Minister of Finance and Mcebisi Jonas as Deputy Minister of Finance.

After Zuma resigned as President on 14 February 2018, his successor Cyril Ramaphosa reshuffled his cabinet, moving Buthelezi to the position of Deputy Minister of Agriculture, Forestry and Fisheries.

== See also ==
- African Commission on Human and Peoples' Rights
- Constitution of South Africa
- History of the African National Congress
- Politics in South Africa
- Provincial governments of South Africa
