= Maite Nkoana-Mashabane =

South African politician

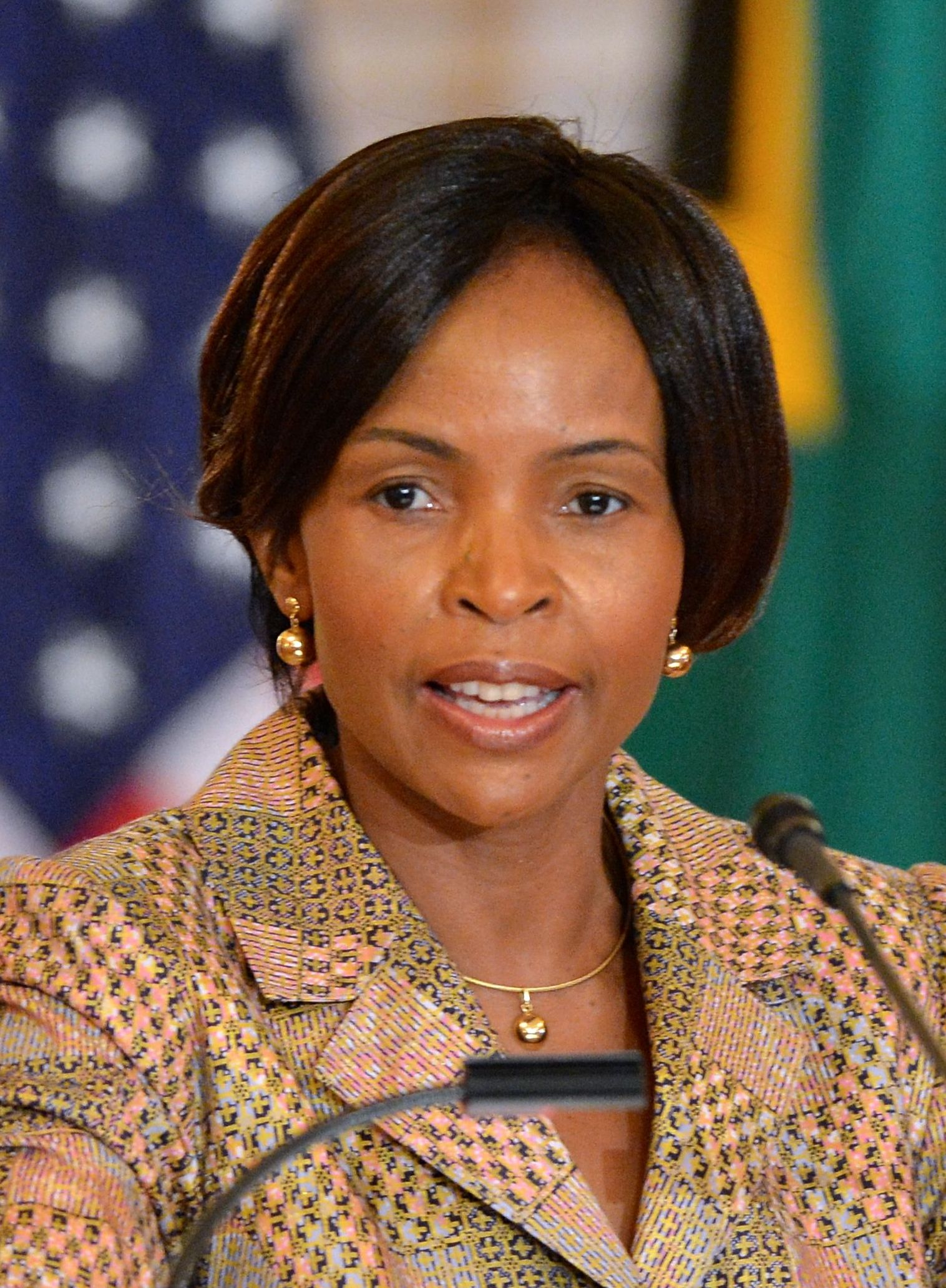
- Maite Nkoana-Mashabane on 16 September 2015

Minister of Women, Youth and Persons with Disabilities in the Presidency
- In office 30 May 2019 – 6 March 2023
- President: Cyril Ramaphosa
- Preceded by: Bathabile Dlamini
- Succeeded by: Nkosazana Dlamini-Zuma

Minister of Rural Development and Land Reform
- In office 26 February 2018 – 29 May 2019
- President: Cyril Ramaphosa
- Preceded by: Gugile Nkwinti
- Succeeded by: Post dissolved

Minister of International Relations and Cooperation
- In office 10 May 2009 – 26 February 2018
- President: Jacob Zuma; Cyril Ramaphosa
- Deputy: Nomaindia Mfeketo; Luwellyn Landers
- Preceded by: Nkosazana Dlamini-Zuma (Foreign Affairs)
- Succeeded by: Lindiwe Sisulu

Member of the Executive Council for Local Government and Housing of Limpopo
- In office 25 September 2004 – 9 May 2008
- Premier: Sello Moloto
- Preceded by: Thabo Nzima
- Succeeded by: Siyabonga Quintin

Personal details
- Born: Maite Emily Nkoana; 30 September 1963 (age 62) Magoebaskloof, South Africa
- Party: African National Congress
- Spouse: Norman Mashabane (Deceased 2007)

Maite Emily Nkoana-Mashabane (born 30 September 1963), formerly known as Maite Mohale, is a South African politician who served as the Minister of Women, Youth and Persons with Disabilities. She was Minister of Rural Development and Land Reform from 2018 to 2019, and previously served as Minister of International Relations and Cooperation from 2009 to 2018. Nkoana-Mashabane is also a former member of the National Executive Committee of the African National Congress (ANC).

== Biography ==
Nkoana-Mashabane was born in Magoebaskloof and raised in Ga-Makanye, Limpopo. During the 1980s, she was an active member of the United Democratic Front and served in various structures of the Mass Democratic Movement and the African National Congress' (ANC) underground structures.

After the unbanning of the ANC in 1990, she served the party in various structures, including the ANC Women's League (ANCWL) and actively participated in the relaunch of the ANCWL in the country. Nkoana-Mashabane went on to be appointed as South African High Commissioner to India and Malaysia.

She served as the Chairperson of the ANCWL in Limpopo and as a member of the National Working Committee (NWC) of the organisation from 1992 to 1995.

On her return to South Africa, Nkoana-Mashabane became Limpopo's Local Government and Housing Member of the Executive Council.

In December 2012, Nkoana-Mashabane was re-elected as a member of the National Executive Committee of the ruling party at the party's 53rd National Conference, held in Mangaung, Free State Province. Her first election to the NEC was at the party's December 2007 National Conference, held in the city of Polokwane.

President Jacob Zuma appointed Nkoana-Mashabane as Minister of International Relations and Cooperation on 9 May 2009. Zuma subsequently disputed suggestions that this was an unusual appointment in light of Nkoana-Mashabane's apparent lack of foreign policy experience, saying that "the ANC knows the strengths of this comrade" and noting that she was a member of the ANC National Executive Committee.

During Nkoana-Mashabane's tenure as Minister of International Relations and Cooperation, South Africa became a member of the group of emerging economies under the BRICS (Brazil, Russia, India, China, South Africa) banner. Nkoana-Mashabane was President of the 2011 United Nations Climate Change Conference held in Durban from 28 November to 11 December 2011.

She was sworn in for a second term as Minister of International Relations and Cooperation on 26 May 2014. She is currently a member of the ANC NEC and NWC. In 2015, Ms Nkoana-Mashabane was elected as the Treasurer General of the ANCWL.

In February 2018, she was moved to the Department of Rural Development and Land Reform, and her position was subsequently filled by Lindiwe Sisulu.

Nkoana-Mashabane rose to infamy after an interview on Al-Jazeera (conducted in 1996) where she responded to questions about the state of South Africa by detailing the manner in which she had, in her childhood, carried water pails on her head and subsequently has a hole in her head. She has also continued to be a dogged supporter and defender of disgraced ex-president Jacob Zuma despite his failure to uphold the constitution, his many corruption charges, and his rape charges, and particularly despite his erratic cabinet reshuffles which saw the South African economy lose R5 billion almost overnight.

In May 2019, President Cyril Ramaphosa named Nkoana-Mashabane as Minister of Women, Youth and Persons with Disabilities, succeeding Bathabile Dlamini.

Nkoana-Mashabane unsuccessfully stood for re-election to the ANC NEC at the party's 55th National Conference in December 2022. She was removed as a cabinet minister in a cabinet reshuffle on 6 March 2023. Instead of becoming a backbencher, Nkoana-Mashabane opted to resign her seat in the National Assembly on 15 March 2023.

== Personal life ==
Nkoana-Mashabane's first husband was Frans Mohale, a businessman from Limpopo. They had four children together.

Her second husband was Norman Mashabane, who was recalled from his position as South African Ambassador to Indonesia after sexual harassment charges were laid against him. He was later found guilty on those charges in the Pretoria High Court, and quit his post as political adviser. He died in a car accident outside the provincial capital of Polokwane in 2007.

== Corruption ==
As Minister of International Relations and Cooperation, Nkoana-Mashabane incurred expenditure of R235 000 for a single flight from Norway to Bulgaria. At the Oslo Airport, refusing to have her bag searched and missing her commercial flight, Nkoana-Mashabane insisted on chartering a private jet.

== See also ==
- Department of Foreign Affairs (South Africa)
- Foreign relations of South Africa
- List of foreign ministers in 2017
- List of current foreign ministers

== Sources ==
Media related to Maite Nkoana-Mashabane at Wikimedia Commons

- Short biography and picture
- Statement by President Jacob Zuma on the appointment of the new Cabinet (2009-05-10)

Political offices
Preceded by Bathabile Dlamini as Minister of Women in the Presidency	Minister of Women, Youth and Persons with Disabilities; 2019–2023	Succeeded by Nkosazana Dlamini-Zuma
Political offices
Preceded by Gugile Nkwinti	Minister of Rural Development and Land Reform; 2018–2019	Succeeded by Post dissolved
Political offices
Preceded by Nkosazana Dlamini-Zuma as Minister of Foreign Affairs	Minister of International Relations and Cooperation; 2009–2018	Succeeded by Lindiwe Sisulu
