= Senzeni Zokwana =

South African politician

The Honourable Senzeni Zokwana
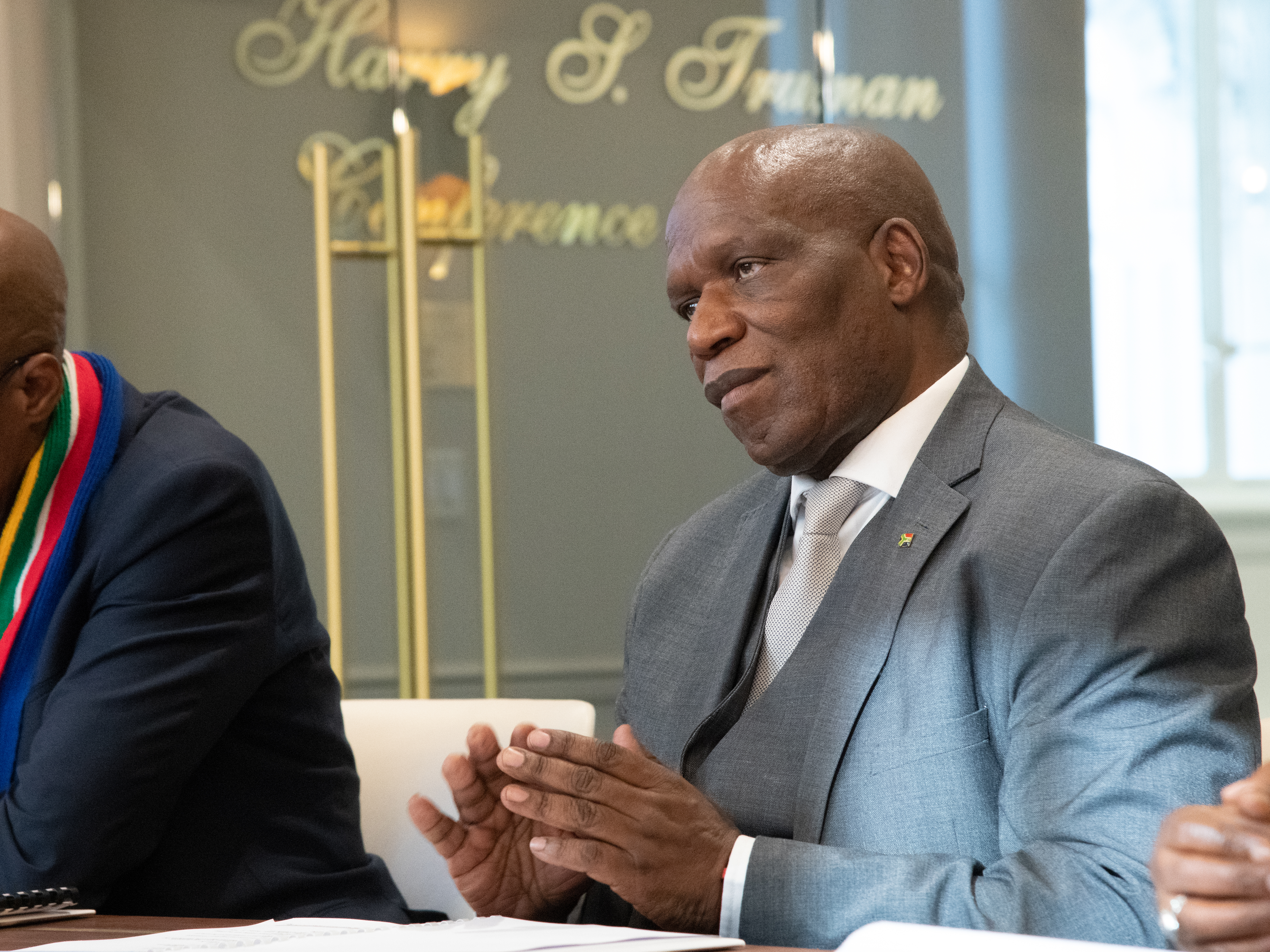

Minister of Agriculture, Forestry and Fisheries
- In office 26 May 2014 – 29 May 2019
- President: Jacob Zuma; Cyril Ramaphosa
- Preceded by: Tina Joemat-Pettersson
- Succeeded by: Position Abolished

Personal details
- Party: African National Congress; South African Communist Party
- Website: https://www.daff.gov.za

Senzeni Zokwana is a South African politician. He is a former Member of Parliament and served until May 2019 as the Minister of Agriculture, Forestry and Fisheries, having been appointed by President Jacob Zuma in May 2014. He previously served as the President of the National Union of Mineworkers (NUM).

== Labour career ==
He became involved in trade union activism in 1980 during the apartheid-era in South Africa at the President Steyn gold mine in the Free State. He joined the ranks of NUM in 1983, became a shaft steward in 1984 and was elected to the branch executive committee in the President Steyn Mine in 1985. He subsequently moved up the ranks to become branch chairperson in 1987, vice regional chairperson in 1992 and regional chairperson from 1993 to 1994. He was first a shift overseer on safety matters and in 1995, he joined the NUM staff as a safety officer, after proving himself a dedicated advocate of modern mine safety techniques. Mr Zokwana was elected as vice president in 1994, a position he held until 2000 when he was elected president. He was subsequently re-elected for the role and held the position until 2014.

In 2005 Zokwana was elected as President of the International Federation of Chemical, Energy, Mine and General Workers' Unions in 2005 and was subsequently re-elected in November 2011. Additionally, he was elected as Vice-President of the global union federation IndustriALL Global Union on June 19, 2012.

== Marikana Massacre ==
On the 16th of August 2012, 34 miners were gunned down by the South African Police Service after they had embarked on a months lengthy strike demanding wage increase. At the centre of this tragedy were the National Police Commissioner Riah Phiyega, Minister of Police Hon. Nathi Mthethwa, the Deputy president and Lonmin director Cyril Ramaphosa, NUM President Mr Senzeni Zokwana, the President of AMCU Mr. Joseph Mathunjwa, Lonmin Manager Mr. Mokoena and General Mpembe.

Trade union offices
Preceded by James Motlatsi	President of the National Union of Mineworkers; 2000–2014	Succeeded by Piet Matosa
