= Gugile Nkwinti =

South African politician

The Honourable Gugile Ernest Nkwinti MP

Minister of Water and Sanitation
- In office 26 February 2018 – 29 May 2019
- President: Cyril Ramaphosa
- Preceded by: Nomvula Mokonyane
- Succeeded by: Position Merged

Minister of Rural Development and Land Reform
- In office 11 May 2009 – 26 February 2018
- President: Jacob Zuma
- Preceded by: new post created
- Succeeded by: Maite Nkoana-Mashabane

Speaker of the Eastern Cape Provincial Legislature
- In office 1994–1999
- Preceded by: new post created

Personal details
- Born: 18 December 1946 (age 79)
- Party: African National Congress
- Education: University of South Africa (B.A.); University of London (Masters)

Gugile Ernest Nkwinti (born 18 December 1946) is a South African politician, previously serving in the Cabinet of South Africa as the Minister of Water and Sanitation and before as the Minister of Rural Development and Land Reform.

== Education and career ==
He holds a diploma in nursing (psychiatry) as well as a bachelor's degree in Political Science, Public Administration and Applied Economics at Unisa. From 1972 to 1984, he worked as a professional nurse. From 1984 to 1989, he worked for the UDF, in the Eastern Cape, and he also worked as a research assistant in the department of psychology at Rhodes University. From 1990 to 1991, he served as the UDF and ANC regional secretary in the Eastern Cape. In 1994, he became the speaker of the Eastern Cape Provincial Legislature, and in 1999, he was elected as MEC for housing, local government and traditional affairs in the province. 2004 saw him holding on to his position as MEC for housing and local government, and in 2009, he was appointed as minister of rural development and land reform.

== Current land reform policy ==
Southern African land reform is a contentious issue. He has stated that the funds are unavailable to reach the target of redistributing 30% of arable land back to the black majority by 2014. Rather advocating a partial policy of reforming reclaimed, but unproductive land (up to 90% according to Nkwinti). He has stated that Nationalisation is not an option, but left future land reform policy to future national debate. He has made contentious statements, on the local news, eNCA, that commercial farmers must co-operate or share a fate "worse than Zimbabwe". Drawing critical reactions from the agricultural union, TAU SA, and the Freedom Front Plus and later, calls for clarity from the Democratic Alliance. Has previously suggested a policy of no compensation.

== Controversy ==
Nkwinti was accused of conflict of interest and bribery after admitting to have received 2 Million Rand from his friends Errol Velile Present and his partner Moses Boshomane, who received a farm from the department of agriculture rural development and land reform which became derelict after being handed over.
