= Zoliswa Kota-Mpeko =

South African politician (born 1956)

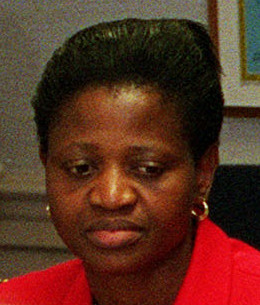
- Kota-Mpeko in 2000

Member of the National Assembly
- In office 16 November 2021 – 28 May 2024
- In office 9 May 1994 – 7 May 2019

Deputy Minister of Human Settlements
- In office 11 May 2009 – 7 May 2019
- President: Jacob Zuma; Cyril Ramaphosa
- Minister: Tokyo Sexwale; Connie September; Lindiwe Sisulu; Nomaindia Mfeketo
- Succeeded by: Ministry reconfigured

Personal details
- Born: 4 April 1956 (age 70) Cape Town, Cape Province; Union of South Africa
- Education: University of the Western Cape
- Nicknames: Zou; Zoe; Zo

Zoliswa Albertina Kota-Mpeko (formerly Kota-Fredericks and Kota-Hendricks; born 4 April 1956) is a South African politician from the Western Cape. A member of the African National Congress (ANC), she served as Deputy Minister of Human Settlements between May 2009 and May 2019. She served six terms in the National Assembly of South Africa.

Born and raised in Cape Town, Kota-Mpeko became politically active as a student activist in the anti-apartheid movement. She rose to prominence as the provincial publicity secretary of the United Democratic Front. After living in exile with the ANC between 1985 and 1991, she returned to represent the party at the Convention for a Democratic South Africa. In the first post-apartheid elections in May 1994, she ran her first provincial election campaign for the ANC and was elected to a seat in the National Assembly.

She served continuously in the National Assembly between May 1994 and May 2019, first leaving the backbenches to serve as chairperson of the Portfolio Committee on Housing from 2002 to 2009. After the April 2009 general election, President Jacob Zuma appointed her as Deputy Minister of Human Settlements, and over the next decade she held that position under four consecutive ministers.

She lost her parliamentary seat in the May 2019 general election and thereafter spent two years as the chairperson of a tech company linked to Iqbal Survé. Between November 2021 and May 2024, she returned to the National Assembly as a backbencher, filling a casual vacancy in the ANC caucus, but she was not nominated for re-election in the 2024 general election. A former provincial chairperson of the Western Cape branch of the ANC Women's League, she was a member of the ANC Provincial Executive Committee between 1992 and 2023, when she failed to gain re-election.

== Early life and education ==
Born on 4 April 1956, Kota-Mpeko was born and raised in Cape Town. She attended Langa High School in the township of Langa, where she became involved in anti-apartheid politics as a teenager. She was involved in student solidarity marches during Mozambican independence in 1974, and she was a member of the coordinating committee of the August 1976 student protests organised in solidarity with the Soweto uprising.

After she matriculated, she was active in political and community organisations in Cape Town, including the Young Christian Workers, the Azanian Students' Organisation, the Congress of South African Students, the Cape Youth Congress, and the Ikhwezi Community Centre in Gugulethu. In 1983, she was a founding member and inaugural secretary of the United Women's Organisation, and she became the publicity secretary of the Western Cape branch of the United Democratic Front (UDF) after the UDF was founded later that year. She also studied social work at the University of the Western Cape, although she did not complete her degree.

== Exile and transition ==
After she was detained by the apartheid state under Section 29 of the Internal Security Act, Kota-Mpeko left South Africa in 1985 to go into exile. Beginning her exile in Lesotho and then in Zambia, she joined the African National Congress (ANC) and its military wing, Umkhonto we Sizwe. She received military training in Angola and the Soviet Union. Thereafter, from 1987 to 1991, she represented the ANC at its mission in Isla de la Juventud, Cuba.

Kota-Mpeko returned to South Africa during the negotiations to end apartheid. She was a member of the ANC delegation to the Convention for a Democratic South Africa (CODESA) and also served on the CODESA Gender Advisory Committee. She also resumed her role as UDF provincial publicity secretary, but the UDF was gradually being subsumed into the ANC; she was elected to the ANC's Provincial Executive Committee in the Western Cape in 1992. More importantly, in 1993, she was appointed as the Western Cape ANC's elections coordinator, in which capacity she led its provincial campaign ahead of the first democratic elections in April 1994.

== Post-apartheid political career ==
=== Ordinary Member of Parliament: 1994–2009 ===
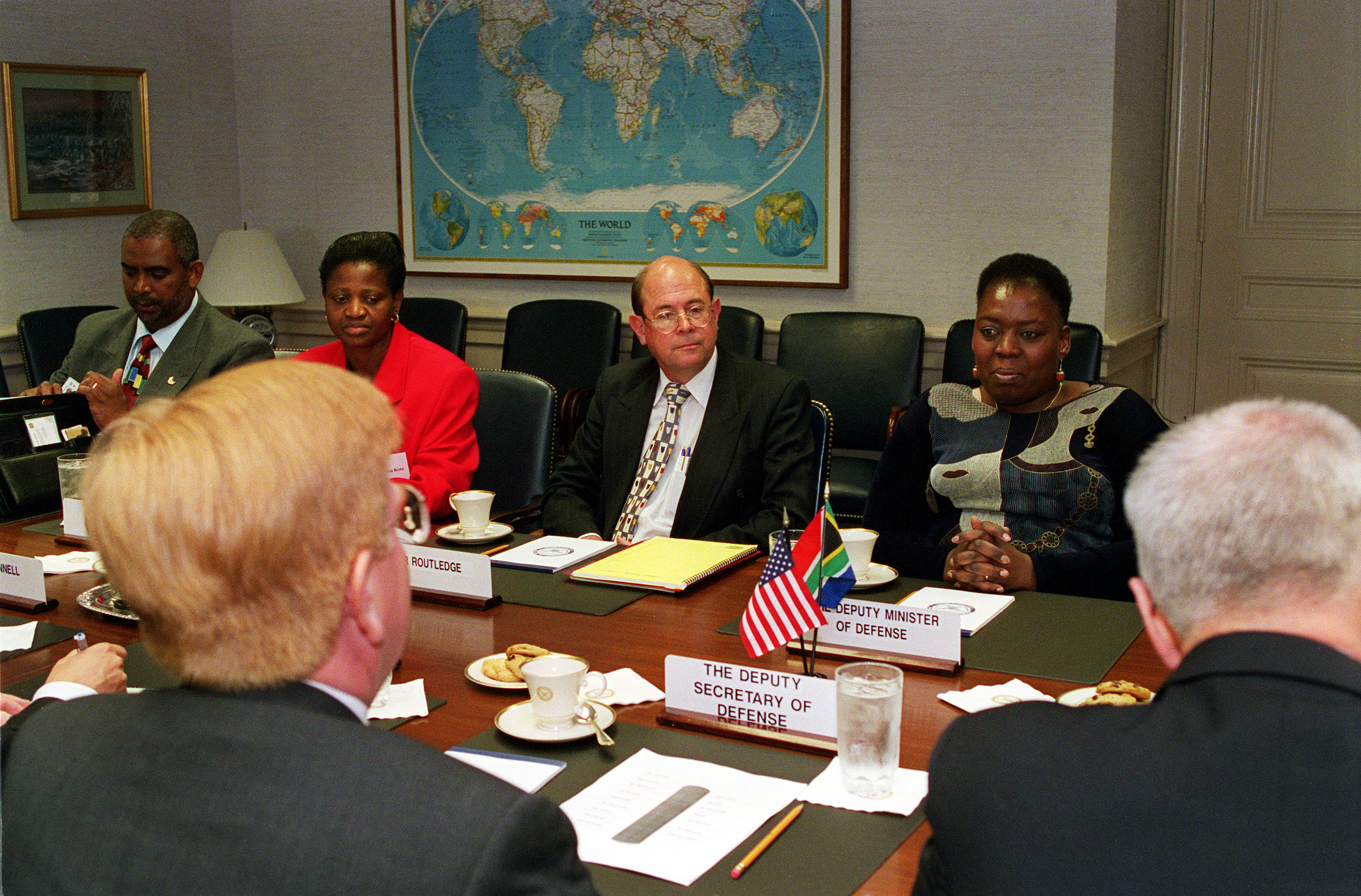
Kota-Mpeko (second from left) with American Deputy Defence Secretary Rudy de Leon and South African Deputy Defence Minister Nozizwe Madlala-Routledge at a meeting in the Pentagon, 16 October 2000. Kota-Mpeko was the ANC's whip in the Portfolio Committee on Defence.

In the April 1994 election, Kota-Mpeko was elected to represent the ANC in the National Assembly, the lower house of the new South African Parliament. During her first three terms in the National Assembly – she was re-elected to her seat in June 1999 and April 2004 – she was an ordinary Member of Parliament, serving on the Portfolio Committee on Sport and Recreation, the Joint Standing Committee on Defence, and the Portfolio Committee on Defence. She ultimately became a committee whip in the Portfolio Committee on Defence, and in 2002, in a midterm caucus reshuffle, she was promoted to become chairperson of the Portfolio Committee on Housing. She was retained in the housing chairmanship after the 2004 election.

At the same time, in 2003, Kota-Mpeko was elected to serve a term as provincial chairperson of the ANC Women's League in the Western Cape, and in that capacity she represented the league in the Progressive Women's Movement after it was launched in 2006; she was a member of the movement's provincial steering committee. She also remained a member of the Provincial Executive Committee of the mainstream ANC.

Ahead of the ANC's 52nd National Conference in 2007, she was nominated to stand for election to the party's National Executive Committee. However, she was not elected. Indeed, according to the Mail & Guardian, she supported Thabo Mbeki's unsuccessful campaign to be re-elected to a third term as ANC president at the conference, making her political position highly precarious.

=== Deputy Minister of Human Settlements: 2009–2019 ===
Kota-Mpeko was nonetheless re-elected to her parliamentary seat in the April 2009 general election, now as a member of the National Assembly's Western Cape caucus. Announcing his first-term cabinet on 10 May 2009, newly elected President Jacob Zuma appointed her as Deputy Minister of Human Settlements, in which capacity she deputised Minister Tokyo Sexwale.

Less than six months into her new job, Kota-Mpeko was hospitalised after a car accident on the N1 near Leeu-Gamka, Western Cape; two people were killed in the accident. She remained hospitalised for over a month, and Minister Sexwale lent her his personal Challenger 300 for her transfer from a George hospital to one in Cape Town.

In 2011 Kota-Mpeko briefly served as interim provincial leader of the Western Cape ANC, after Mcebisi Skwatsha's elected leadership corps was disbanded. The following year, she again stood unsuccessfully for election to the ANC National Executive Committee, this time at the party's 53rd National Conference. She was retained as Deputy Minister after Zuma reshuffled the executive in mid-2013, replacing Sexwale with new Minister Connie September. In addition, the ANC appointed her to lead its Western Cape election campaign ahead of the 2014 general election; she said that her strategy was to focus on attracting young voters, especially in the poor townships of Khayelitsha and Delft.

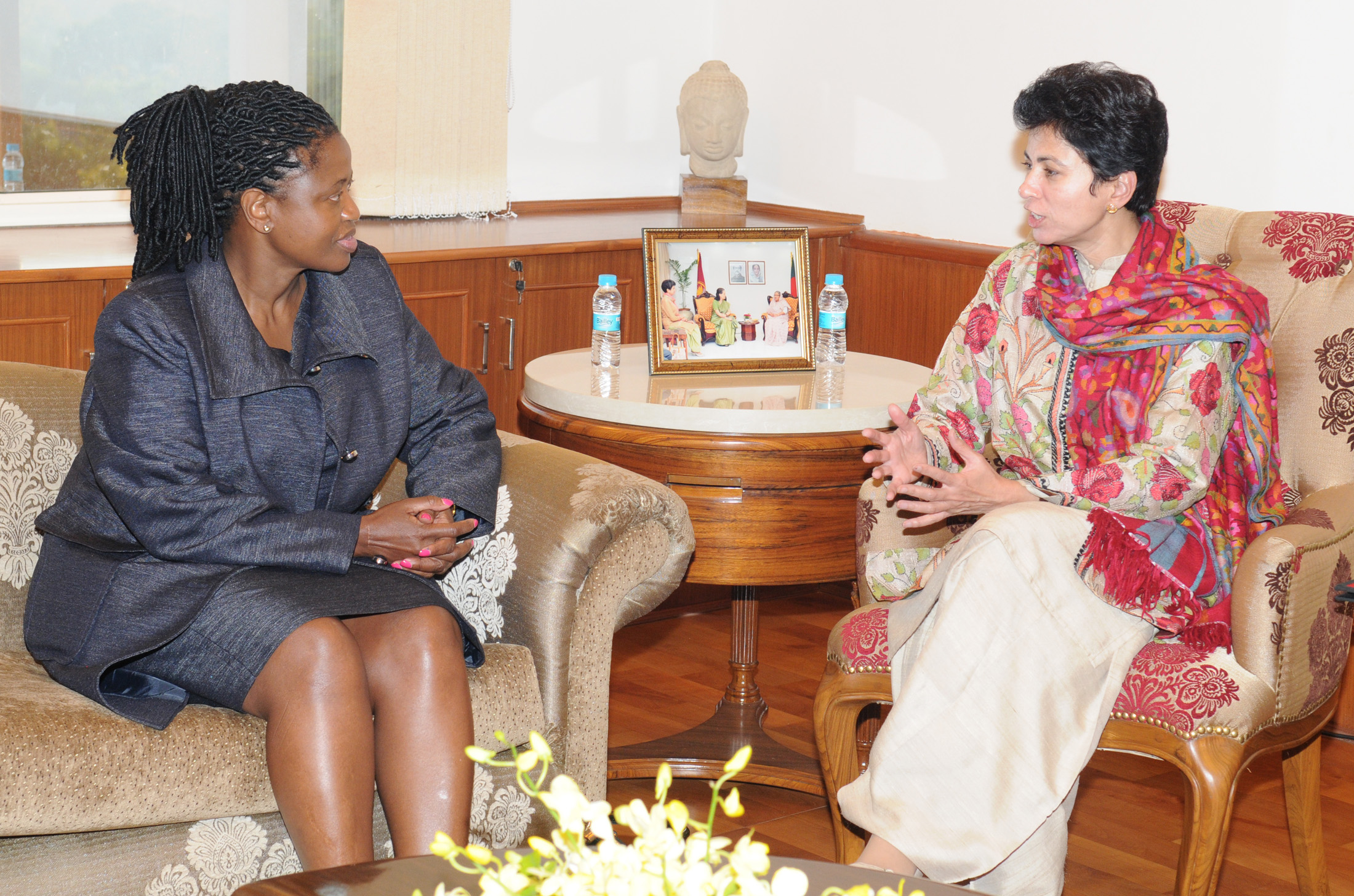
Kota-Mpeko meets with Indian Union Minister of Housing Selja Kumari in New Delhi, 23 January 2012

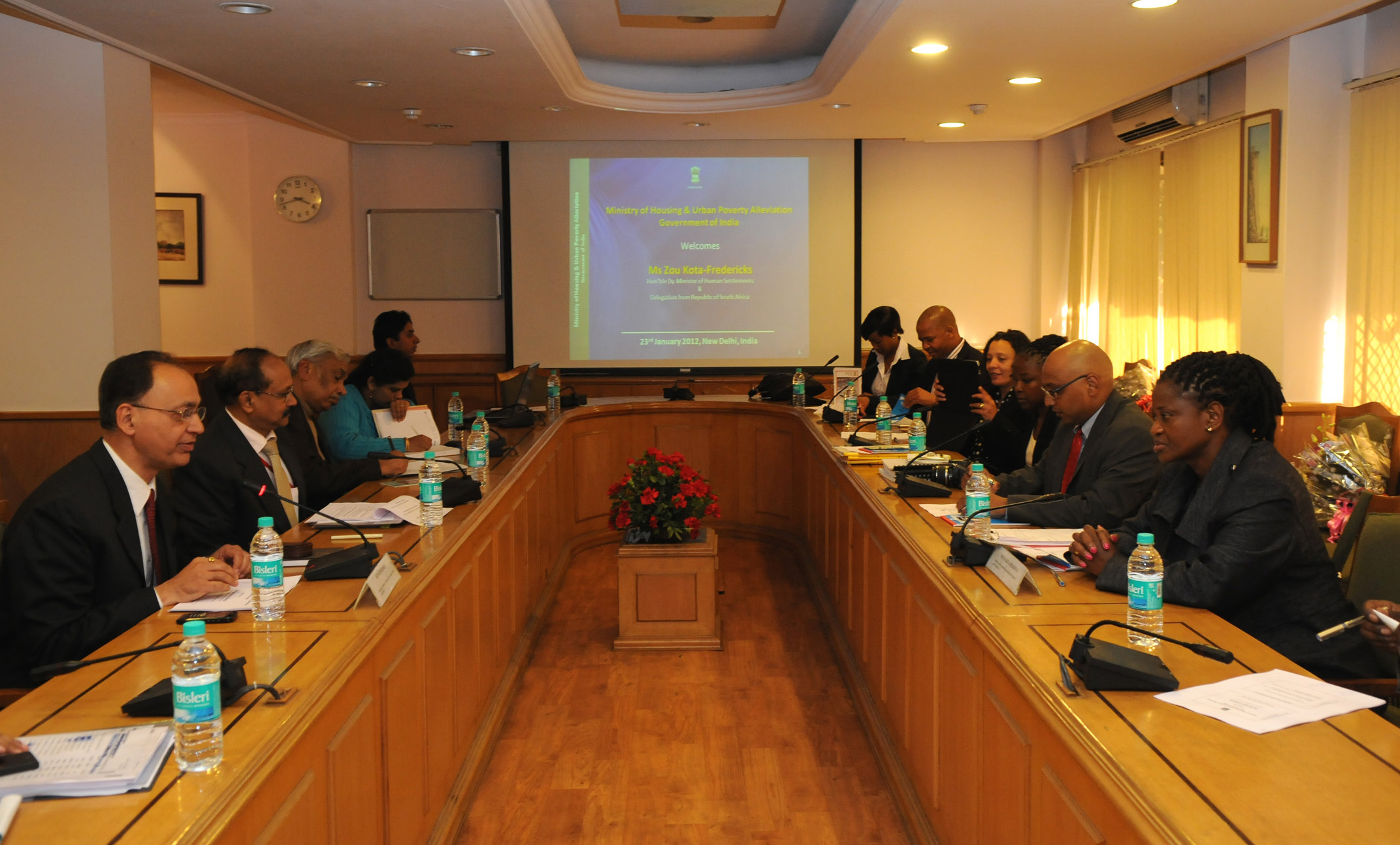
Kota-Mpeko (front right) in a bilateral meeting in New Delhi, 23 January 2012

When the Western Cape ANC nominated its candidates for the election, she was the most popular candidate for the ANC provincial party list. Ranked first on that list, she was comfortably re-elected to the National Assembly when the election was held in May 2014. Announcing his second-term cabinet on 25 May, Zuma reappointed her as Deputy Minister of Human Settlements, now serving under Minister Lindiwe Sisulu. At the ANC's next provincial elective conference in June 2015, she was touted as a possible candidate for the position of Deputy Provincial Chairperson, but Khaya Magaxa was elected to that office and Kota-Mpeko merely gained re-election as an ordinary member of the Provincial Executive Committee.

She served as Deputy Minister of Human Settlements throughout the Fifth Parliament, remaining in the ministry after President Cyril Ramaphosa replaced Zuma in a February 2018 midterm presidential election. Ramaphosa appointed Nomaindia Mfeketo to succeed Sisulu as Minister.

=== Hiatus from Parliament: 2019–2021 ===
In the May 2019 general election, Kota-Mpeko was ranked 133rd on the ANC's national party list, and she lost her seat in the National Assembly. Over the next two years, she took a hiatus from frontline politics. She remained active in the Western Cape ANC: in August 2019, Marius Fransman's leadership corps was dissolved, and Kota-Mpeko was appointed to the 30-member interim committee, headed by Lerumo Kalako, that led the provincial party thereafter.

At the same time, amaBhungane reported that Kota-Mpeko became an important figure in Iqbal Survé's business empire: having served on the board of Survé's Sekunjalo Investments before her appointment as a deputy minister, she had been appointed as a director of six different Survé-linked companies on 1 March 2019 in the run-up to the election. One of them was 4Plus, a tech company of which she became board chairperson; she led an investment company called Women's Technology Investments which had a controlling stake in 4Plus. In 2020 and 2021, amaBhungane claimed that 4Plus was being used to distribute Public Investment Corporation funding to Survé's business interests.

=== Return to the backbenches: 2021–2024 ===
On 16 November 2021, Kota-Mpeko was sworn in to an ANC seat in the National Assembly, filling the casual vacancy created by Hlengiwe Mkhize's death. She served as an ordinary member of the Standing Committee on the Auditor-General from February 2022 until the end of the Sixth Parliament. During this period, in June 2023, the Western Cape ANC held its first provincial elective conference since 2015. Kota-Mpeko was not elected to return to the Provincial Executive Committee elected by the conference. She also was not nominated to stand for re-election to the National Assembly in the next general election in May 2024.
