= Lindiwe Sisulu =

South African politician (born 1954)

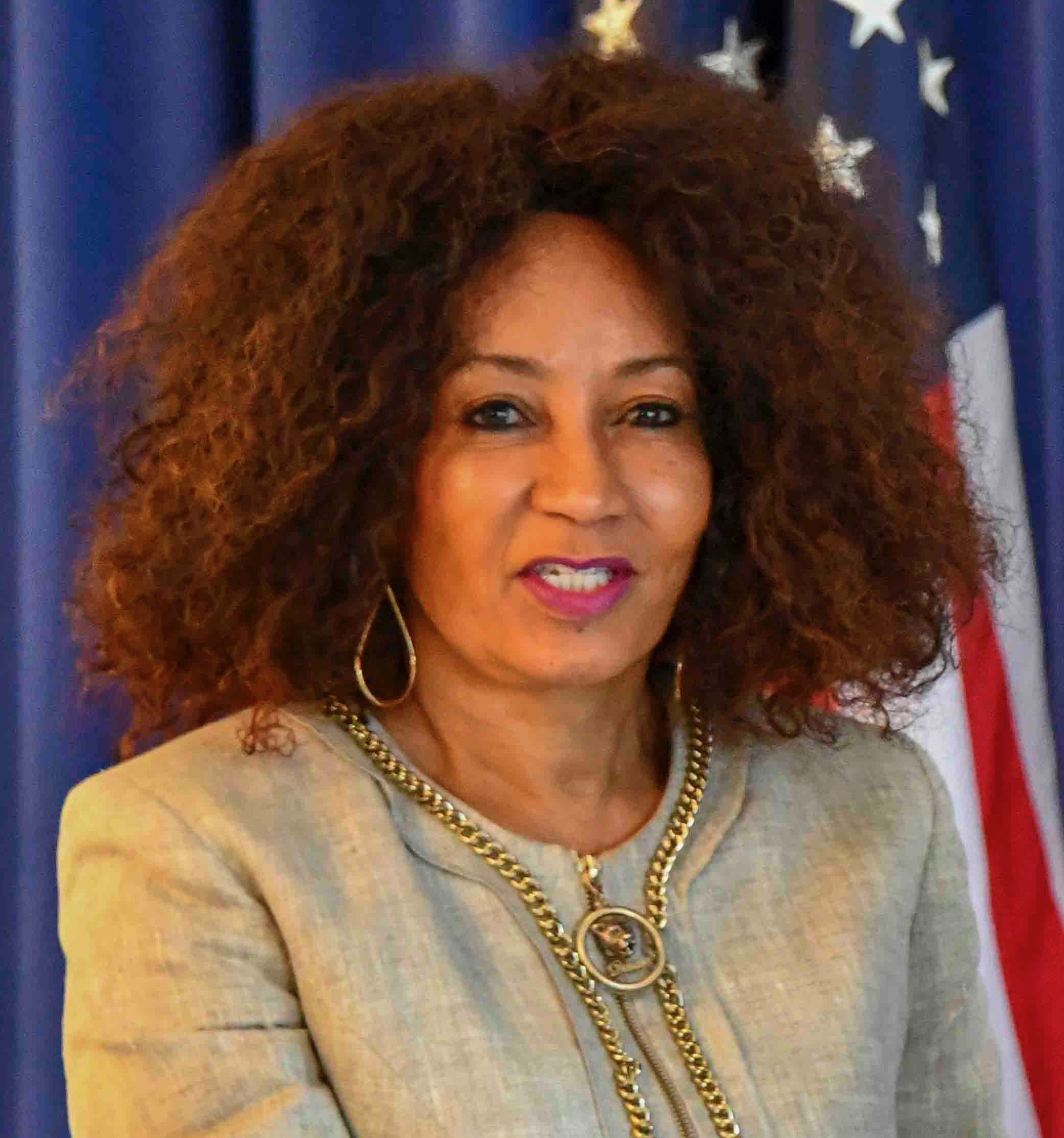
- Sisulu in 2018

Minister of Tourism
- In office 5 August 2021 – 6 March 2023
- President: Cyril Ramaphosa
- Preceded by: Mmamoloko Kubayi-Ngubane
- Succeeded by: Patricia de Lille

Minister of Human Settlements, Water and Sanitation
- In office 30 May 2019 – 5 August 2021
- President: Cyril Ramaphosa
- Preceded by: Portfolio established
- Succeeded by: Portfolio abolished
Prior cabinet offices 2001–2019
Minister of International Relations and Cooperation
In office 27 February 2018 – 29 May 2019
President	Cyril Ramaphosa
Deputy	Reginah Mhaule
Preceded by	Maite Nkoana-Mashabane
Succeeded by	Naledi Pandor
Minister of Human Settlements
In office 26 May 2014 – 26 February 2018
President	Jacob Zuma; Cyril Ramaphosa
Preceded by	Connie September
Succeeded by	Nomaindia Mfeketo
Minister of Public Service and Administration
In office 12 June 2012 – 25 May 2014
President	Jacob Zuma
Preceded by	Roy Padayachie
Succeeded by	Collins Chabane
Minister of Defence
In office 10 May 2009 – 12 June 2012
President	Jacob Zuma
Preceded by	Charles Nqakula
Succeeded by	Nosiviwe Mapisa-Nqakula
Minister of Housing
In office 29 April 2004 – 10 May 2009
President	Thabo Mbeki; Kgalema Motlanthe
Preceded by	Rob Davies
Succeeded by	Tokyo Sexwale (for Human Settlements)
Minister of Intelligence
In office 24 January 2001 – 28 April 2004
President	Thabo Mbeki
Preceded by	Joe Nhlanhla
Succeeded by	Ronnie Kasrils

Member of the National Assembly
- In office 27 April 1994 – 15 March 2023

Personal details
- Born: Lindiwe Nonceba Sisulu; 10 May 1954 (age 72) Johannesburg, Transvaal; Union of South Africa
- Party: African National Congress
- Spouse(s): Xolile Guma (divorced) Rok Ajulu (died 2016)
- Parent(s): Walter and Albertina
- Education: Waterford Kamhlaba
- Alma mater: University of Swaziland (BA); University of York (MA, MPhil)

Military service
- Allegiance: Umkhonto We Sizwe

Lindiwe Nonceba Sisulu (born 10 May 1954) is a South African politician. She represented the African National Congress (ANC) in the National Assembly of South Africa between April 1994 and March 2023. During that time, from 2001 to 2023, she served continuously in the cabinet as a minister under four consecutive presidents. President Cyril Ramaphosa sacked her from his cabinet in March 2023, precipitating her resignation from the National Assembly.

The daughter of anti-apartheid leaders Albertina and Walter Sisulu, Sisulu was born in Johannesburg and attended boarding school in neighbouring Swaziland. After suffering prolonged detention without trial in 1976–1977, she left South Africa, aged 23, and joined Umkhonto we Sizwe in exile. She lived primarily in Swaziland and England until 1990, when she returned to South Africa during the negotiations to end apartheid. Elected to the National Assembly in South Africa's first post-apartheid elections, she became the inaugural chairperson of Parliament's Joint Standing Committee on Intelligence, and she went on to serve in Nelson Mandela's Government of National Unity as Deputy Minister of Home Affairs from 1996 to 2001.

Under President Thabo Mbeki, Sisulu served as Minister of Intelligence from 2001 to 2004 and as Minister of Housing from 2004 to 2009. Under President Jacob Zuma, she was Minister of Defence and Military Veterans from 2009 to 2012, Minister of Public Service and Administration from 2012 to 2014, and (returned to her former portfolio) Minister of Human Settlements from 2014 to 2018. President Ramaphosa appointed her as Minister of International Relations and Cooperation in February 2018, but her tenure in that position was brief: after the 2019 general election, she was moved to the newly created position of Minister of Human Settlements, Water and Sanitation. Finally, in a cabinet reshuffle in August 2021, she was demoted to Minister of Tourism, her last position in government.

Known for her "relentless" political ambition, she campaigned for election to the ANC presidency ahead of the party's 54th National Conference in 2017 and its 55th National Conference in 2022. Her 2022 campaign was notable for its populism. Neither campaign received enough support to advance a presidential nomination. She did appear on the 2017 ballot as Ramaphosa's running mate, but David Mabuza won the deputy presidential slot. Sisulu has been a member of the ANC National Executive Committee since December 1997; she was re-elected to a sixth five-year term in December 2022. She also served four terms as a member of the ANC National Working Committee between 2003 and 2022.

== Early life and career ==
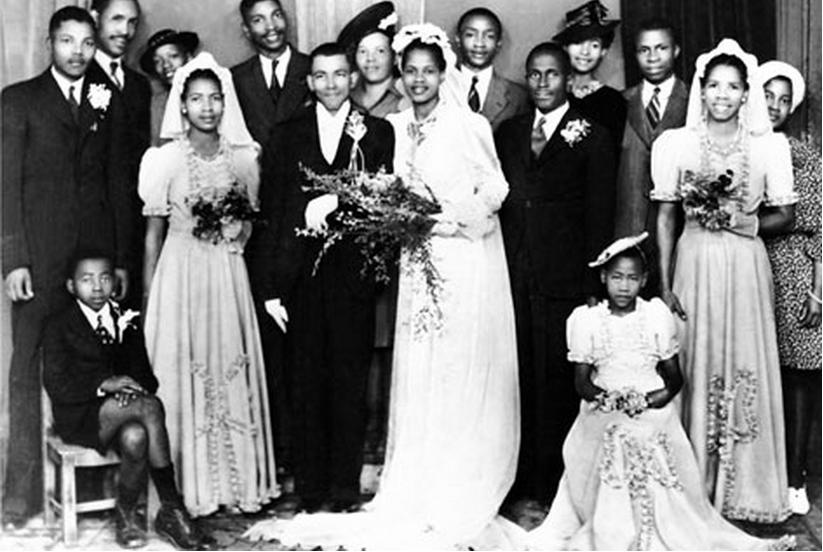
The wedding of Walter Sisulu and Albertina Thetiwe in 1944 (with groomsmen Nelson Mandela and Anton Lembede)

Sisulu was born on 10 May 1954 in Johannesburg. She had three elder brothers – Max, Mlungisi, and Zwelakhe – and a younger sister named Nonkululeko. Their parents, Walter and Albertina Sisulu, were prominent anti-apartheid activists; Walter was the secretary-general of the African National Congress (ANC) in 1954, and he was sentenced to life imprisonment ten years later in the Rivonia Trial. During her childhood, Sisulu therefore corresponded with her father by post; after the first moon landing, she wrote to tell him that she hoped to become "the first African woman in space" and he encouraged her to pursue her ambition.

Having attended boarding school since childhood, Sisulu completed high school outside South Africa at St Michael's School and Waterford Kamhlaba in neighbouring Swaziland. She graduated in 1973 with the Cambridge General Certificate of Education: Advanced Level. She studied Latin in school, intending to pursue a legal education in Britain, but was a denied a passport. Instead, she enrolled in a history and politics degree at the University of Swaziland. During this period, to her mother's disapproval, she became interested in Black Consciousness politics.

=== Detention: 1976–1977 ===
On 13 June 1976, at home in Johannesburg between semesters, Sisulu was arrested by the South African Police on suspicion of association with the banned ANC. She was detained without trial under the Terrorism Act for the next eleven months, held in jails at John Vorster Square, Hartbeespoort, Nylstroom, and the Pretoria Central Prison. Under interrogation, she suffered electric torture, sexual torture, and isolation; she was also told, falsely, that her family members had died or been arrested. Her father, himself still imprisoned, wrote a lengthy letter to Jimmy Kruger, the Minister of Justice, noting her depression and expressing concern that "the sins of her parents are being visited on her head". Her mother later said that Sisulu was "terribly affected" by her torture. She was released from detention in July 1977 and, shortly afterwards, she left South Africa to live permanently in exile.

=== Exile: 1977–1990 ===
After a sojourn with Ruth First in Maputo, Mozambique, Sisulu joined Umkhonto we Sizwe, the exiled military wing of the ANC, later in 1977. Over the next two years, she received military training under its auspices, with a specialism in military intelligence; according to her official résumé, she was admitted to the Order of the Red Star for her performance on a Soviet training course. In 1980, she returned to Swaziland, where she continued her work for the ANC and where she resumed her education: she completed her BA at the University of Swaziland, followed by diploma in education in 1980 and an Honours in history in 1981.

She spent her early career in education in Swaziland, teaching at Manzini Central High School in 1981 and at the University of Swaziland's history department in 1982; she was also a sub-editor for the Mbabane-based Times of Swaziland in 1983. From 1983 to 1984, she lived in England on an Oppenheimer Scholarship, completing an MA in history at the University of York's Centre for Southern African Studies. She returned briefly to Swaziland from 1985 to 1987, working at Manzini Teachers Training College, but then went back to York to complete her MPhil. Her MPhil thesis, completed in 1989, was entitled, "Women at Work and Liberation Struggle in South Africa". According to her résumé, the degree was upgraded to a DPhil in the same year.

=== Return to South Africa: 1990 ===
Sisulu returned to South Africa in April 1990 amid the negotiations to end apartheid; her father, recently released from prison, met her at Jan Smuts Airport in Johannesburg. For the next three years, she worked for the ANC, which had been unbanned by the apartheid government. She was personal assistant to Jacob Zuma, who was then the chief of the ANC's intelligence department, in 1990; the ANC's chief administrator at the Convention for a Democratic South Africa in 1991; and an administrator in the ANC's intelligence department in 1992. Later in 1992, she worked briefly as a consultant to the UNESCO National Children's Rights Committee, and in 1993 she was the director of the Govan Mbeki Research Fellowship at the University of Fort Hare. In late 1993, she returned to ANC work as a member of Transitional Executive Council's sub-council on intelligence.

== Early political career ==
When South Africa's first post-apartheid elections were held in April 1994, Sisulu was elected to represent the ANC in the National Assembly, the lower house of the new South African Parliament. The Intelligence Control Act created Parliament's Joint Standing Committee on Intelligence in 1995 and she was elected to chair the committee.

However, in June 1996 – less than a year into her tenure as committee chairperson – Sisulu was promoted to the position of Deputy Minister of Home Affairs in President Nelson Mandela's Government of National Unity. She ultimately held that position from June 1996 to January 2001, and she deputised Minister Mangosuthu Buthelezi, the leader of the opposition Inkatha Freedom Party. While serving as Deputy Minister, Sisulu attended the ANC's 50th National Conference in Mafikeng in December 1997, at which she was elected for the first time to the party's National Executive Committee.

== Ministerial career ==
=== Intelligence: 2001–2004 ===
After the 1999 general election, newly elected President Thabo Mbeki initially retained Sisulu and Buthelezi in the Home Affairs portfolio. In January 2001, however, he announced a cabinet reshuffle which saw Sisulu join the cabinet as Minister of Intelligence, replacing Joe Nhlanhla. In that capacity, in 2003, she established the Intelligence Services Council.

In December 2002, the ANC's 51st National Conference elected Sisulu to a second term as a member of the National Executive Committee; by number of votes received, she was the 13th-most popular candidate of the 60 ordinary members elected to the committee. She was also elected to the smaller National Working Committee for the first time.

=== Housing: 2004–2009 ===
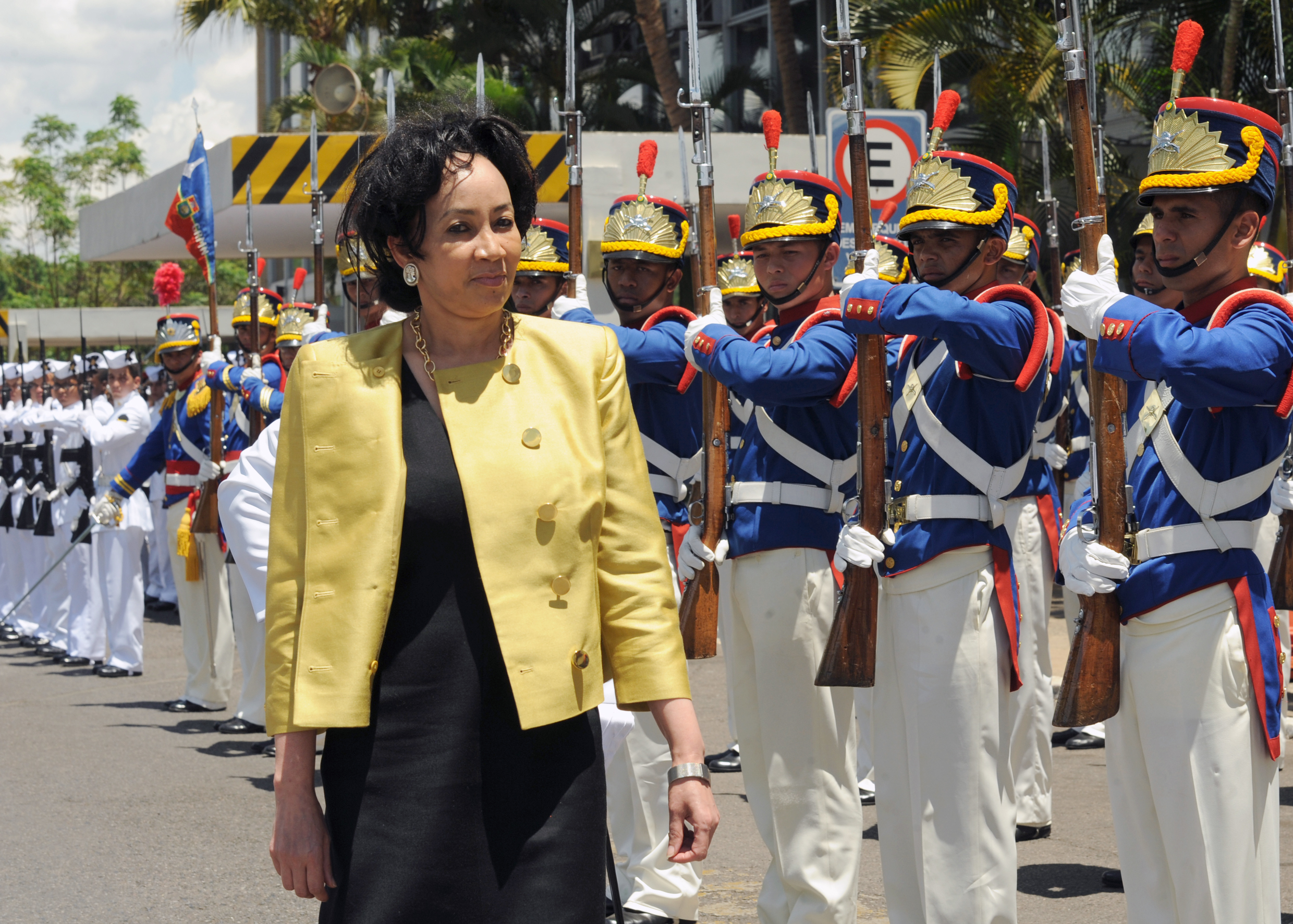
Sisulu during a visit to Brazil in September 2009

After the 2004 general election, Sisulu was appointed as Minister of Housing in Mbeki's second cabinet. She served in that portfolio throughout the Third South African Parliament of April 2004 to May 2009, through Mbeki's second term and the brief term of Mbeki's successor, President Kgalema Motlanthe. During Sisulu's tenure, the Department of Housing established the Housing Development Agency and prioritised the construction of new government housing. Her work in the department attracted awards from the Institute for Housing of South Africa, in 2004, and the International Association for Housing Science, in 2005.

==== N2 Gateway project ====
Sisulu's flagship housing project, launched in February 2005, was the N2 Gateway Project, an extremely ambitious pilot program to build housing in Cape Town in place of informal settlements. It was highly controversial and met sustained civic resistance from those who were displaced during construction. This opposition peaked in December 2007, when residents of the Joe Slovo settlement, who had been removed to Delft, launched a major occupation of the newly built N2 houses, leading to eviction proceedings in the Constitutional Court. Sisulu was criticised for threatening publicly that residents who did not "cooperate" would be removed from the waiting list for government housing, and academic Martin Legassick excoriated her for refusing to meet with the occupiers and, more generally, for failing to consult affected communities.

While admiring Sisulu for "dreaming large", the Mail & Guardian said that, by the end of 2008, the N2 Gateway had become "the decomposing albatross around the minister's elegant neck", in large part because Sisulu's implementation of the project depended on "the forced removals of poor people to the periphery of cities". The project ultimately yielded 16,740 homes at a cost of R2.7 billion.

==== Polokwane conference ====
In December 2007 in Polokwane, the ANC held its hotly contested 52nd National Conference, at which former Deputy President Jacob Zuma (Sisulu's former supervisor in ANC intelligence) ousted Mbeki from the party presidency. Although most of Mbeki's cabinet failed to gain re-election to the National Executive Committee, Sisulu was re-elected as the seventh-most popular candidate; she was also returned to the National Working Committee.

Some observers, including R. W. Johnson, explained Sisulu's rise as a result of her having "quietly joined the Zuma camp" in the run-up to the conference, abandoning Mbeki; according to Mark Gevisser, her relationship with Mbeki had soured during his second term, partly due to her perceived demotion from the Intelligence portfolio to the Housing portfolio. Sisulu herself later said of the Mbeki–Zuma leadership contest that, "We didn’t know what we were doing; we were caught up in factions", and that she had believed Zuma was "our best bet" to prevent Mbeki from winning an "unconstitutional" third term in the ANC presidency.

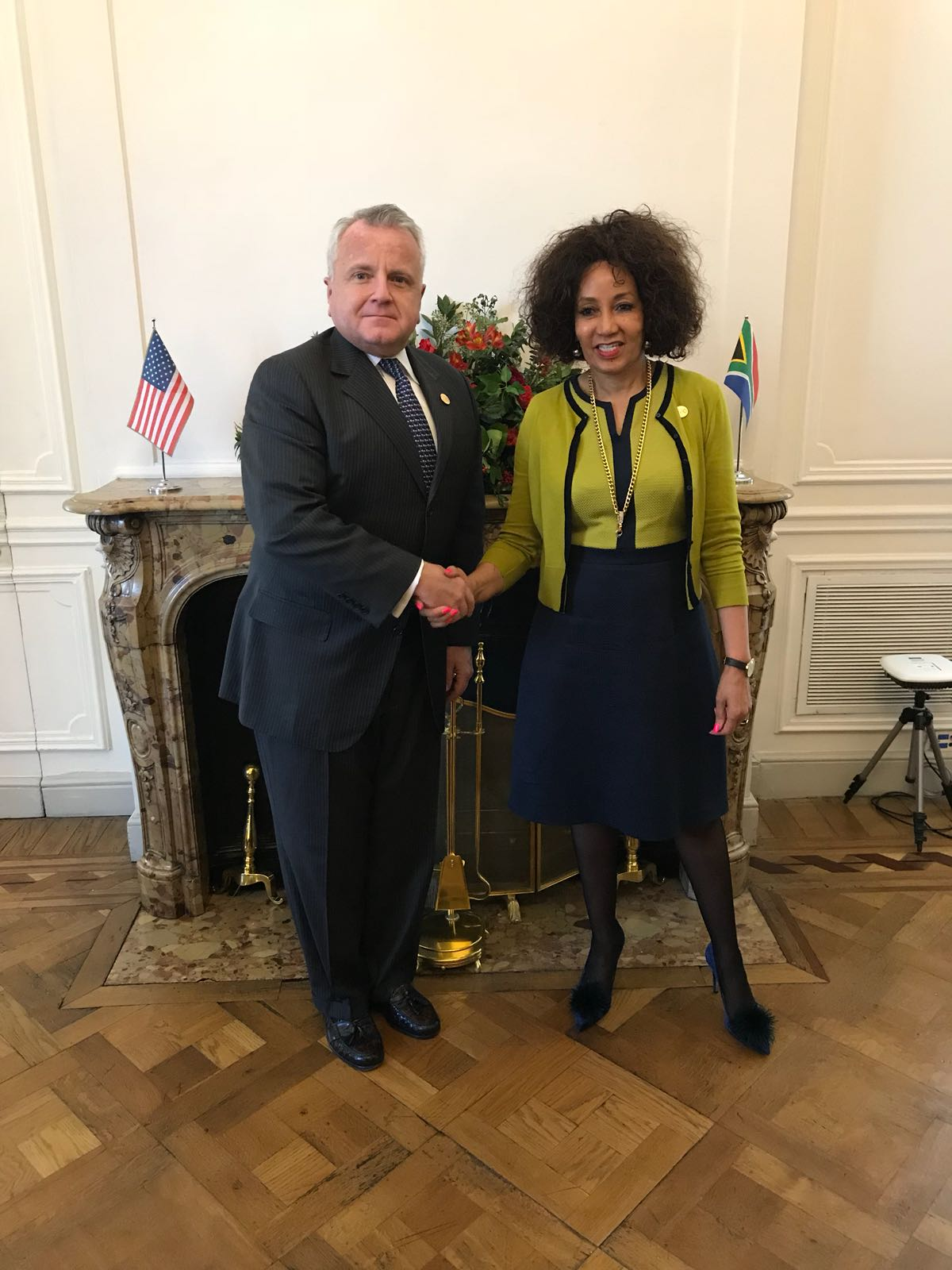
Sisulu with American Deputy Secretary of State John Sullivan at a G20 meeting in May 2018

=== Defence and Military Veterans: 2009–2012 ===
Pursuant to the next general election in April 2009, Zuma was elected as national president and appointed Sisulu to his cabinet as Minister of Defence and Military Veterans. In that portfolio she succeeded Charles Nqakula and was deputised by Thabang Makwetla. Soon into her term, she received media attention for appointing Paul Ngobeni, a controversial lawyer and fugitive from justice in the American state of Connecticut, as her legal adviser. The appointment was criticised by figures inside the defence establishment, as well as by the opposition Democratic Alliance (DA), which said it was part of a pattern of providing jobs for Zuma's "political friends". Two years later, she was criticised for appointing Tony Yengeni to the committee of the South African Defence Review 2012.

==== SANDF de-unionisation ====
The defining policy issue of Sisulu's tenure in the Ministry of Defence was her prolonged conflict with the South African National Defence Union (SANDU). The conflict began in August 2009, when striking SANDU members lodged a violent protest at the Union Buildings. Sisulu responded strongly, sending dismissal notices to some 1,300 soldiers who were involved in the protest. Although the dismissals were reversed in the following weeks, Sisulu became committed to a policy of de-unionising the South African National Defence Force on the grounds that unionisation presented a security risk. The Constitutional Court had affirmed the military's constitutional right to unionise in SANDU v Minister of Defence, but Sisulu said in December 2010 that she was prepared to undertake the necessary constitutional amendments. In the interim, Sisulu and SANDU frequently traded public attacks; in one statement, she called SANDU "the greatest danger to national security" and "a union that spread lies to remain relevant", and SANDU called for Sisulu to be removed from her office.

==== Executive jet flights ====
Shortly after Sisulu left the Defence Ministry, the opposition DA launched a campaign to scrutinise her use of luxury jets for travel while she was Defence Minister. In October 2012, in response to a parliamentary question from the DA, the Defence Ministry reported that Sisulu had chartered 203 private Gulfstream flights, at a cost of over R40 million to the South African Air Force, between 2009 and 2012. DA representative David Maynier called this "a staggering waste of public funds", and the Congress of South African Trade Unions joined the DA in calling for an investigation.

However, Sisulu strongly denied the Defence Ministry's account, insisting that she had only chartered 35 flights – the rest had been taken on VIP jets owned by the Air Force. Sisulu asked her successor in the Defence Ministry, Nosiviwe Mapisa-Nqakula, to withdraw the original parliamentary response, leading to a series of mutual public recriminations between the two ministers; Sisulu ultimately laid a formal complaint against Mapisa-Nqakula and threatened to sue her. The Ministry did withdraw its initial response, acknowledging that it was factually incorrect.

In the interim, Sisulu also entered into a spat with Maynier; in November 2012, arguing with him about the flights during a parliamentary debate, she proposed that, "DA MP Maynier with his flea-infested body should rather sit down". Sisulu's elder brother Max, in his capacity as Speaker of the National Assembly, ruled that this remark was unparliamentary and she ultimately withdrew it. Maynier continued to pursue the issue over the next two years, maintaining that the expense of the chartered flights – now estimated at R11 million for 35 flights – was unjustifiable and "almost certainly" contrary to the ministerial code. In September 2014, he accused the Defence Ministry of obstructing investigations into the expenditure.

=== Public Service and Administration: 2012–2014 ===
In June 2012, Zuma announced a reshuffle in which Sisulu became Minister of Public Service and Administration; she succeeded Roy Padayachie, who had recently died. The Mail & Guardian reported that Sisulu was deeply upset about her transfer, which she perceived as a demotion. However, within her first year in office, she negotiated a multi-year wage agreement with public sector trade unions and launched a new anti-corruption program under an "anti-corruption bureau"; in the latter regard, Corruption Watch named her its "hero of the week" for "showing political will". Also during her first year, Sisulu made another controversial appointment, recruiting Menzi Simelane as a special adviser soon after the Constitutional Court questioned his integrity in a high-profile judgment.

As the ANC's 53rd National Conference approached, Sisulu was touted as a possible dark-horse candidate to challenge Zuma for the ANC presidency; she apparently had particular support from elements of the ANC Youth League. However, when the conference took place in December 2012 in Mangaung, Sisulu stood only for re-election to her fourth term as an ordinary member of the National Executive Committee. She was re-elected as the third-most popular candidate, behind only Nkosazana Dlamini-Zuma and Malusi Gigaba. At the same time, she was re-elected to her third term on the National Working Committee.

=== Human Settlements: 2014–2018 ===
Pursuant to the May 2014 general election, Zuma appointed Sisulu as Minister of Human Settlements in his second-term cabinet – the same (now renamed) Housing portfolio that she had formerly held under Mbeki. During just under four years in the position, she oversaw the establishment of both the Human Settlements Development Bank and the Human Settlements Ombudsman; though the department's performance in other areas was mixed, the Mail & Guardian concluded at the end of 2017 that she had "consistently proved to be a capable and hardworking minister".

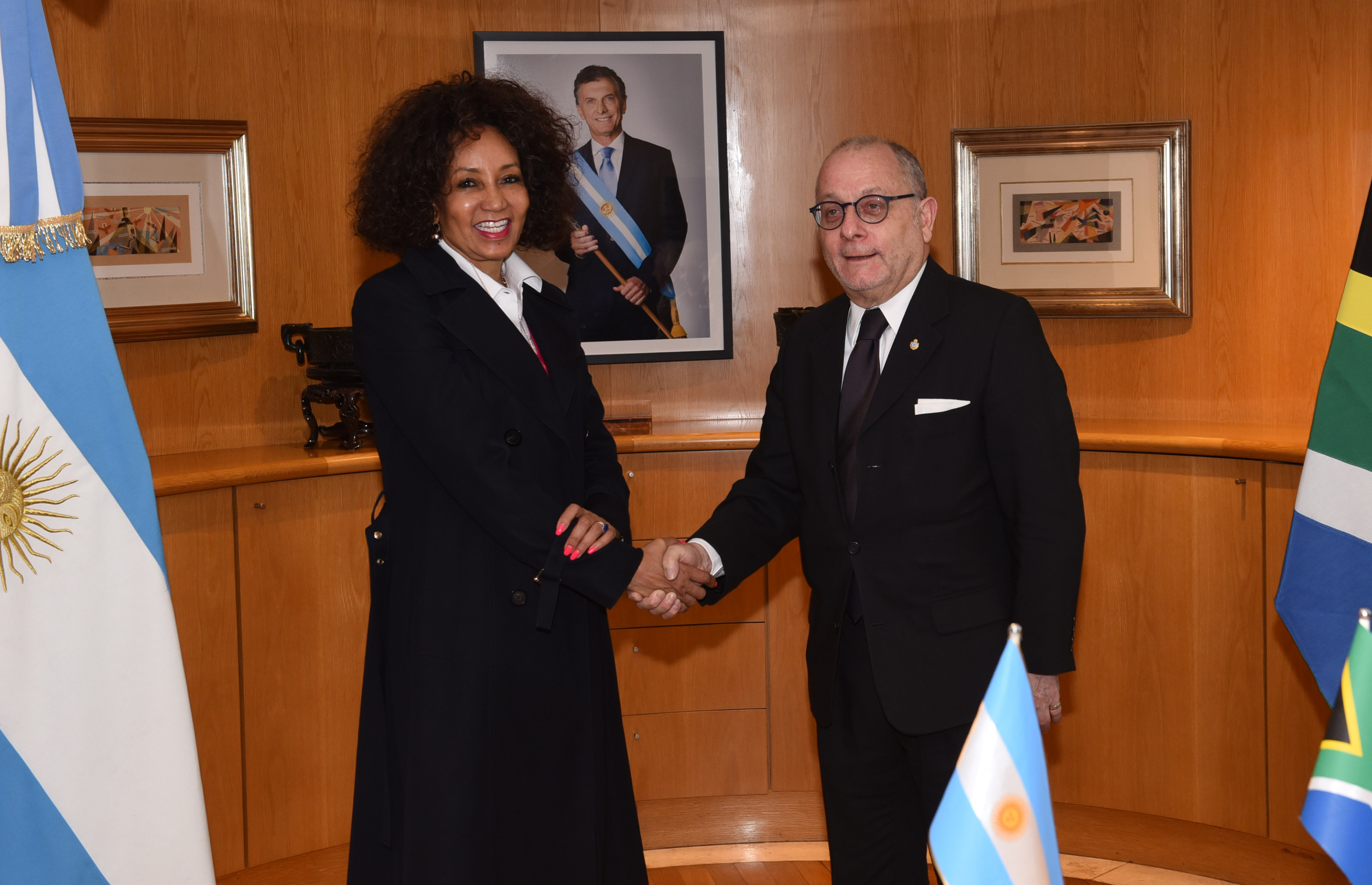
Sisulu with Argentinian Foreign Minister Jorge Faurie in May 2018

==== First presidential campaign ====
Ahead of the ANC's 54th National Conference in 2017, Sisulu launched a campaign to succeed Zuma as the party's president. She announced her candidacy on 21 July 2017 at Walter Sisulu Square in Kliptown, Soweto, where the Freedom Charter was adopted in 1955. She said that she intended to "cleanse the ANC and recover its original values". Her campaign slogan was, "It's a must," and her campaign emphasised reversing the legacies of apartheid and patriarchy. However, she was not a frontrunner in the race: though she was formally nominated to stand for the position by an ANC branch in the Eastern Cape, her family's home province, an internal poll taken in July suggested that she had the support of about seven per cent of ANC members. Her campaign ultimately cost over R1 million.

During the campaign, Sisulu was openly critical of Zuma's leadership and called for the ANC to subject him to disciplinary action. She also entered into a public spat with Gwede Mantashe, the ANC's secretary-general, as a result of an interview she gave the Dispatch in October 2017. In particular, the newspaper quoted her as having asked, "where was he when we were fighting for this freedom in exile and in jail, which he today is abusing for personal interests?". Because Mantashe had been a trade unionist inside South Africa during apartheid, this remark was viewed as disparaging to the internal anti-apartheid struggle (as opposed to that waged from exile), and critics said that it supported perceptions of Sisulu as "out of touch and arrogant". In response, Mantashe alluded to Sisulu's experience as a member of a "royal family", and ANC Chief Whip Jackson Mthembu mocked Sisulu as "politically immature" on Twitter.

When local ANC branches finished nominating candidates for the leadership positions, Sisulu did not emerge as a presidential candidate but was a popular candidate for the deputy presidency. Apparently in response to this, she announced on 14 December that she would drop out of the presidential race to stand as deputy president. She replaced Naledi Pandor as the running mate of Zuma's main challenger, national Deputy President Cyril Ramaphosa. The national conference began two days later at Nasrec, with the results of the leadership election announced on 18 December. Although Ramaphosa prevailed against Zuma, Sisulu was defeated for the ANC deputy presidency by the Zuma-aligned candidate, David Mabuza, who won 2,538 votes (54 per cent) against Sisulu's 2,159 (46 per cent). She was, however, re-elected to the National Executive Committee as the 12th-most popular candidate, and she returned to the National Working Committee as well.

=== International Relations and Cooperation: 2018–2019 ===
In the aftermath of the Nasrec conference, in February 2018, Ramaphosa replaced Zuma as national president. He appointed Sisulu to replace Maite Nkoana-Mashabane as Minister of International Relations and Cooperation in his new cabinet. Soon after her appointment, she commissioned a comprehensive review of South African foreign policy, which was led by Aziz Pahad. The Mail & Guardian commended her for "bringing a new energy" to the Department of International Relations and for being "an assured and charming representative of South Africa". In November 2018, human rights advocates criticised South Africa's decision to abstain from a Third Committee resolution which condemned the Rohingya genocide in Myanmar, but, soon afterwards, Sisulu announced that her department would reverse its position as part of a broader policy of taking a stronger stance on human rights issues. Indeed, South Africa supported the same resolution when it appeared before the United Nations General Assembly.

Sisulu was also in office when South Africa unilaterally downgraded its relations with Israel, replacing the South African Embassy in Tel Aviv with a liaison office. Sisulu announced this decision in a speech at the South African Institute of International Affairs in April 2019. The South African Jewish Board of Deputies was strongly opposed to the move; its vice-president, Zev Krengel, accused Sisulu of being "the single biggest enemy" of South Africa's Jewish population. Later, in an October 2022 interview with SABC, Sisulu complained that she had been "left dangling alone" to field public attacks and had expected President Ramaphosa to defend her publicly. However, her cabinet colleague Mondli Gungubele accused her of lying, saying that she had not expressed any discomfort at the time.

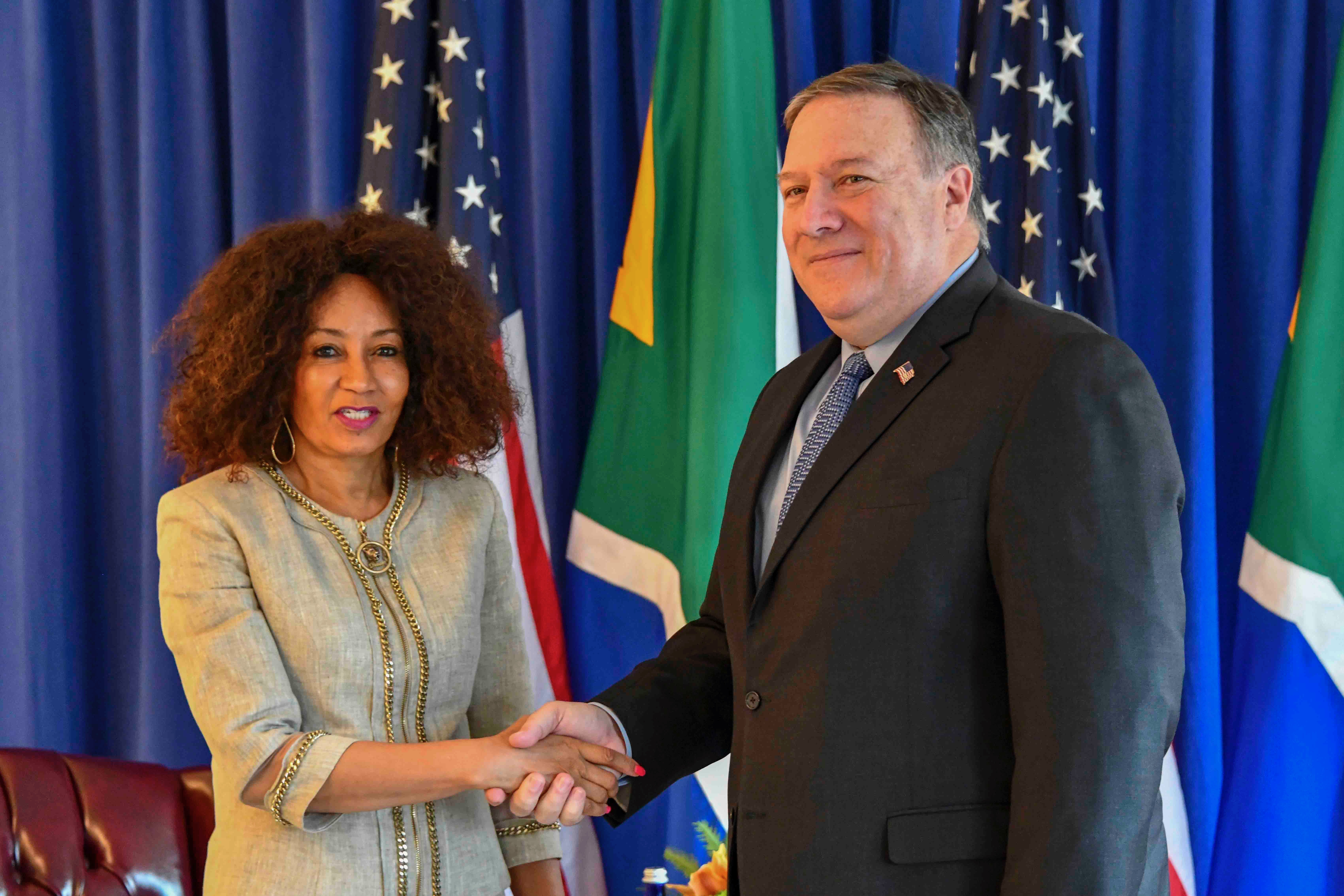
Sisulu with American Secretary of State Mike Pompeo during the United Nations General Assembly in September 2018

=== Human Settlements, Water and Sanitation: 2019–2021 ===
Pursuant to the May 2019 election, Ramaphosa restructured his cabinet, and Sisulu was appointed as Minister of Human Settlements, Water and Sanitation, in which capacity she oversaw the merger of the Department of Human Settlements and the Department of Water and Sanitation. In November 2019, she launched the National Water and Sanitation Master Plan, which would aim to upgrade water infrastructure at a cost of R898 billion over ten years. Critics described the policy as "a personal vanity project", and City Press reported that it faced opposition within the cabinet and ANC parliamentary caucus.

As in several of her previous offices, Sisulu was criticised for appointments she made in the portfolio. In November 2019, she appointed Bathabile Dlamini – who had recently been sacked from the cabinet – as the chairperson of the Social Housing Regulatory Authority's interim board. Another former minister, Susan Shabangu, was appointed to a ministerial advisory committee. In January 2020, the opposition DA called for the Public Service Commission to investigate Sisulu's appointment of two other ANC affiliates – Menzi Simelane and former spy Mo Shaik – as special advisers; Shaik resigned in the ensuing controversy. ANC donor Jurgen Kögl was also a special adviser to Sisulu; and another adviser, Mphumzi Mdekazi, was accused by the DA of inflating his travel expenses, as well as of being a dictatorial presence in the department. More seriously, the DA's Emma Powell alleged that Sisulu had made improper appointments to her department's new National Rapid Response Task Team, which Powell claimed was staffed mostly with Sisulu's political allies. This allegation led to an investigation by the Public Protector, who ultimately found, in September 2023, that Sisulu had indeed exceeded her authority in appointing the task team.

=== Tourism: 2021–2023 ===
Sisulu remained in the Human Settlements, Water and Sanitation Ministry for just over two years before Ramaphosa reversed the merger of those portfolios in an August 2021 reshuffle. In the same reshuffle, he appointed Sisulu to replace Mmamoloko Kubayi-Ngubane as Minister of Tourism. This was regarded as a substantial demotion for Sisulu. The most prominent initiative under her leadership was a R1-billion proposal for SA Tourism to sponsor Tottenham Hotspur; the proposal led to a clash between Sisulu and Parliament's Portfolio Committee on Tourism.

==== Second presidential campaign ====
By the time of the August 2021 reshuffle, Sisulu was believed to be preparing to challenge Ramaphosa for the ANC presidency at the party's next conference. In January 2022, in what was widely viewed as the inauguration of her campaign, she published an opinion piece on IOL entitled, "Hi Mzansi, have we seen justice?" The piece questioned the value to post-apartheid South Africa of constitutionalism and the rule of law, suggesting that these institutions neglected "African value systems" and concealed a lack of post-apartheid economic transformation. In a particularly controversial passage that some commentators described as an attack on the judiciary, she described some senior black judges as "mentally colonised".

The most dangerous African today is the mentally colonised African. And when you put them in leadership positions or as interpreters of the law, they are worse than your oppressor. They have no African or Pan African inspired ideological grounding. Some are confused by foreign belief systems. In America, these interpreters are called the House Negroes...
Today, in the high echelons of our judicial system are these mentally colonised Africans, who have settled with the worldview and mindset of those who have dispossessed their ancestors. They are only too happy to lick the spittle of those who falsely claim superiority. The lack of confidence that permeates their rulings against their own speaks very loudly, while others, secure in their agenda, clap behind closed doors.

— Sisulu's January 2022 article on IOL

The Acting Chief Justice, Raymond Zondo, held a rare press briefing to respond to and reject Sisulu's remarks, characterising them as an unsubstantiated "insult" to "all African judges". During the ensuing controversy, the Presidency said that Sisulu had been called to a meeting with President Ramaphosa at which she had been admonished and had agreed to retract her remarks about the judiciary. However, in what the Daily Maverick called "a show of unprecedented defiance from a Cabinet minister", Sisulu released her own statement disputing the Presidency's account and asserting that "I stand by what I penned". Some observers speculated that Sisulu was attempting to provoke Ramaphosa into sacking her from the cabinet so that she could instigate a backlash against him. In subsequent months, she continued to argue publicly for "reform" to the Constitution, and she argued that her original article had been misunderstood or deliberately misinterpreted.

Despite this early stir, Sisulu's presidential campaign did not receive sufficient support from local ANC branches to appear on the ballot paper. At the conclusion of nominations in November 2022, she was nominated by only 66 branches, as compared to Ramaphosa's 2,037 and Zweli Mkhize's 916. When the 55th National Conference began the following month, a delegate nominated her from the floor of the plenary to stand for the position of ANC treasurer-general; she accepted the nomination, but it failed to meet the requisite threshold of support from delegates. Thus Sisulu stood only as an ordinary candidate for re-election to the National Executive Committee, which she won comfortably; she was the 52nd-most popular candidate of the 80 ordinary members elected. She was not elected to return to the National Working Committee.

==== Departure ====
In his next cabinet reshuffle on 6 March 2023, Ramaphosa sacked Sisulu from the cabinet, appointing Patricia de Lille to replace her as Minister of Tourism. Sisulu announced soon afterwards that she would not serve as an ordinary Member of Parliament but would instead resign from the National Assembly. She left her seat on 15 March. She told the media that she looked forward to spending more time engaging in world politics.

== Personal life ==
Sisulu's first husband was South African economist Xolile Guma, whom she married in exile; they had their first child together out of wedlock in December 1975. After their divorce, she remarried to Rok Ajulu, a Kenyan academic, with whom she also had children, and who died of pancreatic cancer in December 2016. In 2022, Sisulu said that she had herself been treated for cancer.
