= Luyolo Mphithi =

South African politician (born 1992)

Luyolo Mphithi MP
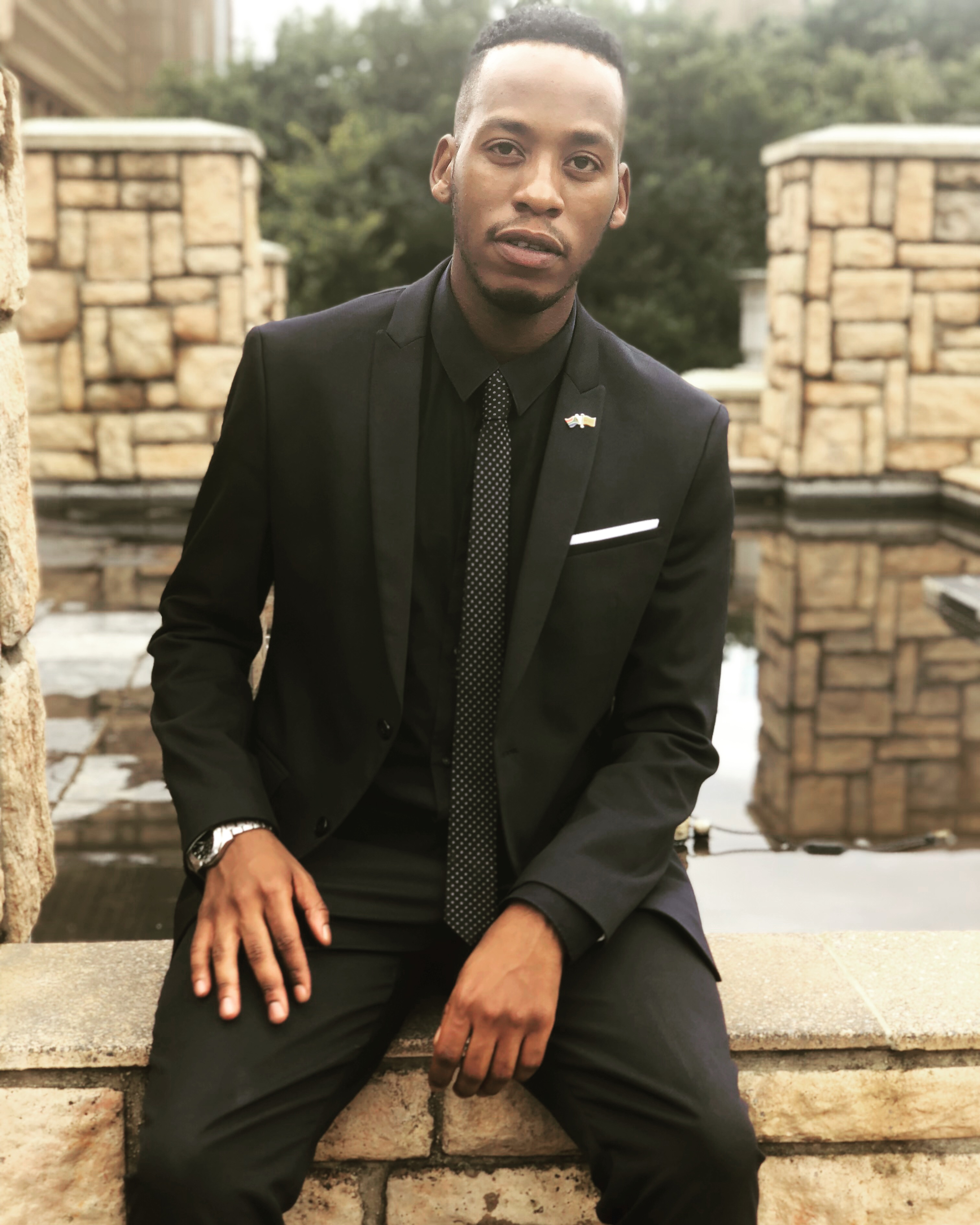
- Mphithi in 2018

Shadow Minister of Human Settlements
- In office 21 April 2023 – 14 June 2024
- Leader: John Steenhuisen
- Preceded by: Emma Powell
- Succeeded by: Position vacant

Shadow Minister of Women, Youth and Persons with Disabilities in the Presidency
- In office 5 June 2019 – 21 April 2023
- Deputy: Nazley Sharif
- Leader: Mmusi Maimane; John Steenhuisen
- Preceded by: Denise Robinson
- Succeeded by: Nazley Sharif

Federal Leader of the Democratic Alliance Youth
- In office 6 April 2018 – 4 April 2022
- Preceded by: Yusuf Cassim
- Succeeded by: Nicholas Nyati (interim)

Member of the National Assembly of South Africa
- Incumbent
- Assumed office 22 May 2019

Personal details
- Born: 1 September 1992 (age 34)
- Party: Democratic Alliance
- Education: University of Witwatersrand
- Occupation: Member of Parliament
- Profession: Politician

Luyolo Mphithi (born 1 September 1992) is a South African politician who has been a Member of the National Assembly of South Africa since 2019. A member of the Democratic Alliance, he served as Shadow Minister of Women, Youth and Persons with Disabilities in the Presidency from 2019 to 2023 and the Shadow Minister of Human Settlements from 2023 to 2024. Mphithi served as the Federal Leader of the DA's youth organisation from 2018 until his resignation in 2022. Luyolo Mphithi was elected as Vice President of the African Liberal Youth for democracy in Dakar, Senegal in 2022. He also serves as a Bureau Regional member of the International Federation of Liberal Youth (IFLRY).

== Early life and education ==
From the University of the Witwatersrand, Mphithi has a Bachelor of Arts degree in political science, international relations and law as well as a joint honour's degree in international relations and political science. He is currently pursuing his master's degree in Public Administration at the same university.

Additionally, Mphithi has a certificate in political formations and structures from the International Academy of Leadership (IAF) in Gummersbach, Germany. He also holds a certificate in research Methodology from Bowdoin College and a certificate in public management from Syracuse University in the United States.

== Career ==
Mphithi was employed by the Mpumalanga Provincial Legislature as a research and communication officer, responsible for researching the fields of cooperative governance and traditional affairs, human settlements, public works, roads and transport, as well as public safety, security and liaison.

He was also employed as a consultant at various institutions, such as the Executive Research Associates, the Hanns Seidel Foundation, the University of the Witwatersrand, and the Department of International Relations and Cooperation. Mphithi also served as the Director of Political Administration at the City of Johannesburg.

== Political career ==
Mphithi served as a Democratic Alliance councillor in the City of Johannesburg for the community of Meadowlands in Soweto. During his time on the city council, he was a member of the committees on public safety and environment, infrastructure and services. He also served as the director and head of department of political administration for the municipality.

Mphithi is a DA's Young Leaders Programme graduate and has held multiple roles in the DA. While a student at the University of Witwatersrand, he was head of the university's Democratic Alliance Student Organisation branch and was also the Gauteng DA Youth deputy chair in 2012. He serves as a member of the party's Federal Council for the Johannesburg region. Additionally, he serves as treasurer for the African Liberal Youth (ALY). He represented the organisation at the African Liberal Network's 2017 conference in Nairobi, Kenya.

At the DA's conference in April 2018, Mphithi was elected federal leader of the DA Youth, succeeding Yusuf Cassim.

Mphithi stood as a DA parliamentary candidate on the national list in the 2019 national elections, and was subsequently elected to the National Assembly and sworn in on 22 May 2019. On 5 June, Mphithi was appointed Shadow Minister of Women, Youth and Persons with Disabilities in the Presidency by DA leader, Mmusi Maimane, in his second shadow cabinet.

Maimane resigned as DA leader in October 2019 and John Steenhuisen was voted in as his interim successor in November. In May 2020, the DA announced that it would hold its Federal Congress to elect new leadership on 31 October to 1 November 2020. Mphithi was against the decision and later supported KwaZulu-Natal MPL Mbali Ntuli's bid for DA leader. Steenhuisen was elected leader for a full term in a landslide on 1 November. He announced his shadow cabinet in December 2020 and kept Mphithi as Shadow Minister of Women, Youth and Persons with Disabilities in the Presidency.

In January 2019, months before the May 2019 general election, Mphithi shared on Twitter a single photo of the Grade R classroom of the Schweizer-Reneke primary school following reports that the school had segregated children of different races. This was a photo that had been trending on social media and Mpithi was not the first to share it. The story regarding the segregated classroom had also been widely reported by the media. Mphithi re-shared the photo before establishing the true facts, and criticized the teacher Elana Barkhuizen for being a racist. Mphithi was accused of having "sowed racial division" in Schweizer-Reneke, as a result of re-sharing the photo and his comments on the teacher. The school later clarified that the widely shared belief that children were not separated due to race was not true. However, the North West MEC for Education, Sello Lehari, suspended the teacher, Elana Barkhuizen. Barkhuizen then approached the trade union Solidarity, and they approached the labour court, which overturned her suspension in February as unfounded.

Solidarity CEO Dirk Hermann wrote a letter to Maimane, in which he singled out and scapegoated Mphithi, and said he "sowed racial division" and that he should apologise to Barkhuizen and the children, whose identities he exposed. Mphithi refused to apologise and Maimane did not see reason to sanction him as he was not responsible for the narrative being spread both on social media and the media that the school racially segregated students. This response from the DA resulted in a claim that the party lost large amounts of Afrikaner votes at the May election due to Mphithi's actions. In November, DA Deputy Federal Chairperson, Refiloe Nt'sekhe, announced that the party would be investigating the incident. In March 2020, Nt'sekhe said that the report had been presented to the party's Federal Executive (FedEx) and that the FedEx had resolved to refer the report to the party's Federal Legal Commission to determine if disciplinary charges should be laid. The report exonerated Mphithi and found that the loss of Afrikaner votes was also due to poor communication and the party's campaign strategy, and not only Mphith's tweet. The party’s Federal Executive unanimously adopted the report exonerating Mphithi which named those responsible for the loss of the Afrikaner votes as the party's former CEO, Paul Boughey, the former Campaign Director, Jonathan Moakes, and Executive Director of Communications, Siviwe Gwarube, elected an MP after the 2019 election and appointed as the National Spokesperson of the party by the Leader of the DA, John Steenhuisen in November 2020.

On 4 April 2022, Mphithi resigned as the Federal Leader of the Democratic Alliance Youth to focus on serving the DA's Soweto constituency.

Mphithi was appointed Shadow Minister of Human Settlements on 21 April 2023. Nazley Sharif succeeded him as Shadow Minister of Women, Youth and Persons with Disabilities in the Presidency.

Mphithi was re-elected to the National Assembly at the 2024 general election. With the DA entering into a coalition government with the ANC, his term as a Shadow Minister came to an end.

== Awards and accolades ==
Mphithi was awarded the Ernest Oppenheimer Memorial Scholarship, the Mandela Rhodes Scholarship, Mellon-Mays Undergraduate Fellowship, as well as the Mandela Washington Fellowship of the Young African Leaders Initiative.

In 2017, he was cited by the Mail & Guardian as one of the "Top 200 Young South Africans" for his work in politics. In the same year, Avance Media ranked him as one of the 100 most influential young South Africans in politics.

Party political offices
Preceded by Yusuf Cassim	Federal Leader of the Democratic Alliance Youth; 2018–2022	Succeeded by Nicholas Nyati
Political offices
Preceded by Emma Powell	Shadow Minister of Human Settlements; 2013–present	Succeeded by Position vacant
Political offices
Preceded by Denise Robinson	Shadow Minister of Women, Youth and Persons with Disabilities in the Presidency; 2019–2023	Succeeded by Nazley Sharif
