= Reconstruction and Development Programme =

South African socio-economic policy framework

Reconstruction and Development Programme (RDP) was a South African socio-economic policy framework implemented by the African National Congress (ANC) government of Nelson Mandela in 1994 after months of discussions, consultations and negotiations between the ANC, its Alliance partners the Congress of South African Trade Unions and the South African Communist Party, and "mass organisations in the wider civil society".

The ANC's chief aim in developing and implementing the Reconstruction and Development Programme, was to address the immense socioeconomic problems brought about by apartheid. Specifically, it set its sights on alleviating poverty and addressing the massive shortfalls in social services across the country—something that the document acknowledged would rely upon a stronger macroeconomic environment.

Achieving poverty alleviation and a stronger economy were thus seen as deeply interrelated and mutually supporting objectives—development without growth would be financially unsustainable, while growth without development would fail to bring about the necessary structural transformation within South Africa's deeply inequitable and largely impoverished population.

Hence, the RDP attempted to combine measures to boost the economy such as contained fiscal spending, sustained or lowered taxes, reduction of government debt and trade liberalisation with socially minded social service provisions and infrastructural projects. In this way, the policy took on both socialist and neo-liberal elements—but could not be easily categorised wholly in either camp.

== Social achievements of the RDP ==
Proponents of the RDP argue that the programme oversaw many major advances in dealing with South Africa's most severe social problems:

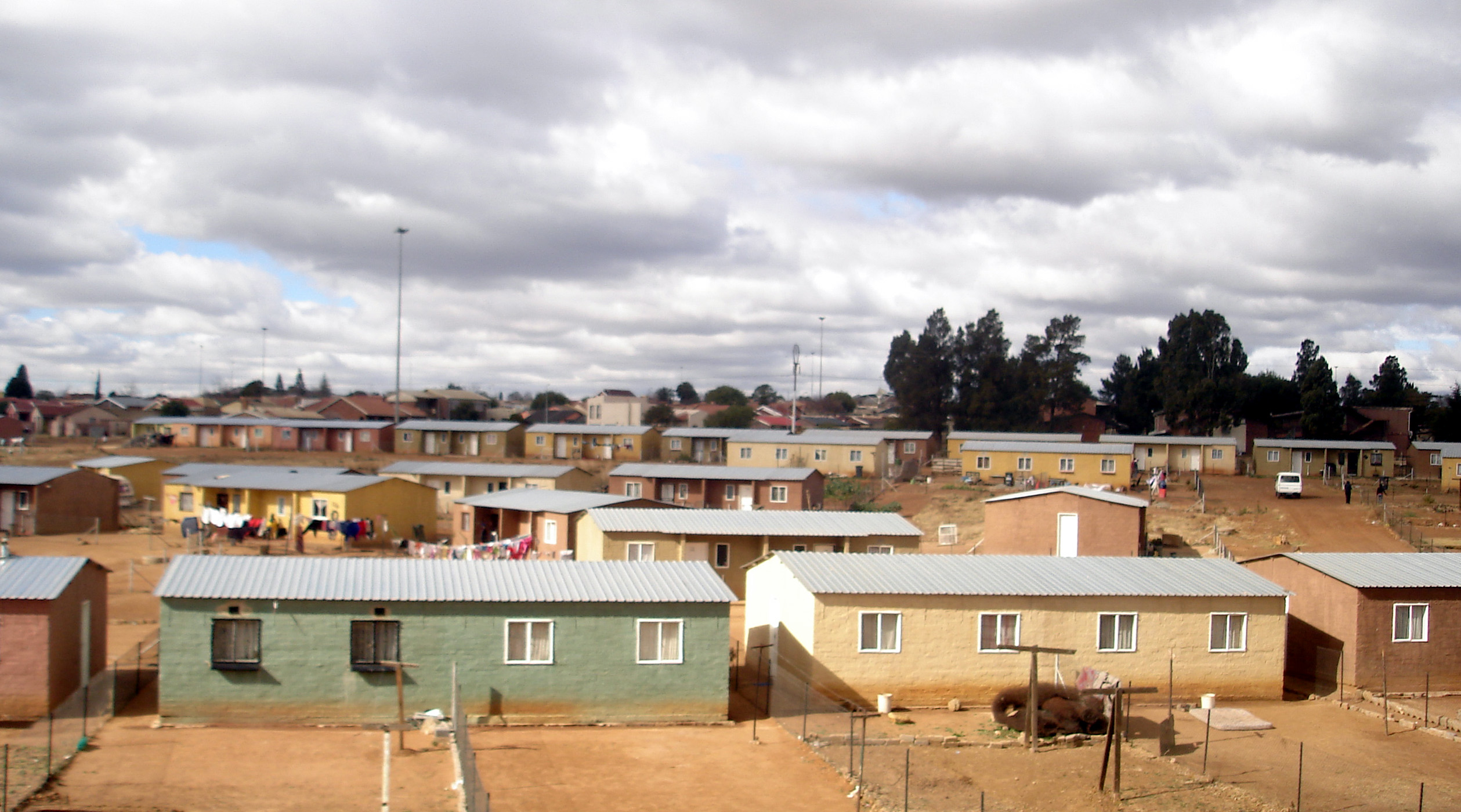
RDP Houses in Soweto

- Housing: Between 1994 and the start of 2001 over 1.1 million cheap houses eligible for government subsidies had been built, accommodating 5 million of the estimated 12.5 million South Africans without proper housing. In some instances, RDP housing delivery led to violent conflicts within communities.
- Clean water: By the beginning of 1998, standpipes had been installed within 200 metres of the dwellings of about 1.3 million rural people. By August of that year, Minister of Water Affairs Kader Asmal stated that since he had taken office more than 2.5 million people had been given access to fresh safe water. By 2000, a total of 236 projects had supplied clean piped water to nearly 4.9 million people—most of whom were inhabitants of former homelands.
- Electrification: Between 1994 and May 2000 around 1.75 million homes had been connected to the national grid, while the proportion of rural homes with electricity grew from 12% to 42%.
- Land reform: By 1999 some 39,000 families had been settled on 3,550 square kilometres of land. Authorities claimed that 250,000 people had 'received land' within four years.
- Healthcare: Between April 1994 and the end of 1998, around 500 new clinics gave an additional 5 million people access to primary health care facilities. Under the polio-hepatitis vaccination programme that began in 1998, 8 million children were immunised within two years.
- Public works: A community-based Public Works Programme provided employment over five years to 240,000 people on road-building schemes and the installation of sewage, sanitation facilities and water supplies.

== Criticism ==
Critics have questioned the scope of change represented by many of the statistics, and have argued that realities on the ground signify a far more modest improvement than the government claims. They have attacked, in particular, the standards of housing and water delivery, healthcare improvements and the success of land reform policy and agricultural reforms:

- Housing: Critics of the RDP point to poor housing quality as the chief problem being faced. One research investigation in 2000 found that only 30% of new houses complied with building regulations. Critics also note that new housing schemes are often dreary in their planning and layout—to the extent that they often strongly resemble the en masse bleak building programmes of the Apartheid government during the 1950s and 60s.
- Clean water: Critics of the RDP have targeted in particular the government's assertions regarding the provision of clean water—citing an array of problems and complications with RDP policies that have led to their partial or full failure during the implementation stage. Lodge notes that water projects faced, in many cases, severe design faults that led to unworkable bureaucratic messes on the ground. Subsequently, the percentage of households relying on rivers, streams and dams for their water actually increased slightly between 1995 and 1999 while the percentage of households using piped water only increased slightly. In 2000 the government announced a major change in policy by providing free basic allowances of 6,000 litres per month—solving the financial restrictions of the rural poor in accessing water, but placing even more doubt in the financial sustainability of the schemes.
- Land reform: The number of families settled on land under the RDP was way off the Programme's goal—the RDP had aimed to resettle families on 300,000 square kilometres of land—in reality only just over 1% of this goal was achieved. Moreover, the advances in many other areas of public services came partly through the removal of agricultural subsidies—which subsequently created huge job losses. Between 1994 and 1998 the number of workers on commercial farms declined from 1.4 million to just 637,000. Thus the number of people employed in the agricultural sector actually declined substantially under the RDP.
- Healthcare: Critics of the RDP argue that access to healthcare only improved slightly under the RDP and that, even with moderately improved access, standards at many medical institutions declined rapidly. They cite, in the first place, that usage of healthcare facilities increased by just 1.6% between 1995 and 1999, and that even these modest improvements have been eclipsed by the advance of the AIDS pandemic and other health epidemics such as malaria. Between 1995 and 1998 life expectancy of South Africans fell from 64.1 years to 53.2 years, with AIDS patients sometimes occupying up to 40% of beds in public hospitals. This, say critics, is indicative of a "public health system... in crisis" rather than one undergoing positive transformation. Equally troubling has been declining quality of services—Lodge notes, for example, that in Soweto 950,000 patients attended primary healthcare clinics in 1994 where they were seen by 800 nurses—but by 2000 the number of patients had spiralled to about 2,000,000 while the number of nurses had fallen to just 500.

== See also ==
- N2 Gateway housing project
- Accelerated and Shared Growth-South Africa (ASGISA)
- Homelessness in South Africa
- Department of Human Settlements
- Economy of South Africa
