= Stroller (disambiguation) =

A stroller is a form of baby transport.

Stroller or strollers may also refer to:

- Stroller (horse) (1950–1986), British champion show jumping horse
- Stroller (style), American term for a type of men's semi-formal wear; known in the U.K. as a black lounge suit
- Stroller, a term for street children in Cape Town, South Africa, living a bergie lifestyle
- Civil Service Strollers F.C., a senior non-league football team from Edinburgh, Scotland
- West Bromwich Strollers, a former name of West Bromwich Albion F.C.
