= Homelessness in South Africa =

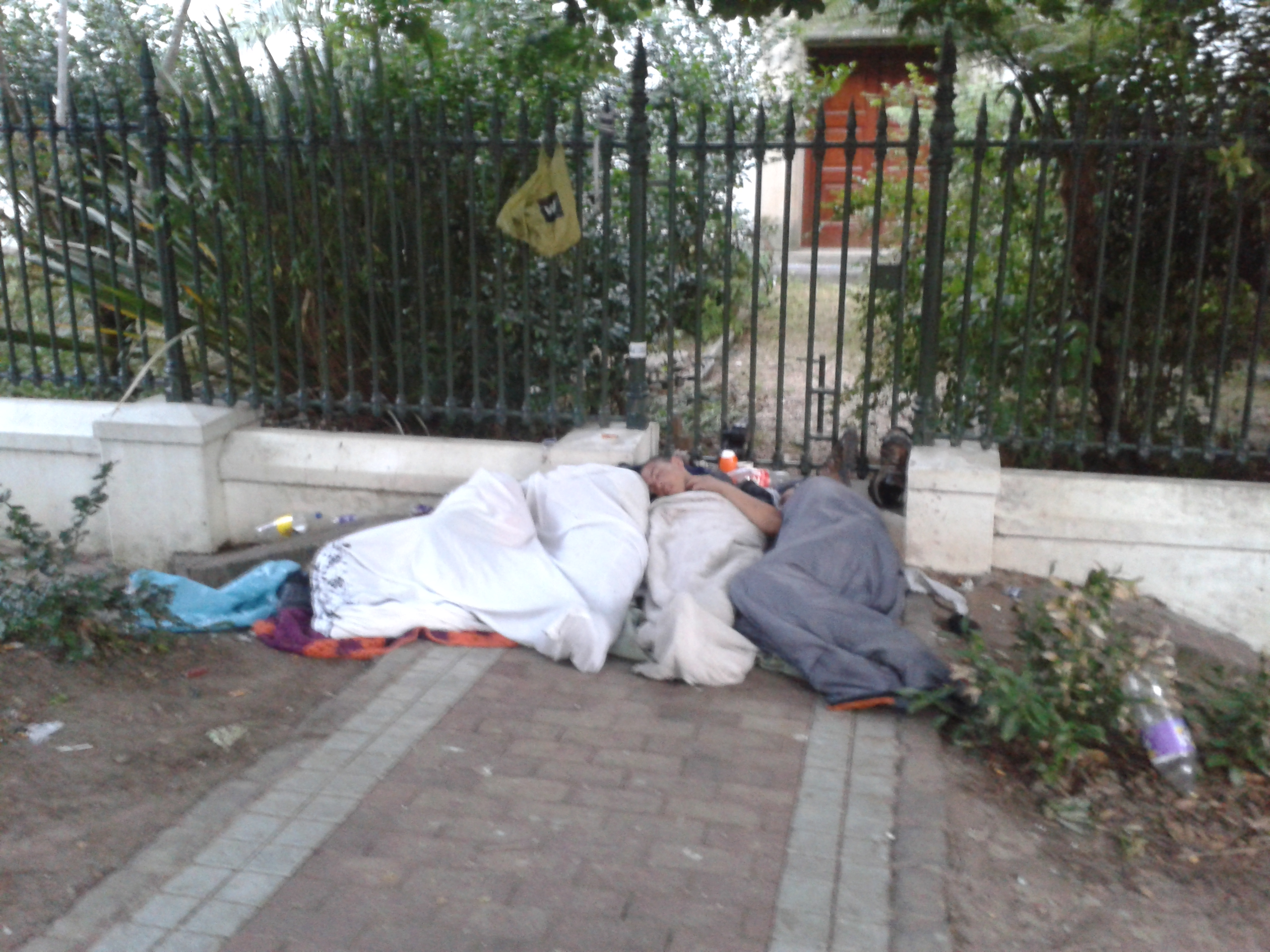
People sleeping in the Company's Garden, in Cape Town

Homelessness in South Africa dates back to the apartheid period. Increasing unemployment, lack of affordable housing, social disintegration, and social and economic policies have all been identified as contributing factors to the issue.

Some scholars argue that solutions to homelessness in South Africa lie more within the private sphere than in the legal and political spheres.

There is no national census on homeless people in South Africa; researchers instead rely on individual studies of homeless persons in particular cities.

In 2022, the South African homeless population was reported by Statistics South Africa (Stats SA) to comprise a total of 55,719 individuals.

One study found that three-quarters of South African metropolitan municipalities viewed homelessness primarily as a social dependency issue and responded with social interventions. At the same time, homeless South Africans indicated that the most important assistance the municipality could provide was employment and well-located, affordable housing.

== History ==
=== Early history through the 1800s ===
In the 19th century, the main issues facing the colonies were squatting and vagrancy, as white settlers took much of the land for farming. In the mid-19th century, under colonial rule, efforts were made to remove non-white people from white-owned property, causing the displacement of a large wandering population looking for work.

The introduction of Cape's Vagrancy and Squatting Act (1878) and other legislation enacted by the colonies were intended to change the status of vagrants or wanders living on the land from a status of vagrancy to residential labour, to prevent the crime risks associated with the wandering population.

=== Apartheid period ===
During the apartheid period, racial segregation and anti-black policies were used to preserve white rule of the country. Zoning laws controlled movement and places of residence for black people, forcing them into black townships in the white-ruled cities. Visible homelessness was not allowed on the streets, so those who were homeless due to apartheid policies moved into shack settlements.

The Natives Land Act 1913, known as the Black Land Act, legalised racial distinctions that denied rural black farmers access to land. Formed forced 'scheduled areas' that prevented the buying and selling of land to make any profit. It encouraged segregation, controlled movement, and spatially segregated residence within urban areas, and expanded throughout the apartheid.

From this piece of legislation, more policies and legislation of racial segregation were enacted, limiting areas for blacks to live, forcing them into townships. The Native Land Act was the first piece of legislation to enforce territorial segregation and was the beginning of racial segregation in institutionalising it into South African legislation.

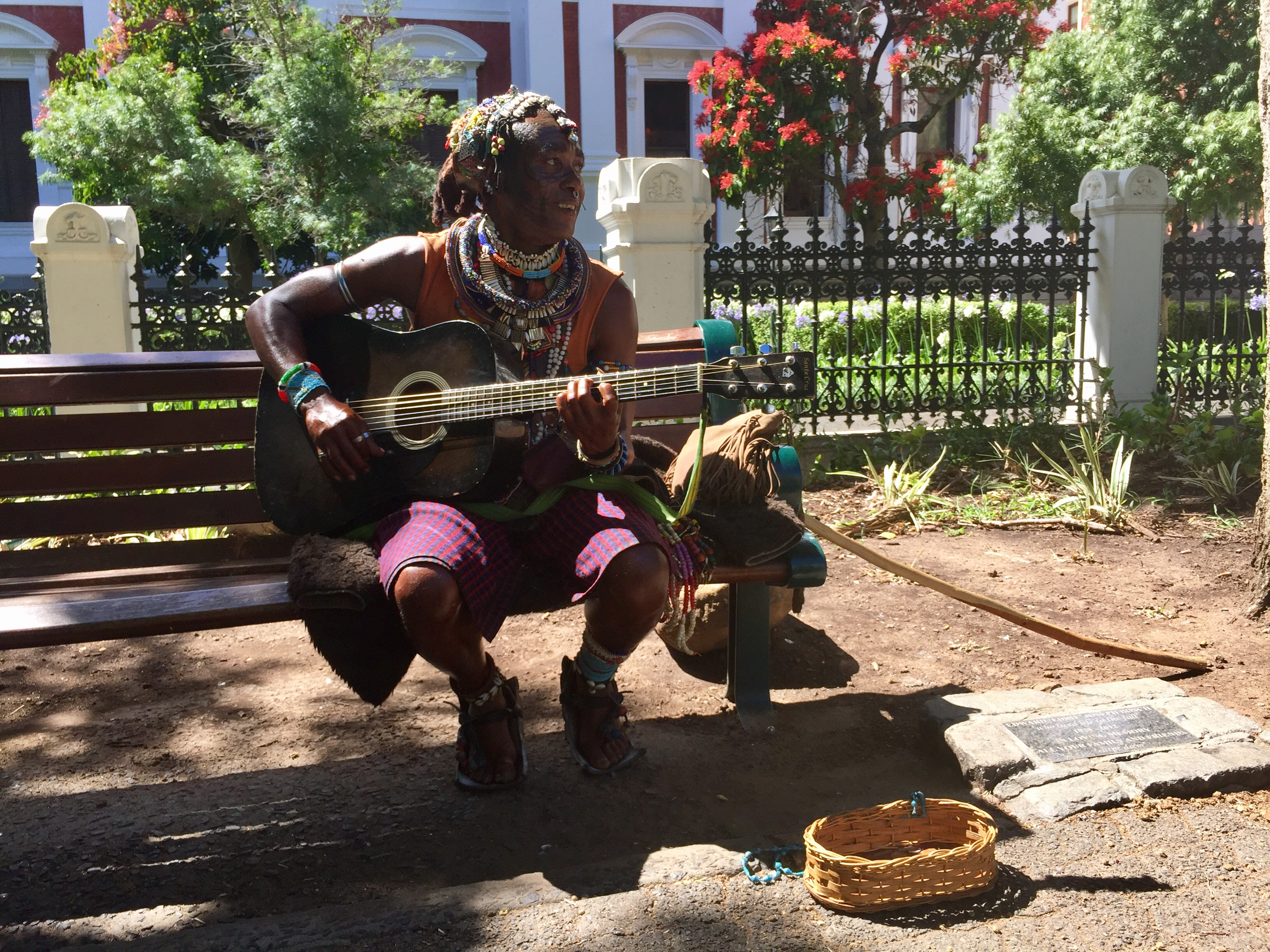
Homeless person trying to make a living through music in Cape Town, South Africa

In 1927, the first township, Langa, was founded in Cape Town. In the 1950s, the townships of Nyanga and Guglethu were developed and expanded.

Severe housing shortages in 1968 led to overcrowding, and people constructed informal, illegal settlements throughout the cities.

== Causes ==
Homelessness is shaped by social and economic insecurity, which is worsened by informal housing and a lack of legislation by the government. Financial pressure put on those living on the street is worsened as they cannot accumulate wealth, unlike the population living in shacks.

Unemployment is known to contribute to homelessness. South Africa has seen an improvement in its unemployment rate, with the national average dropping from 36.2% in 2014 to 31.9% in 2025.

The South African economy is growing; according to Statistics South Africa, it expanded by 0.6% in the fourth quarter of 2024. Growth was driven by agriculture, finance, and trade on the supply (production) side of the economy. Household spending led growth on the demand (expenditure) side.

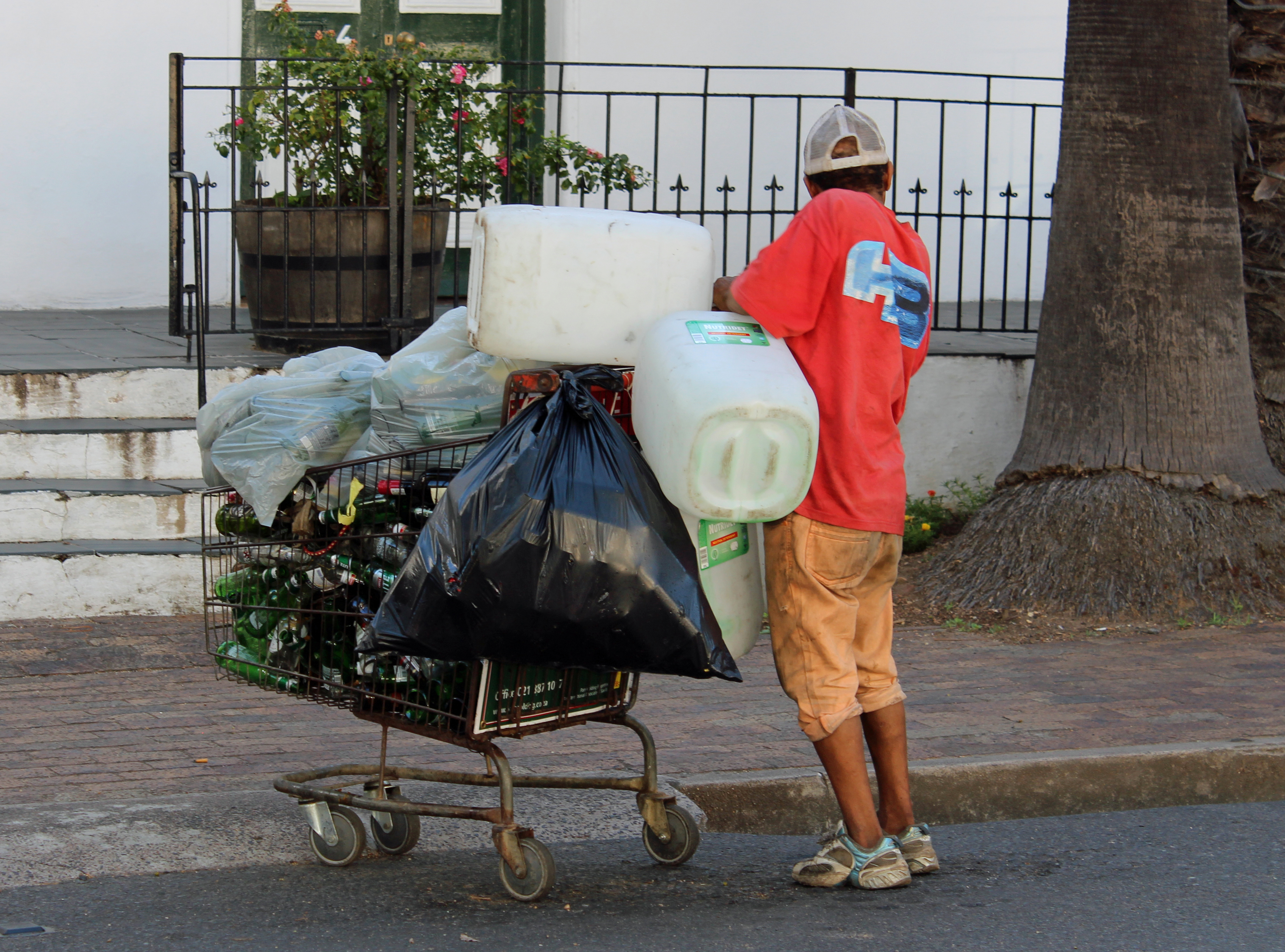
Homeless person collecting recyclables in Stellenbosch, South Africa

High rates of migration into urban areas, whereby the government is unable to cope with the influx. Post-apartheid, free movement of non-white South Africans into areas that were restricted to them, resulting in not enough employment opportunities available.

== Prevalence ==
=== Demographics ===
The 2022 national census found that there were 55,719 homeless people in the country and that the metropolitan municipality with the largest proportion of South Africa's homeless population was Tshwane with 18.1% of all homeless people.

Other municipalities with a significant share of the country's homeless population were The City of Johannesburg Metropolitan Municipality (15.6%), The City of Cape Town (11.9%), and eThekwini Metropolitan Municipality (10.1%). Gauteng province had the largest number of homeless people with 25,384 recorded individuals, and the Western Cape had the second largest homeless population with a total of 9,743 recorded individuals.

Share of South African Homeless Population Across Major South African Cities (2022 Census)
City	Percentage
City of Tshwane Metropolitan Municipality	18.1%
City of Johannesburg Metropolitan Municipality	15.6%
City of Cape Town	11.9%
eThekwini Metropolitan Municipality	10.1%

Those living on the streets are typically children or single adults, not families. The street homeless population is predominantly black and male. There is a higher prevalence of men on the street, while amongst those living in shacks, there is a larger female population. A profile of homeless people in Cape Town found that there were three times more males than females living in homeless shelters.

In 2004, rural areas had a higher proportion of homeless individuals than cities, whereby a larger percentage of the rural population was poorer than in metropolitan areas.

The 2022 census showed that there was far more homelessness in non-metro areas than in metro regions. The rate of homelessness in non-metro areas was 25.9% - multiple times higher than in many of South Africa's major metropolitan areas.

== Street Children ==
Significant migration of street children across borders into South Africa comes initially from other bordering countries such as Zimbabwe. This migration occurrence is an increasing situation facing homeless children.

A high percentage also comes from urban townships, compared with the higher rate of adults from rural areas. They are forced to leave as there are not enough resources to support them in poverty-stricken living spaces.

Street Children suffer physical and psychological abuse and often develop a substance use disorder.

=== Advocacy response ===
'Surfers, Not Street Children' is an advocacy group based in Durban, established to teach street children to surf to foster connectedness. It aims to help them with psychological issues caused by difficult childhoods.

== NGO initiatives ==
Numerous non-profits have addressed homelessness in South Africa through various methods.

In Cape Town, The Service Dining Rooms is an NGO that provides warm meals to the city's homeless population. In Cape Town CBD, the NGO operates a center that serves meals each weekday for R2. SDR, which relies entirely on public funding, owns the building in which it operates and has operated since 1935.

== National government initiatives ==
There is no specific governmental policy to protect people experiencing homelessness. A 2003 report found that there was no direct national housing plan for people who lived on the streets, but that policy fell predominantly under the Housing and Social Welfare sectors.

Public spending has been directed toward supporting shelters for people experiencing homelessness; however, it is only remedial and not a long-term solution.

In 1994, following the end of apartheid, the newly established Department of Housing aimed to provide 1 million public houses over the following five years. To help alleviate homelessness, the provision of shelter to transition into more permanent living space was implemented by the Department of Housing as a result of the 1994 White Paper on a New Housing and Policy Strategy for South Africa.

The social democratic ANC government of South Africa's first President, Nelson Mandela, implemented the Reconstruction and Development Programme (RDP), a socio-economic policy, which oversaw many significant advances in dealing with South Africa's most severe social problems, including those of inadequate and improper housing (created by the apartheid regime's urban apartheid system, including actions taken under the Group Areas Act.

Affordable housing in South Africa is driven by initiatives at the national, provincial, and local levels of government.

== Local government initiatives ==
=== Cape Town ===
Through its Rough Sleeper initiative, the City of Cape Town partners with local homeless shelters to provide safe beds for individuals in need. In mid-2025, it was reported that the initiative had helped 5,000 individuals leave the streets.

The program also offers aid to fight substance abuse issues, obtain ID documents and social grants, and provide meals and personal development planning. It is also centered around reuniting families. The City partners with shelters across the metro to provide these services.

== Social Welfare ==
South Africa has one of the most extensive social welfare systems among the world's developing countries. In 2019, an estimated 18 million people in South Africa received some form of social grant provided by the government.

== Literature ==
Child homelessness in South Africa has been portrayed in the novel Thirteen Cents by K. Sello Duiker.

Homelessness in South African cities has been portrayed in art in a controversial piece titled Birds in a Cornfield.

== See also ==
- Department of Human Settlements
- Social welfare programmes in South Africa
- Economy of South Africa
- Developing country
- Welfare spending
- Poverty in Africa
- Bergie
