= Emma Powell =

Member of Parliament of South Africa

Emma Louise Powell MP

Shadow Minister of International Relations and Cooperation
- In office 21 April 2023 – 14 June 2024
- Leader: John Steenhuisen
- Preceded by: Darren Bergman
- Succeeded by: Position vacant

Shadow Minister of Human Settlements
- In office 5 December 2020 – 21 April 2023
- Leader: John Steenhuisen
- Preceded by: Office reestablished
- Succeeded by: Luyolo Mphithi

Member of Parliament from Western Cape
- Incumbent
- Assumed office May 2019

Emma Louise Powell is a South African politician who has been a member of parliament (MP) for the Democratic Alliance (DA).

She was appointed as Shadow Deputy Minister of Human Settlements, Water and Sanitation in the shadow cabinet of Mmusi Maimane in June 2019.

In December 2020, she was appointed as Shadow Minister of Human Settlements by John Steenhuisen.

Powell was promoted to the role of Shadow Minister of International Relations and Cooperation during a shadow cabinet reshuffle on 21 April 2023.

Powell was re-elected as a member of parliament in the 2024 general election. The DA entered national government through a coalition with the ANC which saw Powell leave office as Shadow Minister.

In 2025, she went on a trip to Israel despite the ongoing genocide case being brought by South Africa at the International Court of Justice.

Powell resigned from her position as in August 2025.
