= Affordable housing in South Africa =

Affordable housing in South Africa refers to housing that is considered economically accessible for individuals and families whose household income falls at or below specific ranges, as evaluated by either national or local government authorities. The term is used in various ways depending on the region and level of government, but generally refers to housing catering to low to moderate income households.

At the national level, affordable housing is available to households earning within a certain income range. As of 2025, this is between R1,850 and R22,000 per month. This equates to a range from around half the national median salary, to just below the national average salary.

Metropolitan municipalities (the country's largest cities) have their own ways of using the term. For example, in Cape Town, affordable housing is defined as residences catering to households earning an income of below R32,000 per month, which is slightly above the national average salary. For context, as of 2025, the national median salary is R5,400, and the national average salary is R29,290.

In the context of new builds (a key part of tackling a lack of affordable housing), affordable housing may refer to units priced a certain percentage below average market rates for similar homes. South Africa has a robust state-funded housing system that provides a mix of subsidized housing (free homes for low income earners), social housing (reduced cost rentals for low income earners), and other programs. The country has affordable housing programs driven by initiatives at the national, provincial, and local government levels.

== Statistics ==
According to the 2022 Census, conducted by Stats SA, South Africa has a population of 62 million people living in 17.8 million households. The country's average household size has continued to decrease, with the national average being 3.5 persons per household in 2022.

The number of households living in formal dwellings has increased from 65.1% in 1996 to 88.5% in 2022, while the percentage of households living in informal dwellings has halved, from 16.2% in 1996 to 8.1% in 2022. Nationally, nearly a third (30%) of households live in government-subsidized housing.

Between 1994 and 2022, the human settlements sector has delivered over 3.4 million stand-alone houses and multi-story units. Provinces and municipalities have further provided almost 1.3 million homes.

The Department of Human Settlements (DHS) has an annual budget of R33 billion, and builds around 30,000 affordable homes a year.

== Locations for cheaper housing ==
Gqeberha is cited as an ideal city for more affordable housing options, with property priced at an average of R1.1 million, as of 2019. Cape Town, in contrast, is South Africa's most expensive city for housing (both to purchase and to rent). According to Lightstone data, 31.1% of SA's affordable housing market is situated in Gauteng, while 13% is in the Western Cape, and 12% is in KwaZulu-Natal.

Buying a home in South Africa is still cheaper long-term than renting. Historically, many buyers have sought out homes close to major economic hubs, within cities (such as Cape Town CBD and Sandton. This was necessary due to proximity to offices, with traffic being determined by distance to the workplace. Fortunately, in recent years, across South Africa, more affordable housing located in less developed areas has become far more viable thanks to the proliferation of fully-remote work. This has also benefitted businesses in that they don't need to maintain the cost of having offices.

== 100% home loans ==
A 100% home loan is an option available to first-time buyers. It removes the requirement normally in place for a deposit (down payment), which is a significant barrier to entry for first-time home buyers with low incomes.

While not a formal program, competition between major financial institutions has resulted in an increasing number of 100% home loans being granted in recent years. Determining factors for approval include credit score and salary (ability to pay back the loan). A minimum credit score of 610 is required for approval of a 100% home loan, and a score of 661+ is considered good.

South Africa uses a mix of credit bureaus, who each maintain scores according to their own internal rating systems. Bureaus include Experian and TransUnion.

== National government initiatives ==
In 1994, after the end of apartheid, the then-new Department of Housing aimed to provide a million public houses over proceeding five years.

The social democratic ANC government of South Africa's first President, Nelson Mandela, implemented the Reconstruction and Development Programme (RDP), a socio-economic policy, which oversaw many major advances in dealing with South Africa's most severe social problems, including those of inadequate and improper housing (created by the apartheid regime's urban apartheid system, including actions taken under the Group Areas Act.

=== Subsidized Housing ===
Subsidized Housing is a program that enables a beneficiary to acquire a house that is built and provided by the government, through a government subsidy. These homes are now called BNG houses, but they are still commonly referred to as "RDP Houses".

The term should not be confused with other programs, where a contribution (subsidy) is provided for low income earners to purchase their first home, such as the FHFSA. The Subsidized Housing program provides free (100% subsidized) houses to those who qualify.

The South African government still provides free homes under its Subsidized Housing program. In order to qualify, an individual should:

- Be a South African citizen
- Be contractually capable
- Habitually cohabit with a partner, be married, be single and have financial dependents, or be a single military veterans without financial dependents
- Earn less than R3500.01 per month, per household
- Be a first time government subsidy recipient
- Be a first time home owner

Applicants can take IDs, birth certificates, and proof of income (if they work) to their Provincial Department of Human Settlements or their Local Municipality, and submit an application for a subsidized house.

The waiting period is usually 2 years, and housing development generally takes place within a planned and prioritized process, where the local conditions dictate which areas should receive assistance first.

These government houses are illegal to sell within the first 8 years of residency. The only exception within this period is when a beneficiary sells the property to the relevant Provincial Department of Human Settlements. This type of voluntary sale occurs when a beneficiary, for whatever reason, chooses not keep the subsidy house.

When their new home is complete, the beneficiary will be registered on the government housing database. When they receive their house, they sign a "Happy Letter". They receive their Title Deeds after 8 years. The entire process is free.

=== Social Housing ===
Social Housing in South Africa refers to reduced cost rentals provided to low income earners.

Through the mandate given to the Social Housing Regulatory Authority (SHRA), an agency of the Department of Human Settlements, affordable rental housing is provided in strategic areas. The SHRA also enables municipalities to deliver social housing, and regulates the social housing sector.

=== FHFSA ===
The First Home Finance & Subsidy Assistance (FHFSA) program, formerly known as FLISP, is a program facilitated by the Department of Human Settlements and the National Housing Finance Corporation (NHFC) that subsidizes houses for first-time home buyers earning between R3,501 and R22,000 per month. In other words, this program is available to those earning in a range beginning at just above the cut-off to qualify for the national government's Subsidized Housing (free homes) program.

As of October 2025, First Home Finance (FHF) subsidies range from R38,911 to R169,265, depending on a person's income. The FHFSA website maintains a subsidy calculator for prospective applicants. The subsidy can be paid into a home loan, or used as a deposit. Banks are more likely to grant home loans to low-income buyers bolstered by the FHFSA program.

== Provincial government initiatives ==
The Western Cape, where Cape Town is the capital, is the only province in South Africa to have published Inclusionary Housing Policy Framework to facilitate affordable housing in high-valued areas within its municipalities. The draft framework was published in 2021, and opened for public comment. It was aimed at assisting with housing for households earning up to R22,000 per month - below the national average income.

Municipalities, with the guidance of the province where needed, are expected to perform a Housing Market Study to determine whether people in their jurisdiction can afford to live there, and what the housing gap is - the difference between what an average household can afford, and the average price of a house. Municipalities define certain areas as appropriate for inclusionary housing.

After this, municipalities develop inclusionary housing policies to prescribe how big a development must be before it requires inclusionary housing, and the proportion of such housing required in the development. Developers are expected to include some units at lower-than-market rates, or support the city's broader inclusionary housing financially.

In essence, inclusionary housing policy compels large residential developments in well-located (desirable) areas to include sub-market-rate units, either for sale or for rent. Developers are able to make one of three choices to satisfy the requirement:

- Include a satisfactory percentage of below-market units within the actual development
- Build the amount of housing in a separate development, on other desirable land in the area
- Make in lieu payments to the municipality, which then ringfences the funds for other inclusionary housing. In lieu rates may be set higher than in kind rates, to deter developers from choosing this option.

Inclusionary housing can be sold or rented, as per the developer's preference. Rentals should be within the affordability threshold, and tenants are be subject to income checks. Sales should remain below-market over the long term, and should not be resold on the open market.

=== Incentives ===
Beyond mandating developers to include affordable housing, the municipalities provide them with various incentives for doing so. These include additional land use rights, such as being able to build more densely or include mixed-use units. Other incentives include reduced planning or parking requirements.

=== Cape Town context ===
As of 2026, Cape Town's gap households comprise 73% of the population, but only 18% of residential properties are in the gap housing segment, which relates to homes priced under R600,000. While salaries in Cape Town are generally higher than in other metros, the average home price in the city in 2026 was approximately R2.5 million.

== Local government initiatives ==
=== Cape Town ===
Cape Town, the capital of the Western Cape province, has and continues to build more affordable housing units than any other South African metro, by a significant margin. This, despite Cape Town not being the largest city in South Africa by population. During the period 1994 through 2025, the City of Cape Town constructed a total of 202,070 affordable housing units.

In February 2026, it was reported that during the preceding five years, Cape Town had handed over a total of 12,401 affordable houses (equating to 2,480 per year). This was more affordable homes than the next two largest metros combined, and 152% more affordable homes than Johannesburg (a significantly larger city by population) handed over during the same period.

==== Affordable housing development ====
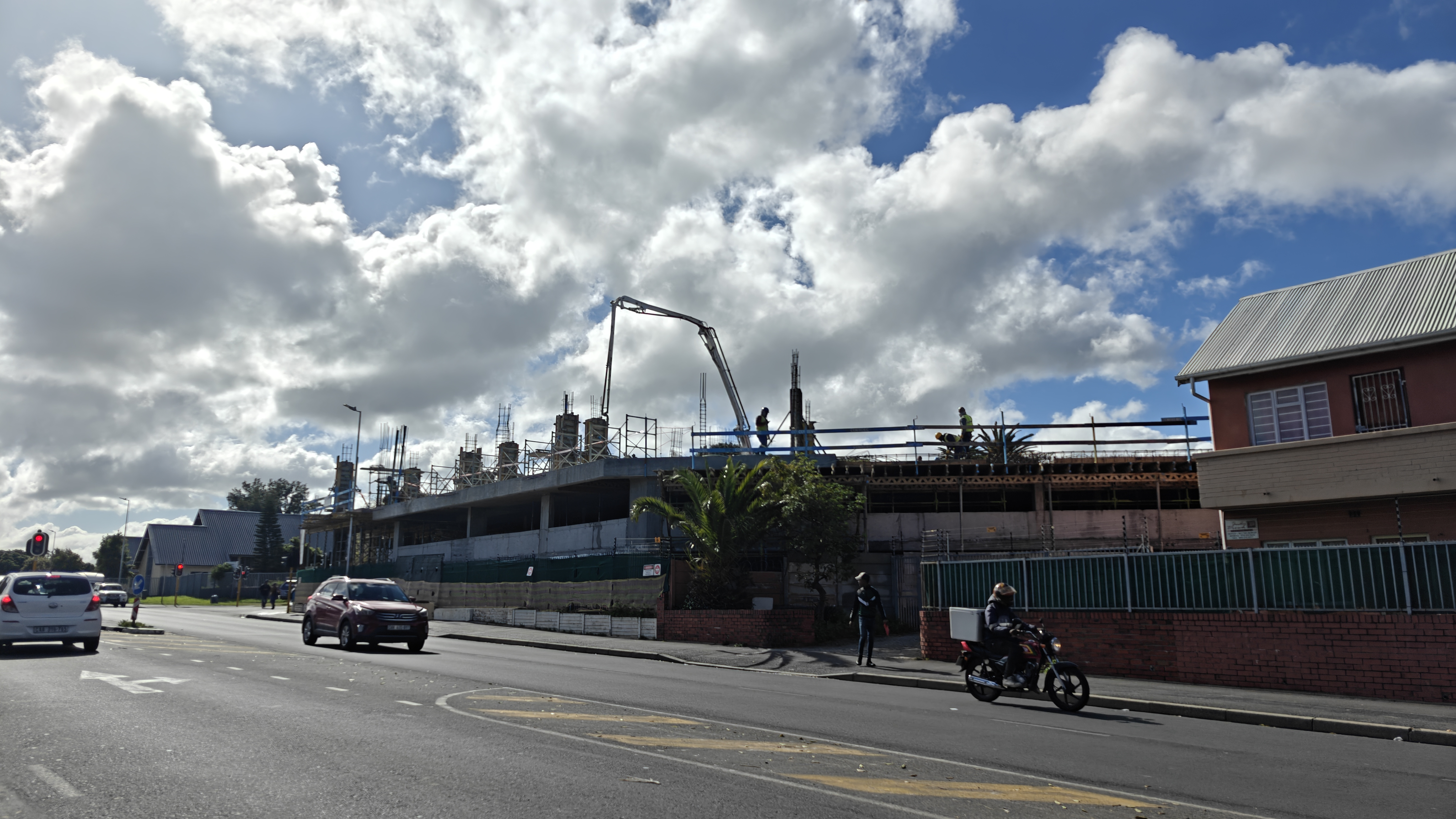
Affordable housing development in Tokai, Cape Town

Cape Town defines affordable housing as residences catering to households earning an income of below R32,000 per month. The city has 3 categories of affordable housing:

- Social housing. The City sells land to developers, who receive a once-off subsidy from the Social Housing Regulatory Authority (SHRA) - a nationally-funded government agency - to build apartments. After completion, the developers rent the homes to households (mainly families) that earn less than R22,000 a month. Rent is charged to recoup development costs, and to cover maintenance and security. By law, rentals can't cost more than R7,326 a month as of July 2025.
- Open market affordable housing. The City sells land to private developers, who build homes for households earning less than R32,000 a month.
- Gap housing. This is state-subsidized housing, funded by the national and provincial governments. Once built, the houses are made available for purchase to households earning less than R22,000.

As of 2025, a total of 10 social housing estates have been built across Cape Town, with 3 of them located within 10 kilometers of Cape Town CBD. All affordable housing built as of 2025 has been social housing, with gap housing and Open market affordable housing planned by the City.

In recent years, Cape Town and the Western Cape province have embarked on a number of affordable housing developments. These include:

- 23 Lower Long Street (418 units), in Cape Town CBD
- Maitland Mews (204 units), in the mixed-use suburb of Maitland, a few minutes from Cape Town CBD
- Conradie Park (3,600 units), in the residential suburb of Pinelands, also close to the CBD
- Belhar CBD (4,000 social rental units), in Belhar, close to numerous educational institutions
- Gugulethu Infill Housing Project (1,004 units), in Gugulethu and Nyanga
- Bothasig Gardens (434 units), in the northern suburb of Bothasig
- Goodwood Station (1,000 units), in the mixed-use area of Goodwood, close to the CBD
- Kent Street (237 units), in Cape Town CBD, on the border of District Six
- Salt River Market (970 units), in the suburb of Salt River, near the CBD

Future developments in Cape Town are planned. The City of Cape Town has released key parcels of land in Woodstock, Salt River, and Maitland, which, being close to the CBD, are prime real estate locations. Their yield is over 4,000 units. In December 2024, the City also approved a public participation process to release prime municipal property in Green Point for mixed-use development, including affordable housing, at 1 Three Anchor Bay Road, close to the V&A Waterfront.

These developments aim to create a more equitable living environment in Cape Town, and the Western Cape Province. Cape Town has South Africa's highest average household income, its highest property value growth rates, and its lowest levels of unemployment. Cape Town's City Council is awaiting the release of national government-controlled land within the city's borders, which would unlock the development of around 100,000 units of affordable housing.

In July 2025, Western Cape MEC for Infrastructure, Tertuis Simmers, and Western Cape Premier, Alan Winde, unveiled Cape Town CBD's largest ever government housing development project, called Founders Garden. The project will feature a high-rise, mixed-use development, and has a projected value of more than R2 billion. Located next to the Artscape Theatre - a prime location for being close to Cape Town CBD jobs and amenities - it will deliver 1,476 social housing units and 1,162 open market units, for a total of over 2,630 new homes.

In October 2025, the City announced it was going ahead with a social housing development in Rondebosch East, at the corner of Kromboom Road and 7th Avenue. Certain residents in the suburb protested the development, stating it would increase traffic, and change the character of the neighborhood. However, when the City held a public participation process, only 26 comments were received, and the City decided to proceed with the project. The land on which the housing will be developed is worth approximately R155 million, and the projected yield will be up to 800 homes.

In January 2026, the City unveiled an ambitious plan to bolster affordable housing through the release of four new tenders, collectively valued at R125.6 million. Aimed at enticing private sector developers, the tenders were strategically positioned on prime land in four low-to-mid income neighborhoods - Brackenfell, Ottery, Kraaifontein, and Lansdowne.

The developments form part of the City’s pioneering affordable housing program, which prioritizes public-private partnerships to facilitate greater access to affordable housing. The program focuses on well-located parcels of land, which have easy access to public transit and amenities. In doing so, the City aims to meet its housing delivery objectives as well as stimulate local investment and economic regeneration. The City set a tender submission deadline for prospective developers of 17 March 2026.

The tenders are for a residential security estate on Enslin Road in Ottery (375 units), a security estate in Lansdowne (308 units), a development on Eaon Way in Kraaifontein (396 units), and a development in Brackenfell (115 units). Thus, a total of 1,194 units will be built as part of the project. As part of the announcement, the City's MayCo Member for Human Settlements, Councillor Carl Pophaim, confirmed that the City had a development pipeline of over 12,000 affordable residential units.

== Other related organisations ==
There are many organisations working together to facilitate access to affordable housing for South Africans. Among those not mentioned earlier in this article are:

- The National Association of Social Housing Organisations (NASHO), an independent, member-based association comprising social housing landlords, social housing institutions, delivery agents, and municipal-owned entities, among others. NASHO conducts research and advocacy in the sector.
- The Housing Development Agency (HDA), a national public sector development agency that acquires and prepares land, develops land, and project manages the development of human settlements.
- The National Housing Finance Corporation (NHFC), a state-owned entity that supports housing delivery via the provision of affordable housing finance. It does so through various programs.

Outside SA, the Centre for Affordable Housing Finance in Africa (CAHF) publishes research on the South African affordable housing sector.

== See also ==
- Housing in South Africa
- Stats SA
- Department of Human Settlements
- Social welfare programmes in South Africa
- Economy of South Africa
- Housing Affordability in Anglophone Countries
- Welfare spending
- FHFSA home subsidy program
- The Social Housing Act, No 16 of 2008
- The Centre for Affordable Housing Finance in Africa
