= Bergie =

Subsection of homeless people in Cape Town, South Africa

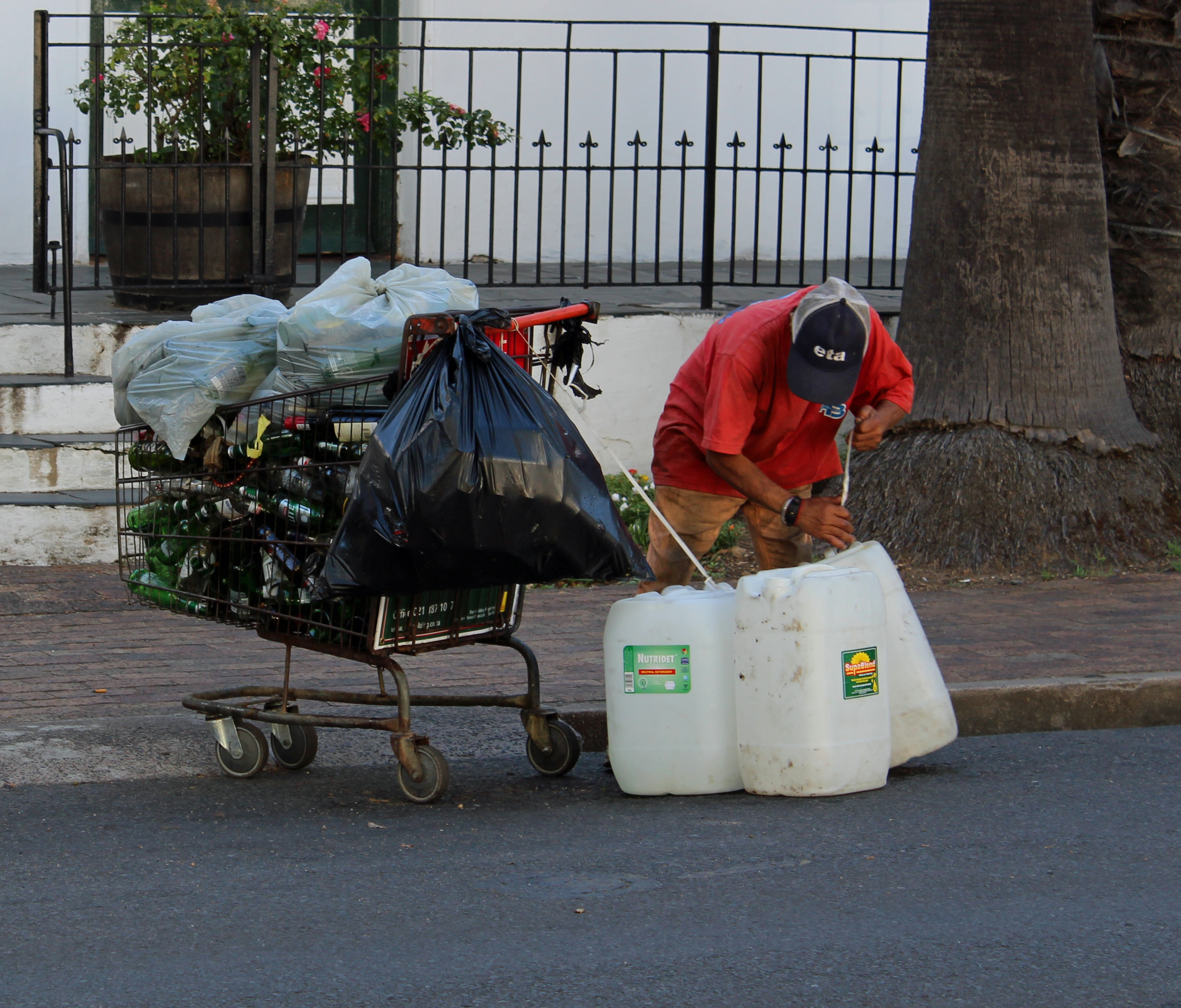
Bergie collecting recyclables in Stellenbosch

Pronunciation of "Bergie".

Bergie is a term used for a subsection of homeless people in Cape Town, South Africa. The word originates from the Afrikaans berg meaning "mountain" – the term originally referred to the homeless people who sheltered in the forests of the slopes of Table Mountain. The synonymous term stroller typically refers to street children living a bergie lifestyle.

They are vagrants and scavengers, sometimes begging, performing odd jobs or working as informal car guards for tips. Most of them are Cape Coloureds who speak Afrikaans mixed with a few English terms, and are known for their sense of humour, vulgar language and alcohol consumption.

Their lifestyle is portrayed in the 1987 novel The Strollers by Lesley Beake, the 1998 documentary film Pavement Aristocrats: The Bergies of Cape Town by François Verster, and the play Suip!, a black comedy co-written and directed by Heinrich Reisenhofer. Bergie, a short film by Dian Weys, depicts how a law enforcement officer removes people that are homeless in order to make way for a 10 km fun-run.

== See also ==
- Homelessness in South Africa
- Hobo
- Tramp
