= Connie September =

South African politician

- Born: 26 June 1959 (age 67); Cape Town, South Africa
- Education: Da Vinci Institute
- Occupations: Trade unionist, politician

Deputy Secretary-General of the ANC Veterans' League
- Incumbent
- Assumed office July 2023
- President: Snuki Zikalala
- Preceded by: Evelyn Lubidla

Minister of Human Settlements
- In office 10 July 2013 – 25 May 2014
- President: Jacob Zuma
- Preceded by: Tokyo Sexwale
- Succeeded by: Lindiwe Sisulu

Personal details
- Party: African National Congress
- Cabinet: Cabinet of South Africa

Cornelia Carol "Connie" September (born 26 June 1959 in Cape Town) is a South African former trade unionist and politician. She served as Minister of Human Settlements from July 2013 to May 2014 under President Jacob Zuma, and in July 2023, she was elected Deputy Secretary-General of the African National Congress (ANC) Veterans' League. Currently, September occupies the position of Chairperson for the CCMA.

== Early life and activism ==
September was born in Cape Town and spent parts of her childhood on the Western Cape coast. She began her working life in a clothing factory in Salt River. In 1982, she became involved in political activism through community forums associated with the Grassroots newspaper. These experiences led her into the civic and labour movement in the Cape.

== Political career ==
September entered Parliament in 1999 and served in various leadership positions, including Chief Whip of the ANC and chairperson of several parliamentary committees, such as those on Water Affairs and Forestry, and later on Higher Education and Training.

In July 2013, she was appointed as Minister of Human Settlements following a Cabinet reshuffle. During her brief term, she emphasised the need to transform the housing sector and address discrimination in housing delivery. She was succeeded by Lindiwe Sisulu in May 2014.

== Education ==
At age 61, in May 2022, September was awarded a PhD in Technology and Innovation in Education from the Da Vinci Institute. Her doctoral research focused on measuring the social return on investment in South Africa's public college system, highlighting the impact of public funding on student success.

== Trade Union Leadership ==
September became active in the South African Clothing and Textile Workers' Union (SACTWU), where she served as national treasurer and Western Cape vice-chair. In 1993, she made history by becoming the first woman elected as Deputy President of the Congress of South African Trade Unions (COSATU), a major umbrella labour organisation in the country.

== September Commission ==
In 1997, she chaired a major COSATU initiative known as the September Commission, named after her. This commission explored the future of trade unions in South Africa, considering the political and economic changes in the post-apartheid era. Its report outlined key challenges and proposed strategies to ensure unions remained relevant and effective. The commission's findings continue to influence COSATU's strategic planning to this day.

== Role in the ANC Veterans' League ==
In July 2023, during the ANC Veterans' League's third national conference held in Boksburg, she was elected as Deputy Secretary-General of the league. Her election marked her continued involvement in ANC leadership, especially among veteran members of the party.

Political offices
Preceded by Tokyo Sexwale	Minister of Human Settlements; 2013 – 2014	Succeeded by Lindiwe Sisulu
Trade union offices
Preceded by Chris Dlamini	Second Deputy President of the Congress of South African Trade Unions; 1993–1998	Succeeded by Peter Malepe
Preceded by George Nkadimeng	First Deputy President of the Congress of South African Trade Unions; 1998–1999	Succeeded by Peter Malepe
