= Walter Sisulu Square =

Coordinates: 26°16′39″S 27°53′20″E

Walter Sisulu Square of Dedication
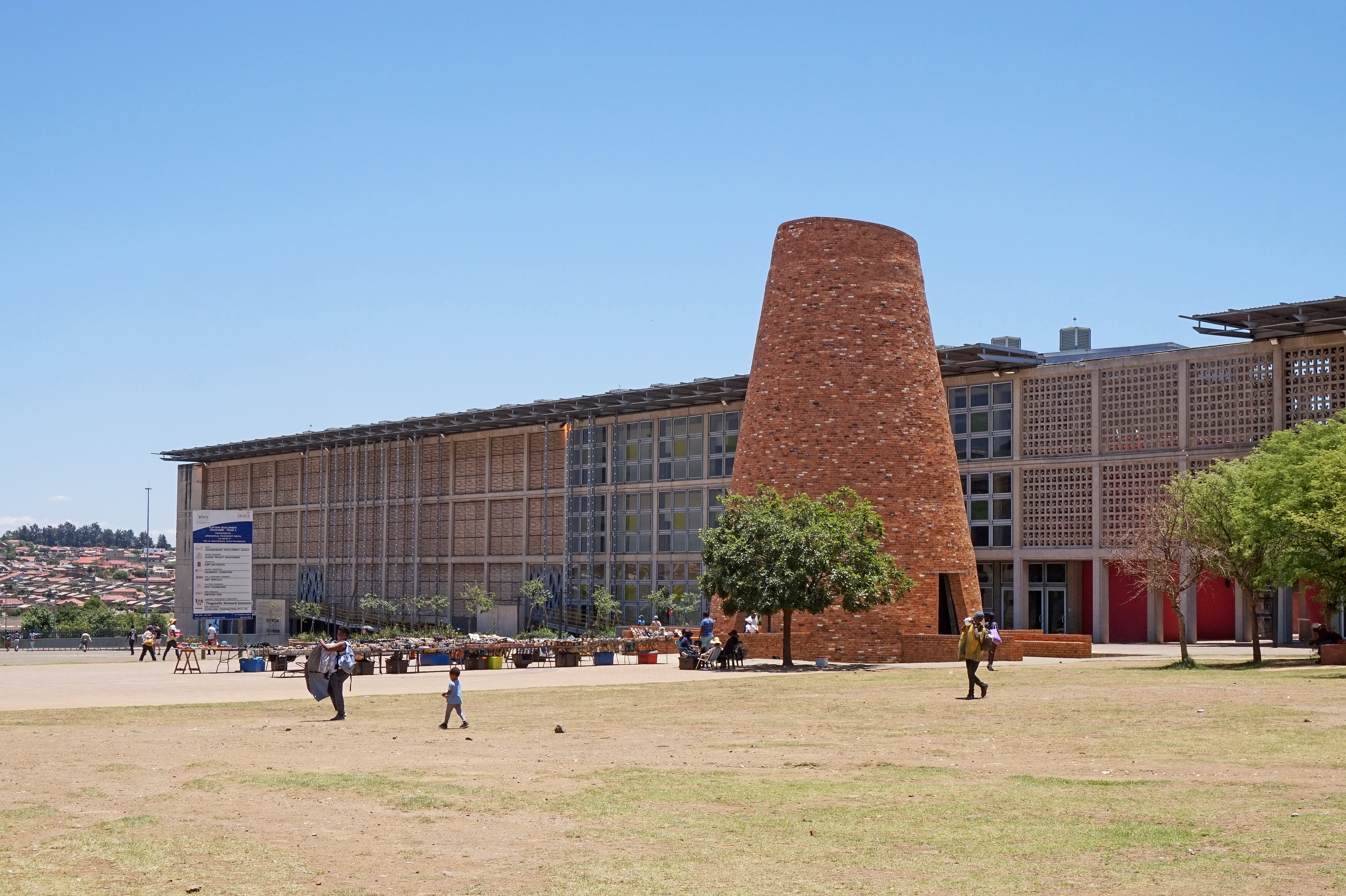
- Interactive map of the Walter Sisulu Square of Dedication area

General information
- Status: Completed
- Type: Monument
- Location: Kliptown, Soweto

Design and construction
- Architect: studioMAS

UNESCO World Heritage Site
- Official name: Human Rights, Liberation and Reconciliation: Nelson Mandela Legacy Sites
- Designated: 2024 (46th session)
- Reference no.: 1676

Walter Sisulu Square, formally known as the Walter Sisulu Square of Dedication, is located in the heart of Kliptown in Soweto, South Africa.

This location was the site where, on 26 June 1955, the Congress of the People, met to draw up the Freedom Charter, an alternative vision to the repressive policies of the apartheid state. The document emphasised a non-racial society, liberty and individual rights. The Freedom Charter remains the cornerstone of African National Congress policy and is seen by many as the foundation of South Africa's 1996 constitution.

The square has now been declared as a national heritage site. In June 2005, former President Thabo Mbeki lit a flame of freedom in Kliptown to mark the 50th anniversary of the Freedom Charter. It is named after Walter Max Ulyate Sisulu, a political activist during the apartheid era who was a member of African National Congress and served as Secretary-General and Deputy President of the organisation. He was released from prison in 1989.

The square's features include an open-air museum that explains how the Freedom Charter was written as a collaborative effort by thousands of South Africans of all races. The conical brick tower at the centre of the square is a monument to the document itself and contains the full principles of the Charter engraved in bronze.

In 2024 the Walter Sisulu Square became a World Heritage Site, as one of the Nelson Mandela Legacy Sites.
