= Minister of Human Settlements =

South Africa Minister of Human Settlements
- Flag of South Africa
- Incumbent; Thembi Simelane since 3 December 2024
- Department of Human Settlements
- Style: The Honourable
- Appointer: President of South Africa
- Term length: None
- Deputy: Tandi Mahambehlala
- Salary: R2,211,937
- Website: www.dhs.gov.za

The Minister of Human Settlements is the housing minister in the Cabinet of South Africa. The role has responsibility for the Department of Human Settlements. It has been held by Thembi Simelane, a member of the ANC, since December 2024.

== History ==
The position was known as the Minister of Housing until May 2009.

Between May 2019 and August 2021, the Department of Human Settlements was conjoined to the Department of Water and Sanitation under the Minister of Human Settlements, Water and Sanitation, a position held by Lindiwe Sisulu.

The merger was reversed when President Cyril Ramaphosa restored responsibility for water and sanitation to an independent Minister of Water and Sanitation in his second cabinet.

== List of ministers ==
List of ministers responsible for housing, 1994–present
| Portfolio | Name | Term | | Party |
|---|---|---|---|---|
| Housing | Joe Slovo | 1994 | 1995 | ANC |
| Housing | Sankie Mthembi-Mahanyele | 1995 | 2003 | ANC |
| Housing | Brigitte Mabandla | 2003 | 2004 | ANC |
| Housing | Lindiwe Sisulu | 2004 | 2009 | ANC |
| Human Settlements | Tokyo Sexwale | 2009 | 2013 | ANC |
| Human Settlements | Connie September | 2013 | 2014 | ANC |
| Human Settlements | Lindiwe Sisulu | 2014 | 2018 | ANC |
| Human Settlements | Nomaindia Mfeketo | 2018 | 2019 | ANC |
| Human Settlements, Water and Sanitation | Lindiwe Sisulu | 2019 | 2021 | ANC |
| Human Settlements | Mmamoloko Kubayi | 2021 | 2024 | ANC |
| Human Settlements | Thembi Simelane | 2024 | Incumbent | ANC |

== See also ==
- Homelessness in South Africa
- Reconstruction and Development Programme
