= Nomaindiya Mfeketo =

South African politician

Nomaindia Mfeketo
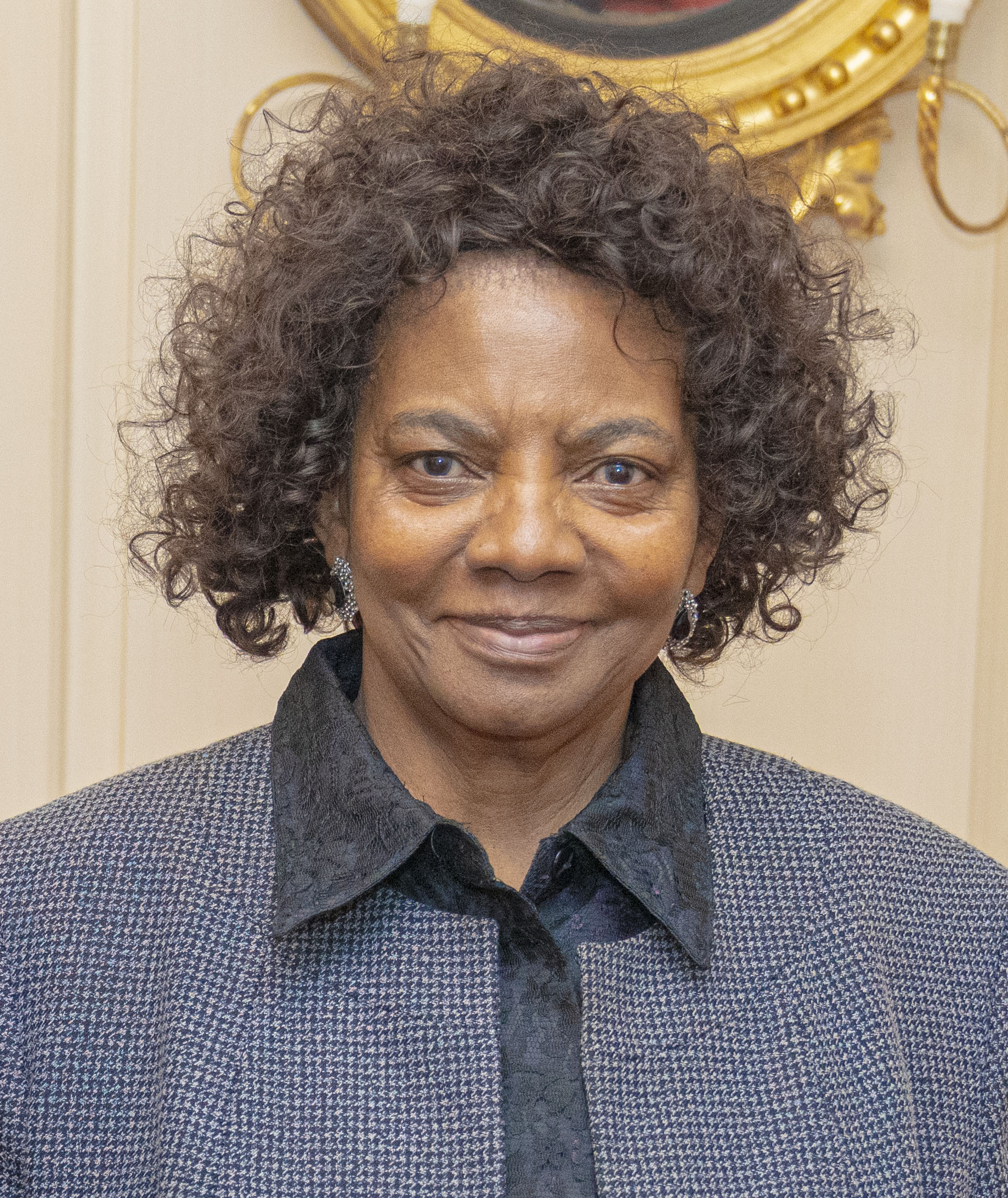

South African Ambassador to the United States
- In office March 2020 – August 2023
- President: Cyril Ramaphosa
- Preceded by: M. J. Mahlangu
- Succeeded by: Ndumiso Ntshinga

Mayor of Cape Town
- In office 1998–2000
- Preceded by: Gerald Morkel
- Succeeded by: Peter Marais
- In office 2002–2006
- Preceded by: Gerald Morkel
- Succeeded by: Helen Zille

Minister of Human Settlements
- In office 2018–2019
- Preceded by: Lindiwe Sisulu
- Succeeded by: Lindiwe Sisulu

Personal details
- Born: 2 June 1952 (age 73)
- Party: African National Congress

Nomaindiya Mfeketo is a South African politician who served as South African Ambassador to the United States from 2020 to 2023, Minister of Human Settlements from 2018 to 2019, Deputy Minister of International Relations and Cooperation, Deputy Speaker of the National Assembly of South Africa from 2009 to 2014, and mayor of Cape Town from 1998 to 2000 and again from 2002 to 2006.

== Early career ==
Prior to entering politics Mfeketo worked for a number of non-governmental organisations (NGO). From 1981 to 1991 Mfeketo worked for the agricultural training NGO ZAKH after which she worked for the Social Change Assistance Trust (SCAT) from 1991 to 1992. From 1992 to 1994, Mfeketo worked for the Development Action Group (DAG) on a public housing project.

== Political career ==
In 1993, she became involved in negotiations to combine state and non-state activities in preparation for South Africa's transition to multiracial democracy. Following Mfeketo's work with DAG she was elected Chairperson of the first democratically elected City Council in Cape Town for the 1996 – 1998 pre–interim phase.

=== Mayorship ===
She became the fourth woman and the first black woman to be mayor of the city when she held the post of Mayor briefly in 1998. She was re-elected mayor following the floor-crossing period which gave her party, the African National Congress (ANC), the majority in the city council in 2002, ousting Gerald Morkel of the Democratic Alliance (DA). She held the post until the DA regained control of the council in 2006, after which Helen Zille took office. Mfeketo left office amidst accusations of overspending.

=== Parliament ===
In 2007, Mfeketo was elected to the ANC's National Executive Committee. On May 6, 2009, Mfeketo was elected as Deputy Speaker of the National Assembly. Mfeketo served in this position until May 21, 2014, when she was succeeded by former Minister of Co-Operative Governance, Lechesa Tsenoli.

In 2009 the DA alleged that Mfeketo received a custom built 'mansion' worth R8 million as part of a controversial government housing plan for ministers in Cape Town and Pretoria even though she owned a private residence 9 km away.

=== Ambassadorship ===
Mfeketo was appointed Ambassador to the United States in 2020. She was Ambassador during a period of souring of relations between the US and South Africa due to accusations by the US that South Africa sold weapons to Russia.

== See also ==
- South African-United States relations

Political offices
Preceded by Gerald Morkel	Mayor of Cape Town; 2002–2006	Succeeded by Helen Zille
Preceded by Nozizwe Madlala-Routledge	Deputy Speaker of the National Assembly; 2009–2014	Succeeded by Solomon Lechesa Tsenoli
