= Department of Human Settlements =

South African government department

- List: 10 other official names: Departement van Menslike Nedersettings (Afrikaans); umNyango wezokuHlaliswa kwaBantu (Southern Ndebele); iSebe lezokuHlaliswa koLuntu (Xhosa); uMnyango Wezokuhlaliswa Kwabantu (Zulu); Litiko Letekuhlaliswa Kwebantfu (Swazi); Kgoro ya Madulo a Batho (Northern Sotho); Lefapha la Bodulo ba Batho (Sotho); Lefapha la Manno a Batho (Tswana); Ndzawulo ya Vutshamo bya Vanhu (Tsonga); Muhasho wa Madzulo a Vhathu (Venda)

Department overview
- Type: Department
- Jurisdiction: Government of South Africa
- Headquarters: Govan Mbeki House, 240 Walker Street, Sunnyside, Pretoria, Gauteng, South Africa; 25°45′29″S 28°12′09″E
- Employees: 527 (2022/2023)
- Annual budget: R 26.97 billion (2026/27)
- Minister responsible: Thembi Simelane, Minister of Human Settlements
- Deputy Ministers responsible: Pam Tshwete, Deputy Minister of Human Settlements; Tandi Mahambehlala; Deputy Minister of Human Settlements
- Department executive: Thabane Zulu, Director-General: Human Settlements
- Child agencies: Servcon Housing Solutions; Thubelisha Homes; National Home Builders Registration Council; National Housing Finance Corporation; National Urban Reconstruction and Housing Agency; Rural Housing Loan Fund; Social Housing Foundation; Housing Development Agency; Social Housing Regulatory Authority
- Key documents: Housing Act, 1997; Rental Housing Act, 1998; Social Housing Act, 2008
- Website: www.dhs.gov.za

The Department of Human Settlements (formerly the Department of Housing, and often referred to as DHS) is the department under the Ministry of Human Settlements of the South African government, responsible for matters relating to housing and urban development.

Its primary purpose is the implementation of the constitutional mandate that "everyone has the right to have access to adequate housing." It works in co-operation with the provincial governments, each of which has its own Human Settlements department, and with the municipalities.

As of 2025, the Minister of Human Settlements is Mmamoloko Kubayi-Ngubane, the Deputy Minister is Pamela Tshwete.

== Budget ==
The department had a budget for the 2024/2025 fiscal year of R33.6 billion/ 96% or R31.6 billion of that budget was allocated towards transfer payments. Transfer payments consist of conditional grant allocations (R30.1 billion), transfers to entities amounting to R1.5 billion, and other transfers that make up about R10 million. The Emergency Housing Fund budget of R496.7 million constitutes 1% of the total budget.

R4.5 billion was allocated to the Informal Settlement Upgrading Partnership Grant, and R8.7 billion to the Urban Settlements Development Grant for South Africa's metropolitan areas. R13.7 billion was allocated to the country's provinces for the Human Settlements Development Grant. The Informal Settlements Upgrading Partnership Grant was allocated R3.3 billion, to ensure the fast-tracking of the delivery of sustainable Human Settlements.
