= Disability in South Africa =

South Africans with disabilities constitute a sizeable proportion of the population, and their status in society is extremely varied in a developing nation with socio-economic inequality and a history of apartheid. Wealthy city dwellers have access to a wide range of assistance, whereas the poor struggle for even the basic necessities of life.

== Demographics ==
According to a 2014 report by Statistics South Africa, based on the 2011 census, 7.5% of the country's population is regarded as having a disability. (Note: From the Executive Summary on page V: "The report also does not include statistics on children under the age of five or on persons with psychosocial and certain neurological disabilities due to data limitations, and should therefore not be used for purposes of describing the overall disability prevalence or profile of persons with disabilities in South Africa.") The highest proportion of people living with disabilities, by province, was found to be in the Free State, with 11,1% of its population having a disability, followed by the Northern Cape, with 11%, the North West, with 10%, the Eastern Cape, with 9,6%, KwaZulu-Natal, with 8,4%, Mpumalanga, with 7%, Limpopo, with 6%, the Western Cape, with 5,4% and Gauteng, with 5,3%. In his presentation the Statistician-General, Pali Lehohla, said that mining could contribute to the high prevalence of people with disabilities in Free State, Northern Cape, North West, and Eastern Cape. According to Lehohla a significant number of South Africa's mine workers originate from these provinces.

== Legislation and government policy ==
South Africa is a party to the United Nations Convention on the Rights of Persons with Disabilities (CRPD) as well as the Optional Protocol to the Convention on the Rights of Persons with Disabilities, signed on 30 March 2007 and ratified on 30 November 2007. The national constitution's chapter two, "bill of rights" explicitly prohibits unfair discrimination against people on the basis of disability or health status.

The 1997 Integrated National Disability Strategy (INDS) white paper set out a variety of government policy positions on disability.

From 2009 to 2014 a Ministry and Department of Women, Children and Persons with Disabilities existed. Its disability programme was criticized in parliament for underperformance and inefficiency. When the Ministry and department were abolished in 2014, responsibility for matters relating to disability passed to the Department of Social Development, however this move was criticized by disability organisations. Disabled People South Africa (DPSA) organised a 150-person march to the Union Buildings in protest of government's decision to dissolve the department. DPSA spokesperson Olwethu Sipuka said that disabled people around the world felt that the decision to dissolve the department had taken disability rights in South Africa "10 steps backwards".

The Department of Social Development's 2015 White Paper on the Rights of Persons with Disabilities updated and supplemented the 1997 INDS by integrating the provisions of the CRPD and its Optional Protocol. SASSA wishes to stress that the only direct deduction from a social grant which is permitted is a deduction for funeral policy premiums which is managed under Regulation 26 (A) of the Social Assistance Act 2004. The regulation allows for one deduction, which may not exceed 10% of the value of the grant, from the adult grants (old age, war veterans and permanent disability grants) only.

== Advocacy ==
A wide range of advocacy and self-help organisations exist in South Africa. They range from the overtly political Disabled People South Africa, aligned with the ruling African National Congress, to single-issue national organisations such as the QuadPara Association of South Africa and local self-help groups that advocate for their members. A former chair of Disabled People South Africa, Maria Rantho (1953-2002), was the first wheelchair user elected to the National Assembly of South Africa.

In 2014, the South African Community Action Network implemented a hotline to report cars illegally parking in parking bays intended for people with disabilities, without displaying a disabled parking permit.

== Employment ==
Employment equity exists in legislation but in practice falls far short. Disabled South Africans are vastly more likely to be unemployed than the average. In a study published by the University of Johannesburg's Centre for Social Development in Africa (CSDA) in 2014, it was shown that 68% of working-age South Africans with disabilities had never attempted to seek employment.

== Social grants ==
The Department of Social Development offers qualifying residents income support in the form of disability grants via the South African Social Security Agency. The 2014 CSDA study showed that the grant was only received by 10% of the disabled people in South Africa. A 2010 study published by the University of Johannesburg, showed that 61% of disabled people living in the 8 poorest wards in Johannesburg were not accessing the state's disability grant due to various reasons, including not knowing that the grant existed.

== Education ==
The separate special schools policies of the Apartheid era created a system of schools for children with a wide variety of disabilities, with some schools specialising in educating blind, deaf or intellectually impaired students while others that catered for physically disabled students offered the standard academic curriculum coupled with medical and paramedical services to treat the pupils' impairments. As with the general population these schools were also racially segregated. The ones for white children were far better resourced than those for other racial groups. With the abolition of apartheid came a policy shift towards inclusive education with the ideal that most disabled children should attend the same schools as their non-disabled peers, however the process of making schools physically accessible and equipping and staffing them to accommodate such students has been very slow. The 2014 CSDA study showed that the proportion of people with disabilities in South Africa who had achieved a university degree had risen from 0,3% in 2002, to between 1% and 2% in 2014.

== Sport ==
=== Paralympics ===
The South African Paralympic team has consistently finished in the top half of the medal table at every Summer Paralympic Games since the country was re-admitted after the end of apartheid. At their readmission in the 1992 Summer Paralympics in Barcelona the team was ranked 27th by medal tally, in 2008 they reached sixth place, the team's best performance to date.

Notable South African Paralympians include:

- Oscar Pistorius – sprinting
- Natalie du Toit – swimming
- Ernst van Dyk – wheelchair racing and handcycling (current record holder of ten wins at the Boston Marathon)
- Kgothatso Montjane – wheelchair tennis

=== Deaflympics ===
South Africa has been participating at the Deaflympics regularly from 1993. Deaf swimmer and Olympic silver medallist Terence Parkin has won the most medals at the Deaflympics history with a tally of 33.

=== Other sports ===
The South Africa national blind cricket team won the inaugural Blind Cricket World Cup in 1998, defeating Pakistan in the final.
