= Sindisiwe Chikunga =

South African politician (born 1958)

The Honourable Sindisiwe Chikunga MP
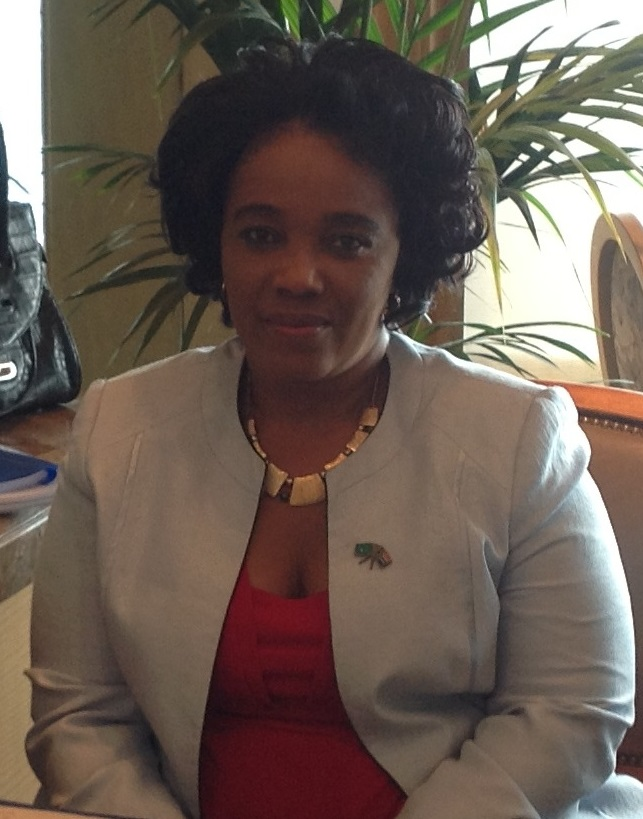
- Chikunga in 2013

Minister of Women, Youth and Persons with Disabilities
- Incumbent
- Assumed office 3 July 2024
- President: Cyril Ramaphosa
- Preceded by: Nkosazana Dlamini-Zuma

Minister of Social Development
- Acting
- Assumed office 14 May 2026
- President: Cyril Ramaphosa
- Deputy: Ganief Hendricks
- Preceded by: Sisisi Tolashe

Minister of Transport
- In office 7 March 2023 – 30 June 2024
- President: Cyril Ramaphosa
- Deputy: Lisa Mangcu
- Preceded by: Fikile Mbalula
- Succeeded by: Barbara Creecy

Deputy Minister of Transport
- In office 5 August 2021 – 6 March 2023
- President: Cyril Ramaphosa
- Preceded by: Dikeledi Magadzi
- Succeeded by: Lisa Mangcu
- In office 12 June 2012 – 29 May 2019
- President: Jacob Zuma; Cyril Ramaphosa
- Preceded by: Jeremy Cronin
- Succeeded by: Dikeledi Magadzi

Deputy Minister of Public Service and Administration
- In office 30 May 2019 – 5 August 2021
- President: Cyril Ramaphosa
- Preceded by: Chana Pilane-Majake
- Succeeded by: Chana Pilane-Majake

Personal details
- Born: Sindisiwe Lydia Gcaba; 9 November 1958 (age 68) Muden, Natal Province, Union of South Africa
- Party: African National Congress
- Children: 2 (1 deceased)
- Education: University of South Africa; University of Pretoria

Sindisiwe Lydia Chikunga (née Gcaba; born 9 November 1958) is a South African politician who is serving as the Minister in the Presidency for Women, Youth and Persons with Disabilities since 2024, and acting Minister of Social Development following the dismissal of Sisisi Tolashe. A member of the African National Congress, she has been a Member of the National Assembly of South Africa since 2004. Chikunga had previously served as Deputy Minister of Transport twice, from 2012 to 2019 and again from 2021 to 2023, as Deputy Minister of Public Service and Administration from 2019 until 2021, and as Minister of Transport from 2023 to 2024. She is a midwife by profession.

== Early life and education ==
Chikunga was born in Muden in present-day KwaZulu-Natal. Her father was Lutheran church pastor Rev Lucas Gcaba. During her childhood, her family frequently moved between towns, from Muden to Greytown and on to Kopleegte where she attended primary school.

She holds a Bachelor of Arts and an Honours degree in Curationis from the University of South Africa as well as a Master of Arts in Curationis from the University of Pretoria. From the Edendale Nursing College, she obtained both a Diploma in Midwifery and a Diploma in Nursing Science. At the time of her appointment as Minister of Transport in March 2023, she was studying for a master's degree in political sciences from the University of South Africa. Chikunga worked as a nurse in Mpumalanga.

== Political career ==
Chikunga became a member of the DCO Makiwane Youth League in the 1980s. She has also held leadership positions in the African National Congress in Mpumalanga; she was an ex officio member of the ANC's Gert Sibande Regional Executive Committee (REC) and also served as chairperson and as deputy chairperson of the region. Chikunga was also an ex officio member of the Regional Executive Committee of the African National Congress Women's League. She is a former member of the ANC Provincial Executive Committee in Mpumalanga.

Chikunga became a Member of Parliament for the ANC in 2004. During her tenure as an ANC MP, she served on the Portfolio Committee on Correctional Services, the Joint Budget Portfolio Committee, the Portfolio Committee on Housing, the Committee on Auditor General as well as the Joint Standing Committee on Defence. From 2009 to 2012, Chikunga was chairperson of the Portfolio Committee on Police during which she frequently clashed with National Police Commissioner Bheki Cele.

== National government ==
On 12 June 2012, Chikunga was appointed as Deputy Minister of Transport by president Jacob Zuma during his cabinet reshuffle. She remained as Deputy Minister of Transport after Zuma announced a major overhaul of his cabinet after being sworn in for a second term as president in May 2014. After Zuma resigned as president and was succeeded by Cyril Ramaphosa in February 2018, Chikunga remained as Deputy Minister of Transport.

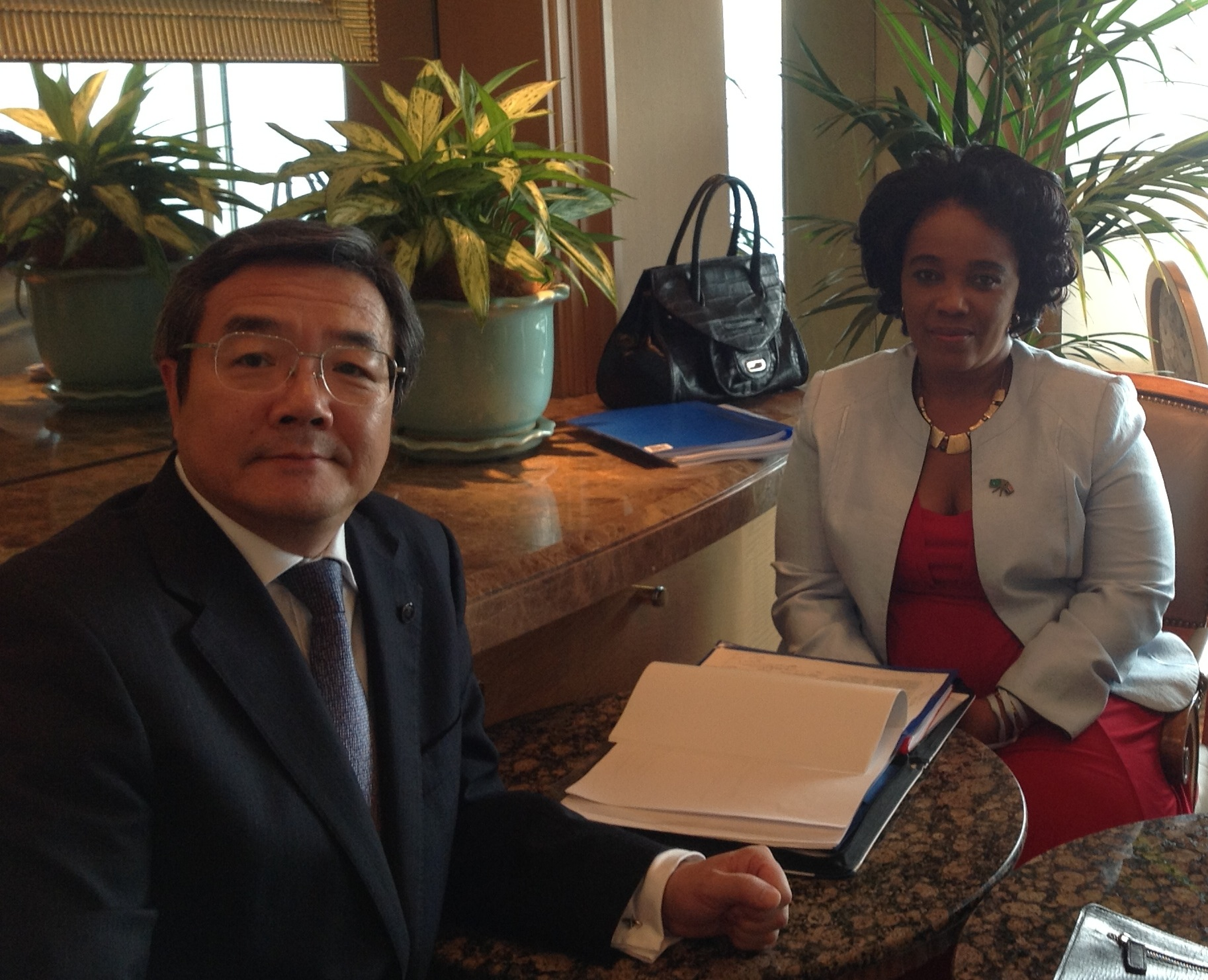
Chikunga at the African Development Conference held in June 2013 in Japan

In March 2018, it was reported that Chikunga was allegedly refusing to return two of her old official cars, a BMW X6 and a BMW GT, even after the Transport Department bought her two new official cars, a BMW X5 and a Jaguar F-Type. Chikunga was also accused of allowing a family member to fill up her petrol tank with the Avis petrol card of the state-hired car she was given.

Following the 2019 general election, Chikunga was appointed as Deputy Minister of the Public Service and Administration portfolio by Ramaphosa, while Dikeledi Magadzi took over as Deputy Minister of Transport. Chikunga was reappointed as Deputy Minister of Transport in a cabinet reshuffle in August 2021. Following the 2024 general election, she was appointed Minister of Women, Youth and Persons with Disabilities.

=== Minister of Transport (2023–2024) ===
After the previous Minister of Transport, Fikile Mbalula, was elected as Secretary-General of the African National Congress, a position which requires him to be at Luthuli House full-time, at the party's 55th National Conference held in December 2022, it became known that Mbalula would soon depart from government to take up the party position. Ramaphosa reshuffled his cabinet on 6 March 2023 during which he named Chikunga as Mbalula's successor as Transport Minister. Lisa Mangcu was appointed the new Deputy Minister of Transport. Chikunga and all the other newly appointed ministers and deputy ministers were sworn into office the following day by Chief Justice Ray Zondo in a ceremony at Tuynhuys.

On 24 March 2023, Chikunga denied claims by the Economic Freedom Fighters, an opposition party, that she sabotaged their National Shutdown protest on 20 March by instructing bus companies to cancel their services and not transport EFF supporters wanting to attend the protest.

=== Robbery ===
On 6 November 2023, Chikunga was robbed at gunpoint by three masked individuals after her vehicle stopped along the N3 highway outside Johannesburg to change a tyre that hit a deliberately planted spike. In a parliamentary inquiry, she said that the robbers forced her bodyguards onto the floor and opened the car door before pointing a gun at her head and forcing her out. The robbers took her laptop and phone, as well as other personal effects and two of her bodyguards' pistols.

== Personal life ==
Chikunga's late husband's father was born in Malawi. She had two sons with her husband.

One of Chikunga's sons, his wife and their four children died in a car accident on the N11 highway between Mpumalanga and KwaZulu-Natal on 17 July 2022.
