= Susan Shabangu =

South African politician (born 1956)

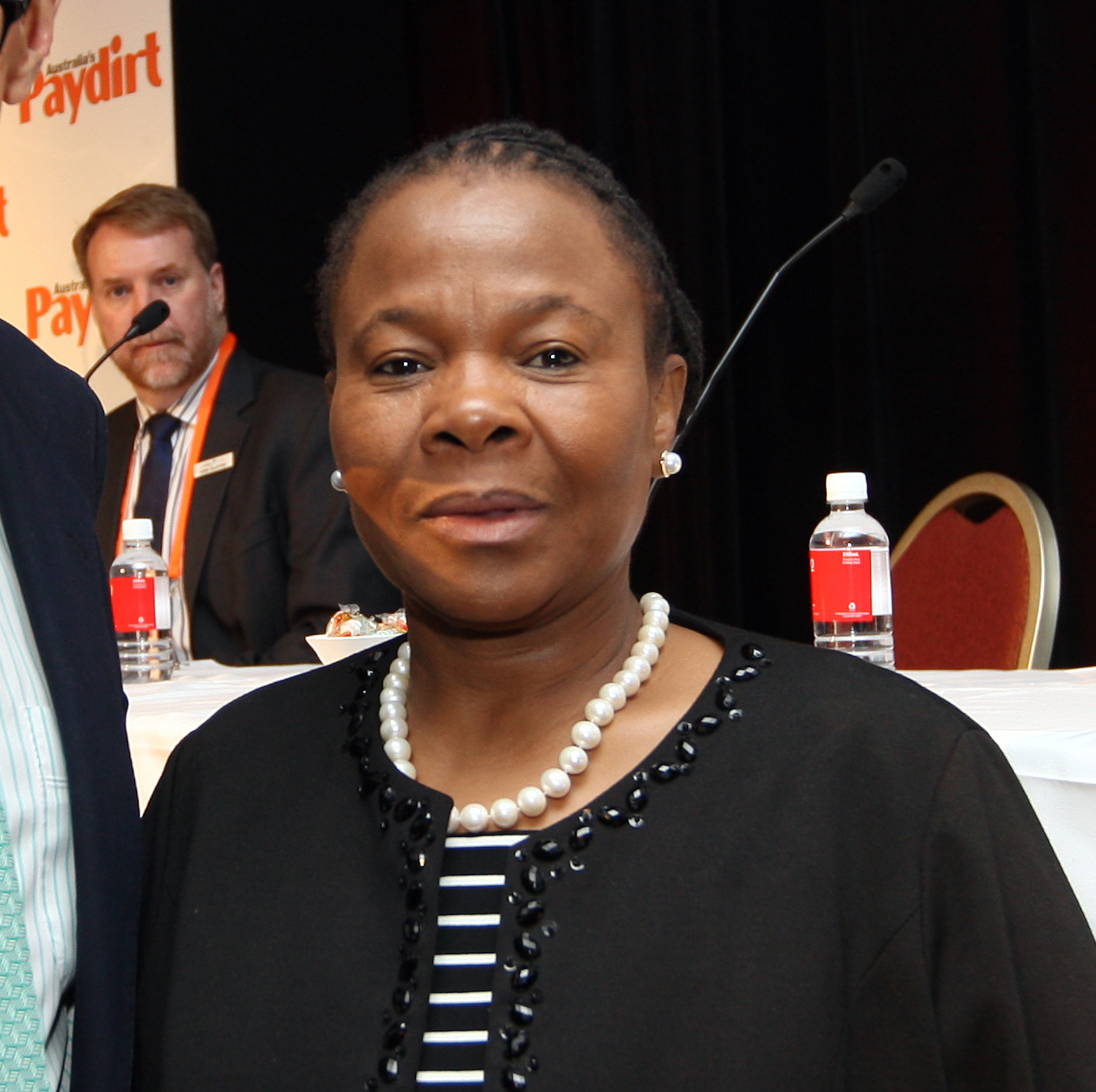
- Shabangu in 2012

Member of the National Assembly
- In office 9 May 1994 – 3 June 2019

Minister of Social Development
- In office 26 February 2018 – 29 May 2019
- President: Cyril Ramaphosa
- Deputy: Hendrietta Bogopane-Zulu
- Preceded by: Bathabile Dlamini
- Succeeded by: Lindiwe Zulu

Minister of Women in the Presidency
- In office 26 May 2014 – 26 February 2018
- President: Jacob Zuma
- Preceded by: Lulu Xingwana (for Women, Children and Persons with Disability)
- Succeeded by: Bathabile Dlamini

Minister of Mineral Resources
- In office 11 May 2009 – 25 May 2014
- President: Jacob Zuma
- Deputy: Godfrey Oliphant
- Preceded by: Buyelwa Sonjica
- Succeeded by: Ngoako Ramatlhodi

Personal details
- Born: 28 February 1956 (age 69)
- Political party: African National Congress

Susan Shabangu (born 28 February 1956) is a South African politician and former trade unionist. She represented the African National Congress (ANC) in the National Assembly of South Africa between May 1994 and June 2019. During that time she was a cabinet minister from 2009 to 2019.

Shabangu served as Minister of Social Development from February 2018 to May 2019, as Minister of Women from May 2014 to February 2018, and as Minister of Mineral Resources from May 2009 to May 2014. She entered the national executive in March 1996 as Deputy Minister of Minerals and Energy in Nelson Mandela's government, and she also served as Deputy Minister of Safety and Security in Thabo Mbeki's government. She was a member of the ANC National Executive Committee between December 2007 and December 2022.

== Education ==
Susan Shabangu completed her high school career at Madibane High School in Soweto in 1977.

== Trade union activism ==
Before being elected to government, Shabangu was active in the labour movement. From 1980 to 1985, she was Assistant Secretary for the Federation of South African Women (FEDSAW). She was also a member of the Federation of Transvaal Women (FEDTRAW). In 1981 she was part of the Anti-Republic Campaign Committee. In 1982, she worked with the Release Mandela Campaign Committee. During 1984-85 she organized the Amalgamated Black Workers Project. She served on the Industrial Council and was the National Women's Coordinator of the Transport and General Workers Union (T&GWU). She served on the National Women's Sub-committee of the Congress of South African Trade Unions (COSATU).

== Early career in government ==
In South Africa's first democratic elections in April 1994, Shabangu was elected to represent the African National Congress (ANC) in the National Assembly, the lower house of the new South African Parliament. With Joyce Mabudafhasi and Elizabeth Thabethe, she was one of three women who represented COSATU, the ANC's Tripartite Alliance partner, in the ANC caucus. She was a backbencher for two years, during which time she served on various portfolio committees.

On 28 March 1996, President Nelson Mandela announced that he had decided to create the office of the Deputy Minister of Minerals and Energy. Shabangu was appointed as the inaugural holder of the office. She deputised Pik Botha of the opposition National Party until May 1996, when Botha's party left the Government of National Unity; from then onwards she was deputy to new Minister Penuell Maduna. While serving in the ministry, Shabangu was also an advisor to COSATU's September Commission, which, under the leadership of Connie September, surveyed unionism's prospects in the post-apartheid era.

Shabangu served as Deputy Minister of Minerals and Energy until the April 2004 general election, a period that spanned the remainder of Mandela's presidency and the first term of Thabo Mbeki's presidency. After the 2004 election, announcing his new cabinet on 28 April 2004, President Mbeki appointed her as Deputy Minister of Safety and Security under Minister Charles Nqakula. In that portfolio she was best known for the widespread controversy that arose in April 2008, when, speaking of criminals, she told an audience of police officers in Pretoria that, "You must kill the bastards if they threaten you or the community".

== Ministerial career ==
=== Mineral Resources: 2009–2014 ===
In the April 2009 general election, Shabangu was re-elected to her parliamentary seat and Jacob Zuma took office as president. On 10 May 2009, Zuma announced that he would elevate Shabangu to his cabinet as Minister of Mineral Resources (initially called Minister of Mining). The portfolio was newly reconfigured, having previously been a part of the Ministry of Minerals and Energy. Shabangu served without a deputy until 31 October 2010, when Zuma appointed Godfrey Oliphant as Deputy Minister of Mineral Resources.

In August 2012, following the Marikana massacre at Lonmin Platinum Mine near Rustenburg where 44 people were killed after police opened fire on striking workers belonging to the Association of Mineworkers and Construction Union (AMCU), Shabangu visited the area. Tasked with investigating what had happened, she reported to Parliament on 21 August 2012 that she had engaged all "affected parties". When questioned at the Marikana Commission of Inquiry on 26 August 2014 she admitted that these did not include the AMCU or representatives of the striking workers.

=== Women: 2014–2018 ===
Shabangu was re-elected to the National Assembly in the May 2014 general election and she was appointed to Zuma's second-term cabinet, which was announced on 25 May. Zuma named her as Minister of Women, a reconfigured portfolio newly relocated to the Presidency. When the Department of Women tabled its five-year strategic plan in 2015, the Mail & Guardian noted that 40 per cent of the department's R200-million annual budget was allocated to administration, remarking that the plan suggested that "Shabangu is supposed to be running some sort of research-heavy lobby group that spends too much money on administration and is unlikely to actually advance the cause of women one iota".

Shabangu was one of 35 signatories to an open letter, coordinated by the One Campaign, which urged Angela Merkel of the G7 and Nkosazana Dlamini-Zuma of the African Union to emphasise women's interests in international development initiatives. In South Africa, she established a policy task team on access to feminine hygiene products. Her ministry was also tasked with addressing gender-based violence, though she was sometimes criticised for insensitive messaging on the subject.

In August 2016, Shabangu was the acting President of South Africa while both Zuma and his deputy were both in Swaziland at a meeting of the Southern African Development Community.

=== Social Development: 2018–2019 ===
In February 2018, Cyril Ramaphosa replaced Zuma in a midterm presidential election. Announcing his new cabinet on 26 February 2018, he appointed Shabangu as Minister of Social Development. She succeeded Bathabile Dlamini, who took over her former portfolio. The Daily Maverick described her new ministry as "a poisoned chalice of note"; her main task was to stabilise the social welfare system in the aftermath of the grants crisis.

Shabangu was re-elected to her parliamentary seat in the May 2019 general election, ranked 63rd on the ANC's national list. However, Ramaphosa's second-term cabinet, announced on 29 May, did not include Shabangu. The following week she announced her resignation from Parliament. The resignation took effect on 3 June 2019.

== Later career ==
In 2020, to the disapproval of the opposition Democratic Alliance, the Minister of Human Settlements, Water and Sanitation, Lindiwe Sisulu, appointed Shabangu to a ministerial advisory committee on the water sector. Defending the appointment in the Standing Committee on Public Accounts, Sisulu pointed to Shabangu's trade union experience as evidence of expertise in labour law, telling legislators that, "Susan Shabangu has more experience, more understanding of politics, more understanding of government than you could ever have."

Shabangu's third term on the ANC National Executive Committee ended at the party's 55th National Conference in December 2017, and she was not re-elected.

== Personal life ==
In March 2003 Shabangu was charged with public indecency after an altercation with an airport security official at Johannesburg International Airport. She had lifted her dress in exasperation after repeatedly being asked to pass through a metal detector.

Her daughter is a social worker.
