= Imbali =

- Location within KwaZulu-Natal Location within South Africa
- Coordinates: 29°40′S 30°21′E
- Country: South Africa
- Province: KwaZulu-Natal
- District: UMgungundlovu
- Municipality: Msunduzi

Area
  - Total: 4.33 km^{2} (1.67 sq mi)

Population (2011)
  - Total: 30,157
  - Density: 6,960/km^{2} (18,000/sq mi)

Racial makeup (2011)
  - Black African: 99.5%
  - Coloured: 0.2%
  - Indian/Asian: 0.1%
  - White: 0.1%

First languages (2011)
  - Zulu: 94.1%
  - English: 2.2%
  - Other: 3.7%
- Time zone: UTC+2 (SAST)
- Postal code (street): 3201
- PO box: 3219

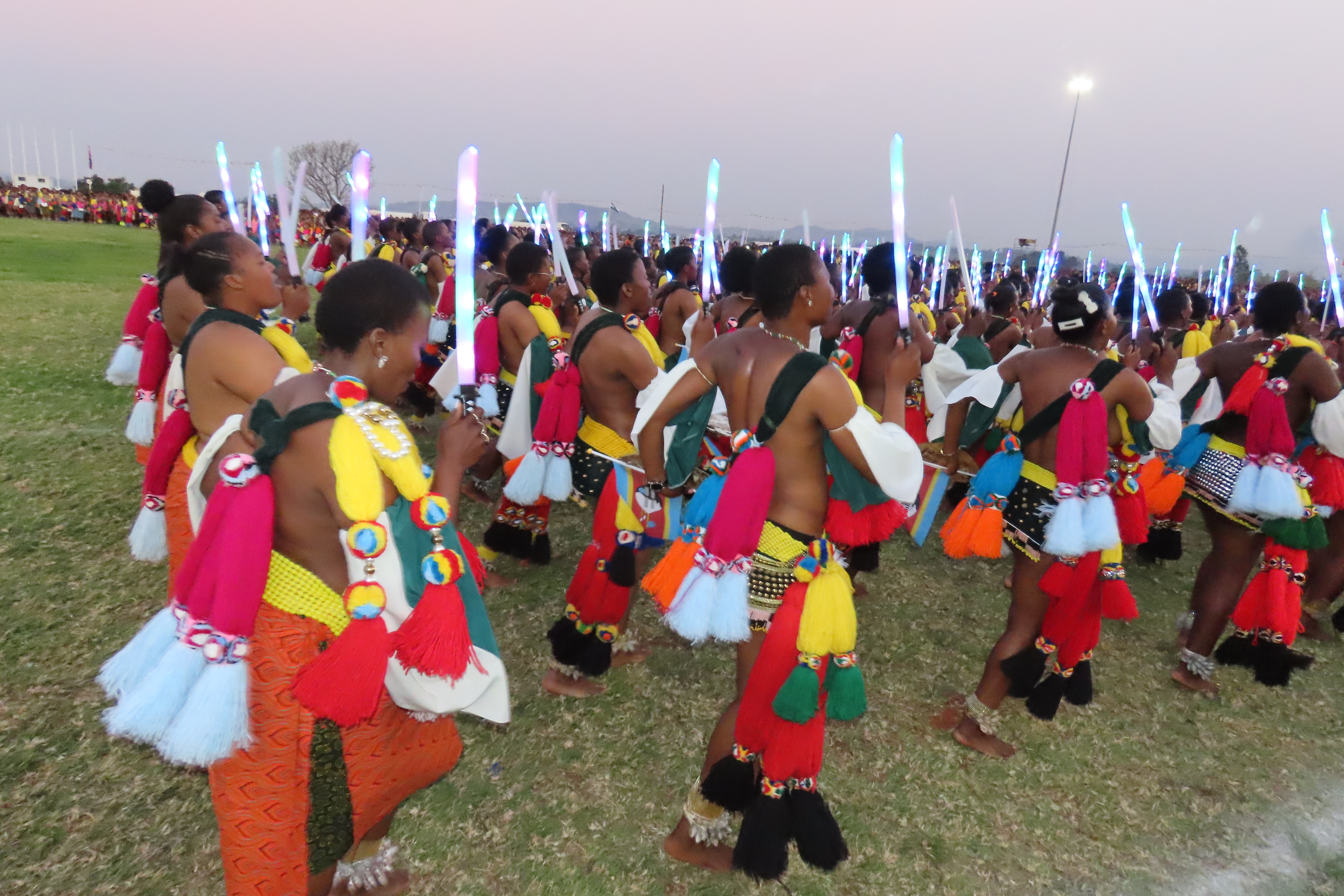

Imbali is a township in KwaZulu-Natal, South Africa. It is 15 km from Pietermaritzburg, the capital city of KwaZulu-Natal. Imbali was founded in the early 1960s when people were moving away from the rural areas to look for employment in the city.

== Notable residents ==
- Bathabile Dlamini - Leader of the African National Congress Women's League (ANCWL).Previously the Minister of Women, Youth and Persons with Disabilities (South Africa), and Minister of Social Development (South Africa).
- Luyanda Ntshangase - Footballer who played in the South African Premier Division for Maritzburg United.
- Zoë Modiga - Palesa Nomthandazo Phumelele Modiga, professionally known as Zoë Modiga is a South African singer and songwriter. Modiga first gained recognition as contestant on The Voice South Africa 2016.
