= AllPay v CEO of SASSA =

South African legal case

AllPay Consolidated Investment Holdings (Pty) Ltd and Others v Chief Executive Officer of the South African Social Security Agency and Others is the name of three related decisions of the Constitutional Court of South Africa, handed down in 2013, 2014, and 2015 respectively. The decisions led to the invalidation of an irregular contract between the South African Social Security Agency and Cash Paymaster Services for the administration of social grants nationwide, precipitating the grants crisis of 2017. Litigation continued in Black Sash v Minister of Social Development.

== AllPay I: 2013 ==
AllPay v CEO of SASSA I
- Court: Constitutional Court of South Africa
- Full case name: Allpay Consolidated Investment Holdings (Pty) Ltd and Others v Chief Executive Officer of the South African Social Security Agency and Others
- Decided: 29 November 2013
- Docket nos.: CCT 48/13
- Citations: [2013] ZACC 42; 2014 (1) SA 604 (CC); 2014 (1) BCLR 1 (CC)

Case history
- Prior actions: Supreme Court of Appeal – AllPay v CEO of SASSA [2013] ZASCA 29; North Gauteng High Court – AllPay v CEO of SASSA [2012] ZASCA 185

Court membership
- Judges sitting: Mogoeng CJ, Moseneke DCJ, Cameron J, Froneman J, Jafta J, Madlanga J, Nkabinde J, Skweyiya J, van der Westhuizen J, Zondo J and Mhlantla AJ

Case opinions
- The South African Social Security Agency's award of a tender to Cash Paymaster Services for the administration of social grants is constitutionally invalid.
- Decision by: Froneman J (unanimous)

=== Background ===
In February 2012, the South African Social Security Agency (SASSA) awarded a R10-billion tender to Cash Paymaster Services, a subsidiary of Net 1 UEPS Technologies, under which Cash Paymaster was contracted to administer the payment of social grants to millions of beneficiaries countrywide. An unsuccessful tenderer, AllPay Consolidated Holdings, contended that this contract was constitutionally invalid. In particular, it alleged that there had been procedural irregularities, inter alia, in the composition of the bid evaluation committee, in the due diligence conducted in respect of Cash Paymaster's black economic empowerment (BEE) compliance, and in SASSA's issuing of a "bidders' notice" in June 2011. AllPay therefore held that the tender process was inconsistent with section 217(1) of the Constitution, which required that public procurement processes must be carried out "in accordance with a system which is fair, equitable, transparent, competitive and cost-effective".

=== Prior action ===
AllPay applied to the High Court of South Africa for judicial review of the tender award. In August 2012, Judge Elias Matojane of the High Court's North Gauteng Division issued a declaratory order in AllPay's favour, holding that the tender process had indeed been invalid. However, he declined to set the award aside, fearing that the practical effect of such a move would be to disrupt the delivery of social grants on which millions of residents relied.

AllPay appealed to the Supreme Court of Appeal against the High Court's refusal to set the award aside, while Cash Paymaster cross-appealed the declaration of invalidity. In March 2013, in a unanimous judgment authored by Judge of Appeal Robert Nugent, the Supreme Court found in Cash Paymaster's favour, overturning the declaratory order of the High Court. The Supreme Court held, controversially, that it was not in the public interest to invalidate the tender because of what it called "inconsequential irregularities": procedural irregularities which had not affected the outcome of the tender process.

AllPay thus appealed to the Constitutional Court of South Africa. The Constitutional Court heard argument on 10 September 2013, and it delivered judgment on 29 November 2013. Corruption Watch and the Centre for Child Law were admitted as amici curiae.

=== Judgment ===
The Constitutional Court's judgment was written by Justice Johan Froneman on behalf of a unanimous bench which also included Chief Justice Mogoeng Mogoeng, Deputy Chief Justice Dikgang Moseneke, Acting Justice Nonkosi Mhlantla, and Justices Edwin Cameron, Chris Jafta, Mbuyiseli Madlanga, Bess Nkabinde, Thembile Skweyiya, Johann van der Westhuizen, and Raymond Zondo. The court found in AllPay's favour, upholding its appeal and reinstating the High Court's declaratory order to the effect that the award of the tender to Cash Paymaster was constitutionally invalid.

In reaching this conclusion, Froneman deviated markedly from the approach employed by the Supreme Court of Appeal. He set out the following prescripts for evaluating the lawfulness of a tender award:

- "The suggestion that 'inconsequential irregularities' are of no moment conflates the test for irregularities and their import; hence an assessment of the fairness and lawfulness of the procurement process must be independent of the outcome of the tender process.
- The materiality of compliance with legal requirements depends on the extent to which the purpose of the requirements is attained.
- The constitutional and legislative procurement framework entails supply chain management prescripts that are legally binding.
- The fairness and lawfulness of the procurement process must be assessed in terms of the provisions of the Promotion of Administrative Justice Act.
- Black economic empowerment generally requires substantive participation in the management and running of any enterprise.
- The remedy stage is where appropriate consideration must be given to the public interest in the consequences of setting the procurement process aside.

Applying this framework, the court dismissed several of AllPay's arguments about alleged irregularities in aspects of the tender process. However, it found that there had been two material irregularities, both in contravention of provisions of the Promotion of Administrative Justice Act: SASSA had not required Cash Paymaster to substantiate its claim that its BEE partners would manage and execute over 74 per cent of the tender, and SASSA's bidders' notice of June 2011 had created "vagueness and uncertainty" about the criteria used in the tender process. On these grounds, the award of the tender was invalid.

However, the court reserved judgment on the relief to be granted, pending a further hearing on 11 February 2014. Like the High Court, the court was perturbed by submissions which warned that setting aside the Cash Paymaster contract would cause "great disruption" to grant beneficiaries. Moreover, Froneman found that the question of remedy raised "difficult factual and legal issues" which could not adequately be resolved with the information currently available to the court. The court therefore suspended its order of invalidity and directed the disputants and amici curiae to furnish additional factual information and argument on the administration of social grants, the costs involved in implementing a new grants system, and possible means of ameliorating such costs.

== AllPay II: 2014 ==
AllPay v CEO of SASSA II
- Court: Constitutional Court of South Africa
- Full case name: Allpay Consolidated Investment Holdings (Pty) Ltd and Others v Chief Executive Officer of the South African Social Security Agency and Others (No. 2)
- Decided: 17 April 2014
- Docket nos.: CCT 48/13
- Citations: [2014] ZACC 12; 2014 (6) BCLR 641 (CC); 2014 (4) SA 179 (CC)

Court membership
- Judges sitting: Moseneke ACJ, Cameron J, Froneman J, Jafta J, Khampepe J, Madlanga J, van der Westhuizen J, Zondo J, Dambuza AJ and Majiedt AJ

Case opinions
- Decision by: Froneman J (unanimous)

As it had directed in AllPay I, the Constitutional Court heard argument on the question of relief on 11 February 2014. Deputy Chief Justice Moseneke (now acting as Chief Justice) and Justices Cameron, Froneman, Jafta, Madlanga, van der Westhuizen, and Zondo remained on the bench; they were newly joined by Justice Sisi Khampepe and Acting Justices Nambitha Dambuza and Steven Majiedt. The court's judgment was handed down on 17 April 2014; like the judgment in AllPay I, it was unanimous and was written by Justice Froneman.

=== Judgment ===
In its order, the court ordered SASSA to initiate a new tender process for the administration of social grants, holding that Cash Paymaster "has no right to benefit from an unlawful contract". In order to minimise the disruption to the delivery of social grants, it suspended its order of invalidity against the AllPay contract so that it would take effect only after SASSA had awarded a new tender.

The court also imposed a structural interdict, an unusual remedy which required SASSA to make quarterly reports to the Registrar of the Constitutional Court on the progress of the tender evaluation process. Cash Paymaster was also required to provide the court with an audited financial statement of the expenses and income it had incurred under the invalid contract.

== AllPay III: 2015 ==
In AllPay Consolidated Investment Holdings (Pty) Ltd and Others v Chief Executive Officer of the South African Social Security Agency and Others (CCT 48/13) [2015] ZACC 7; 2015 (6) BCLR 653 (CC) (24 March 2015), the court heard a challenge lodged by AllPay against the new request for proposals that SASSA had issued to replace the invalidated tender.

== Aftermath ==
The invalidation of the Cash Paymaster contract in AllPay II, and the intransigence of SASSA, led to the grants crisis of 2017 and to a related sequence of litigation in the Constitutional Court in Black Sash v Minister of Social Development.
