= Bathabile Dlamini =

South African politician (born 1962)

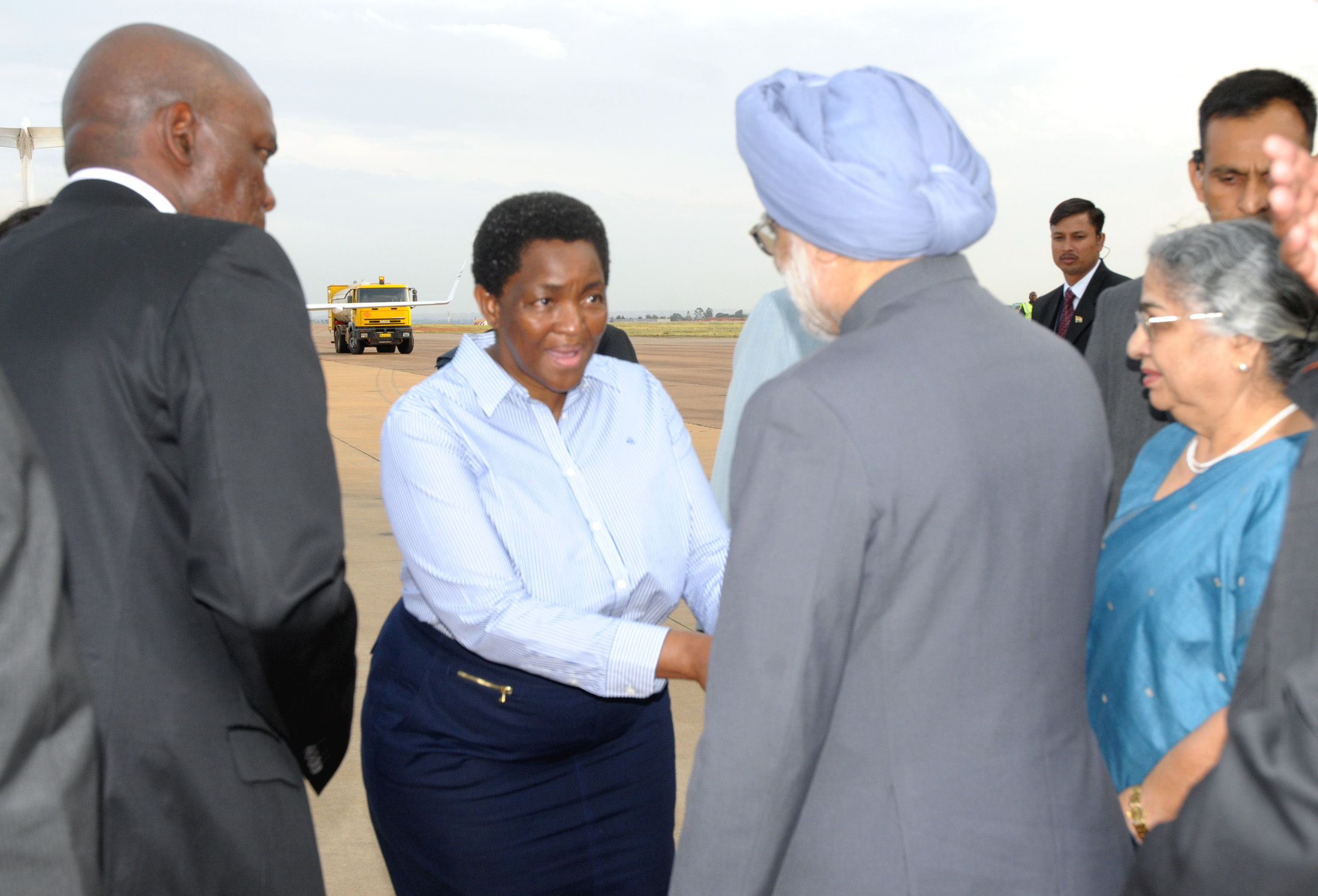
- Dlamini (second from left) meets Manmohan Singh

6th President of the African National Congress Women's League
- In office 7 August 2015 – April 2022
- Deputy: Sisi Ntombela
- Preceded by: Angie Motshekga
- Succeeded by: Sisisi Tolashe

Minister in the Presidency for Women
- In office 27 February 2018 – 29 May 2019
- President: Cyril Ramaphosa
- Preceded by: Susan Shabangu
- Succeeded by: Maite Nkoana-Mashabane

Minister of Social Development
- In office 1 November 2010 – 27 February 2018
- President: Jacob Zuma; Cyril Ramaphosa
- Preceded by: Edna Molewa
- Succeeded by: Susan Shabangu

Personal details
- Born: Bathabile Olive Dlamini; 10 September 1962 (age 63) Nquthu, Natal; South Africa
- Citizenship: South Africa
- Party: African National Congress
- Education: University of Zululand

Bathabile Dlamini (born 10 September 1962) is a South African politician who was the President of the African National Congress (ANC) Women's League from 2015 to 2022. She was previously the Minister in the Presidency for Women from 2018 to 2019 and the Minister of Social Development from 2010 to 2018.

A social worker by training, Dlamini rose to national political prominence in the ANC Women's League, where she was Secretary General from 1998 to 2008. She was also a Member of Parliament between 1994 and 2004. In 2006, she was convicted of having defrauded Parliament in the travel allowance reimbursement scandal. She was first elected to the ANC National Executive Committee in 2007 and became an outspoken supporter of former President Jacob Zuma, who appointed her to his cabinet. Although she served briefly as Minister for Women under Zuma's successor, Cyril Ramaphosa, she was removed from the cabinet after the May 2019 general election and resigned from the National Assembly the following month.

As Social Development Minister, Dlamini was a central figure in the 2017 social grants crisis which nearly disabled the South African Social Security Agency and social welfare system. The Constitutional Court and an official inquiry into her conduct both concluded that her personal negligence had contributed to the crisis. In April 2022, she was additionally convicted of perjury for having lied under oath during the inquiry. In the same month, she was removed as President of the ANC Women's League when the ANC disbanded the league's leadership corps on the grounds that it had exceeded its five-year term. Her perjury conviction also disqualified her from standing for election to a fourth five-year term on the ANC National Executive Committee.

== Early life and career ==
Bathabile Olive Dlamini was born on 10 September 1962 in Nquthu in what was then Natal province, now part of KwaZulu-Natal. She grew up in Matshensikazi, near Nkandla, and in Imbali, a township outside Pietermaritzburg. In 1983, she was a founding member of Imbali Youth Organisation, a civic organisation affiliated to the United Democratic Front. She joined the South African National Students Congress, another Congress-aligned organisation, in 1985. In 1989, she graduated from the University of Zululand with a Bachelor of Arts in social work. From 1991 to 1993, she worked as a social worker at a non-governmental organisation for the physically disabled called the Pietermaritzburg Cripples Association.

During the same period, from 1991, Dlamini was part of the interim regional leadership of the African National Congress (ANC) Women's League (ANCWL) in the Natal Midlands. The ANC had recently been unbanned by the apartheid government and the interim leadership was tasked with rebuilding the organisational structures of the ANCWL inside South Africa. She was formally elected as the Regional Secretary of the ANCWL in the Natal Midlands in 1992 and held that position until December 1993, when she was elected Deputy Secretary General of the national ANCWL, serving under Secretary General Nosiviwe Mapisa-Nqakula.

== Parliamentary career ==
In South Africa's first post-apartheid election in 1994, Dlamini was elected as a Member of the National Assembly, the lower house of the new South African Parliament. Between then and 2004, she served on the Portfolio Committees of Correctional Services and Social Development. Simultaneously, she was Secretary General of the ANCWL, a position which she held from 1998 to 2008.

=== Travelgate ===
In 2005, Dlamini was one of the politicians implicated by the Scorpions in South Africa's Travelgate scandal, which concerned the abuse of parliamentary travel vouchers. The National Prosecuting Authority alleged that Dlamini had used parliamentary travel vouchers – designated for air travel expenses only – to cover the costs of hotel accommodation, car rentals, and other benefits. The following year, in October 2006, she pled guilty to fraud in relation to an amount of R254,000 and was sentenced to a R120,000 fine or ten years' imprisonment with five years suspended. She paid the fine.

=== Party positions ===
After her conviction, Dlamini retained her position as ANCWL Secretary General, having been elected to a second five-year term in 2003. She also became involved in the foundation of the Progressive Women's Movement of South Africa, launched in 2006. Within the ANC, Dlamini – unlike the rest of the ANCWL leadership, then headed by Nosiviwe Mapisa-Nqakula – was a strong supporter of ANC Deputy President Jacob Zuma, who ultimately succeeded in ousting Thabo Mbeki from the ANC presidency at the party's 52nd National Conference in December 2007. At the same conference, Dlamini was elected to a five-year term on the National Executive Committee of the mainstream ANC, and she simultaneously served on the party's National Working Committee.

At the conclusion of her term as ANCWL Secretary General, Dlamini stood to succeed Mapisa-Nqakula as ANCWL President, but in July 2008 she was defeated in a vote by Angie Motshekga. However, Dlamini was elected to an ordinary seat on the ANCWL National Executive Committee. In 2008, she also worked as a full-time employee of the ANC as a sectoral work co-ordinator in the office of newly elected ANC President Zuma.

== Career in cabinet ==
=== Ministry of Social Development: 2009–2018 ===
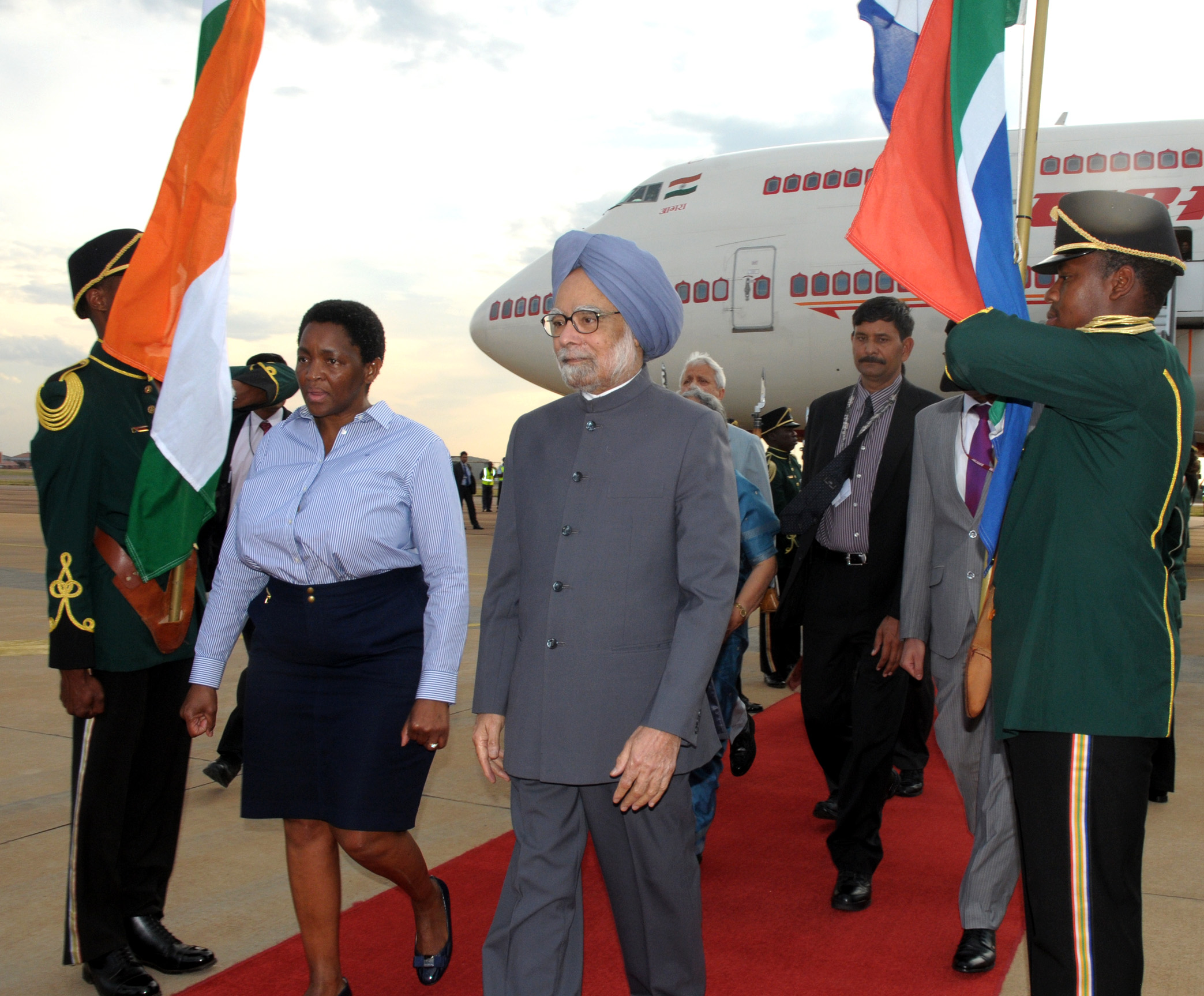
Bathabile receiving Indian Prime Minister Manmohan Singh at Waterkloof Air Force Base on 17 October 2011

Dlamini was re-elected to a seat in the National Assembly in the 2009 general election, which also saw Zuma elected as President of South Africa. On 11 May 2009, Zuma appointed her Deputy Minister of Social Development under Minister Edna Molewa. She served as Deputy Minister until 31 October 2010, when Zuma announced a cabinet reshuffle in which Dlamini replaced Molewa as Minister of Social Development.

Dlamini remained in the social development portfolio for the rest of Zuma's presidency, securing appointment to his second cabinet after the 2014 general election. As Minister, she chaired the inter-ministerial committees on gender-based violence, combating substance abuse, and early childhood development. During her tenure, the gender-based violence committee launched the Gender-Based Violence Command Centre, a 24-hour call centre which counselled victims of gender-based violence.

==== Ministerial expenses ====
In June 2016, the opposition Democratic Alliance (DA) criticised Dlamini for arguing that social grant recipients should be able to survive on a monthly payment of R753, pointing out that she had herself spent R11,000 on a short stay in a luxury hotel in Umhlanga Rocks. Later that year, the Sunday Times reported that the Department of Social Development had spent R1.3 million on Dlamini's ministerial vehicle, a BMW 740i, as well as R1.1 million on a Jeep Grand Cherokee for her deputy, Hendrietta Bogopane-Zulu; both expenditures exceeded the National Treasury's procurement limit for official vehicles.

In May 2017, under questioning by Parliament's Standing Committee on Public Accounts, Dlamini admitted that the South African Social Security Agency (SASSA) had paid from its budget to hire private security for her children, according to her because of various threats to the children's safety. In 2018, Dlamini's successor as Social Development Minister, Susan Shabangu, reported that SASSA had spent just over R2 million on these protection services in the 2014/2015 financial year and that the department was undertaking steps to recoup the money spent.

==== Grants crisis ====
In 2014, the South African Constitutional Court ruled that SASSA had followed an improper tendering procedure in arranging a contract with a private company, Cash Paymaster Services, which was hired to distribute South Africa's social grants (at that time worth R10 billion each month) to beneficiaries. The court declared the Cash Paymaster Services contract invalid and ordered SASSA to rerun the tender process. When the process was rerun, SASSA extended the Cash Paymasters Services until 1 April 2017 but decided that, upon the expiry of the contract, it would in-source the distribution of social grants and pay out the grants itself. However, by mid-March 2017, SASSA had not prepared to take over grants distribution nor found an alternative service provider, raising fears – dismissed by Dlamini, SASSA's political custodian – that grants would not be paid in April, with disastrous effects for the 17 million residents dependent on them. The crisis was ameliorated on 17 March, when the Constitutional Court responded to an application by Black Sash (joined by Corruption Watch, the South African Post Office, and others) and ordered SASSA to extend the contract with Cash Paymaster Services for another year.

During the crisis, President Zuma defended Dlamini, dismissing calls to fire her and saying that her performance in the matter could not be evaluated until the 1 April deadline passed. However, Dlamini was widely criticised for her inaction in the months and years before the contract's expiry, as well as for her handling of the media during the crisis. She claimed that she had not taken action earlier because it was not until October 2016 that she became aware that SASSA was not prepared to implement the proposed takeover. In the 17 March judgement, written by Justice Johan Froneman with the full bench concurring, the Constitutional Court singled out Dlamini as partly personally responsible for causing the crisis and concluded that she, as the Minister responsible for SASSA, was "ultimately responsible" for the crisis in its entirety. Echoing the sentiment expressed by Chief Justice Mogoeng Mogoeng during oral arguments, Froneman wrote that "there is no indication... that [Dlamini] showed any interest in SASSA's progress" until late 2016. Indeed, constitutional law expert Pierre de Vos said that the judgement contained "the most scathing criticism of a member of the executive that I have ever seen".

The Constitutional Court subsequently appointed retired judge Bernard Ngoepe to conduct an official inquiry into Dlamini's personal role and conduct in the crisis. In May 2018 – by which time Dlamini had left the Social Development portfolio – Ngoepe reported back to the court that Dlamini's conduct as Minister had been "reckless" and "grossly negligent". In September of that year, on the basis of Ngoepe's report, the court ruled unanimously that part of the responsibility for the grants crisis was due to Dlamini, who had been personally negligent. She was served with a personal cost order and instructed to pay 20% of the legal costs in the case that had been brought earlier by Black Sash. The Ngoepe inquiry and related Constitutional Court finding also led ultimately to Dlamini's criminal conviction on a charge of perjury.

==== Absenteeism ====
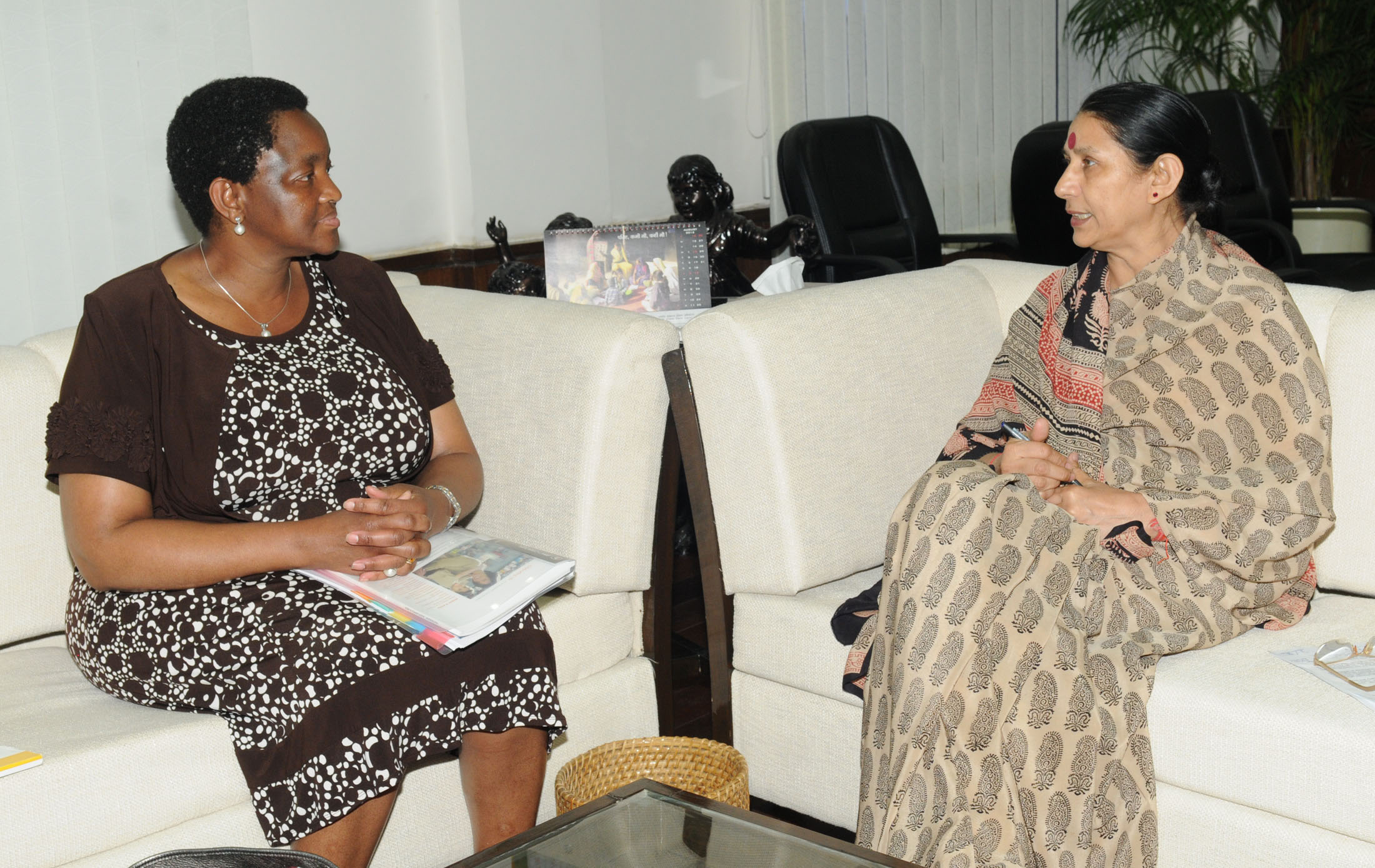
Dlamini in New Delhi with her Indian counterpart, Krishna Tirath, on 23 August 2012

During and after the grants crisis, Dlamini was harshly criticised by other Members of Parliament, including in the ANC caucus, for her non-attendance at meetings of parliamentary committees which sought to probe the crisis. Her attendance had been very good in 2016 but between January and May 2017 both she and her Deputy Minister missed six of nine committee meetings at which their presence had been expected. Among other meetings in 2017, Dlamini failed to appear at a Standing Committee on Public Accounts meeting about SASSA's poor audit performance and plans for the grants switchover, and later she failed to appear at two separate meetings about her Department's 2017/2018 annual budget and performance plan.

=== President of the ANC Women's League: 2015–2022 ===
In the early hours of 8 August 2015, at the ANCWL's national elective conference in Pretoria, Dlamini was elected ANCWL President. She beat Basic Education Minister Angie Motshekga, who was running for re-election, with 1,537 votes to Motshekga's 1,081. Dlamini was also re-elected to the mainstream ANC's National Executive Committee at the party's 53rd National Conference in December 2012 and again at its 54th National Conference in December 2017.

During Dlamini's tenure as league president, the ANCWL became known as an outspoken supporter of controversial President Zuma. In 2016, Dlamini famously told the SABC that senior ANC members should hesitate to discuss publicly allegations of state capture under Zuma's administration, because "All of us in the NEC [ANC National Executive Committee] have our smallanyana ["tiny little"] skeletons and we don't want to take out skeletons because all hell will break loose". Ahead of the ANC's 54th National Conference in 2017, Dlamini supported Zuma's unsuccessful campaign to have Nkosazana Dlamini-Zuma elected as his successor.

Dlamini remained ANCWL President until 2022, despite having been elected for what was, in terms of the league's constitution, a five-year term. In April 2022, shortly after Dlamini's criminal conviction, the ANC National Executive Committee announced that it would disband the national executive of the ANCWL because the leaders had exceeded their terms. The disbandment ended Dlamini and other national leaders' terms, and leadership of the ANCWL was entrusted to an interim task team, pending fresh leadership elections; Dlamini was not appointed to the task team.

Dlamini attempted to stage a political comeback in July 2023 as the Women's League held its first elective conference since 2015. Her ambitions were dashed when it was revealed that she had received the fewest nominations for the position of president of the Women's League; she had only managed to secure 258 branch nominations, far behind her competitors Sisisi Tolashe and Thembeka Mchunu, who received 1,564 and 796 nominations, respectively. On 23 July 2023, Tolashe was announced as the new president of the Women's League, defeating Mchunu and Dlamini by a huge margin; Dlamini had received the fewest votes from delegates for the position, finishing last with 170 votes while Mchunu and Tolashe received 1,038 and 1,729 votes, respectively.

=== Ministry of Women: 2018–2019 ===
In late February 2018, Zuma resigned as national President and his successor, Cyril Ramaphosa, appointed Dlamini to his cabinet as Minister for Women, in which capacity she was technically a Minister in the Presidency. She held that portfolio until 25 May 2019, when, following the 2019 general election, she was removed from Ramaphosa's cabinet. She was re-elected to her seat in Parliament, having been ranked 14th on the ANC's party list, but she resigned shortly after the election in June 2019.

== Perjury ==
The 2018 report of the Ngoepe inquiry into the social grants crisis suggested that Dlamini had been dishonest, as well as negligent, during the crisis. Ngoepe reported to the Constitutional Court that, during the inquiry, Dlamini had been highly evasive and had made statements which were contradicted by other evidence. In particular, other witnesses, and a copy of a letter written by Dlamini in 2017, strongly suggested that Dlamini had been closely involved in setting up parallel "work streams" which reported directly to her as minister and which trenched on SASSA's functions, undermining the agency's efficacy. Dlamini denied this, and Ngoepe suggested that her denial was false and self-serving.

In its September 2018 judgement, the Constitutional Court concurred with Ngoepe that Dlamini had provided false or misleading evidence under oath, and it referred Ngoepe's report to the National Prosecuting Authority, which it recommended should investigate Dlamini on a possible criminal perjury charge. DA politician Bridget Masango laid a formal complaint with the Public Protector, alleging that Dlamini had lied to Parliament in May 2016 when she assured the National Assembly that SASSA would be able to take over social grants payments from April 2017; the Public Protector, Busisiwe Mkhwebane, reported in 2019 that she could not "substantiate" Masango's claim that Dlamini's promise had violated the Executive Ethics Code.

=== Conviction ===
However, Dlamini was indeed charged with perjury and made her first appearance in the Johannesburg magistrate's court on 1 September 2021. She was convicted of perjury on 9 March 2022. The court found that she had "knowingly and intentionally disposed of false evidence" in claiming that she did not oversee the relevant parallel work streams. Taking into account Dlamini's 2006 conviction on another offence associated with dishonesty, the court sentenced her to serve four years' imprisonment, with two years suspended, or pay a fine of R200,000; she opted to pay the fine.

=== ANC response ===
Dlamini's conviction led to some controversy on the question of whether the ANC's so-called step-aside rule required Dlamini to step down as ANCWL President. The ANC National Executive Committee decided that she was not personally required to step aside, though it announced that decision while disbanding the entire ANCWL executive. However, in December 2022, the ANC's Electoral Committee, chaired by Kgalema Motlanthe, informed Dlamini that, because she had been convicted of a "serious crime", she was ineligible to stand for any ANC leadership position during the internal elections scheduled for the party's 55th National Conference. Until then, it had been highly likely that Dlamini would be re-elected to the ANC National Executive Committee – the nominations process suggested that she was ranked 15th by popularity among all candidates nominated for election to the 80-member body. In an unsuccessful application to have the decision appealed internally, Dlamini stated her intention to take the party to court to have the decision reversed.

== Personal life ==
Dlamini is a single mother.
