= Sisisi Tolashe =

South African politician (born 1959)

The Honourable Sisisi Tolashe MP

Minister of Social Development
- In office 3 July 2024 – 14 May 2026
- President: Cyril Ramaphosa
- Deputy: Ganief Hendricks
- Preceded by: Lindiwe Zulu
- Succeeded by: Dina Pule

President of the African National Congress Women's League
- Incumbent
- Assumed office 23 July 2023
- President: Cyril Ramaphosa
- Deputy: Lungi Mnganga-Gcabashe
- Preceded by: Bathabile Dlamini

Deputy Minister in the Presidency for Women, Youth and Persons with Disabilities
- In office 6 March 2023 – 19 June 2024
- President: Cyril Ramaphosa
- Minister: Nkosazana Dlamini-Zuma
- Preceded by: Hlengiwe Mkhize
- Succeeded by: Steve Letsike

Member of the National Assembly
- Incumbent
- Assumed office 22 May 2019
- In office 5 September 2016 – 25 February 2018
Prior offices 2001–2019
Executive Mayor of Enoch Mgijima
In office 26 February 2018 – May 2019
Preceded by	Lindiwe Gunuza-Nkwentsha
Succeeded by	Sibusiso Mvana
Secretary-General of the African National Congress Women's League
In office 6 July 2008 – August 2015
President	Angie Motshekga
Deputy	Mpai Mogori
Preceded by	Bathabile Dlamini
Succeeded by	Meokgo Matuba
Member of the Eastern Cape Provincial Legislature
In office 29 January 2001 – 2008

Personal details
- Born: 21 December 1959 (age 66) Queenstown, Cape Province; Union of South Africa
- Party: African National Congress

Nokuzola Gladys Tolashe (born 21 December 1959), also known as Sisisi "Sisi" Tolashe, is a South African politician from the Eastern Cape. A member of the African National Congress (ANC), she was the Minister of Social Development from June 2024 until May 2026 and the president of the ANC Women's League since July 2023.

Tolashe was a member of the Eastern Cape Provincial Legislature between 2001 and 2008, and she rose to national political prominence as the secretary-general of the ANC Women's League under President Angie Motshekga. She was secretary-general from July 2008 until she was ousted in August 2015. She went on to serve as a backbencher in the National Assembly from 2016 to 2018 and then as mayor of the Eastern Cape's Enoch Mgijima Local Municipality from 2018 to 2019. She returned to the National Assembly in the 2019 general election and was appointed to the national executive by President Cyril Ramaphosa in March 2023, first as Deputy Minister in the Presidency for Women, Youth and Persons with Disabilities and then, after the 2024 general election, as Minister of Social Development.

Tolashe has been a member of the ANC National Executive Committee since December 2022, and she previously served in the committee between 2007 and 2017.

== Early life and activism ==
Tolashe was born on 21 December 1959 in Queenstown in the former Cape Province. She entered politics through youth organisations in the anti-apartheid movement and served in various civic organisations under the United Democratic Front. In the 1980s, she was detained without trial for five years – three years under Section 29 of the Internal Security Act, and two years under the prevailing state of emergency regulations.

== Eastern Cape Provincial Legislature: 2001–2008 ==
On 29 January 2001, Tolashe was sworn in to the Eastern Cape Provincial Legislature, where she filled a casual vacancy in the caucus of her political party, the African National Congress (ANC). She served in the provincial legislature until 2008.

During her tenure, in December 2007, Tolashe attended the mainstream ANC's 52nd National Conference, where she was elected to a five-year term as a member of the ANC National Executive Committee. Her candidacy had been endorsed by the Congress of South African Trade Unions, and she received 1,574 votes from the roughly 4,000 delegates at the conference, making her the 59th-most popular candidate of the 80 ordinary members elected to the committee.

== ANCWL Secretary-General: 2008–2015 ==
Her departure from the legislature followed her election as national Secretary-General of the ANC Women's League (ANCWL), a full-time position based out of Luthuli House. She was elected to that office on 6 July 2008 at a league conference in Bloemfontein. She succeeded Bathabile Dlamini who, at the same conference, was beaten by Angie Motshekga in the race for the ANCWL presidency. Mpai Mogori was elected as Tolashe's deputy.

At the ANC's 53rd National Conference in December 2012, Tolashe was re-elected to the ANC National Executive Committee, ranked 56th with 1,715 votes from 4,500 delegates. After the conference, the ANCWL was criticised for failing to field women candidates for the top leadership positions. In October 2013, Tolashe said that the mainstream ANC would have a woman president "in time", and that, though the time had not yet arrived, "I think we are almost there now."

Both Motshekga and Tolashe were voted out of the ANCWL leadership at the league's next elective conference, held in August 2015 after a long delay. Meokgo Matuba won the Secretary-General position, beating Tolashe by 348 votes.

== Return to government ==
=== National Assembly: 2016–2018 ===
On 5 September 2016, Tolashe was sworn in to an ANC seat in the National Assembly, the lower house of the South African Parliament. She replaced Raesibe Nyalungu, who died. She was a member of the Portfolio Committee on Communications and Digital Technologies and an alternate member of the Portfolio Committees on Labour and Agriculture, Forestry and Fisheries. Concurrently, she continued to serve in the ANC National Executive Committee – and apparently remained a supporter of ANC President Jacob Zuma – until the party's 54th National Conference in December 2017, at which she failed to gain re-election.

Tolashe's term in the National Assembly lasted less than two years: she resigned on 25 February 2018, ceding her seat to Daniel Jabu Kabini.

=== Mayor of Enoch Mgijma: 2018–2019 ===
Tolashe left Parliament to accept election as Executive Mayor of the Enoch Mgijima Local Municipality, her hometown in the Eastern Cape. She was elected on 26 February, replacing the embattled Lindiwe Gunuza-Nkwentsha as part of an ANC campaign to stabilise mismanaged municipalities.

Her tenure in the mayoral office was brief. In the 2019 general election, she was nominated to return to the National Assembly, ranked 11th on the ANC's regional party list for the Eastern Cape constituency. After the election, Sibusiso Mvana succeeded her as mayor.

=== Return to the National Assembly: 2019–present ===
Upon her return to Parliament, Tolashe was appointed as a member of the Portfolio Committee on Transport and the Standing Committee on Public Accounts. In addition, on 24 June 2020, she was elected unopposed to chair the ad hoc parliamentary committee tasked with finding a successor to Kimi Makwetu, the Auditor-General of South Africa. The committee concluded its work in October, unanimously recommending Tsakani Maluleke for the position. In 2021, Tolashe was appointed as a member of another ad hoc committee, the Committee for Section 194 Enquiry into the Public Protector.

In May 2022, Tolashe was elected to the 30-member Provincial Executive Committee of the Eastern Cape branch of the ANC. In December, the ANC's 55th National Conference elected her to return to the National Executive Committee; she was elected narrowly, ranked 77th of 80 members with 973 votes from the 4,400 delegates. At the conference, she reportedly supported Cyril Ramaphosa's bid for re-election as ANC President; she was linked politically to Oscar Mabuyane and his allies in the Eastern Cape, a group sometimes nicknamed the Chris Hani Cabal.

==== Deputy Minister in the Presidency ====
On 6 March 2023, President Ramaphosa announced a cabinet reshuffle in which Tolashe was appointed as Deputy Minister in the Presidency for Women, Youth and Persons with Disabilities. She deputised Minister Nkosazana Dlamini-Zuma, who was also newly appointed to the portfolio.

==== ANC Women's League presidency ====
In July 2023, the ANCWL held its first elective conference since the 2015 meeting at which Tolashe had been voted out of the leadership. Tolashe was viewed as a frontrunner for election to the league's presidency, running with the support of Ramaphosa and his allies, including Pemmy Majodina and Angie Motshekga. Her slate of running mates included Lungi Gcabashe, Nokuthula Nqaba, and, until her death, Tina Joemat-Pettersson. She stood against Bathabile Dlamini, the outgoing ANCWL President, and Thembeka Mchunu ultimately emerged as another pro-Ramaphosa candidate.

At the conference held from 21 to 23 July 2023, Tolashe had the most branch nominations for the president position; she had received 1,564 nominations while her competitors Mchunu and Dlamini received 796 and 258 nominations respectively. On the final day of the conference, Tolashe was announced as the league's new president, having received 1,729 votes while Mchunu and Dlamini got 1,038 and 170 votes respectively.

==== Minister of Social Development ====
After the 2024 general election, President Ramaphosa appointed Tolashe as Minister of Social Development.

==== Corruption allegations ====
In April 2026, Tolashe was called before the ANC's Integrity Commission following allegations that she took two luxury SUVs, donated to the ANCWL by Chinese officials, and gave them to her adult children.

Tolashe was subsequently fired by President Cyril Ramaphosa in terms of section 91(2) of the South African constitution.
