= Lisa Mangcu =

South African politician (born 1965)

Deputy Minister of Transport
- In office 7 March 2023 – 28 May 2024
- President: Cyril Ramaphosa
- Minister: Sindy Chikunga
- Preceded by: Sindy Chikunga
- Succeeded by: Mkhuleko Hlengwa

Member of the National Assembly

Assembly Member for Gauteng
- In office 22 May 2019 – 28 May 2024

Personal details
- Born: Lisa Nkosinathi Mangcu; 8 June 1965 (age 60)
- Citizenship: South African
- Party: African National Congress

Lisa Nkosinathi Mangcu (born 8 June 1965) is a South African politician who served as Deputy Minister of Transport between March 2023 and May 2024. He represented the African National Congress (ANC) in the National Assembly during the Sixth Parliament from May 2019 to May 2024.

== Early life and career ==
Mangcu was born on 8 June 1965. He was a traffic officer in the Eastern Cape in the late 1980s. By that time, he was politically active in the anti-apartheid movement, having become involved in student activism and later in the underground activities of Umkhonto we Sizwe. He later became active in the National Education, Health and Allied Workers' Union.

He worked for the national Department of Transport from 1998 to 2004, when he left to join the provincial department of transport in Mpumalanga. Thereafter he worked for the City of Tshwane Metropolitan Municipality, becoming deputy city manager in 2010. In 2016 he was the acting city manager in Tshwane after the incumbent city manager, Jason Ngobeni, resigned.

== Career in government ==
In the May 2019 general election, Mangcu was elected to represent the African National Congress (ANC) in the National Assembly, the lower house of the South African Parliament. He represented the Gauteng constituency, having been ranked 20th on the ANC's regional party list in that province. In Parliament, he was a member of the Portfolio Committee on Transport and an alternate member of the Portfolio Committee on Small Business Development. Between late 2022 and March 2023, he was the acting chairperson of the transport committee after the elected chairperson, Mosebenzi Zwane, stepped aside to address misconduct allegations against him.

On 6 March 2023, President Cyril Ramaphosa announced a cabinet reshuffle in which Mangcu was promoted to become Deputy Minister of Transport. He replaced Sindy Chikunga, who had been promoted to become Minister of Transport in the same reshuffle. He was sworn in to the office on 7 March. He served as deputy minister for 15 months, during which time he was also head of the ANC's constituency office in Soshanguve, Gauteng. In the next general election in May 2024, Mangcu stood for re-election, ranked 84th on the ANC's national party list, but he was not returned to the National Assembly.

== Personal life ==
Mangcu is Christian.
