= South African Social Security Agency =

Agency of the South African government

Coordinates: 25.74691°S 28.20438°E

- List: 10 other official names: Suid-Afrikaanse Agentskap vir Maatskaplike Sekerheid (Afrikaans); I-Ejensi yezeHlalakuhle yeSewula Afrika (Southern Ndebele); I-Arhente yoKhuseleko lwezeNtlalo yaseMzantsi Afrika (Xhosa); I-Ejensi Yezokuphepha Komphakathi yaseNingizimu Afrika (Zulu); I-Ejensi Yekuvikeleka Kwetenhlalakahle YaseNingizimu Afrika (Swazi); Setheo sa Tšhireletšo ya Leago sa Afrika Borwa (Northern Sotho); Setheo sa Tšireletso ea Sechaba sa Afrika Boroa (Sotho); Setheo sa Tshireletso ya Loago sa Aforikaborwa (Tswana); Ejensi ya Nsirhelelo wa Vanhu ya Afrika-Dzonga (Tsonga); Zhendedzi ḽa Tsireledzo ya Matshilisano ḽa Afrika Tshipembe (Venda)

Agency overview
- Formed: April 2005; 21 years ago
- Jurisdiction: South Africa
- Headquarters: SASSA House, 501 Prodinsa Building, Cnr Steve Biko and Pretorius Street, Pretoria
- Employees: 7,492 (2024)
- Annual budget: R 49.44 billion (2026/27)
- Minister responsible: Dina Pule, Minister of Social Development
- Agency executive: Themba Matlou, Chief Executive Officer
- Parent department: Department of Social Development
- Website: www.sassa.gov.za

The South African Social Security Agency (SASSA) is a national agency of the South African government created in April 2005 to administer South Africa's social security system, including by distributing social grants, on behalf of the Department of Social Development (DSD). It is under the oversight, but not the operational control, of DSD and the Ministry of Social Development. Established in terms of the Social Assistance Act of 2004 and South African Social Security Agency Act of 2004, SASSA is a public entity in terms of Schedule 3A of the Public Finance Management Act. As of 2022 its chief executive officer was Busisiwe Memela-Khambula.

SASSA was founded in 2005 to centralise the provision of social security assistance, formerly a primarily provincial function, in order to reduce corruption and improve service delivery. It was closely modelled on its Australian counterpart, Centrelink. Its key functions relate to the administration and payment of social grants, which support a large proportion of the South African population: in 2022, 46% of South Africans received a social grant. SASSA's functions including processing applications for social security assistance, verifying and approving applications, disbursing and paying the grants to eligible beneficiaries, and preventing and detecting fraud. SASSA employs biometric technology, including fingerprint and facial recognition, to verify the identity of beneficiaries. This helps ensure that the grants reach the intended recipients and reduce the risk of identity theft and fraud.

== Types of grants ==
The social assistance disbursed by SASSA takes the form of various grants; most of them are means-tested and paid in cash on a monthly basis. These are the Child Support Grant, the Care Dependency Grant, the Foster Child Grant, the Disability Grant, the Grant-in-Aid, the Older Person's Grant (an old-age pension), and the War Veteran's Grant. A special case is the three-month Social Relief of Distress Grant, which provides immediate temporary assistance in the form of vouchers, food parcels, or cash. The temporary COVID-19 Social Relief of Distress grant was introduced in May 2020 during the COVID-19 pandemic; in October 2022, Enoch Godongwana, the Minister of Finance, announced that it would be extended to remain in place until March 2024.

In 2015, of the R155.3 billion given in social welfare, R53.5 billion went to pensioners, R47.8 billion to Child Support Grants, R20.2 billion to Disability Grants, and R8.5 billion for other grants, with the remainder spent on management and administration.

SASSA announced that all grants would be increased from 1 April 2023. The Older Persons Grant will be increased to R2080 (for recipients between 60 and 74) and R2100 (for recipients over 75 years old).

Recipients of the Disability Grant and the Care Dependency Grant will be increased to R2080, while the Child Support Grant will be increased to R500 (with the top-up increasing to R250).

The Foster Child grant will increase to R1120, with the War Veteran grant increasing to R2100 and lastly, the Grant-In-Aid increasing to R500.

Further SASSA Grants Payment has been increased from 1 October 2023.

The SRD Grant remains at R350 and is being extended until 31 March 2024.

SASSA R350 grant is designed to help unemployed South African between the age of 18–59 years with no source of income.

SASSA aims to eliminate long queues at its local offices across the country, so that beneficiaries can check payment dates and application status online, SASSA ensures smooth experience when applying for their Social Grants.

== Operation ==
In January 2012, Cash Paymaster Services (CPS), a subsidiary of Net1 UEPS Technologies, was awarded a five-year, R10 billion tender to distribute social grants on behalf of SASSA from February 2012. A rival bidder, AllPay, challenged the procurement process in court; in 2014, in AllPay v CEO of SASSA, the Constitutional Court found that irregular processes had been followed, and consequently declared the tender invalid, but suspended the order in order not to interrupt grant payments, and to allow SASSA an opportunity to initiate a new tender process.

Each month, the National Treasury deposits the total amount to be paid out into a Nedbank trust account. Interest earned during this period goes to the state. All beneficiary accounts are held at Grindrod Bank.

A grant recipient can withdraw their grant from any SASSA paypoint across the country, which carries no withdrawal charge, and which Net1 CEO Serge Belamont claims is more secure because of the biometric security checks on fingerprints; or from designated retailers such as Pick n Pay, which work with EasyPay, another company owned by Net1, to allow these withdrawals; or from ATMs.

Moneyline, another Net1 company, provides loans to grant recipients. Umoya Manje, also another company owned by Net1, allows grant beneficiaries to buy cellphone airtime on credit.

== Grants crisis ==
In December 2014, a ministerial task team concluded that SASSA itself should take over the paying out of grants. In 2015, SASSA issued a new tender but did not award it, opting instead to insource the disbursement of grants by 2017.

In the 2015/2016 financial year, SASSA recorded additional, irregular expenditure on the CPS contract for the re-registration of grant beneficiaries because legal requirements had been circumvented.

The then Finance Minister, Pravin Gordhan advised the Minister of Social Development Bathabile Dlamini to award a new contract to commercial South African banks and the South African Post Office (SAPO), and forego biometric identification, which contract requirement disadvantaged others bidders against CPS. However, this proposal was rejected on the grounds that the biometric system had eliminated fraudulent claims amounting to R2 billion annually; that further work to remove duplicate entries could save another R2 billion annually; and that SAPO did not have a banking licence, nor enough post offices to properly distribute grants. Dlamini expressed a desire to remain with CPS until SASSA was capable to take over, reasoning that this posed the least risk of SASSA defaulting on grant payments. She claimed that the process to distribute grants through SASSA was well underway, insisting that the department was halfway through a four-phase plan which would culminate in 2019 with the handing over of the responsibility to SASSA.

Dlamini claimed in 2017 that she had only become aware in October 2016 that SASSA was likely to be unable to take over grants payments from April 2017.

SASSA estimated it would pay CPS about R3.5 billion annually under a renewed contract, between 52% and 59% more than it already did. SASSA later denied that it had done such estimation, and then claimed that it was a simple inflation-related adjustment, which was not true.

Dlamini had been advised in October 2016 that the DSD was obliged to engage in competitive tendering, and could therefore not sign a contract with CPS; she was informed that the grants crisis was also not a justification to continue using CPS, since the emergency had been self-created; and she also received a legal opinion from senior counsel Wim Trengove that the extant CPS contract could not be legally extended since it had already been ruled invalid by the Constitutional Court.

In December 2016, SASSA was also advised to inform the Constitutional Court of its predicament, "that it faced the highly irregular prospect of going into contract for another year with [CPS]". The Agency waited until 28 February 2017 to lodge a plea, which it immediately withdrew the next day, using a letter dated the previous day.

In February 2017, SASSA told Parliament's social development portfolio committee it had come up short in attempts to find working solutions to pay social grants, and claimed that the only way to make social grant payments from April was to stick with the service provider whose contract had been declared invalid.

SASSA's Zodwa Mvulane told Parliament in March 2017 that they "only had a year, from September 2015, to prepare for being a paymaster". However, SASSA only began preparations in December, and it had until then been ignored for years. While SASSA told Parliament it had not had enough time, it had also claimed before the Constitutional Court that it would not need CPS a year after the 2017/2018 financial year—contradicting a letter by Dlamini, sent on 2 February, that stated CPS would no longer be needed at the end of 2019, and another letter sent a week later by SASSA chief executive Thokozani Magwaza, which claimed that the contract with CPS would only last until November 2018—both longer than a year.

The Black Sash Trust, through representation by the Centre for Applied Legal Studies, launched an application to the Constitutional Court, asking it to compel Dlamini and SASSA to take necessary measures to ensure the social grants system and its beneficiaries were protected when the CPS contract ended on 31 March. On 6 March 2017, the contract with Cash Paymaster Services was renewed, and the Constitutional Court's order of invalidity with regard to that contract again suspended, for another year. The Court held that no party had "any claim to profit from the threatened invasion of people's rights" but also understood that CPS could not be expected to deliver grants at a loss; it therefore ordered CPS to continue to deliver social grants at the same price it had contracted for in 2012.

The Constitutional Court found that "the responsible functionaries of SASSA" had been aware from April 2016 that they could not comply with their undertaking to the Court previously that they would be able to pay social grants from 1 April 2017. The Constitutional Court held Dlamini primarily responsible for the crisis, with Chief Justice Mogoeng Mogoeng saying there was no explanation for the incompetence displayed by her and SASSA. According to constitutional scholar Pierre de Vos, the Constitutional Court had concluded that SASSA and Dlamini could not be trusted to do their constitutionally mandated job to ensure delivery of social grants, and could not be trusted not to lie to the courts in the future.

Between 2013 and 2017, the DSD spent R30 million on the costs of legal appeals involving SASSA.

== Unauthorised deductions ==
In 2004, the DSD amended the Social Assistance Act in order to disallow anyone other than the beneficiary to deduct money from their account.

However, 10,262 complaints about deductions were made between April 2015 and March 2016, and the DSD itself claimed "for the past two to three years" to have been fighting illegal deductions from social grants. Many of the unauthorised deductions were claimed by CPS to be repayment of non-existent Moneyline loans, and sales of airtime and electricity.

In June 2016, SASSA, the Black Sash, and the Association of Community Advice Office (ACAOSA) laid criminal charges against the directors of CPS and Grindrod Bank, claiming that the two companies were not implementing amended regulations under the Social Assistance Act, which amendments compelled companies not to deduct money from social grant beneficiary accounts for financial services. The criminal charges were frozen until October, when Net1 was to receive clarity from a High Court as to regulations. In a founding affidavit lodged with the North Gauteng High Court, Black Sash asked the court to ring-fence social grant accounts in order to protect grant beneficiaries from exploitation or abuse, and to prevent companies from soliciting beneficiaries around SASSA paypoints—practices which Black Sash and the DSD accused Net1 and its subsidiaries of encouraging.

== Mass Fraud Allegations ==
In October 2024, 2 Stellenbosch University students came forward claiming that there was mass fraud among the youths ID numbers which were being used to collect SASSA SRD R370 grants.

In a on campus random survey of 60 people, 56 people were found to have fraudulent SASSA SRD applications. They further stated that they tested all possible ID numbers of people born in February 2005 and that there was a 91% application rate, far exceeding the current youth unemployment rate of 60%.

In Parliament, the minister of Social Development gave SASSA 30 days to investigate this matter.
