= Lindiwe Gunuza-Nkwentsha =

South African politician

Lindiwe Gunuza-Nkwentsha MPL

Member of the Eastern Cape Provincial Legislature
- Incumbent
- Assumed office 14 June 2024

Executive Mayor of the Enoch Mgijima Local Municipality
- In office 26 August 2016 – February 2018
- Preceded by: Office established
- Succeeded by: Sisisi Tolashe

Personal details
- Party: African National Congress

Lindiwe Gunuza‐Nkwentsha is a South African politician who is a member of the Eastern Cape Provincial Legislature representing the African National Congress. She was elected in the 2024 provincial election. She chairs the portfolio committee on social development in the legislature.

Gunuza‐Nkwentsha formerly served as the chief whip of the Chris Hani District Municipality before she was elected mayor of the Enoch Mgijima Local Municipality in the aftermath of the 2016 municipal elections. She served as mayor until early-February 2018 when she resigned after she was found to have brought the ANC into disrepute; she was also found guilty of stealing a cow from a municipal pound by the ANC's Provincial Working Committee and ordered to pay compensation.
