= Continuing mandamus =

Structural interdicts

Continuing mandamus, structural interdict, or structural injunction is a relief given by a court of law through a series of ongoing orders over a long period of time, directing an authority to do its duty or fulfill an obligation in general public interest, as and when a need arises over the duration a case lies with the court, with the court choosing not to dispose the case off in finality. This happens in a situation which cannot be remedied instantaneously but requires a solution over a long time, at times going on for years. With this procedural innovation of the writ of mandamus or a mandatory order, the court monitors compliance of its orders, seeking periodic reports from authorities on the progress in implementing them.

It may enlist senior advocates to assist it as amicus curiae in court, or as court commissioners in the field, and subject experts or expert bodies to report back to it on the facts and ground-realities of the case. It may appoint a court committee or a court commission, independent from the executive, as its oversight or monitoring agency. It may require the subject-matter covered by the case, be taught in schools and universities, making it part of textbooks and syllabi, or be given wide publicity through the media. It may use contempt against people in positions of power or authority as a remedy in case of non-compliance or poor implementation of its orders. It may recommend that the legislature frame a policy in the matter, for the future.

== India ==
The doctrine of continuing mandamus, first propounded in a case in the late 1970s, has been discussed and dealt with in the respective cases of Vineet Narain v. Union of India and Bandhua Mukti Morcha v. Union of India & Ors. It has been applied to cleaning the air around the Taj Mahal and the waters of the Ganga, and to mitigate travel conditions in commuter trains and road surface, traffic & vehicle conditions, in cities. As it essentially seeks to directly control the bureaucracy, bypassing the political regime, it has met with both, gradual success and stiff resistance, in India.

If a case, prima facie, cannot be made out against an accused in a charge sheet, it is to be closed and quickly submitted to the court. The courts are not concerned with the accusations on merit, in such cases, but merely whether the agencies have investigated them expeditiously, and to their logical conclusion.

== Philippines ==
The Manila Bay Case led to the formal placement of the procedural innovation of continuing mandamus in statute books in the Philippines, where it is being resorted to by litigants in other cases.

== South Africa ==
The Constitutional Court of South Africa in 2002, recognised the need for structural interdicts in their supervisory jurisdiction, where declaratory orders go unheeded. This need should be coupled with a meaningful engagement of all the parties to the litigation in securing socio-economic rights.

== Canada ==
Courts would give time to authorities for compliance, by suspending or delaying declarations of invalidity. In 2003, the Supreme Court of Canada in Doucet-Boudreau v Nova Scotia (Minister of Education) held that, in constitutional cases a court could keep the final outcome in a case pending in a post-judgment supervisory jurisdiction, and would not become functus officio.

== United States ==
Structural injunction, formulated possibly first by American courts, has been applied to try remedy schools, prisons, environmental cleanup and traditional rights of indigenous people.
