= Maria Rantho =

South African politician

Maria Rantho (1953 – July 12, 2002) was a South African disability rights activist and politician. She was the first wheelchair user elected to the National Assembly of South Africa.

== Career ==
Rantho was working as a nurse when she survived a spinal injury in an automobile accident; she used a wheelchair afterwards. She co-founded and became chair of Disabled People South Africa, worked for the formation of the Disabled Women's Development Programme, and was a member of the African National Congress Women's League. In the restructuring of South Africa after apartheid, she was responsible for the disability desk in the Deputy President's office; her projects were later formalized as the Office on the Status of Disabled Persons.

In 1994, Rantho was elected to the National Assembly of South Africa, the first disabled member of that body. She was part of the team that drafted the disability policy passed by the South African government in 1997. She left Parliament in 1998 and worked at the Public Service Commission afterwards, until her death.

She was deputy chair of Disabled Peoples' International, and in that role made a presentation to the United Nations' Fourth World Conference on Women, held in Beijing in 1995:

...a disability can be endured, but the lack of human rights, the marginalization and exclusion, the deprivation of equal opportunities and the institutional discrimination that girls and women with disabilities are facing, cannot be endured, and can no longer be tolerated.

== Personal life and legacy ==
Rantho died suddenly in 2002, at Pretoria. She was survived by a son, Mpho.

The Maria Rantho Clinic in Soshanguve township near Pretoria is named for Rantho, and focuses on HIV/AIDS treatment, mental health, nutrition, and family planning.

Filmmaker Shelley Barry ends her film "Taxi Wars" (2007) with a dedication to Rantho: "Dedicated to the spirit of South African activist Maria Rantho and to all comrades who still wheel the earth continuing their fight for our liberation."
