= QuadPara Association of South Africa =

South African Non-profit Organisation

QASA logo

The QuadPara Association of South Africa (QASA) was established in 1978 as a non-profit organisation which strives to prevent spinal cord injury through high-profile information campaigns, as well as to protect and promote the interests of people with mobility impairments through lobbying and advocacy.

== Aims ==
QASA's main aims involve "co-ordinating, policy-making, governing and supporting" in all areas of disability in South Africa. Its motto is: Developing the full potential of quadriplegics and paraplegics. The association also lobbies and advises on pressing issues such as the accessibility of South Africa's first bus rapid transit system (BRT). QASA's National Director Ari Seirlis was at the forefront of protests against the inaccessibility of stadia for the 2010 FIFA World Cup.

The association aims to become one of the first charitable entities to be self-sustaining in terms of funding and actively seeks economically beneficial opportunities. For instance, a recent initiative supported by South Africa's biggest supermarket chain Pick n Pay has allowed QASA to acquire its own profit-making supermarket franchise.

== Projects and campaigns ==
=== Major ongoing projects ===
QASA's ongoing projects include:

- Digital Villages. Three computer centres in KwaZulu-Natal, Pretoria and Soweto provide IT training and employment support. The centres are sponsored by Microsoft.
- Bags of Hope. Free bags are distributed to people leaving hospital after sustaining spinal cord injuries, with useful information and products. The project is in association with Coloplast.
- Education and Employment Support. QASA facilitates learnerships and helps promote small businesses owned by its members. QASA operate a database of members' CVs and help to place people with disabilities in organisations nationwide.
- Self Help Centres. There are 15 self-help/independent living centres around South Africa, run by QASA's regional affiliations.

=== Major campaigns ===
- Buckle Up – We Don't Want New Members. Road safety campaign aimed at getting motorists to use their seatbelts. The campaign has won the South African Guild of Motoring Journalists 'Road Safety Project of the Year' award for its attention-grabbing tactics, which include having disabled people posted at petrol stations all over South Africa warning motorists to use their seat belts.
- Diving Prevention Program. QASA produced a DVD warning of the dangers of diving, a major cause of spinal cord injury. A 30-second clip of the DVD was shown as an advert on South Africa's national E.TV channel.

=== Annual events ===
- SABAT Wheelchair Race. Powered wheelchair race over a 1 km circuit, sponsored by SABAT Batteries, which help provide wheelchair batteries to QASA members.
- Quads 4 Quads. Off-road motorcycle race over a 1,000 km course from Johannesburg to Durban. In 2009 it raised over R1 million ($127,000).

== Rolling Inspiration magazine ==
Rolling Inspiration magazine is Africa's only glossy lifestyle magazine for people with mobility impairments. It is published by Word for Word Media and managed by QASA. The managing editor is QASA's National Director, Ari Seirlis.

The magazine contains articles on disability issues written by experts as well as entertaining features and competitions based on the experience of being disabled in South Africa.

It is published six times a year with a print run of 5,000.

== Partnerships and relationships ==
- South African Disability Alliance (SADA)
- National Council for Persons with Physical Disabilities in South Africa (NCPPDSA)
- Disabled People of South Africa (DPSA)
- Office on the Status of Disabled Persons (OSDP)
- Southern African Spinal Cord Association (SASCA)
- Chris Burger Petro Jackson Players Fund
- Christopher Reeve Paralysis Foundation
- Green Office
- The National Accessibility Portal
