= Zoë Modiga =

South African singer and songwriter

- Born: Palesa Nomthandazo Phumelele Modiga; Overport, Durban, KwaZulu-Natal
- Genres: Jazz
- Occupations: singer-songwriter
- Instruments: vocals, guitars, piano and clarinet
- Labels: Yelloëwax,BandaBanda Agency
- Website: www.zoemodiga.com

Palesa Nomthandazo Phumelele Modiga, professionally known as Zoë Modiga is a South African singer and songwriter. Modiga first gained recognition as contestant on The Voice South Africa 2016.

Modiga's second studio album Inganekwane (2020), debuted number one on the Apple Music World Chart.

== Career ==
Palesa Nomthandazo Phumelele Modiga was born Overport, Durban and raised in Pietermaritzburg, KwaZulu-Natal, her musical interest began at the age of 10, singing for local music competition.

Modiga attended the National School of Arts in Johannesburg where she studied classical piano, clarinet and vocals.

From 2013 to 2015, Modiga enrolled College of Music, University of Cape Town in Jazz performance studies. That same year, Modiga won South African Music Rights Organisation's (SAMRO) Overseas Scholarships Competition for Jazz. Following year, she contested on The Voice South Africa and made it to the Top 8.

Her debut studio album Yellow: The Novel was released in 2017. The album was nominated Best African Artist Album and Best Jazz Album at the South African Music Awards.

On June 26, 2020, her second studio album Inganekwane was released. Inganekwane incorporates jazz composition, motown soul, and African storytelling. The album debuted number one on the Apple Music World Chart.

Modiga headlined to 14th Annual Mzansi Fela Festival, which was held in State Theatre, Gauteng in December 2021.

=== 2023-present: Nomthandazo, Cos Cos Tour ===
In September 14, Modiga announced her Cos Cos Yaphela Tour and her third studio album. The tour includes 3 dates that ran from September and concluded at The Star Theatre, Cape Town on October 20.

In November 2023, Modiga was honoured with Women of the Year title by Glamour.

In early April 2024, Modiga announced pre-save of her third studio album Nomthandazo.

The album was released on April 26, 2024.

In early June 2024, Zoë was announced as EQUAL Africa ambassador for June by Spotify.

In September, Modiga announce her Nzalabantu concert, was held at The Star Theatre, Cape Town on 4 October.

== Discography ==
- Yellow: The Novel (2017)
- Inganekwane (2020)
- nomthandazo (2024)
- The Vault (2026)

== Singles ==
=== As lead artist ===
List of singles as lead artist, with selected chart positions and certifications, showing year released and album name
Title	Year	Peak chart positions	Certifications	Album
Title	Year	ZA	Certifications	Album
"Lengoma"	2019	—		Non-album single
"Umdali"	2020	—		Non-album single
"Intsha"	2020	—		Inganekwane
"Umlolozelo"	2021	—		African Lullabies (Part 1)
"Ngelosi"	2024	—		nomthandazo
"amen"	2024	—		nomthandazo
"Something New"	2026	—		Non-album single
"—" denotes a recording that did not chart or was not released in that territory.

== Awards and nominations ==
Awards	Year	Prize	Results	Ref.
AFRIMMA	2021	Best Artiste, Duo or Group in African Jazz	Nominated	
Basadi in Music Awards	2022	AC Wines Jazz Artist of the Year	Nominated	
Glamour	2023	Women of the Year	Won	
Feather Awards	2024	Musician of the Year	Won	
Basadi in Music Awards	2025	Songwriter of the Year	Nominated	
South African Music Awards	2025	Best African Adult Contemporary Album	Nominated	
