= Social welfare programmes in South Africa =

Social welfare system in South Africa

South Africa has one of the most extensive social welfare systems among developing countries in the world. In 2019, an estimated 18 million people received some form of social grant provided by the government.

Social welfare programmes have a long history in South Africa. The earliest form of social welfare programme in South Africa is the poor relief distributed by the Dutch East India Company and the Dutch Reformed Church (DRC) in 1657. The institutionalised social welfare system was established after the British conquered the Dutch Cape Colony in 1806.

However, the social welfare system focused mainly on poor whites and excluded blacks. Under apartheid, the social welfare services for Africans, Indians and Coloreds were separated from that for whites. The allocation of social welfare resources favoured whites. The post-apartheid government launched the Reconstruction and Development Programme (RDP) in 1994 and published the White Paper for Social Welfare in 1997 to establish the framework of social welfare system in post-apartheid South Africa. They were aimed to address racial disparity in the delivery of social welfare services. Growth, Employment and Redistribution (GEAR) was launched in 1996 in response to the 1996 currency crisis. GEAR reduces government's spending, leading to the shrinkage of social grants. Social assistance, including grants and public works, is funded through tax revenue, unlike statutory and voluntary funds that are funded by employers and employees.

Social welfare programmes in South Africa include cash assistance, unemployment insurance, medical provisions, and housing subsidies. Cash assistance is distributed by the South African Social Security Agency on behalf of the Department of Social Development of South Africa (DSD). The cash assistance programmes that are currently available include the Child support Grant, the Foster child Grant, old-age pension, disability grant, care dependency grant, Social Relief of Distress R350/370 and war veterans grant.

There are both support and criticism regarding the social welfare programmes in South Africa. Supporters argue that grants such as the Child Support Grant and the old-age pension improve the nutrition status and school enrolment rates of poor children. However, critics points out corruption and maladministration in the social welfare system and the poor quality of RDP housing.

== History ==
=== Pre-apartheid ===
The pre-apartheid social programmes in South Africa was mainly concerned with white poverty. The earliest social welfare programmes in South Africa was the poor relief distributed by the Dutch East India Company and the Dutch Reformed Church (DRC) in 1657. The poor relief aimed at helping white farmers (Boers) whose crops failed and excluded Black farmers from the relief.

The institutionalised social welfare system was established after the British conquered the Dutch Cape Colony in 1806. The welfare resources for children and the disabled were created. The organised occupational insurance after retirement was established in the 1920s. However, the occupational insurance after retirement included mostly skilled workers, most of whom were white.

The labour movement organised by poor white industrial workers in the 1920s drew the government's attention to the poor white problem. The Department Of Labor was created to create work opportunities for white labours. The Wage Act in 1925 established a minimum wage for white labours, called "the white survival line," to protect white workers from poverty and ensure white privilege over non-white workers.

In 1937, a state Department of Social Welfare was established. The Department of Social Welfare was responsible for providing social welfare services to the public but its main focus was on poor whites.

=== Under apartheid ===
In the early 1950s, the social welfare services for African, Indian and Colored persons were separated from the Department of Social Welfare and transferred to the Departments of Bantu Administration, Indian Affairs and Colored Affairs, respectively. The separation of social welfare resources led to unequal allocation of resources based on race. The budget for welfare services for whites were higher than that for the majority blacks and the available grants for whites were more abundant than those for blacks.

Moreover, the way of the delivery of the services also reflected racial discrimination: the grants for whites, Indians, and Coloreds were distributed by check while the grants for Blacks were distributed at mobile sites, such as under trees and in stores.

Occupational retirement insurance was created in the 1920s. However, low skilled labour was not included in the insurance until the 1960s. In the 1960s and 1970s, occupational retirement insurance expanded rapidly to include many low skilled labour, many of whom were black. Meanwhile, trade union movement organised by white workers extended the coverage of occupational retirement insurance to more industries.

In the 1980s, in response to the growing protests against apartheid, the white minority government increased expenditure on social welfare services for black South Africans. According to economist Sampie Terreblanche, "by 1990 whites accounted for only 23% of welfare spending, whilst Coloureds and Indians received 24% and Africans 52%."

=== Post-apartheid ===
==== Reconstruction and Development Programme (RDP) ====
Reconstruction and Development Programme (RDP) was a South African socio-economic policy framework implemented by the African National Congress (ANC) government of Nelson Mandela in 1994 after months of discussions, consultations and negotiations between the ANC, its Alliance partners the Congress of South African Trade Unions and the South African Communist Party, and "mass organisations in the wider civil society".

The ANC's chief aim in developing and implementing the Reconstruction and Development Programme, was to address the immense socioeconomic problems brought about by apartheid. Specifically, it set its sights on alleviating poverty and addressing the massive shortfalls in social services across the country—something that the document acknowledged would rely upon a stronger macroeconomic environment.

Achieving poverty alleviation and a stronger economy were thus seen as deeply interrelated and mutually supporting objectives—development without growth would be financially unsustainable, while growth without development would fail to bring about the necessary structural transformation within South Africa's deeply inequitable and largely impoverished population.

Hence, the RDP attempted to combine measures to boost the economy such as contained fiscal spending, sustained or lowered taxes, reduction of government debt and trade liberalisation with socially minded social service provisions and infrastructural projects. In this way, the policy took on both socialist and neo-liberal elements—but could not be easily categorised wholly in either camp.

==== The White Paper for Social Welfare ====
The post-apartheid government published the White Paper for Social Welfare in 1995 and it was adopted by Cabinet in 1997. The White Paper proposed policies and programmes to implement the principles established in RDP. The programmes proposed by the White Paper included Unemployment Insurance, free health care programs for pregnant women and small children, free meals for students, and poor relief that would guarantee a minimum income for families and children. The White Paper also integrated the 14 welfare departments based on race and established the Ministry for Welfare and Population Development and nine provincial departments to administer social welfare services.

==== Growth, Employment and Redistribution (GEAR) ====
GEAR was the conservative macroeconomic policy South African government adopted in response to the 1996 currency crisis in an attempt to regain confidence in domestic and global capital market. GEAR prioritised economic growth, believing that economic growth could solve poverty problem by job creation. GEAR emphasised that economic growth should be led by the private sector and reduced the role state took in economy. As a result, the decrease in public spending led to the elimination or shrinkage of social services.

== Types of Programmes ==
=== Social Security Grants ===
==== The Child Support Grant (CSG) ====
The Child Support Grant was introduced in 1998. CSG is a cash assistance to poor children under the age of 6 and expanded to children under the age of 14 in 2005. CSG paid the guardians of the eligible children R460 per month per child in 2022 through the South African Social Security Agency (SASSA) under the DSD. According to the National Treasury of South Africa, "the CSG is now one of the largest social assistance programmes in post-apartheid South Africa reaching 11.2 million children in 2012–13, i.e., approximately 59 per cent of children." The government expenditure on CSG accounted for 3.4 per cent of GDP in 2014.

The government did not add any conditions upon the reception of CSG initially. However, since 2010, the children have to attend school to be eligible to receive CSG.

Studies have revealed that the recipients of CSG showed better nutrition status, higher scores on a height to weight growth chart, and better school enrolment rates compared to children who are equally poor.

==== The Foster Child Grant (FCG) ====
Foster parents of children under the age of 15 were eligible for the Foster Child Grant in 2010. Since 2012, the qualification for FCG expanded to include foster children under the age of 18. The value of FCG per month per child is R1050 in 2022, more than twice the size of the Child Support Grant. These benefits are received through cash, direct deposit, or through an overseeing institution. The grant is reviewed every 2 years through a court, and may be suspended or lapse if the child's parental circumstances have changed, the guardians fail to comply with the court, or there is evidence of fraudulence when filing for FCG.

==== National School Nutrition Program (NSNP) ====
The National School Nutrition Program began in 1994 with a mandate to provide free lunch in all non-fee-paying schools (i.e., those categorized as quintiles 1 through 3 in the South African schools classification system). As of 2020, 9.6 million school children (about two-thirds of whom are primary school students and one-third of whom are secondary school students) benefited from the program. The NSNP reaches an estimated 72% of school-age children in the country. Foods are purchased domestically, and the program is wholly government-funded with a budget of about US$520 million.

==== Old-age pension ====
The old-age pension accounts for the highest amount of government expenditure among all social assistance programmes in South Africa.

The old-age pension was established in South Africa as early as the 1920s. However, the old-age pension system had reflected strong racial inequality until the 1990s. For example, in the early 1980s, whites received benefits 10 times the benefits received by blacks. From 1989 to 1993, the government took efforts to reform the old-age pension to expand it to the entire population and eliminate racial inequality in the pension programme. The benefits blacks received increased from R1555 a year in 1980 to R3081 a year in 1993. The pension programme has not undergone large reforms since 1993 but the government adjusts the monetary value in accordance to inflation rates. In 2010, women aged 60 and above and men aged 61 above could receive R21000 per year.

==== Disability grant ====
The Department of Social Development offers qualifying residents income support in the form of disability grants via the South African Social Security Agency. The 2014 CSDA study showed that the grant was only received by 10% of the disabled people in South Africa. A 2010 study published by the University of Johannesburg, showed that 61% of disabled people living in the 8 poorest wards in Johannesburg were not accessing the state's disability grant due to various reasons, including not knowing that the grant existed.

People with disabilities above the age of 18 are eligible for the disability grant. They can receive R1010 per month per person.

==== Care Dependency Grant ====
Parents, guardians, and primary caregivers of children with disabilities are able to qualify for the Care Dependency Grant. To qualify, single parents must earn less than R223 200 annually and couples must earn less than R446 400 collectively, with exemptions made for foster parents. The grant provides recipients R1 890 per month via cash, electronic deposit, or administrative institution.

==== War veterans grant ====
Veterans who fought in the Second World War (1939–1945) or the Korean War (1950–1953) and who are above the age of 60 are eligible to the war veteran grant provided by the Department of Military Veterans. Each veteran can receive R1,800 per month from the South African Social Security Agency. During the Second World War, South Africa sent approximately 200,000 troops to support the Allied Forces and 826 troops to the Korean War in the 2 Squadron.

=== Unemployment Insurance (UI) ===
Unemployment insurance was introduced as early as 1966 through the passage of the first Unemployment Insurance Act. However, the first Unemployment Insurance Act excluded black workers, workers in informal sectors, and civil servants from receiving unemployment benefits. The amended Unemployment Insurance Act was passed in 2001. At present, any employers who contribute to the Unemployment Insurance Fund can receive one day of unemployment benefits for every six days of employment once they become unemployed. The contributors can receive up to 238 days of unemployment insurance. However, the unemployment insurance excludes workers in informal sectors, civil servants, and workers who have never worked before.

=== Healthcare ===
In South Africa, private and public health systems exist in parallel. The public system serves the vast majority of the population. Authority and service delivery are divided between the national Department of Health, provincial health departments, and municipal health departments.

In 2017, South Africa spent 8.1% of GDP on health care, or US$499.2 per capita. Of that, approximately 42% was government expenditure. About 79% of doctors work in the private sector.

For the 2024/2025 fiscal year, the South African Government allocated R277 billion for health spending in its annual budget. It also announced its intent to increase healthcare spending to R329 billion by the 2027/28 fiscal year.

As of January 2026, major private healthcare companies in South Africa include Mediclinic Group (134 locations), Netcare (124 locations), Life Healthcare Group (63 locations), Lenmed (19 locations), Clinix Health Group (8 locations), and Melomed (6 locations).

Major private pathology (medical laboratory) companies in South Africa include Ampath, PathCare, and Lancet.

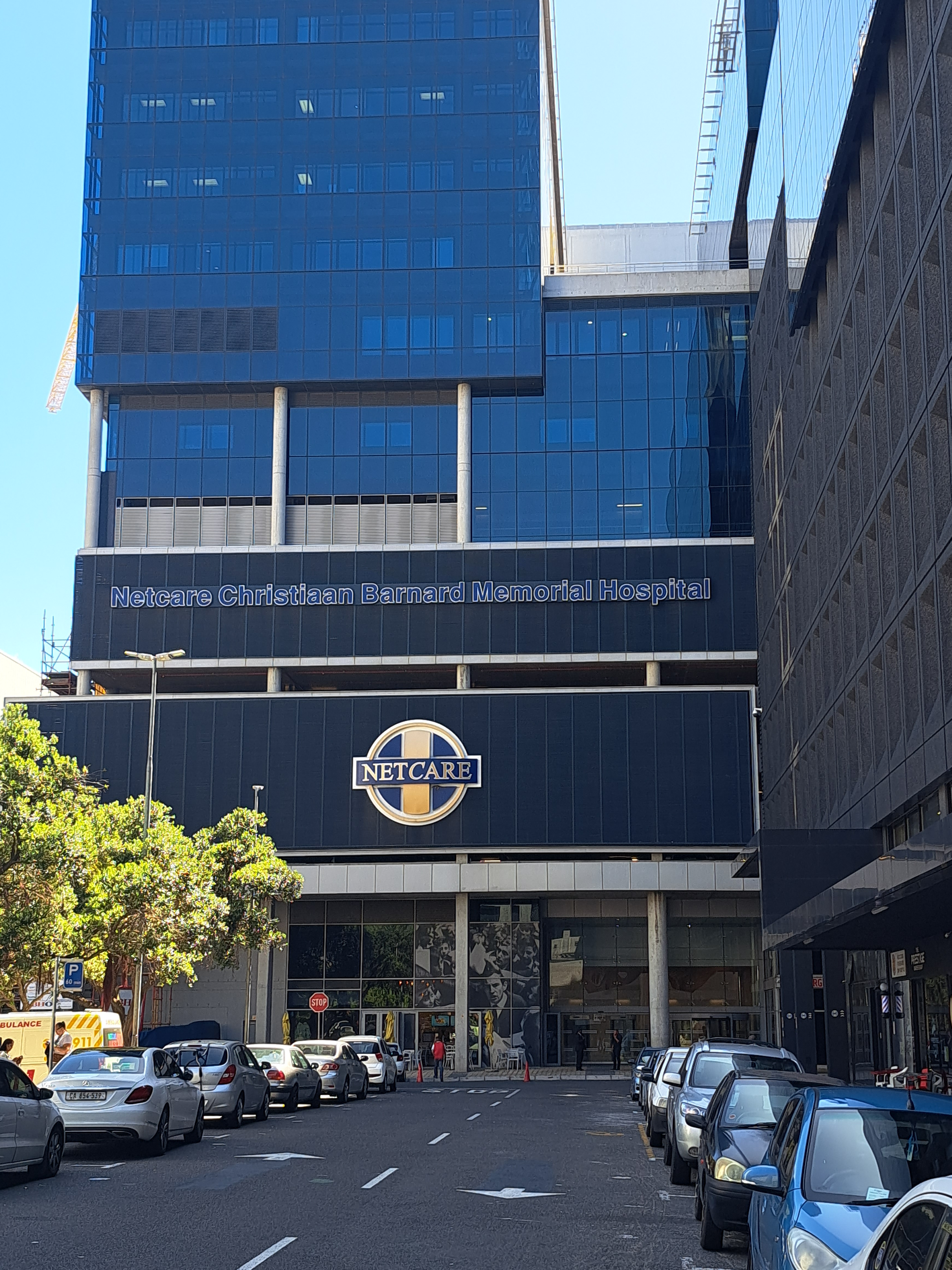
The private Netcare Christiaan Barnard Memorial Hospital in Cape Town CBD

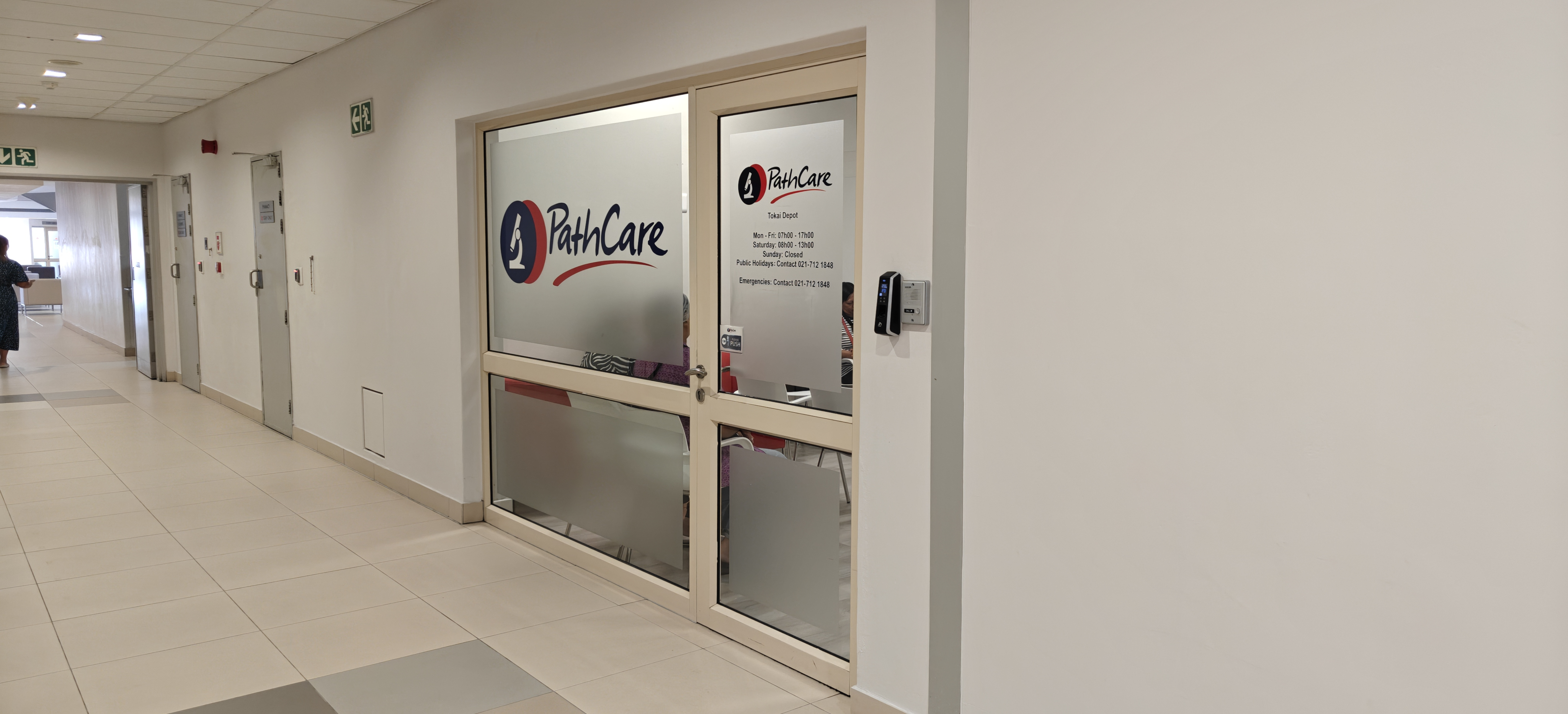
Pathcare branch at Melomed Tokai Private Hospital in Tokai, Cape Town. Pathcare is one of South Africa's major private pathology (medical laboratory) companies

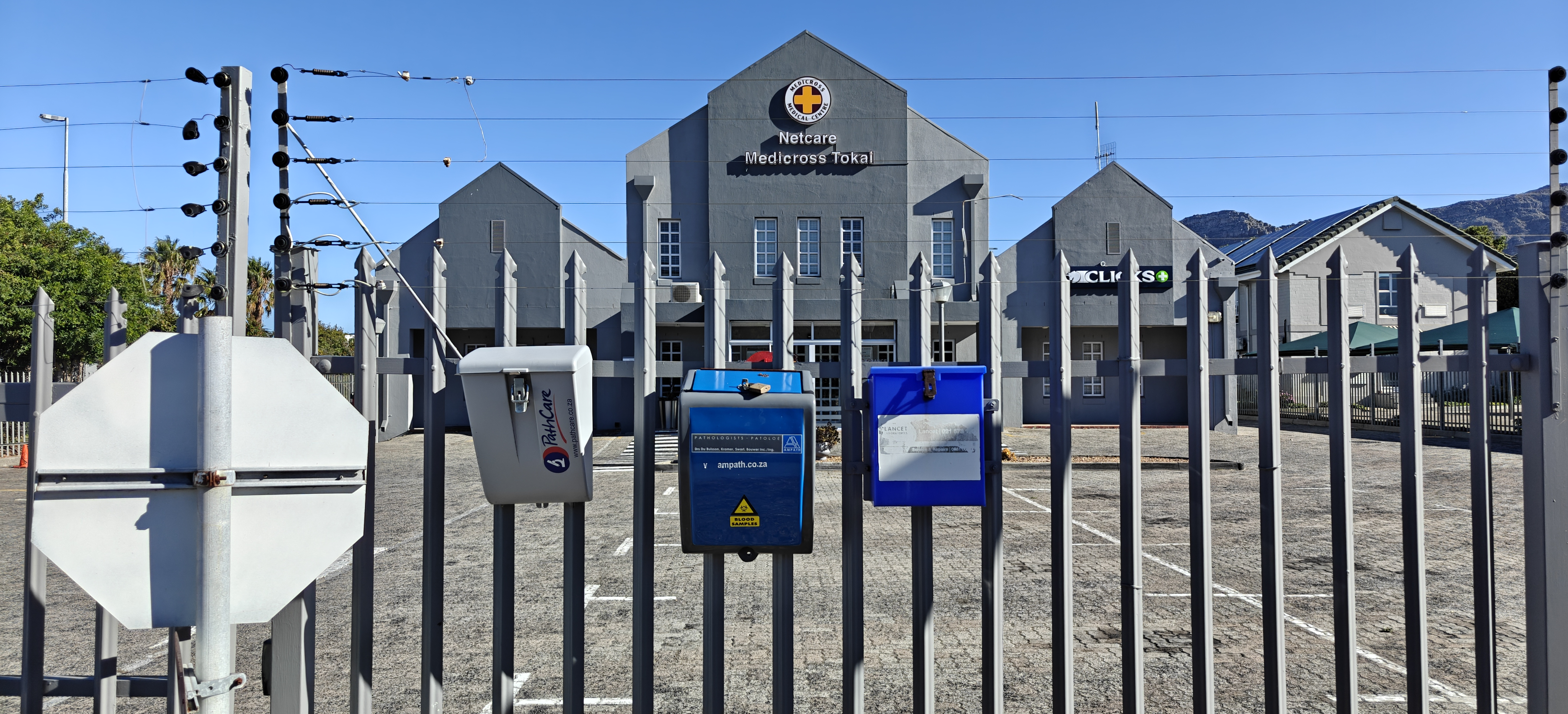
Private pathology company mailboxes outside Netcare Medicross Tokai private clinic, in Tokai, Cape Town

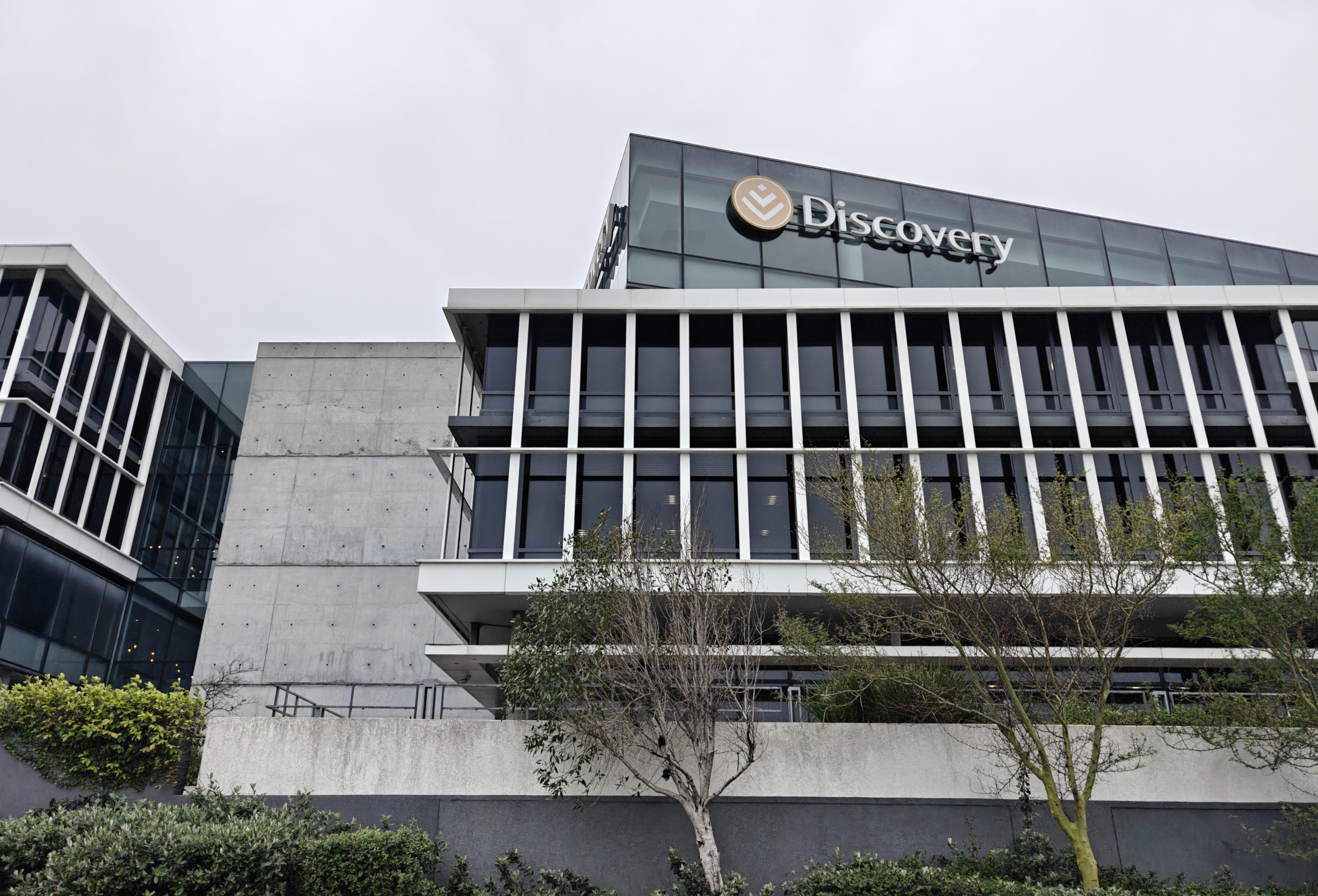
Discovery office in Century City, Cape Town. Discovery is South Africa's largest provider of private health insurance (medical aid), with 4.14 million members as of 2023

=== Housing ===
In 1994, the post-apartheid government announced its plan to provide one million homes in the next 5 years as part of the Reconstruction and Development Programme (RDP). The program's goal was to address the housing disparity created during apartheid. The government fulfilled its claim by providing 1,155,300 homes that could house 5,776,300 people by 2000. To address housing disparity during apartheid, the post-apartheid government launched housing subsidies based on recipients' income in 1994. Recipients whose monthly income is below R800 can receive a subsidy of R15,000; recipients whose monthly income ranges from 801 to R1500 receive R12,500; recipients whose monthly income ranges from R1501 to R2500 receive R9,500; recipients whose monthly income ranges from R2501 to R3500 receive R5,000. According to Stats SA's GHS of 2018, "the percentage of households that received some form of government housing subsidy increased from 5.6% in 2002 to 13.6% in 2018."

== Support ==
Supporters of the social welfare programmes in South Africa argue that these programmes have a positive impact on poor people's lives. Studies suggest that the children who receive Child Support Grant (CSG) show better nutrition status and better school enrolment rates compared to children who are equally poor. Recipients of CSG are also more likely to find jobs when they grow up. If a woman in the household receives the old-age pension, the girls in the household show better nutrition status than girls in families where no women are receiving the old-age pension. Similarly, women-led households that receive CSG show increased child enrolment in school and the mothers are more likely to participate in the labour market. Domestic child labour is thought to decrease in recipient households.

The RDP housing project provided more than 1 million homes to poor people.

Some people are concerned that social grants foster a "dependency culture" that demotivates the unemployed to search for jobs. However, recent studies suggest that the reception of social grants does not affect jobless people's incentive to seek employment. The main reason is that social grants, such as Child Support Grant, old-age pension, and disability grant, are aimed at supporting people who cannot work due to age or disability. People without disabilities and of working age are not eligible for any grants in South Africa currently.

== Criticism ==
Corruption and maladministration are huge problems that exist in South African social welfare system. According to Reddy, South Africa lost R1,5 billion per year through corruption and maladministration in the delivery of social grants.

Despite the government's efforts to provide RDP housing, homelessness continues to increase due to increasing level of unemployment and the lack of affordable housing. Moreover, since the government did not establish a standard building regulations for the developers of RDP housing, many RDP housing units are characterised with inferior quality. Residents complained about the lack of air bricks, roofs without ceilings, improperly built walls, doors that did not open or close properly, lack of privacy, and improperly designed kitchen and lavatory. Additionally, only South African citizens are eligible for RDP housing which excludes a significant population of immigrants that are living in unsuitable housing. Nearly 2,000 government officials were arrested for corruption during the project and several housing projects may be improperly built because of relations between contractors and officials.

The Department of Military Veterans has been accused of skewed distribution of resources, with critics saying some provinces were entirely under served. There is a lack of offices distributed across the country so veterans seeking help must travel to Pretoria for service.

The other criticism with RDP housing units are the lack of basic services such as running water, sewerage and electricity and amenities such as schools and clinics. For example, one of the RDP housing units in Braamfischerville, Soweto, established in 1996, only had one temporary primary school housed in shipping containers and no secondary school nor high school in 2002. The main roads were not paved until 2008. The storm-water drainage system was not installed. RDP housing units are also characterised with small size. RDP homes are also characterised with small size. According to David Pottie, only 30% of all houses built by the government were larger than 30 m^{2}.
