= Minister of Social Development (South Africa) =

Cabinet position

South Africa Minister of Social Development
- Flag of South Africa

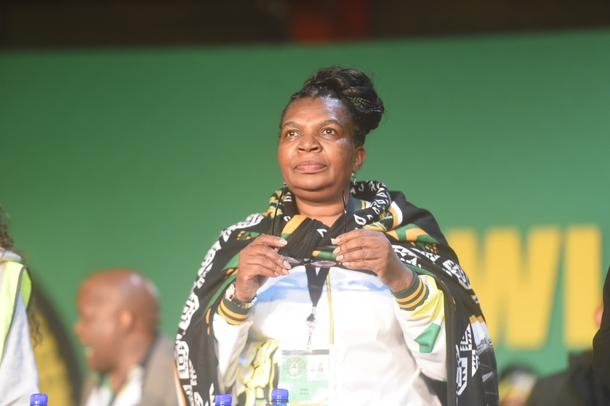
- Incumbent; Dina Pule since 01 July 2026
- Department of Social Development
- Style: The Honourable
- Member of: Cabinet
- Appointer: President of South Africa
- Inaugural holder: Zola Skweyiya
- Formation: 17 June 1999; 27 years ago
- Deputy: Ganief Hendricks
- Website: Department of Social Development

The minister of social development is a minister in the Cabinet of South Africa who is the political head of the Department of Social Development and its agencies, including the South African Social Security Agency. As of 1 July 2026, the incumbent minister is DIna Pule, following the dismissal of Sisisi Tolashe in May 2026. The deputy minister is Ganief Hendricks.

The ministry was created in June 1999 when Thabo Mbeki took office as President of South Africa in the 1999 general election. Its precursor in the cabinet of Nelson Mandela was the Ministry for Welfare and Population Development, where Geraldine Fraser-Moleketi was incumbent from June 1996 to June 1999.

== List of ministers ==
Minister	Term		President	Ref.
The Hon. Zola Skweyiya MP	17 June 1999	10 May 2009	Mbeki (I) Mbeki (II) Motlanthe (I)	
The Hon. Edna Molewa MP	11 May 2009	31 October 2010	Zuma (I)	
The Hon. Bathabile Dlamini MP	1 November 2010	26 February 2018	Zuma (I)	
The Hon. Bathabile Dlamini MP	1 November 2010	26 February 2018	Zuma (II)	
The Hon. Susan Shabangu MP	27 February 2018	29 May 2019	Ramaphosa (I)	
The Hon. Lindiwe Zulu MP	30 May 2019	17 June 2024	Ramaphosa (II)	
The Hon. Sisisi Tolashe MP	30 June 2024	14 May 2026	Ramaphosa (III)	
The Hon. Dina Pule MP	1 July 2026	present	Ramaphosa (III)	
