= Ganief Hendricks =

South African politician (born 1949)

Ganief Hendricks MP
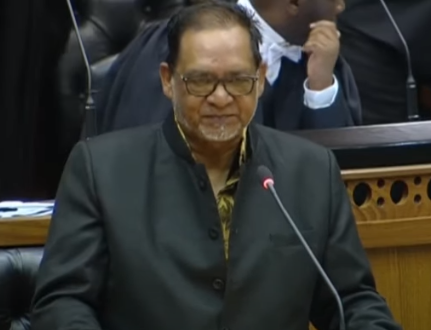
- Hendricks in May 2019

Deputy Minister of Social Development of South Africa
- Incumbent
- Assumed office 3 July 2024

Member of the National Assembly of South Africa
- Incumbent
- Assumed office 22 May 2019

President of Al Jama-ah
- Incumbent
- Assumed office April 2007
- Preceded by: Party established

Personal details
- Born: Mogamad Ganief Ebrahim Hendricks; 14 September 1949 (age 77) Cape Town, Cape Province, Union of South Africa
- Party: Al Jama-ah
- Spouse: Fatima
- Children: 4
- Education: University of the Western Cape

Mogamad Ganief Ebrahim Hendricks (born 14 September 1949) is a South African politician, businessman, lecturer and teacher who is a Member of the National Assembly of South Africa. He became an MP on 22 May 2019. He is the founder and current leader of Al Jama-ah, a party for upholding Muslim interests in South Africa. Hendricks was previously a City of Cape Town municipal councillor. Since 3 July 2024, he serves as Deputy Minister of Social Development of South Africa.

== Early life and education ==
Hendricks was born on 14 September 1949 to Imam Shaikh Ebrahim Latiff from Durban and Ghairoennisaa Ally Hendricks from District Six. His mother was a political activist. Both his maternal and paternal grandparents were from Johannesburg and they were involved in the struggle against apartheid. The Latiff family had to change their surname to Hendricks in order to avoid being deported to the Natal Province during the 1960s.

Hendricks attended the Chapel Street Primary School and Trafalgar High School, but matriculated from Harold Cressy High School. Hendricks earned a Bachelor of Arts degree in history and sociology and a honours degree in industrial psychology from the University of the Western Cape. At university, he campaigned for free education and he also founded a student newspaper Unibel and was its editor.

== Early career ==
Hendricks was involved with the Free Nelson Mandela campaign. He is one of the founding members of the Muslim Students Association of South Africa (MSA) and was an executive member of the Majlis-su-Shura Al Islami. Hendricks was deputy chairperson of the Forum for Black Journalists and served as the general secretary of the trade union for workers with sensory disorders. He was also a cricket manager and a national chess champion. Hendricks worked with Hassen Howa in sport in District Six.

Hendricks was also a lecturer at the University of the Western Cape and the Peninsula Technikon (now the Cape Peninsula University of Technology). He was a teacher at Mount View High School, Bridgetown High School, Rosedale Primary School and Easter Peak Primary School. Hendricks was also chairperson of the Management and Leadership Development Association in Langa, Cape Town. Hendricks worked as a Regional Personnel Manager and later a National Industrial Relations Specialist at Nestlé for 18 years. He was a human resource director at MWEB. Hendricks was the deputy chairperson of an organisation that consisted of 300 affiliates of Muslim groups who all called for South Africa's first multiracial general elections in 1994 to be boycotted, however, Hendricks later decided to vote in that election. He co-founded Radio 786 in 1995.

In 2002, Hendricks was given the 'Pioneer of the Internet in South Africa' award.

== Political career ==
Hendricks founded Al Jama-ah in April 2007, a party intended to uphold Muslim rights and interests in South Africa. Hendricks was elected to the Cape Town city council in 2011 as Al Jama-ah's sole councillor. He was re-elected in 2016.

=== Parliament ===
In the 2019 general election, Al Jama-ah won one seat in the National Assembly, the lower house of parliament. Hendricks took up the seat. He was sworn into office using the first Quran written by Tuan Guru while he was imprisoned on Robben Island in the 1700s. He serves on multiple committees, including the Joint Standing Committee on Intelligence, the Standing Committee on Public Accounts, the Portfolio Committee on Employment and Labour, the Portfolio Committee on Health, the Portfolio Committee on Home Affairs, the Portfolio Committee on International Relations and Cooperation, the Portfolio Committee on Justice and Correctional Services, and the Portfolio Committee on Small Business Development.After the 2024 elections Al jama-ah joined the progressive Cucas which included parties like the MK, EFF, ATM, PAC, UDM, NCC and were opposing the Government of national unity, however days later after the first sitting of parliament Hendricks announced that Al jama-ah will join the government of national unity and on 30 June he was appointed deputy minister of Social development under minister Sisisi Tolashe.

In March 2021, Hendricks voted against establishing an ad-hoc committee to investigate Public Protector Busisiwe Mkhwebane’s fitness to hold office. He became a non-voting member of the Committee for Section 194 Enquiry on 7 April 2021. On 21 June 2021, he became a voting member.

=== Cape Town mayoral candidacy ===
On 31 May 2021, Hendricks was announced as Al Jama-ah's mayoral candidate for the City of Cape Town in the 2021 local government elections.

== Personal life ==
Hendricks is married to Fatima. They have four children.
