= Department of Social Development (South Africa) =

South African government department

Department overview
- Formed: 1937; 89 years ago
- Jurisdiction: Government of South Africa
- Annual budget: R 234.972 billion (2021/22)
- Ministers responsible: Dina Pule, Minister of Social Development; Ganief Hendricks, Deputy Minister of Social Development
- Website: www.dsd.gov.za

The Department of Social Development (DSD) of South Africa is a government department responsible for providing social development, protection, and welfare services to the public. Previously called the Department of Welfare, it was renamed in July 2000. The current Minister of Social Development is Dina Pule.

== Establishing Law ==
The first Department was established in 1937, to regulate and subsidise existing private, non-governmental welfare services, while providing some additional services. The 1997 White Paper for Social Welfare noted that post-Apartheid South Africa had inherited social welfare programmes which were “not considered to be critical social investment priorities and were under-resourced”.

The Department "endeavours to create a better life for the poor, vulnerable and excluded people in society". It is tasked with reducing poverty, promoting social integration, and creating conditions for sustainable livelihoods. The department also conducts research that develops the social indicators necessary for programme implementation and public accountability. Their mandate includes the provision of social assistance to the vulnerable through welfare services, social development and disaster relief.

Contained within the DSD is the Nonprofit Organisations Directorate, which was established in 1997. It is tasked with administering the Register for Nonprofit Organisations. This register is voluntary. It seeks to increase credibility and transparency by having nonprofit organisations report details of their operations.

The DSD plays a significant role in helping administer the South African non-profit sector. According to the South African Constitution, several rights are safeguarded through its Bill of Rights. Consequently, the DSD has a crucial role to play in administering social services and collaborating with the NPO sector to ensure peoples’ rights.

== Activities of the Directorate ==
The primary activities of the DSD directorate include the management and overview of services that seek to improve the quality of life of citizens, particularly due to unemployment, disability and old age. In addition, the DSD directorate also oversees programs directly related to the impact of HIV/AIDS on citizen and poverty reduction, among others.

== South African Social Security Agency ==
The South African Social Security Agency (SASSA) is a national agency of the government created in April 2005 in order to distribute social grants on behalf of the Department of Social Development, with the latest grant being Social Relief Distress Grant SRD

== History and Recent Developments ==
Since the 1990s, welfare services have been allocated 10% of the department's overall budget. According to researcher Lisa Vetten, pay increases for the department's civil servants have been consistently higher than inflation for the past 10 years; these increases have shrunk the budget for provision of services, and have correspondingly diminished funding to the non-governmental organisation (NGO) sector. She argues underfunding has created a two-tier system of care, in which government services are considerably better resourced than NGO counterparts. Further exacerbating NGOs’ situations is the department's late payment of their subsidies. In the Eastern Cape, reports have been made that the DSD is only subsidizing 40-50% of care for home-based and community care for seniors, leaving vulnerable seniors to pay for the remaining costs themselves. Demonstrating that the DSD lacks financial capacity to provide social services. Similarly, criticisms have also been leveled that the government is providing insufficient funding for the provision of shelters and services for women and LGBTQ victims of gender-based violence. During the height of the COVID-19 pandemic, the government also faced backlash over its failure to provide food distribution to those in need, particularly school-aged children.

In 2023, the department began a trial period of its own streaming platform (DSDTV) with a budget of R81 250 a month. The project was called a "vanity project of the minister" by sitting member of the portfolio committee for social development, Alexandra Abrahams, as the intended audience of vulnerable people don't have the resources to access a streaming service. The streaming service is in addition to the Government Communications and Information System spending R1 billion on its streaming service.

In October 2023, a provincial branch of the Department of Social Development (DSD) in KwaZulu-Natal, was accused by a local group of NPOs to not be paying much needed subsidies, having a negative effect on upwards of 400 000 people. This number includes vulnerable children, disabled people, and the elderly. The KwaZulu-Natal department cites having cash flow problems.

In November 2023, the head of the Department of Social Development, Lindiwe Zulu, faced some criticism that the department's Gender-Based Violence (GBV) call centre had collapsed. Some activists note that with respect to Gender-Based Violence, South Africa has good laws, but fails at implementation.
