= African National Congress candidates for the 2014 South African general election =

Full list submitted to the Electoral Commission for the 2014 national elections

The African National Congress retained majorities in the National Assembly of South Africa & National Council of Provinces as well as in all provincial legislatures with the exception of the Western Cape. Members are elected using party-list proportional representation.

== National Assembly (National List) ==
- Candidates whose names are in **bold** were elected; names in italics were elected but chose not to take their seats.
1. **Jacob Zuma**
2. **Cyril Ramaphosa**
3. **Malusi Gigaba**
4. **Naledi Pandor**
5. **Jeff Radebe**
6. **Fikile Mbalula**
7. **Blade Nzimande**
8. **Bathabile Dlamini**
9. **Lindiwe Sisulu**
10. **Collins Chabane**
11. **Angie Motshekga**
12. **Nathi Mthethwa**
13. **Pravin Gordhan**
14. **Nosiviwe Mapisa-Nqakula**
15. **Thoko Didiza**
16. **Aaron Motsoaledi**
17. **Derek Hanekom**
18. **Max Sisulu**
19. **Baleka Mbete**
20. **Thulas Nxesi**
21. **Maite Nkoana-Mashabane**
22. **Zizi Kodwa**
23. **Edna Molewa**
24. **S'bu Ndebele**
25. **Jeremy Cronin**
26. **Lulama Xingwana**
27. **Jackson Mthembu**
28. **Buti Manamela**
29. **Winnie Madikizela-Mandela**
30. **Nomaindia Mfeketo**
31. **Siyabonga Cwele**
32. **Gugile Nkwinti**
33. **Ngoako Ramatlhodi**
34. **Dipuo Peters**
35. **Stone Sizani**
36. **Lindiwe Zulu**
37. **Tina Joemat-Pettersson**
38. **Mildred Oliphant**
39. **Marthinus van Schalkwyk** (later resigned)
40. **Yunus Carrim**
41. **Tito Mboweni**
42. **Susan Shabangu**
43. **Robert Davies**
44. **Rejoice Mabudafhasi**
45. **Ayanda Dlodlo**
46. **Ruth Bhengu**
47. **Joyce Moloi-Moropa**
48. **Pam Tshwete**
49. **Dikeledi Magadzi**
50. **Hlengiwe Mkhize**
51. **Thabang Makwetla**
52. **Rosemary Nokuzola Capa**
53. **Pule Mabe**
54. **Beauty Dlulane**
55. **Ebrahim Patel**
56. **Thandi Tobias**
57. **Ben Martins**
58. **Candith Mashego-Dlamini**
59. **Senzeni Zokwana**
60. **Lusizo Makhubela-Mashele**
61. **Mduduzi Manana**
62. **Tokozile Xasa**
63. **Mandla Mandela**
64. **Dikeledi Mahlangu**
65. **Joe Phaahla**
66. **Dipuo Letsatsi-Duba**
67. **David Mahlobo**
68. **Elsie Coleman**
69. **Mathole Motshekga**
70. Dina Pule (declined nomination)
71. **Obed Bapela**
72. **Connie September**
73. **Pallo Jordan**
74. **Lumka Yengeni**
75. **Ebrahim Ebrahim**
76. **Lynne Brown**
77. **Solomon Lechesa Tsenoli**
78. **Phumzile Ngwenya-Mabila**
79. **Fish Mahlalela**
80. **Sheila Shope-Sithole**
81. **Cassel Mathale**
82. **Xoliswa Sandra Tom**
83. **Mlungisi Johnson**
84. **Grace Tseke**
85. **Fikile Majola**
86. **Vatiswa Bam-Mugwanya**
87. **Godfrey Oliphant**
88. **Hendrietta Bogopane-Zulu**
89. **Madala Masuku**
90. **Fatima Chohan**
91. **Moses Masango**
92. **Raesibe Eunice Nyalungu**
93. **Sango Patekile Holomisa**
94. **Nokukhanya Mthembu**
95. **Mcebisi Skwatsha**
96. **Bongi Maria Ntuli**
97. **Andries Nel**
98. **Nomakhaya Mdaka**
99. **Enver Surty**
100. **Sibongile Manana**
101. **Monwabisi Goqwana**

== See also ==
- African National Congress
