= List of members of the 2022–2027 African National Congress National Executive Committee =

The members of the National Executive Committee of the African National Congress elected at the 55th national conference held in 2022 at Nasrec. It succeeded the National Executive Committee elected back in 2017 at the 54th national conference.

== Officials ==
The conference began on 16 December 2022 at Nasrec where the previous conference was held back in 2017. After several delays, voting to elect the Top Seven officials began in the evening of Sunday 18 December and continued into the night. The results of the election, as announced on 19 December, were as follows (with winners in bold):

Position	Candidate	Votes	
President	**Cyril Ramaphosa**	**2,476**	**56.62%**
President	Zweli Mkhize	1,897	43.38%
Deputy President	**Paul Mashatile**	**2,178**	**50.06%**
Deputy President	Ronald Lamola	315	7.24%
Deputy President	Oscar Mabuyane	1,858	42.7%
National Chairperson	Stanley Mathabatha	2,018	46.28%
National Chairperson	**Gwede Mantashe**	**2,062**	**47.29%**
National Chairperson	David Masondo	280	6.42%
Secretary General	Mdumiseni Ntuli	1,080	24.76%
Secretary General	Phumalo Masualle	1,590	36.45%
Secretary General	**Fikile Mbalula**	**1,692**	**38.79%**
First Deputy Secretary General	**Nomvula Mokonyane**	**2,195**	**50.58%**
First Deputy Secretary General	Tina Joemat-Pettersson	2,145	49.42%
Second Deputy Secretary General	**Maropene Ramokgopa**	**2,373**	**54.92%**
Second Deputy Secretary General	Ronalda Nalumango	1,948	45.08%
Treasurer General	Bejani Chauke	590	13.62%
Treasurer General	Pule Mabe	1,652	38.13%
Treasurer General	Mzwandile Masina	281	6.49%
Treasurer General	**Gwen Ramokgopa**	**1,809**	**41.76%**

== Additional members ==
On 20 December 2022, voting delegates voted for the additional members of the National Executive Committee. The following day, the chairperson of the ANC's electoral committee Kgalema Motlanthe released the names of the 80 new additional members.

Rank	Name	Gender	Total votes
1	Sihle Zikalala	M	2218
2	Mduduzi Manana	M	2152
3	Ronald Lamola	M	2115
4	Mdumiseni Ntuli	M	2075
5	Bheki Cele	M	2022
6	Senzo Mchunu	M	1932
7	Malusi Gigaba	M	1856
8	Pule Mabe	M	1806
9	Zizi Kodwa	M	1792
10	David Makhura	M	1772
11	Andile Lungisa	M	1758
12	Mmamoloko Kubayi	F	1730
13	Tina Joemat-Pettersson	F	1726
14	Stella Ndabeni-Abrahams	F	1719
15	Thembi Nkadimeng	F	1681
16	Zweli Mkhize	M	1673
17	Soviet Lekganyane	M	1653
18	Febe Potgieter	F	1606
19	Enoch Godongwana	M	1554
20	Sibongile Besani	M	1546
21	Pinky Kekana	F	1518
22	Buti Manamela	M	1503
23	David Mahlobo	M	1486
24	Cassel Mathale	M	1478
25	Pemmy Majodina	F	1470
26	Lindiwe Zulu	F	1451
27	Aaron Motsoaledi	M	1448
28	Khusela Diko	F	1439
29	Bathabile Dlamini	F	1430
30	Phumulo Masualle	M	1425
31	Mzwandile Masina	M	1408
32	Thandi Modise	F	1405
33	Nkosazana Dlamini-Zuma	F	1402
34	Mondli Gungubele	M	1369
35	Thoko Didiza	F	1362
36	Parks Tau	M	1362
37	Obed Bapela	M	1340
38	Supra Mahumapelo	M	1336
39	Joe Maswanganyi	M	1317
40	Tandi Mahambehlala	F	1316
41	David Masondo	M	1304
42	Babalo Madikizela	M	1286
43	Noxolo Kiviet	F	1275
44	Njabulo Nzuza	M	1275
45	Dickson Masemola	M	1268
46	Nobuhle Nkabane	F	1248
47	Peggy Nkonyeni	F	1248
48	Barbara Creecy	F	1242
49	Kgosientso Ramokgopa	M	1229
50	Khumbudzo Ntshavheni	F	1204
51	Joe Phaahla	M	1204
52	Lindiwe Sisulu	F	1187
53	Polly Boshielo	F	1182
54	Zuko Godlimpi	M	1172
55	Nonceba Mhlauli	F	1168
56	Thabang Makwetla	M	1167
57	Nkenke Kekana	M	1158
58	Donald Selamolela	M	1143
59	Cyril Xaba	M	1128
60	Sindisiwe Chikunga	F	1112
61	Dakota Legoete	M	1111
62	Bejani Chauke	M	1106
63	Lindiwe Ntshalintshali	F	1092
64	Lungi Gcabashe	F	1091
65	Nocawe Mafu	F	1081
66	Ronalda Nalumango	F	1067
67	Dina Pule	F	1061
68	Joy Maimela	F	1058
69	Angie Motshekga	F	1052
70	Mahlengi Bhengu	F	1038
71	Pam Tshwete	F	1024
72	Dipuo Letsatsi-Duba	F	1014
73	Refilwe Mtsweni-Tsipane	F	1008
74	Nomakhosazana Meth	F	997
75	Faith Muthambi	F	992
76	Rosemary Capa	F	986
77	Sisisi Tolashe	F	973
78	Reginah Mhaule	F	972
79	Violet Siwela	F	969
80	Thandi Moraka	F	946

=== Co-opted members ===
On 30 January 2023, the ANC announced that it had co-opted four party members onto the NEC in an attempt to increase minority representation on the party's highest decision-making body between conferences. The four party members are as follows:

- Gerhard Koornhof
- Alvin Botes
- Fawzia Peer
- Steve Mapaseka Letsike
