= List of members of the 2017–2022 African National Congress National Executive Committee =

Elected leaders for the 2017-2022 term

The members of the National Executive Committee of the African National Congress elected at the 54th national conference in 2017 at Nasrec, which served until the 55th national conference in 2022, also held at Nasrec.

== Officials ==
The ANC elective conference began on 16 December 2017. On the second day of the conference, delegates nominated candidates for the officials ("Top Six" leadership positions (President, Deputy President, Chairperson, Secretary General, Deputy Secretary General and Treasurer)) as follows, with voting running through the night on 17 to 18 December, and results announced on the evening of Monday 18 December (victorious candidates in bold):

Position	Candidate	Votes
President	**Cyril Ramaphosa**	**2440**
	Nkosazana Dlamini-Zuma	2261
Deputy President	**David Mabuza**	**2538**
	Lindiwe Sisulu	2159
National Chairperson	**Gwede Mantashe**	**2418**
	Nathi Mthethwa	2269
Secretary General	**Ace Magashule**	**2360**
	Senzo Mchunu	2336
Deputy Secretary General	**Jessie Duarte**	**2474**
	Zingiswa Losi	2213
Treasurer General	**Paul Mashatile**	**2517**
	Maite Nkoana-Mashabane	2178

== Members ==
The remaining 80 members of the National Executive Committee were elected and announced toward the end of the conference.

- Zweli Mkhize
- Lindiwe Zulu
- Reginah Mhaule
- David Masondo
- Malusi Gigaba
- Ronald Lamola
- Violet Siwela
- Zizi Kodwa
- Nkosazana Dlamini-Zuma
- Obed Bapela
- Tito Mboweni
- Lindiwe Sisulu
- Bheki Cele
- Fikile Mbalula
- Thoko Didiza
- Sdumo Dlamini
- Bathabile Dlamini
- Senzo Mchunu
- Pravin Gordhan
- Naledi Pandor
- Alvin Botes
- Zingiswa Losi
- Jackson Mthembu
- Phumulo Masualle
- Pule Mabe
- Sfiso Buthelezi
- Mduduzi Manana
- Aaron Motsoaledi
- Thandi Modise
- Bongani Bongo
- Enoch Godongwana
- Nomvula Mokonyane
- Baleka Mbete
- Derek Hanekom
- Mondli Gungubele
- Jeff Radebe
- Edna Molewa
- Collen Maine
- Nathi Mthethwa
- Tina Joemat-Pettersson
- Nkenke Kekana
- Maite Nkoana-Mashabane
- Angie Motshekga
- David Mahlobo
- Ruth Bhengu
- Mosebenzi Zwane
- Pinky Kekana
- Nocawe Mafu
- Joe Maswanganyi
- Tony Yengeni
- Joel Netshitenzhe
- Dakota Legoete
- Nosiviwe Mapisa-Nqakula
- Noxolo Kiviet
- Ngoako Ramathlodi
- Mathole Motshekga
- Sibongile Besani
- Dikeledi Magadzi
- Thabang Makwetla
- Siyabonga Cwele
- Barbara Creecy
- Mildred Oliphant
- Mmamoloko Kubayi
- Tandi Mahambehlala
- Rosemary Capa
- Susan Shabangu
- Pinky Moloi
- Beauty Dlulane
- Pamela Tshwete
- Tokozile Xasa
- Dipuo Letsatsi-Duba
- Nomaindia Mfeketo
- Hlengiwe Mkhize
- Pemmy Majodina
- Faith Muthambi
- Rejoice Mabudafhasi
- Candith Mashego-Dlamini
- Sindisiwe Chikunga
- Gwen Ramokgopa
- Sylvia Lucas
- Blade Nzimande
- Ayanda Dlodlo
- Firoz Cachalia
- Neva Makgetla

=== Ex officio members ===
- William Bulwane
- Faiez Jacobs
- Natso Khumalo
- Oscar Mabuyane
- Khaya Magaxa
- Supra Mahumapelo
- Stanley Mathabatha
- Mookgo Matuba
- Mandla Ndlovu
- Deshi Ngxanga
- Njabulo Nzuza
- Hope Papo
- Zamani Saul
- Nocks Seabi
- Sihle Zikalala
- Super Zuma
