= Hendrietta Bogopane-Zulu =

South African politician (born 1971)

The Honourable Hendrietta Bogopane-Zulu MP

Deputy Minister of Social Development
- In office 26 May 2014 – 19 June 2024
- President: Jacob Zuma; Cyril Ramaphosa
- Minister: Bathabile Dlamini; Susan Shabangu; Lindiwe Zulu
- Preceded by: Bongi Ntuli

Deputy Minister for Women, Children and Persons with Disabilities
- In office 24 October 2011 – 24 April 2014
- President: Jacob Zuma
- Minister: Lulu Xingwana

Deputy Minister of Public Works
- In office 11 May 2009 – 24 October 2011
- President: Jacob Zuma
- Minister: Geoff Doidge; Gwen Mahlangu-Nkabinde
- Preceded by: Ntopile Kganyago

Member of the National Assembly
- In office 14 June 1999 – 7 May 2019

Personal details
- Born: Hendrietta Ipeleng Bogopane; 11 March 1971 (age 55)
- Citizenship: South African
- Party: African National Congress
- Spouse: Simon Zulu
- Awards: Henry Viscardi Achievement Award
- Website: www.drhendriettabogopane-zulu.co.za

Hendrietta Ipeleng Bogopane-Zulu (born 11 March 1971) is a South African politician and activist who served as Deputy Minister of Social Development from 26 May 2014 until 19 June 2024. She was succeeded by Ganief Hendricks on 3 July 2024. She represented the African National Congress (ANC) in the National Assembly from 1999 to 2019.

Bogopane-Zulu was born blind and is a disability activist. Before she was appointed to her current position, she was Deputy Minister for Women, Children and Persons with Disabilities from 2011 to 2014 and Deputy Minister of Public Works from 2009 to 2011. Her tenure in the latter position overlapped with Nkandlagate, and she was therefore involved in related investigations.

== Early life and activism ==
Born on 11 March 1971, Bogopane-Zulu grew up in rural Bophuthatswana (present-day North West Province). She was born blind but had several operations as a child and was left partially blind. In addition to various tertiary certificates and diplomas, she has a BTech in public relations from Technikon Pretoria, a BBA from the Central University of Nicaragua, and an MBA from Azteca University.

She entered politics as a social activist and was particularly active in disability activism in several different forums. She was a co-founder of Disabled Youth South Africa, the youth wing of Disabled People South Africa. Between 1996 and 1999, she was the inaugural national coordinator of the Disabled Women's Development Programme in the national Department of Public Service and Administration. During this period, she also represented the interests of persons with disabilities at the National Economic Development and Labour Council and the South African Qualifications Authority, and she helped draft the disability-related sections of the Employment Equity Act of 1998.

== Political career ==
=== National Assembly backbenches: 1999–2009 ===
In the 1999 general election, Bogopane-Zulu was elected to the National Assembly, the lower house of the South African Parliament. She represented the African National Congress (ANC) – she was already a member of the party's local branch in Tshwane East – but she was one of five representatives nominated to the ANC's list by Disabled People South Africa.

During her first term in the National Assembly, Bogopane-Zulu chaired Parliament's Joint Monitoring Committee on Children, Youth and Persons with Disabilities; during her second, which began after the 2004 general election, she was a member of the Portfolio Committee on Social Development. During this period, she was also active in the World Blind Union, where she served on the subcommittee on constitutional review.

=== Public Works: 2009–2011 ===
Bogopane-Zulu was re-elected to her parliamentary seat in the April 2009 general election, and on 10 May, newly elected President Jacob Zuma appointed her as Deputy Minister of Public Works under Minister Geoff Doidge. She was the first visually impaired woman to be appointed as a minister or deputy minister, and she was one of only two disabled ministers and deputy ministers under Zuma's cabinet, the other being Michael Masutha.

==== Nkandla security upgrades ====
While Bogopane-Zulu was in the Public Works Ministry, the Department of Public Works authorised a series of highly controversial security upgrades at the Nkandla homestead of President Zuma. The project was investigated for several years thereafter, long after Bogopane-Zulu left the portfolio, and both she and Minister Doidge were implicated in those investigations. In December 2013, Doidge's successor, Thulas Nxesi, presented the report of an inter-ministerial investigation into the security upgrades; the report absolved Zuma of wrongdoing but recommended that Doidge and Bogopane-Zulu should be investigated further for possible misconduct. Bogopane-Zulu denied wrongdoing and said that she had not been sufficiently consulted during the inquiry.

By that time, the Mail & Guardian had obtained a leaked copy of the provisional report of a parallel investigation, this one conducted by the Public Protector, Thuli Madonsela. According to the Mail & Guardian, Madonsela's report suggested that Bogopane-Zulu had been sidelined from the Nkandla project after asking questions about the details of the expenses and contracts. When Madonsela's final report was released in March 2014, it revealed that Bogopane-Zulu had been involved in discussions about the controversial swimming pool at Nkandla; she had reportedly supported the installation of a swimming pool for "developmental" reasons, suggesting that local children could take swimming lessons in it. Madonsela also concluded that there was no evidence to substantiate the claim that Doidge and Bogopane-Zulu had interfered in the appointment of contractors on the project. However, President Zuma himself later contradicted this, taking publicly the line of Nxesi's investigation and saying that further investigations suggested that Doidge and Bogopane-Zulu might have exerted "undue interference... in the appointment of certain contractors, suppliers or service providers".

=== Women, Children and Persons with Disability: 2011–2014 ===
On 24 October 2011, Zuma announced a reshuffle in which Bogopane-Zulu was appointed as Deputy Minister for Women, Children and Persons with Disabilities under Minister Lulu Xingwana. She later said that her pet projects in the ministry involved accessibility, poverty, and HIV/AIDS.

=== Social Development: 2014–present ===
Pursuant to the May 2014 general election, Bogopane-Zulu was re-elected to her fourth term in the National Assembly and was appointed by Zuma as Deputy Minister of Social Development, serving under Minister Bathabile Dlamini. Dlamini and Bogopane-Zulu had a tense relationship with Parliament and were accused of absenteeism from parliamentary committee meetings.

She was retained in her deputy ministerial office by Zuma's successor, President Cyril Ramaphosa, under Ministers Susan Shabangu and Lindiwe Zulu. However, in the 2019 general election, Bogopane-Zulu was ranked 143rd on the ANC's party list and failed to gain re-election to her parliamentary seat; Ramaphosa therefore re-reappointed her using a constitutional provision that permitted two deputy ministers to be appointed from outside the National Assembly.

==== Programmes and policies ====
In 2016, while addressing the United Nations (UN) Commission on Narcotic Drugs on behalf of an African Union bureau, Bogopane-Zulu called for a harm-reduction approach to substance abuse. The harm-reduction approach was subsequently adopted in South African policy through the government's drug master plan. In 2020, again speaking at the UN, Bogopane-Zulu again called for harm reduction and a "human rights-based" approach, arguing that the global war on drugs had failed and that drug addiction should be decriminalised.

Bogopane-Zulu also attracted press coverage for her views about gender-based violence, which received a great deal of public attention in 2019 and 2020 after the murder of Uyinene Mrwetyana. In December 2019, during her keynote address to a UN-sponsored violence-prevention conference in Johannesburg, Bogopane-Zulu argued that women were not only "victims" but also "contributors" to gender-based violence. She argued that women "raise angry boys", for example when single mothers deny fathers access to their sons. At a Women's Month event in August 2020, she was quoted as saying that cancer contributed to gender-based violence insofar as it affected sexual organs. According to the Mail & Guardian, she used the example of cervical cancer, saying that, "when women are in pain, going through treatment, they cannot perform their marital duties of providing sex to their partners, they get abused, ill-treated." She also posted a series of Tweets explaining this view. In response, Sonke Gender Justice agreed that stress arising from any disease could cause marital strain, but argued that:

[T]he causes of gender-based violence are founded in power imbalances rooted in patriarchy, gender-based inequalities and discrimination... To link gender-based violence to cancer is to grossly overlook the aforementioned root causes and therefore undermining the work that is being done to deal with the problem of gender-based violence in our society.

During the COVID-19 pandemic in South Africa, Bogopane-Zulu was appointed to head a Department of Social Development "war room" tasked with ensuring the delivery of social grants. She herself contracted COVID-19 in July 2020.

==== Nepotism scandal ====
In January 2020, City Press obtained an audio recording of a 2016 conversation between Bogopane-Zulu and Zwidofhela Mafoko, who at the time was an administrative clerk in her office and the fiancé of her niece. In the recording, Bogopane-Zulu is heard telling Mafoko that she would request to have him staffed on four international trips, so that he would be able to use the concomitant travel allowance to pay her niece's lobolo. The arrangement was viewed as nepotistic, but Bogopane-Zulu denied that it was unlawful, saying:

I did not misuse any public funds; neither did I advise or motivate for anyone to get more than what the public service prescribes... Even in the recording, it is the mother in me trying to help a young South African who is trying to do something right... I used what was there to try to assist, without stepping outside any boundaries. I said: 'What can I do to assist?' And I still state that I am a person who respects South African laws. But helping is who I am. When I am approached to assist, I assist. When I am asked for advice, if I can give it, I give it. It is very sad that something so private should be in the papers.

== Honours ==
In November 2009, Bogopane-Zulu was honoured at the Top Women Awards in Johannesburg, named as the Top Woman in the Public Sector. For her disability activism, she received the Henry Viscardi Achievement Award in 2017.

== Personal life ==
Bogopane is married and has three daughters, two of whom are also visually impaired. She had her first child as a teenager. She was hospitalised for 10 days in January 2014 after she collapsed at home.

During Bogopane-Zulu's tenure in the Ministry of Public Works, her husband, Simon Zulu, was employed as one of her aides, first as an administrative assistant and then as a personal assistant. In November 2010, the Sunday Independent reported that Zulu was under investigation for sexual harassment following a complaint by a junior member of Bogopane-Zulu's staff. Among other things, the complainant reportedly alleged that Zulu had sent her salacious text messages and threatened her with dismissal if she did not have sex with him. The newspaper also reported that the complaint included the allegation that Bogopane-Zulu had been informed of the complaint in July 2010, but had encouraged the woman to "just be nice to him and pretend as if there is nothing wrong" while documenting her encounters with Zulu.
