= Geoff Doidge =

South African politician (1954–2022)

Minister of Public Works
- In office 25 September 2008 – 31 October 2010
- President: Kgalema Motlanthe; Jacob Zuma
- Deputy: Ntopile Kganyago; Hendrietta Bogopane-Zulu
- Preceded by: Thoko Didiza
- Succeeded by: Gwen Mahlangu-Nkabinde

Member of the National Assembly
- In office 27 April 1994 – 1 November 2010

Personal details
- Born: Geoffrey Quinton Michael Doidge; 26 April 1954 Kokstad, Union of South Africa
- Died: 10 December 2022 (aged 68)
- Party: African National Congress

Geoffrey Quinton Michael Doidge (26 April 1954–11 December 2022) was a South African politician and diplomat who was South Africa's Minister of Public Works from September 2008 to October 2010. He represented the African National Congress (ANC) in the National Assembly of South Africa between April 1994 and October 2010.

Doidge was a businessman in his hometown, Kokstad, until he joined the First Parliament in 1994. In the Second and Third Parliaments, he served as Deputy Chief Whip of the Majority Party and Chairperson of Committees in the National Assembly. In September 2008, he was appointed to the cabinet by President Kgalema Motlanthe, and he remained in that position after President Jacob Zuma took office in the April 2009 elections. As public works minister, he had a controversial role in the Nkandlagate scandal.

After Zuma sacked him from the cabinet in October 2010, Doidge resigned from the National Assembly. He went on to serve as South African High Commissioner in Sri Lanka and South African Ambassador to Thailand.

== Early life and career ==
Doidge was born on 26 April 1954 in Kokstad, then part of the Cape Province and later part of KwaZulu-Natal. He was the second-eldest child of two farmers and grew up on their farm, Glen Edward, on the Drakensberg foothills. Raised Catholic, he attended Catholic schools and matriculated at Mount Currie Senior Secondary School in Kokstad. Though his paternal grandparents were British, his family was classified as Coloured under apartheid.

Doidge worked as a manager at a Toyota franchise until he and a friend started their own business, an auto parts trader called Parts Centre Kokstad, in 1978. In the latter years of apartheid, he and his wife sold their shares in the business in order to focus on civic activism. During the negotiations to end apartheid, Doidge became involved in structures of the African National Congress (ANC) in East Griqualand and the Transkei, where the party was re-establishing its presence after being unbanned in 1990. He was the chairperson of the ANC's local branch in Kokstad from 1991 to 1995.

== National Assembly: 1994–2008 ==
In South Africa's first democratic elections in April 1994, Doidge was elected to an ANC seat in the National Assembly, the lower house of the South African Parliament. He served as an ANC whip.

In the June 1999 general election, he was re-elected to his parliamentary seat and additionally was appointed as the Deputy Chief Whip of the Majority Party in the National Assembly. In this capacity he was viewed as an "able bureaucrat". On 2 February 2001, he was also appointed as spokesman and chair of the ANC's delegation in the Standing Committee of Public Accounts. Controversially, he replaced Andrew Feinstein, who had been harangued inside the ANC for his handling of the committee's inquiries into the Arms Deal.

In April 2002, the ANC announced a major reshuffle of its parliamentary caucus, in which Doidge was appointed as Chairperson of Committees, a presiding officer position in the National Assembly. He was reappointed to that position after the April 2004 general election.

== Minister of Public Works: 2008–2010 ==
Near the end of the Third Parliament, Doidge was elevated to the national executive after Kgalema Motlanthe became national president in a midterm presidential election. Announcing his cabinet on 25 September 2008, Motlanthe named Doidge as Minister of Public Works; he replaced Thoko Didiza, who had resigned after the presidential upset. The Mail & Guardian described the appointment as Doidge's "reward[] for years of loyal service as an ANC enforcer in Parliament". Andries Nel succeeded him as house chairperson in the National Assembly.

The Mail & Guardian considered Doidge one of the top performers in the cabinet during Motlanthe's brief presidency. After the April 2009 general election, he was reappointed to his ministerial position in the cabinet of Motlanthe's successor, President Jacob Zuma. In October 2009, when Zuma reconfigured the cabinet cluster system, Doidge was also appointed as deputy chairperson of the cabinet's social protection and community development cluster, in which capacity he deputised Social Development Minister Edna Molewa.

=== Nkandla security upgrades ===
While Doidge was in the public works ministry, the Department of Public Works authorised a series of highly controversial security upgrades at the Nkandla homestead of President Zuma. The project was investigated for several years thereafter, long after Doidge left the portfolio, and the investigations implicated Doidge. In December 2013, Doidge's successor in the ministry, Thulas Nxesi, presented the report of an inter-ministerial investigation into the security upgrades; the report absolved Zuma of wrongdoing but recommended that Doidge and his deputy minister, Hendrietta Bogopane-Zulu, should be investigated further for possible misconduct.

A parallel investigation conducted by the Public Protector, Thuli Madonsela, was completed in 2014, and its conclusions included that Doidge had misadvised Zuma about relevant legal prescripts and that he and his counterpart in the Ministry of Police, Nathi Mthethwa, "could have provided better executive leadership, especially with regard to speedily assessing the extent and cost of the Nkandla project". In April 2016, Zuma's office belatedly sent official letters of reprimand to Doidge and other former ministers who had mishandled the Nkandla upgrades.

=== Succession ===
In a reshuffle announced on 31 October 2010, Zuma sacked Doidge from the cabinet, replacing him with Gwen Mahlangu-Nkabinde. In the immediate aftermath of the reshuffle, Doidge resigned from his parliamentary seat on 1 November 2010 and was replaced by Celiwe Madlopha.

The Mail & Guardian said that Doidge's abrupt dismissal was "suspicious". It was widely speculated that Doidge had been fired because he had suspended questionable lease agreements between the government and politically connected businessman Roux Shabangu.

== Later career and death ==
In early 2011, the presidency announced Doidge's appointment as South African High Commissioner in Sri Lanka. After his service in Sri Lanka, he was appointed as Ambassador to Thailand.

He died of cancer on 10 December 2022.
