= Ntopile Kganyago =

South African politician

Member of the National Assembly
- In office 23 April 2004 – 17 July 2013

Deputy Minister of Public Works
- In office 10 May 2004 – 10 May 2009
- President: Thabo Mbeki; Kgalema Motlanthe
- Minister: Stella Sigcau; Thoko Didiza; Geoff Doidge
- Preceded by: Musa Zondi
- Succeeded by: Hendrietta Bogopane-Zulu

Personal details
- Born: Ntopile Marcel Kganyago; 10 December 1940
- Died: 17 July 2013 (aged 72) Centurion, Gauteng; South Africa
- Party: United Democratic Movement
- Relations: Lesetja Kganyago (nephew)
- Education: University of South Africa; University of the North; University of Delaware

Ntopile Marcel Kganyago (10 December 1940 – 17 July 2013) was a South African politician who was the Deputy Minister of Public Works between May 2004 and May 2009. The deputy president of the United Democratic Movement (UDM), he represented the party in the National Assembly of South Africa until his death in July 2013.

Before he joined the National Assembly in the April 2004 general election, Kganyago was a local councillor in his hometown, Polokwane, and served briefly as a member of the Limpopo Provincial Legislature. He trained as a teacher and education psychologist and worked as a civil servant and student counsellor until he entered politics full-time in 2004.

== Early life and career ==
Kganyago was born on 10 December 1940. He is from Seshego in the Northern Transvaal, part of present-day Limpopo Province. He matriculated in 1964 at Emmerantia Geldenhuys Skool in the region.

Initially trained as a carpenter, he worked briefly as a court interpreter in 1965 and 1966 before training as a teacher in Mafikeng; he was a school teacher between 1968 and 1976. In 1976, the year of the Soweto uprising, he joined the Department of Education as an administrator, first as a school inspector for psychological services and then, from 1980 to 1996, as the department's head of psychological services. He was a registered educational psychologist and a member of the Psychological Society of South Africa and Southern African Association for Learning and Educational Disabilities.

During his early career, Kganyago completed a Bachelor of Arts degree at the University of South Africa in 1974, a Bachelor of Education degree at the University of the North in 1987, and a Master's degree in school psychology at the University of Delaware in 1989.

In 1996, after the end of apartheid, Kganyago left his government job to return to his alma mater, the University of the North, where he was a student counsellor in the university's counseling centre until 2004. During that time he joined the United Democratic Movement (UDM) and became the chairperson of his local branch. From 2000 to 2004, he represented the party as a local councillor in the Polokwane Local Municipality.

== National government: 2004–2013 ==
Kganyago was briefly a member of the UDM's caucus in the Limpopo Provincial Legislature in early 2004. In the April 2004 general election, he was elected to represent the UDM in the National Assembly, the lower house of the South African Parliament.

In the aftermath of the election he was additionally appointed as Deputy Minister of Public Works as part of President Thabo Mbeki's initiative to ensure opposition representation in his second-term cabinet. He was sworn in late, on 10 May 2004 at Tuynhuys, because Mbeki had initially offered the post to Musa Zondi of Inkatha Freedom Party. He served in the deputy ministerial portfolio throughout the Third Parliament, retaining the post when Kgalema Motlanthe replaced Mbeki in a midterm presidential election. In the portfolio, Kganyago deputised Minister Stella Sigcau until her death in 2006, Minister Thoko Didiza from 2006 to 2008, and Minister Geoff Doidge from 2008 to 2009.

Kganyago was the UDM's provincial leader in Limpopo when he entered the deputy ministerial position, but over the course of the parliamentary term he became the party's national deputy president; the former deputy president, Malizole Diko, had been expelled from the party in 2005.

In the next general election in April 2009, Kganyago was re-elected to his parliamentary seat. He had been ranked second on the UDM's national party list and had also stood, unsuccessfully, as its candidate for election as Premier of Limpopo. President Motlanthe's successor, Jacob Zuma, appointed Hendrietta Bogopane-Zulu to succeed him as deputy minister after the election, though he remained in the National Assembly as a backbencher.

== Personal life and death ==
After a short illness, Kganyago died in hospital in Centurion, Gauteng on 17 July 2013. He was buried in Polokwane after a funeral at the Seshego Stadium; in his eulogy, UDM leader Bantu Holomisa recounted that Kganyago was universally nicknamed "Prof" because he was "widely regarded as a pedagogue". Chief Whip Smuts Ngonyama described Kganyago was "a great linguist" with a knack for switching between different South African languages, and Pieter Groenewald of the Freedom Front said that Kganyago was better at speaking Afrikaans than he was. Nqabayomzi Kwankwa filled his seat in the National Assembly.

He was married to Anna Phuti Kganyago, with whom he had nine children and several grandchildren. His nephew, Lesetja Kganyago, became the governor of the South African Reserve Bank.
