= Ndwedwe Local Municipality elections =

Local elections in KwaZulu-Natal, South Africa

The Ndwedwe Local Municipality council consists of thirty-seven members elected by mixed-member proportional representation. Nineteen councillors are elected by first-past-the-post voting in nineteen wards, while the remaining eighteen are chosen from party lists so that the total number of party representatives is proportional to the number of votes received.

In the election of 4 November 2026, the uMkhonto weSizwe Party (MKP) won a plurality of fifteen seats.

== Results ==
The following table shows the composition of the council after past elections.

Event	ANC	DA	EFF	IFP	MKP	Other	Total
2000 election	9	1	—	27	—	0	37
2006 election	18	1	—	17	—	1	37
2011 election	25	1	—	5	—	6	37
2016 election	27	1	1	8	—	0	37
2021 election	19	1	4	11	—	2	37
2026 election	11	1	2	7	15	1	37

== December 2000 election ==
The following table shows the results of the 2000 election.

Party	Ward			List			Total seats
Party	Votes	%	Seats	Votes	%	Seats	Total seats
Inkatha Freedom Party	22,009	73.59	16	21,956	73.13	11	27
African National Congress	6,735	22.52	3	6,769	22.55	6	9
Democratic Alliance	850	2.84	0	1,297	4.32	1	1
Independent candidates	312	1.04	0				0
Total	29,906	100.00	19	30,022	100.00	18	37
Valid votes	29,906	96.91		30,022	97.19		
Invalid/blank votes	952	3.09		868	2.81		
Total votes	30,858	100.00		30,890	100.00		
Registered voters/turnout	60,897	50.67		60,897	50.72		

== March 2006 election ==
The following table shows the results of the 2006 election.

Party	Ward			List			Total seats
Party	Votes	%	Seats	Votes	%	Seats	Total seats
African National Congress	16,482	49.16	10	16,777	49.96	8	18
Inkatha Freedom Party	15,201	45.34	9	14,789	44.04	8	17
Democratic Alliance	971	2.90	0	994	2.96	1	1
National Democratic Convention	874	2.61	0	1,021	3.04	1	1
Total	33,528	100.00	19	33,581	100.00	18	37
Valid votes	33,528	97.75		33,581	97.68		
Invalid/blank votes	770	2.25		799	2.32		
Total votes	34,298	100.00		34,380	100.00		
Registered voters/turnout	63,990	53.60		63,990	53.73		

== May 2011 election ==
The following table shows the results of the 2011 election.

Party	Ward			List			Total seats
Party	Votes	%	Seats	Votes	%	Seats	Total seats
African National Congress	26,558	65.75	19	27,553	68.27	6	25
Inkatha Freedom Party	5,872	14.54	0	5,700	14.12	5	5
National Freedom Party	5,823	14.42	0	5,589	13.85	5	5
Democratic Alliance	747	1.85	0	628	1.56	1	1
African People's Convention	370	0.92	0	388	0.96	1	1
Independent candidates	591	1.46	0				0
Congress of the People	194	0.48	0	191	0.47	0	0
Azanian People's Organisation	143	0.35	0	209	0.52	0	0
South African Democratic Congress	95	0.24	0	101	0.25	0	0
Total	40,393	100.00	19	40,359	100.00	18	37
Valid votes	40,393	97.86		40,359	98.04		
Invalid/blank votes	882	2.14		806	1.96		
Total votes	41,275	100.00		41,165	100.00		
Registered voters/turnout	63,889	64.60		63,889	64.43		

== August 2016 election ==
The following table shows the results of the 2016 election.

Party	Ward			List			Total seats
Party	Votes	%	Seats	Votes	%	Seats	Total seats
African National Congress	33,212	72.36	18	33,393	73.05	9	27
Inkatha Freedom Party	9,591	20.90	1	9,121	19.95	7	8
Economic Freedom Fighters	1,601	3.49	0	1,637	3.58	1	1
Democratic Alliance	801	1.75	0	758	1.66	1	1
African People's Convention	346	0.75	0	449	0.98	0	0
Azanian People's Organisation	183	0.40	0	134	0.29	0	0
Ubumbano Lwesizwe Sabangoni	159	0.35	0	106	0.23	0	0
People's Revolutionary Movement	3	0.01	0	113	0.25	0	0
Total	45,896	100.00	19	45,711	100.00	18	37
Valid votes	45,896	97.94		45,711	97.97		
Invalid/blank votes	967	2.06		947	2.03		
Total votes	46,863	100.00		46,658	100.00		
Registered voters/turnout	72,851	64.33		72,851	64.05		

== November 2021 election ==
The following table shows the results of the 2021 election.

Party	Ward			List			Total seats
Party	Votes	%	Seats	Votes	%	Seats	Total seats
African National Congress	20,579	53.93	16	19,803	50.56	3	19
Inkatha Freedom Party	9,757	25.57	3	12,272	31.33	8	11
Economic Freedom Fighters	3,982	10.44	0	3,695	9.43	4	4
African Freedom Revolution	611	1.60	0	556	1.42	1	1
Democratic Alliance	563	1.48	0	469	1.20	1	1
African Independent Congress	270	0.71	0	697	1.78	1	1
African Christian Democratic Party	389	1.02	0	364	0.93	0	0
Independent Alliance	341	0.89	0	403	1.03	0	0
National Freedom Party	314	0.82	0	280	0.71	0	0
Independent candidates	572	1.50	0				0
African Transformation Movement	255	0.67	0	207	0.53	0	0
United Independent Movement	272	0.71	0	185	0.47	0	0
African People First	127	0.33	0	128	0.33	0	0
Abantu Batho Congress	127	0.33	0	111	0.28	0	0
Total	38,159	100.00	19	39,170	100.00	18	37
Valid votes	38,159	95.46		39,170	97.35		
Invalid/blank votes	1,813	4.54		1,066	2.65		
Total votes	39,972	100.00		40,236	100.00		
Registered voters/turnout	73,368	54.48		73,368	54.84		

== November 2026 election ==
The following table shows the results of the 2026 election.

Party	Ward			List			Total seats
Party	Votes	%	Seats	Votes	%	Seats	Total seats
uMkhonto weSizwe Party	17,891	38.78	12	18,356	39.71	3	15
African National Congress	13,599	29.47	6	13,646	29.52	5	11
Inkatha Freedom Party	8,112	17.58	0	8,183	17.70	7	7
Economic Freedom Fighters	3,045	6.60	1	2,907	6.29	1	2
Democratic Alliance	684	1.48	0	723	1.56	1	1
Independent Alliance	661	1.43	0	651	1.41	1	1
African Independent Congress	615	1.33	0	449	0.97	0	0
African Transformation Movement	352	0.76	0	386	0.84	0	0
ActionSA	202	0.44	0	289	0.63	0	0
South African Communist Party	219	0.47	0	209	0.45	0	0
Independent candidates	282	0.61	0				0
KZN Independence	126	0.27	0	124	0.27	0	0
Afrika Mayibuye Movement	118	0.26	0	105	0.23	0	0
No Stress Party	127	0.28	0	90	0.19	0	0
National Freedom Party	92	0.20	0	102	0.22	0	0
African Renaissance Unity	14	0.03	0				0
Total	46,139	100.00	19	46,220	100.00	18	37
Valid votes	46,139	98.11		46,220	98.35		
Invalid/blank votes	889	1.89		775	1.65		
Total votes	47,028	100.00		46,995	100.00		
Registered voters/turnout	81,946	57.39		81,946	57.35		
