= Ozwathini =

- Location within KwaZulu-Natal Location within South Africa
- Coordinates: 29.393°S 30.946°E
- Country: South Africa
- Province: KwaZulu-Natal
- District: Ilembe
- Municipality: Ndwedwe

Area
  - Total: 9.15 km^{2} (3.53 sq mi)

Population (2001)
  - Total: 1,979
  - Density: 216/km^{2} (560/sq mi)

Racial makeup (2001)
  - Black African: 100%

First languages (2001)
  - Zulu: 100%
- Time zone: UTC+2 (SAST)

Ozwathini is a town in Ilembe District Municipality in the KwaZulu-Natal province of South Africa.

Appelsbosch hospital is located in this town.
