= Gert Oosthuizen =

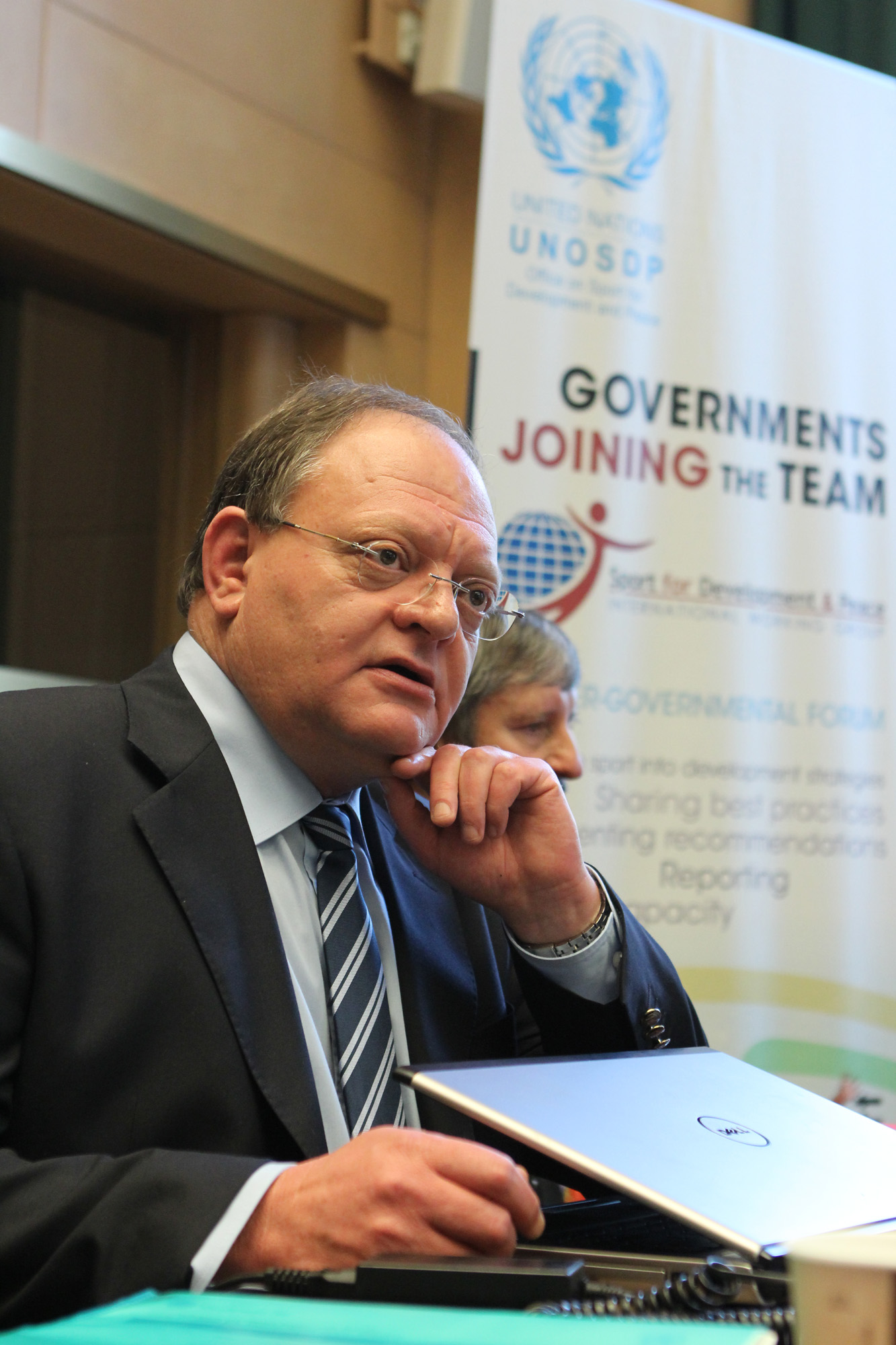
- Oosthuizen at the Sport for Development and Peace International Working Group in Geneva in October 2012

Deputy Minister of Sport and Recreation
- In office 10 May 2004 – 7 May 2019
- President: Thabo Mbeki; Kgalema Motlanthe; Jacob Zuma; Cyril Ramaphosa
- Minister: Arnold Stofile; Fikile Mbalula; Thulas Nxesi; Tokozile Xasa
- Succeeded by: Nocawe Mafu

Member of the National Assembly
- In office 16 February 2001 – 7 May 2019
- In office 9 May 1994 – 2 July 1999

Member of the House of Assembly

Assembly Member for Pretoria Central
- In office May 1987 – May 1994

Personal details
- Born: Gerhardus Cornelius Oosthuizen; 10 May 1957 (age 69)
- Citizenship: South Africa
- Party: African National Congress (since 2000)
- Other political affiliations: National Party (until 2000)
- Education: Rand Afrikaans University

Gerhardus Cornelius Oosthuizen (born 10 May 1957) is a South African politician who was the Deputy Minister of Sport and Recreation between May 2004 and May 2019. He served in the Parliament of South Africa continuously between May 1987 and May 2019, with the exception of a two-year hiatus between 1999 and 2001.

A former South African Air Force captain, Oosthuizen was elected to the apartheid-era House of Assembly as a member of the National Party in 1987. He remained in the National Assembly after the end of apartheid and defected to the African National Congress (ANC) in 2000. After the April 2004 general election, President Thabo Mbeki appointed him as the Deputy Minister of Sport and Recreation, and he remained in that position until the 2019 general election.

== Early life and career ==
Born on 10 May 1957, Oosthuizen matriculated in 1976 at Hoërskool Rustenburg in Rustenburg, where he played rugby for the First XV and at Craven Week. He attended the Rand Afrikaans University, completing a Bachelor of Arts in political science and an Honours degree in development studies. Thereafter, between 1980 and 1983, he served his mandatory military service in the South African Air Force, rising to the rank of captain. After his discharge he was self-employed until 1987.

== Legislative career ==
=== National Party: 1987–1999 ===
In the May 1987 general election, Oosthuizen was elected to represent the Pretoria Central constituency in the House of Assembly, the all-white house of the apartheid-era Tricameral Parliament. He became a whip for his party, the National Party (NP), in 1989. In the first post-apartheid elections of April 1994, he retained his parliamentary seat, now in the multi-racial National Assembly, and he continued to serve as a party whip. During this period, from 1994 to 2000, he was also the deputy chairperson of the NP's Pretoria branch.

=== African National Congress: 2001–2019 ===
Oosthuizen left the NP caucus at the June 1999 general election, and in October 2000 he became a member of the governing party, the African National Congress (ANC). Just over three months later, on 16 February 2001, he returned to the National Assembly, now as an ANC representative; he filled the casual vacancy that was created by Fihli Mbongo's death. Over the next three years he represented the ANC in the Portfolio Committee on Defence and Portfolio Committee on Correctional Services.

He was re-elected to a full term in his seat in the April 2004 general election, and in the aftermath of the election he was additionally appointed as Deputy Minister of Sport and Recreation. He was sworn in late – on his birthday, 10 May – because President Thabo Mbeki had initially offered the post to Vincent Ngema of the opposition Inkatha Freedom Party.

Oosthuizen went on to serve as deputy minister continuously through the rest of Mbeki's term, through the terms of Presidents Kgalema Motlanthe and Jacob Zuma, and through the first term of President Cyril Ramaphosa; he served under four different sports ministers (Arnold Stofile, Fikile Mbalula, Thulas Nxesi, and Tokozile Xasa). During that time, he was involved in South Africa's preparations to host the 2010 Soccer World Cup. He also represented South Africa as chairperson of the third session of the International Convention against Doping in Sport conference in 2011, and as chairperson of the Sport for Development and Peace International Working Group in 2011 and 2012.

Oosthuizen left the National Assembly at the May 2019 general election. President Ramaphosa appointed Nocawe Mafu to replace him as deputy minister.

== Retirement ==
In January 2021, the Sunday Times reported that Oosthuizen had been living in his ministerial residence in Waterkloof since his retirement. Later that year he was hospitalised with COVID-19.
