= Glendale Heights, South Africa =

Glendale Heights
- Location within KwaZulu-Natal Location within South Africa
- Coordinates: 29.332°S 31.118°E
- Country: South Africa
- Province: KwaZulu-Natal
- District: iLembe
- Municipality: Ndwedwe
- Main Place: Glendale

Area
  - Total: 2.79 km^{2} (1.08 sq mi)

Population (2011)
  - Total: 80
  - Density: 29/km^{2} (74/sq mi)

Racial makeup (2011)
  - Black African: 22.5%
  - Coloured: 1.3%
  - Indian/Asian: 76.3%

First languages (2011)
  - English: 74.7%
  - Zulu: 19.0%
  - Xhosa: 1.3%
  - Tswana: 1.3%
  - Other: 3.8%
- Time zone: UTC+2 (SAST)

Glendale Heights is a town in Ilembe District Municipality in the KwaZulu-Natal province of South Africa.
