= Boitumelo Moloi =

South African politician

The Honourable Boitumelo Moloi

Deputy Minister of Employment and Labour
- In office 29 May 2019 – 19 June 2024
- President: Cyril Ramaphosa
- Minister: Thulas Nxesi
- Preceded by: Patekile Holomisa
- Succeeded by: Phumzile Mgcina

Member of the National Assembly
- In office 22 May 2019 – 28 May 2024

Personal details
- Born: 28 December 1968 (age 57)
- Citizenship: South Africa
- Party: African National Congress

Boitumelo Elizabeth "Pinky" Moloi (born 28 December 1968) is a South African politician who served as the Deputy Minister of Employment and Labour. A member of the National Assembly from May 2019 until 2024, she was formerly the Executive Mayor of Dr Kenneth Kaunda District Municipality in the North West Province. She is a member of the African National Congress and served on the party's National Executive Committee between 2012 and 2022.

== Early life ==
Moloi was born on 28 December 1968.

== Early political career ==
She was the Executive Mayor of the North West's Dr Kenneth Kaunda District Municipality, previously known as Southern District Municipality, for several years. In January 2012, the local leadership of the African National Congress (ANC) in the region announced that it would "recall" Moloi – that is, it would withdraw its support for her leadership and endeavour to remove her from office if she did not resign. The local ANC told the press that Moloi was one of two mayors who were "not co-operating with the organisation [the ANC] and do things their own way". However, the Provincial Executive Committee of the ANC in the North West – a more senior body – reversed the decision. She remained in office as mayor as of July 2015.

At the party's 53rd National Conference in December 2012, Moloi was elected to a five year-term on the ANC National Executive Committee. She was re-elected at the 54th National Conference in December 2017, receiving the support of the North West branch of the ANC.

== Deputy Minister of Labour ==
She was elected as a Member of the National Assembly in the 2019 general election, ranked 62nd on the ANC's national party list. In the aftermath of the election, the ANC Women's League lobbied for Moloi's appointment as Premier of the North West. Instead, on 29 May 2019, President Cyril Ramaphosa announced that Moloi would be Deputy Minister of Employment and Labour, serving under Minister Thulas Nxesi. She was not re-elected to the ANC National Executive Committee when her term expired at the 55th National Conference in December 2022.

== Personal life ==
She was hospitalised on 5 January 2021 and tested positive for COVID-19.
