= Bongi Ntuli (politician) =

South African politician

Deputy Minister of Social Development
- In office 1 November 2010 – 25 May 2014
- Minister: Bathabile Dlamini
- Succeeded by: Hendrietta Bogopane-Zulu

Deputy Minister of Trade and Industry
- In office 11 May 2009 – 31 October 2010 Serving with Thandi Tobias
- Minister: Rob Davies

Member of the National Assembly
- In office May 1994 – 25 May 2014

Personal details
- Born: 1939/1940
- Died: 22 October 2016 (aged 76)
- Citizenship: South Africa
- Party: African National Congress

Bongi Maria Ntuli (died 22 October 2016) is a South African politician who represented the African National Congress (ANC) in the National Assembly from 1994 to 2014. Under President Jacob Zuma, she served as Deputy Minister of Social Development from 2010 to 2014, and before that she served as Deputy Minister of Trade and Industry from May 2009 to October 2010.

== Education and early career ==
Ntuli was born in 1939 or 1940 had a bachelor's degree in information systems from the University of the Western Cape. She participated in the Convention for a Democratic South Africa in the early 1990s.

== Legislative career ==
She was elected to the National Assembly in South Africa's first post-apartheid elections in 1994 and she gained re-election, representing the Mpumalanga constituency, in 1999 and 2004. She was also active in the ANC Women's League, serving on its national executive committee, and in the executive of her local party branch in Nkangala.

She was re-elected to the National Assembly in the 2009 general election, standing on the ANC's national list. In addition, after the election, newly elected President Jacob Zuma announced that she had been appointed as one of two Deputy Ministers of Trade and Industry; she served alongside Thandi Tobias and under Minister Rob Davies. She held that position until 31 October 2010, when, in a reshuffle by Zuma, she was moved to a new position as Deputy Minister of Social Development.

In the next general election in 2014, Ntuli was ranked 96th on the ANC's national party list and comfortably secured re-election to her legislative seat. However, shortly after she was sworn in, on 25 May, Zuma announced his second-term cabinet; Ntuli had been replaced as Deputy Minister of Social Development by Henrietta Bogopane-Zulu, and she resigned from the National Assembly the same day.

== Personal life and death ==
Ntuli was Christian and had two sons and a daughter. She died on 22 October 2016, aged 76, on arrival at the Pretoria Heart Hospital; she suffered congestive heart failure. President Zuma granted her a special official funeral.
