= Fihli Mbongo =

South African politician

Member of the National Assembly
- In office June 1999 – 29 December 2000
- Constituency: Gauteng

Personal details
- Born: Petrus Fihli Mbongo; 1 January 1968
- Died: 29 December 2000 (aged 32)
- Citizenship: South Africa
- Party: African National Congress

Petrus Fihli Mbongo (1 January 1968 – 29 December 2000) was a South African politician who represented the African National Congress (ANC) in the National Assembly from June 1999 until his death in December 2000. He served the Gauteng constituency.

== Life and career ==
Mbongo was born on 1 January 1968. During apartheid, he was sentenced to five years' imprisonment for possessing an illegal firearm and committing public violence during the Vaal uprising in Sebokeng in December 1984. He was indemnified of the offences during the negotiations to end apartheid.

In the 1999 general election, Mbongo was elected to an ANC seat in the National Assembly, representing the Gauteng constituency. He died while serving in his seat, on 29 December 2000, and was replaced by Gert Oosthuizen.
