= Ndwedwe =

- Location within KwaZulu-Natal Location within South Africa
- Coordinates: 29°30′53″S 30°56′06″E
- Country: South Africa
- Province: KwaZulu-Natal
- District: iLembe
- Municipality: Ndwedwe

Area
  - Total: 17.23 km^{2} (6.65 sq mi)

Population (2011)
  - Total: 4,488
  - Density: 260.5/km^{2} (674.6/sq mi)

Racial makeup (2011)
  - Black African: 99.5%
  - Indian/Asian: 0.3%
  - Other: 0.1%

First languages (2011)
  - Zulu: 94.1%
  - S. Ndebele: 1.5%
  - Tswana: 1.2%
  - English: 1.2%
  - Other: 2.0%
- Time zone: UTC+2 (SAST)
- Postal code (street): 4342
- PO box: 4342
- Area code: 032

Ndwedwe is a town in Ilembe District Municipality in the KwaZulu-Natal province of South Africa.

The village is 60 km north of Durban and about 20 km west-north-west of oThongathi. Of Zulu origin, the name is said to mean "long, bare table-land or ridge," or "pensive," referring to its peaceful setting in the Valley of a Thousand Hills.

== Notable residents ==
- Sihle Zikalala, 8th Premier of KwaZulu-Natal
