= Dean Macpherson =

South African politician (born 1985) and Minister for Public Works and Infrastructure

The Honourable Dean Macpherson
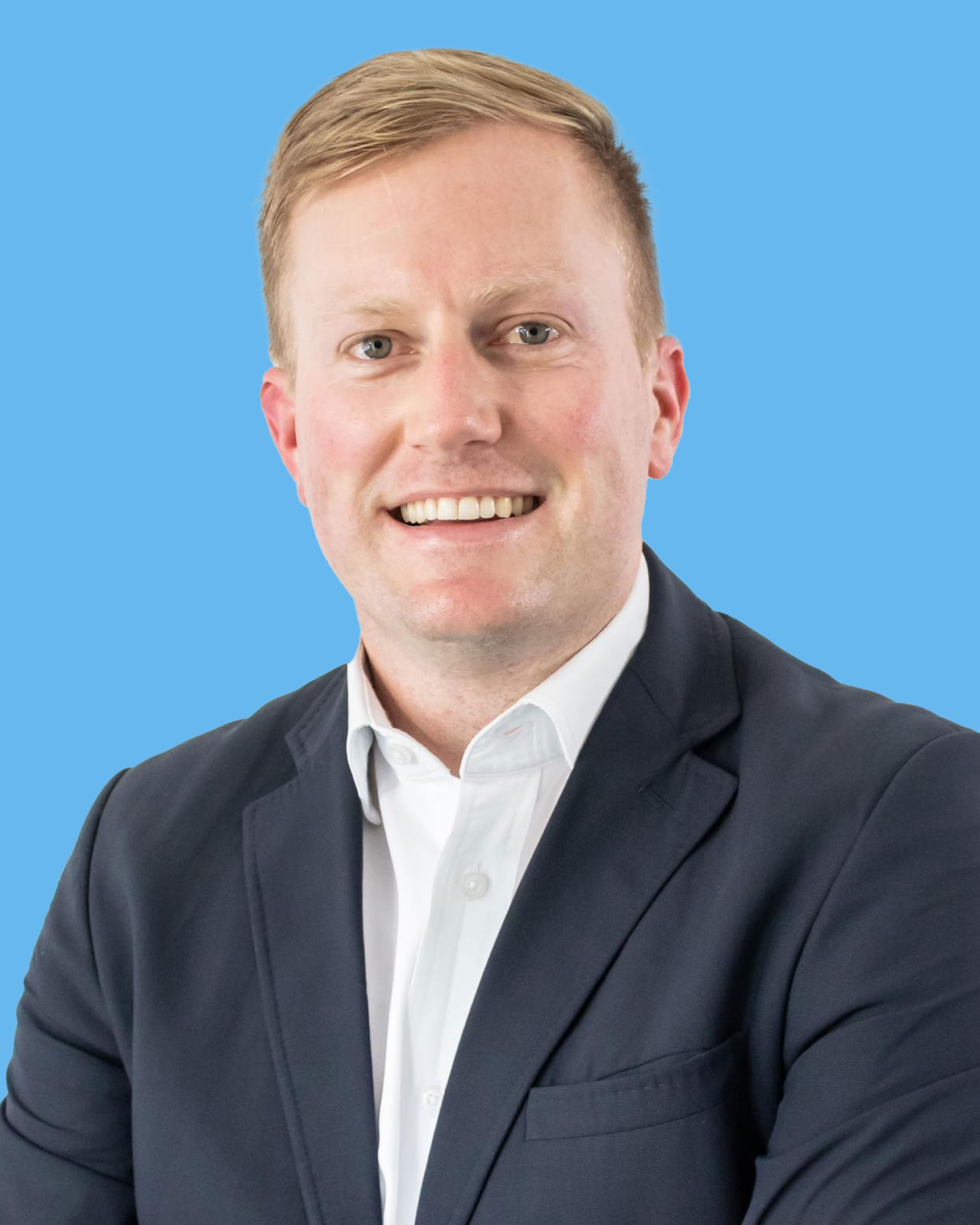
- Official portrait, 2024

Minister of Public Works and Infrastructure
- Incumbent
- Assumed office 3 July 2024
- President: Cyril Ramaphosa
- Preceded by: Sihle Zikalala

Shadow Minister for Trade and Industry
- In office 2014–2019

Personal details
- Born: Dean William Macpherson; February 2, 1985 (age 41) Durban, South Africa
- Party: Democratic Alliance

Dean William Macpherson (born 2 February 1985) is a South African politician who is currently serving as Minister of Public Works and Infrastructure since June 2024. He is a Member of Parliament for the Democratic Alliance and Provincial Chairperson in KwaZulu-Natal. Macpherson is from Durban, KwaZulu-Natal and currently resides in uMhlanga, just north of Durban.

== Early life ==
Macpherson grew up in Umhlanga, KwaZulu-Natal. His father, Rory Macpherson, immigrated from England in 1968, whereafter he was a councillor for the Democratic Alliance for Umhlanga. His mother Kerry Macpherson died suddenly of a brain aneurysm in 1999, when he was 14 years old.

He schooled at Crawford College La Lucia where he attained a National Senior Certificate, and has spoken publicly about how he was bullied.

== Political career ==
Macpherson has been a public representative since 2009, and served his first full term in the National Assembly from 2014 to 2019 and was re-elected to the National Assembly on 8 May 2019 to begin his second term.

From 2009 to 2014, Macpherson was the elected Ward Councillor for Durban North in the eThekwini Municipality where he served as the Chief Whip of the party until 2013.

He was the Shadow Deputy Minister for Trade and Industry from 2014 to 2017 before being promoted to Shadow Minister for Trade and Industry from 2017 to 2019. During this time, he piloted two Private Members’ Bills.

In 2020, he had a 64% committee attendance rate as a Member of Parliament (30 meetings out of 47).

=== KwaZulu-Natal DA Chairperson ===
On the 27th of March 2021, he was elected as the Chairperson of the Democratic Alliance in KwaZulu-Natal. During this time, he negotiated the signing of the DA-Inkatha Freedom Party Service Delivery Pact in July 2023 to improve service delivery in hung municipalities in KwaZulu-Natal which formed the basis for the negotiations of the Government of Provincial Unity in KwaZulu-Natal following the 2024 national elections.

==== 2021 municipal elections ====
On 7 October 2021, Macpherson issued a statement apologising and explaining his role in the controversial creation and placement of "racist" posters ahead of South Africa's 2021 Local Government Election.

The two posters read in order "The ANC called you racists" and "The DA calls you heroes" and were erected in Phoenix, KwaZulu-Natal. Phoenix was a hotspot for violence and racial tension during the 2021 South African unrest with 36 people losing their lives during looting and acts of vigilantism that was largely based on racial profiling.

Ntwenhle Mhlongo, the mother of Sanele Mngomezulu, one of the victims who was killed in Phoenix, said they felt insulted by the DA's campaign in an interview with Radio 702:

"As one of the Phoenix massacre victims, we feel so insulted by what the DA is saying... How can you call someone a hero, someone who just murdered someone in cold blood, who had no weapon?" "As far as I know, a hero is someone who is saving the world, who is saving someone, who is protecting someone. How can you call a murderer a hero?"

In his statement, Macpherson admitted the posters were "unsanctioned" by the DA's leadership or party structures and arranged for the removal of the posters. He apologized for his role in the controversy by saying "...the posters have regretfully caused hurt to some people. I am deeply sorry and apologise for this."

== National government ==
=== Minister of Public Works & Infrastructure ===
On 3 July 2024, he was appointed Minister of Public Works and Infrastructure in President Cyril Ramaphosa's national unity government. He promptly announced a halt on spending on accommodation and office space for members of parliament, proposing that the money instead be spent on infrastructure.

During his time in office, he introduced a number of cost-cutting measures, including that no new accommodation or offices will be procured for incoming Ministers and Deputy Ministers.

==== Independent Development Trust ====
On 10 December 2024, Macpherson launched a full independent investigation into the Independent Development Trust (IDT) after the Daily Maverick reported that the bulk of the R836-million Pressure-Swing Adsorption (PSA) Oxygen Plant tender was intended to go to a 'ghost company' that didn't possess the necessary accreditation to install such equipment. A subsequent investigation by PricewaterhouseCoopers found that multiple companies awarded contracts lacked proper certification, verifiable contact details, or legitimate operational capacity.

== Personal life ==
Macpherson is openly gay. He does not hold any tertiary qualifications; "a minister’s skill may not be limited to one’s educational background, and public or private sector experience is [seen as] a potential benefit to the position."
