= Minister of Public Works and Infrastructure =

South Africa

South Africa Minister of Public Works
- List: 10 other official names: Minister van Openbare Werke (Afrikaans); uNgqongqotjhe wezemiSebenzi yomBuso (Southern Ndebele); UMphathiswa wezeMisebenzi kaRhulumente (Xhosa); uNgqongqoshe Wezemisebenzi Yomphakathi (Zulu); Indvuna Letemisebenti Yesive (Swazi); Tona ya Mešomo ya Mmušo (Northern Sotho); Letona la Mesebetsi ya Setjhaba (Sotho); Tona la Ditiro tsa Setšhaba (Tswana); Holobye ya Mintirho ya Mfumo (Tsonga); Minisiṱa wa Mishumo ya Tshitshavha (Venda)
- Flag of South Africa

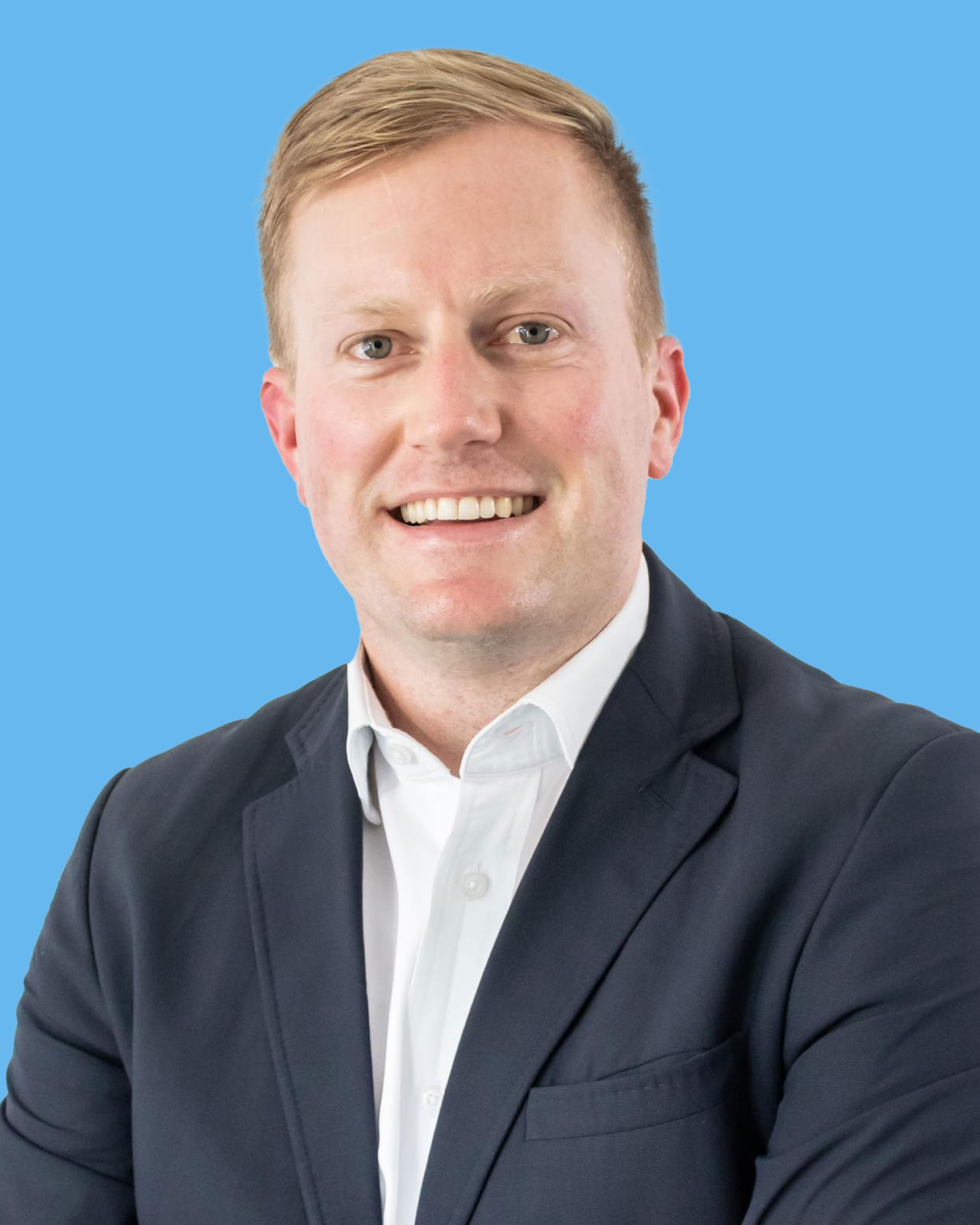
- Incumbent; Dean Macpherson since 30 June 2024
- Department of Public Works
- Style: The Honourable
- Appointer: Cyril Ramaphosa
- Inaugural holder: Sir David Graaf
- Formation: 31 May 1910
- Deputy: Sihle Zikalala
- Website: Department of Public Works

The minister of public works and infrastructure (formerly the minister of public works) is the minister of the South African government with political responsibility for South Africa's Department of Public Works. The current minister is Dean Macpherson, who was appointed by President Cyril Ramaphosa on 30 June 2024.

The ministry was created after the creation of the Union of South Africa as a British dominion in 1910.

== Ministers of Public Works ==
Minister	Party	Term	Under
George Bartlett	NP	1989–1991	Government of State President F. W. de Klerk
Leon Wessels	NP	1991–1992	Government of State President F. W. de Klerk
Gene Louw	NP	1992–1993	Government of State President F. W. de Klerk
Louis Shill	NP	1993–1994	Government of State President F. W. de Klerk
Jeff Radebe	ANC	11 May 1994 – 16 June 1999	Government of President Nelson Mandela
Stella Sigcau	ANC	17 June 1999 – 7 May 2006	Government of President Thabo Mbeki
Thoko Didiza	ANC	22 May 2006 - 25 September 2008	Government of President Thabo Mbeki
Geoff Doidge	ANC	25 September 2008 – 11 May 2009	Government of President Kgalema Motlanthe
Geoff Doidge	ANC	11 May 2009 - 1 November 2010	Government of President Jacob Zuma
Gwen Mahlangu-Nkabinde	ANC	1 November 2010 - 24 October 2011	Government of President Jacob Zuma
Thulas Nxesi	ANC	24 October 2011 – 30 March 2017	Government of President Jacob Zuma
Nathi Nhleko	ANC	30 March 2017 – 26 February 2018	Government of President Jacob Zuma
Thulas Nxesi	ANC	26 February 2018 - 29 May 2019	Government of President Cyril Ramaphosa
Patricia de Lille	GOOD	30 May 2019 – 6 March 2023	Government of President Cyril Ramaphosa
Sihle Zikalala	ANC	7 March 2023 – 14 June 2024	Government of President Cyril Ramaphosa
Dean Macpherson	DA	30 June 2024 – Present	Government of President Cyril Ramaphosa
