= Sihle Zikalala =

South African politician (born 1973)

The Honourable Sihle Zikalala MP
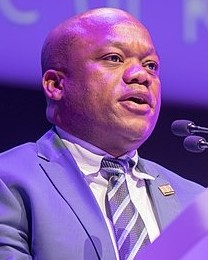
- Zikalala in 2018

Deputy Minister of Public Works and Infrastructure
- Incumbent
- Assumed office 3 July 2024
- President: Cyril Ramaphosa
- Minister: Dean Macpherson
- Preceded by: Bernice Swarts

Minister of Public Works and Infrastructure
- In office 7 March 2023 – 30 June 2024
- President: Cyril Ramaphosa
- Deputy: Bernice Swarts
- Preceded by: Patricia de Lille
- Succeeded by: Dean Macpherson

Member of the National Assembly of South Africa
- Incumbent
- Assumed office 6 February 2023
- Preceded by: Mervyn Dirks
- Constituency: KwaZulu-Natal

8th Premier of KwaZulu-Natal
- In office 27 May 2019 – 5 August 2022
- Monarchs: Goodwill Zwelithini; Misuzulu
- Preceded by: Willies Mchunu
- Succeeded by: Nomusa Dube-Ncube

KwaZulu-Natal MEC for Cooperative Governance and Traditional Affairs
- In office 11 August 2022 – 31 January 2023
- Premier: Nomusa Dube-Ncube
- Preceded by: Sipho Hlomuka
- Succeeded by: Bongi Sithole-Moloi

KwaZulu-Natal MEC for Economic Development, Tourism and Environmental Affairs
- In office 7 June 2016 – 27 May 2019
- Premier: Willies Mchunu
- Preceded by: Mike Mabuyakhulu
- Succeeded by: Nomusa Dube-Ncube

Provincial Chairperson of the African National Congress in KwaZulu-Natal
- In office 8 November 2015 – 23 July 2022
- Deputy: Willies Mchunu
- Preceded by: Senzo Mchunu
- Succeeded by: Siboniso Duma

Member of the KwaZulu-Natal Legislature
- In office 26 November 2015 – 31 January 2023

Personal details
- Born: 6 August 1973 (age 53) Ndwedwe, South Africa
- Party: African National Congress
- Spouse: Nelly Zikalala (m. 2006)
- Education: University of KwaZulu-Natal
- Occupation: Politician

Sihle Zikalala (born 6 August 1973) is a South African politician from KwaZulu-Natal who has been a Member of the National Assembly of South Africa since 2023, representing the African National Congress. He was Minister of Public Works and Infrastructure from March 2023 to June 2024. Before his redeployment to the national government, he had been the Member of the Executive Council (MEC) for Cooperative Governance and Traditional Affairs in KwaZulu-Natal and a Member of the KwaZulu-Natal Legislature.

He served as the 8th Premier of KwaZulu-Natal from 2019 until his resignation in 2022 and as the Provincial Chairperson of the African National Congress from 2015 to 2022. He has held various leadership positions in the ANC. From 2016 to 2019, he served as the MEC for Economic Development, Tourism and Environmental Affairs in the KwaZulu-Natal Provincial Government.

== Early life and education ==
Sihle Zikalala was born on 6 August 1973 in the town of Ndwedwe in Natal. He holds a Bachelor of Arts in Communication Science. In April 2017, he achieved a Bachelor of Administration Honours cum laude from the University of KwaZulu-Natal. Zikalala obtained a master's degree in commerce from the Graduate School of Business and Leadership in 2019.

== Political career ==
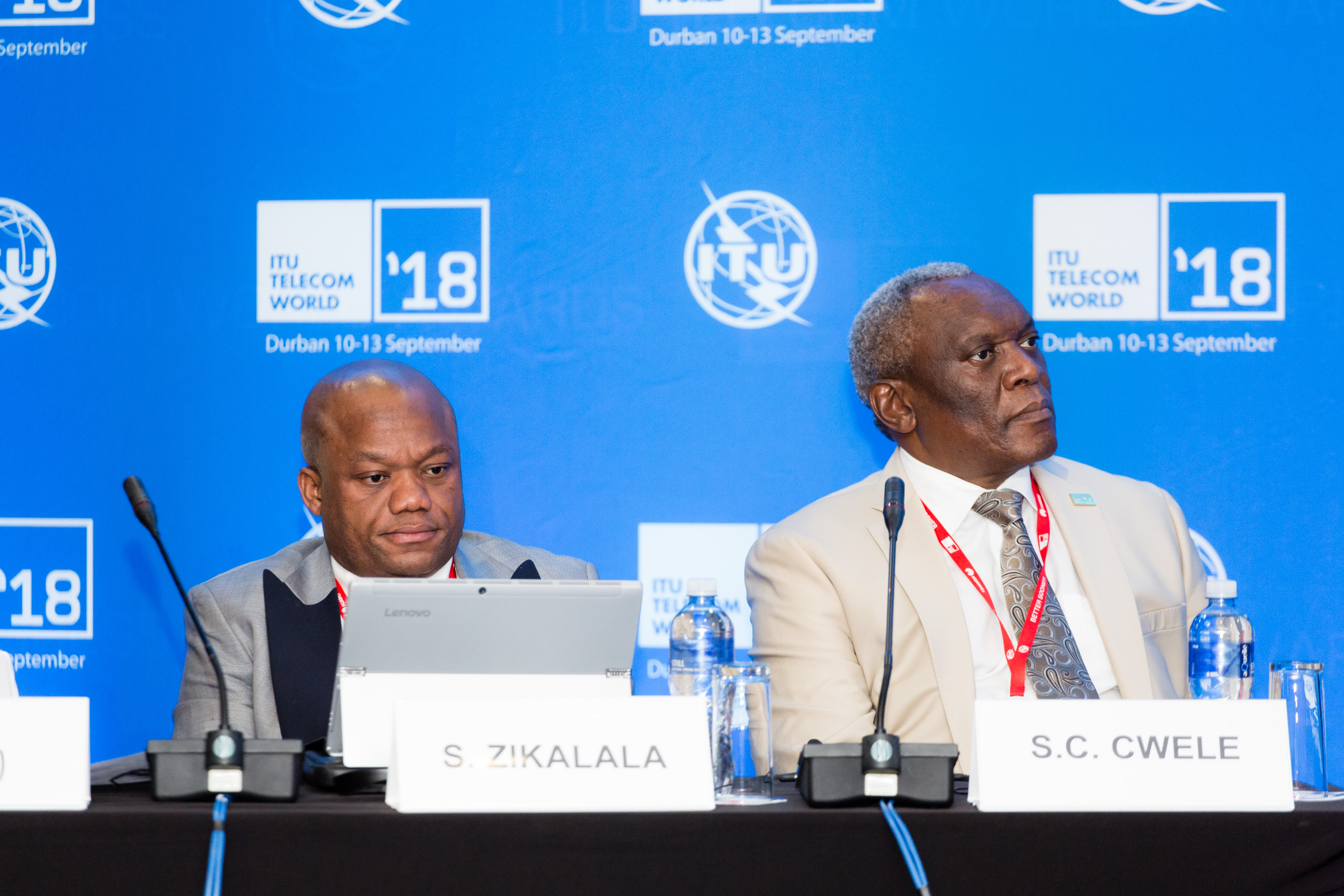
Zikalala and Minister Siyabonga Cwele at the 2018 ITU Telecom World Conference

Zikalala joined the African National Congress (ANC) in 1990 and became a full-time organiser for the party in Ndwedwe between 1993 and 1994. He initially established structures for the party. He has held many leadership positions in the African National Congress. Zikalala was a member of the party's Million Meyiwa Branch and served as ANC Zonal Chairperson from 1995 to 1996, before his election to the ANCYL North Durban Regional Executive Committee later on in 1996. He soon became Regional Chairperson in 1997, a post he held until his election as ANCYL Provincial Secretary in 2000.

Zikalala served as a councillor in the Ilembe District Municipality from 1996 to 2000.

He was elected Secretary-General of the African National Congress Youth League in 2004. In 2008, he was elected Deputy Provincial Secretary of the ANC KwaZulu-Natal structure and soon became Provincial Secretary in 2009.

Zikalala was elected ANC Provincial Chairperson on 8 November 2015 after he defeated incumbent Senzo Mchunu by a margin of 105 votes. He received 780 votes out of a total of 1,459 votes. Super Zuma succeeded Zikalala as Provincial Secretary.

He was sworn in as a Member of the KwaZulu-Natal Legislature on 26 November 2015 and consequently filled the vacancy created by the resignation of Super Zuma. Following his swearing-in as an MPL, opposition parties staged a walkout of the legislative chamber over Zikalala's decision to sit in the seat that is traditionally reserved for the Premier.

On 6 June 2016, the newly elected Premier of KwaZulu-Natal, Willies Mchunu, appointed Zikalala to the position of MEC for Economic Development, Tourism and Environmental Affairs. He assumed office on 7 June 2016 and succeeded Michael Mabuyakhulu. He was also appointed as Leader of Government Business in the legislature.

Zikalala was re-elected unopposed for a second term as Provincial Chairperson of the party in July 2018.

== Premiership ==
Following the May 2019 elections, Zikalala was selected as the party's KwaZulu-Natal Premier candidate, succeeding Willies Mchunu. He was elected to the office on 22 May 2019, and officially assumed the post on 27 May 2019. Following his inauguration, he announced his Executive Council, which consisted of youthful members.

On 8 July 2021, Zikalala admitted that the incarceration of former president Jacob Zuma would hurt the ANC's electoral chances in the November 2021 municipal elections. He commended the former president for handing himself over and said that he has never betrayed Zuma. Zikalala suggested that president Cyril Ramaphosa should consider granting Zuma a Presidential Pardon. The Democratic Alliance, an opposition party, subsequently accused him of abusing his position by asking Ramaphosa to grant Zuma a pardon. Zikalala called on Zuma supporters to refrain from violence as pro-Zuma protests turned violent.

On 15 July 2021, he was filmed allegedly assaulting an individual during the unrest in KwaZulu-Natal.

During a law enforcement operation on Bayhead Road leading to the Durban Harbour on 13 January 2022, Zikalala condemned the proliferation of counterfeit goods. He said that it was tantamount to economic sabotage. Zikalala said that the police had confiscated an estimated R1-billion worth of counterfeit goods over the past year. Zikalala also called on the freight and trucking industry to prioritise employing South African truck drivers instead of hiring foreign nationals to avoid conflict.

In March 2022, Zikalala called for a review of South Africa's constitutional democracy and advocated for a move towards a parliamentary democracy. Zikalala's call was described as a "dangerous, populist call steeped in political expediency".

In April 2022, days of heavy rainfall caused deadly floods in KwaZulu-Natal which damaged critical infrastructure in the province and led to the deaths of more than 300 people. After a late emergency meeting of the provincial executive council on 12 April 2022, Zikalala asked for a declaration of emergency so that the provincial government could gain access to emergency funding. On 13 April, a provincial state of disaster was declared in KwaZulu-Natal by the National Disaster Management Centre, which Zikalala welcomed.

During the State of Emergency declared after the deadly floods, he controversially admitted that a water tanker delivered water to his personal residence to fill up the water tank on the premise. He vowed that it would never happen again - and that the tanker would be positioned at the local community hall for residents to retrieve water during the crisis.

On 23 July 2022, Zikalala was defeated in the election for ANC provincial chairperson by MPL Siboniso Duma. He received only 665 votes to Duma's 930 votes. Members of Zikalala's "Ankole" slate also lost to members of Duma's "Taliban" faction in the elections for other provincial leadership positions. After the election results were announced, the newly elected provincial chairperson Duma said that Zikalala would not be removed as premier anytime soon. Zikalala was not re-elected to the provincial executive committee.

On 5 August 2022, Zikalala's intention to resign as premier of KwaZulu-Natal became apparent. He had told the ANC provincial leadership of his decision to step down, which they accepted. Zikalala resigned as premier on the same day. He was replaced by the MEC for Finance, Nomusa Dube-Ncube on 10 August.

== Later political career ==
On 11 August 2022, Dube-Ncube announced that Zikalala had been appointed as the Member of the Executive Council for Cooperative Governance and Traditional Affairs.

=== ANC National Executive Committee ===
On 22 November 2022, the ANC Electoral Committee revealed that Zikalala had topped the list of 200 people who were nominated for a position on the National Executive Committee of the African National Congress ahead of the party's 55th National Conference to be held from 16–20 December 2022. Zikalala had received a total of 1,447 branch nominations. On 21 December 2022, it was revealed that Zikalala had received the most votes from party delegates to the National Executive Committee, and had thus secured a seat on the NEC as an additional member. He will serve on the NEC for the 2022–2027 term.

=== National Assembly ===
On 30 January 2023, the ANC in KwaZulu-Natal announced that Zikalala would be deployed to the National Assembly amid talks of a cabinet reshuffle by president Cyril Ramaphosa after his re-election at the party's National Conference in December 2022. He resigned from the provincial legislature the following day. Zikalala was sworn in as a member of the National Assembly on 6 February.

=== Minister of Public Works and Infrastructure ===
During a cabinet reshuffle on 6 March 2023, Zikalala was appointed as Minister of Public Works and Infrastructure. He was sworn in the following day.

== Personal life ==
Zikalala married Nelly Zikalala in April 2006. They have two sons and one daughter.

Political offices
Preceded by Patricia de Lille	Minister of Public Works and Infrastructure; 2023–2024	Incumbent
Preceded by Sipho Hlomuka	KwaZulu-Natal MEC for Cooperative Governance and Traditional Affairs; 2022–2023	Succeeded by Bongi Sithole-Moloi
Preceded by Willies Mchunu	8th Premier of KwaZulu-Natal; 2019–2022	Succeeded by Nomusa Dube-Ncube
Preceded by Mike Mabuyakhu	KwaZulu-Natal MEC for Economic Development, Tourism and Environmental Affairs; 2016–2019	Succeeded by Nomusa Dube-Ncube
Party political offices
Preceded by Senzo Mchunu	Provincial Chairperson of the African National Congress; 2015–2022	Succeeded by Siboniso Duma
