= Nocawe Mafu =

South African politician

Nocawe Mafu MP

Deputy Minister of Sports, Arts and Culture
- Incumbent
- Assumed office 30 May 2019
- President: Cyril Ramaphosa
- Preceded by: Office established (Maggie Sotyu as Deputy Minister of Arts and Culture, Gert Oosthuizen as Deputy Minister of Sport and Recreation)

Chairperson of the Portfolio Committee on Human Settlements
- In office 24 June 2014 – 7 May 2019
- Preceded by: Beauty Nomhle Dambuza
- Succeeded by: Committee abolished

Member of the National Assembly of South Africa
- Incumbent
- Assumed office 21 May 2014

Personal details
- Born: Nocawe Noncedo Mafu
- Party: African National Congress
- Profession: Politician

Nocawe Noncedo Mafu is a South African politician currently serving as Deputy Minister of Sports, Arts and Culture. She has been a member of the National Assembly since 2014. She was Chairperson of the Portfolio Committee on Human Settlements from 2014 to 2019. Mafu is a member of the African National Congress.

== Political career ==
Mafu stood for election to the South African National Assembly in 2014 as 102nd on the ANC's national list. At the election, she won a seat in the National Assembly. Upon election, Mafu was elected as the chairperson of the Portfolio Committee on Human Settlements.

In 2017 Mafu was elected to the National Executive Committee of the African National Congress during the 54th National Conference of the African National Congress. At the conference, Mafu gave feedback on discussions about social transformation and said that ANC branches need to play a more important role in ensuring social cohesion in communities.

In 2019 Mafu stood for re-election at 33rd on the ANC list. She was re-elected at the election. A lot of African National Congress Youth League members were also elected to parliament at the election. Mafu said that this ensured that the youth league had a 'voice in the corridors of power'. She was then appointed as Deputy Minister of Sports, Arts and Culture by president Cyril Ramaphosa.

In February 2021, the process to change the name of Cape Town International Airport had been stopped due to no consensus being reached during the public consultation process. There were proposals for the airport to be renamed after the late anti-apartheid activist Winnie Madikizela-Mandela and Mafu had said in March 2019 that Madikizela-Mandela's name was number one on the list of names being considered.

In May 2021, the Russian government and the Russian Olympic Committee offered to vaccinate African nations, including South Africa, going to the delayed 2020 Summer Olympics in July 2021 with the Russian Sputnik V COVID-19 vaccine. Mafu confirmed this offer during a parliamentary committee meeting and said that if the vaccine is approved, there is no reason why 'Sascoc and everybody else should not use it'.
