= Mahlengi Bhengu =

South African politician

National Spokesperson of the African National Congress
- Incumbent
- Assumed office 27 January 2023
- President: Cyril Ramaphosa
- Preceded by: Pule Mabe

Personal details
- Born: Natal Province, South Africa
- Party: African National Congress
- Education: University of KwaZulu-Natal

Mahlengi Bhengu-Motsiri is a South African politician who is currently serving as spokesperson of the African National Congress (ANC), South Africa's governing party. A former ANC Youth League activist, she was appointed as spokesperson in January 2023, shortly after her election to the ANC's National Executive Committee at the party's 55th National Conference.

== Early life and career ==
Bhengu was born in present-day KwaZulu-Natal and has a Bachelor's degree in public administration from the University of KwaZulu-Natal. Her political career began in the women's and youth wings of the anti-apartheid movement; she was a member of the Natal Organisation of Women and served as Secretary-General of the South African Students Congress (SASCO) from 1992 to 1994. In July 1996, the first post-apartheid president, Nelson Mandela, appointed her to a five-year term as chairperson of the National Youth Commission.

Bhengu was also active in the African National Congress (ANC) Youth League and later served on the league's National Executive Committee. In 2001, she was a prominent supporter of David Makhura's unsuccessful campaign to unseat Malusi Gigaba as ANC Youth League President.

She subsequently worked in public administration in the Gauteng Provincial Legislature and as a management consultant in the private sector. By 2022, she was chairperson of the board of the Gauteng Partnership Fund, a state-owned enterprise. She also remained active in the ANC: in April 2019, she was appointed to the inaugural board of the ANC's new political school, the O. R. Tambo School of Leadership, and in March 2022 she was appointed as member of the ANC's internal Renewal Commission, chaired by Thoko Didiza.

== ANC spokesperson: 2023–present ==
At the ANC's 55th National Conference in December 2022, Motsiri was elected to a five-year term on the party's National Executive Committee (NEC); by number of votes received, she was ranked 70th of the 80 candidates elected, receiving 1,038 votes across the 4,029 ballots cast in total.

On 27 January 2023, the NEC elected her to succeed Pule Mabe as the party's national spokesperson. She will serve in the position, a full-time job based out of Luthuli House, until the NEC's term ends in 2027.
