= Vatiswa Bam-Mugwanya =

South African politician

Member of the National Assembly of South Africa
- In office 6 May 2009 – 7 May 2019

Personal details
- Party: African National Congress

Vatiswa Bam-Mugwanya is a South African politician who served as a Member of Parliament for the African National Congress from 2009 to 2019. She was elected in the 2009 and 2014 general elections. During her tenure, she was a member of various committees, including the Joint Standing Committee on Intelligence and the Portfolio Committee on Tourism in her first term, and the Portfolio Committee on Human Settlements in her second term. Bam-Mugwanya did not appear on any ANC candidate lists for the 2019 general election and subsequently left parliament.
