= Gwen Mahlangu-Nkabinde =

South African politician

Gwendoline Lindiwe Mahlangu-Nkabinde

Minister of Public Works
- In office 1 November 2010 – 24 October 2011
- President: Jacob Zuma
- Preceded by: Geoff Doidge
- Succeeded by: Thembelani Nxesi

Speaker of the National Assembly of South Africa
- In office 25 September 2008 – 6 May 2009
- Preceded by: Baleka Mbete
- Succeeded by: Max Sisulu

Personal details
- Born: 16 August 1955 (age 70) Union of South Africa
- Party: African National Congress

Gwendoline Lindiwe "Gwen" Mahlangu-Nkabinde (born 16 August 1955) is a South African politician who was Speaker of the National Assembly of South Africa from 2008 to 2009. She became Deputy Speaker on 23 April 2004 and was later elected as Speaker on 25 September 2008; in the latter post, she succeeded Baleka Mbete, who was appointed as Deputy President of South Africa, and Mahlangu-Nkabinde was in turn succeeded as Deputy Speaker by former Deputy Health Minister Nozizwe Madlala-Routledge. Following the April 2009 general election, she was replaced as Speaker by Max Sisulu on 6 May 2009.

She was appointed Minister of Public Works on 1 November 2010 until she was replaced for her role in the Police lease scandal in 2011. Prior to that, she had served as Deputy Minister of Economic Development from 11 May 2009 to 30 October 2010.

== Other positions ==
=== Current ===
- Chairperson, Disciplinary Committee of the National Assembly

=== Former ===
- Chairperson, Portfolio Committee on Environmental Affairs and Tourism
- Vice-president, Inter-Parliamentary Union (IPU) Co-ordinating Committee of Women Parliamentarians
- executive member of the IPU
- President of GLOBE (The Global Legislators Organisation) Southern Africa (2002–2004)
- Co-president Stakeholder Forum for a Sustainable Future (2001–2005)
