= Mildred Oliphant =

South African politician (born 1959)

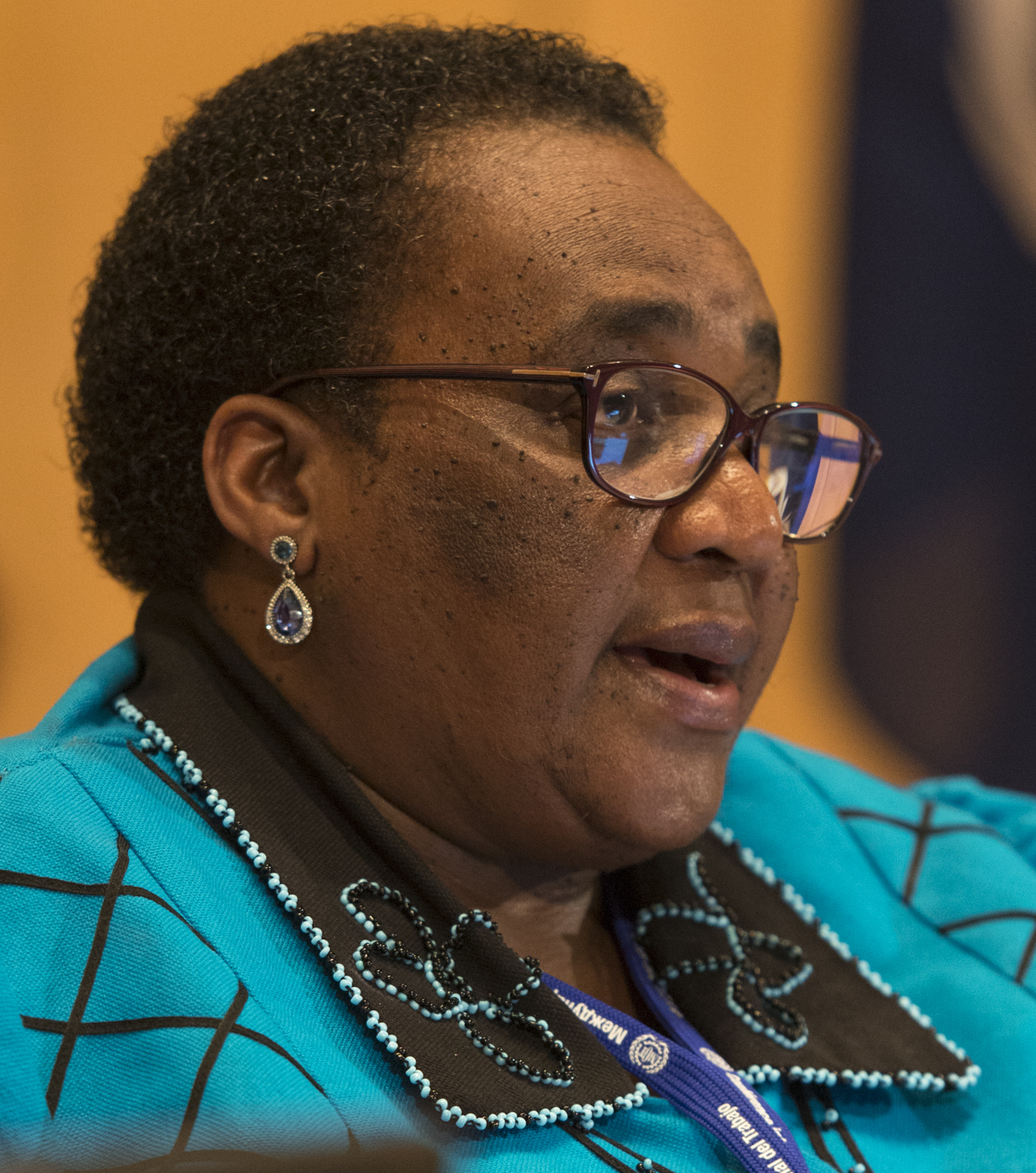
- Mildred Oliphant in 2016

Minister of Labour
- In office 1 November 2010 – 29 May 2019
- President: Jacob Zuma; Cyril Ramaphosa
- Deputy: Sango Patekile Holomisa
- Preceded by: Membathisi Mdladlana
- Succeeded by: Thulas Nxesi

Personal details
- Born: 22 March 1959 (age 67) KwaZulu-Natal, South Africa

Mildred Nelisiwe Oliphant (born 22 March 1959), formerly known as Mildred Buthelezi, was South Africa's Minister of Labour from October 2010 to May 2019. She left Parliament after the 2019 general election.
