= Thandi Tobias =

South African politician

Deputy Minister of Trade and Industry
- In office 11 May 2009 – 25 May 2014
- President: Jacob Zuma

Member of the National Assembly of South Africa
- In office 15 March 2023 – 28 May 2024
- In office 23 April 2004 – 7 May 2019

Personal details
- Born: Thandi Vivian Tobias
- Party: African National Congress
- Education: University of the Western Cape; University of South Africa; Rhodes University
- Profession: Politician

Thandi Vivian Tobias is a South African politician who served as a Member of the National Assembly from 2004 to 2019 and again from 2023 until 2024. She served as Deputy Minister of Trade and Industry from 2009 until 2014. Tobias is a member of the African National Congress.

== Education ==
Tobias holds an Advanced Diploma in Economic Policy from the University of the Western Cape and a certificate in Economics and Public Finance from the University of South Africa as well as a certificate in Leadership Communication at Rhodes University.

== Political career ==
Tobias formerly served on the National Executive Committee of the African National Congress as well as the National Executive Committee of the African National Congress Youth League.

== Parliamentary career ==
=== Member of the National Assembly: 2004–2019 ===
Tobias was elected an ANC MP in the National Assembly of South Africa in the 2004 general election. Having entered parliament, Tobias became a member of the Standing Committee on Public Accounts. The following year, she was elected chairperson of the Standing Committee on Defence. On 12 September 2007, she was elected chairperson of the Portfolio Committee on Public Works in absentia.

Following the 2009 general election, Tobias was appointed as one of two Deputy Ministers of Trade and Industry by president Jacob Zuma. Tobias nearly missed a flight to Brussels in November 2009 after her 2005 Mercedes Benz E 350, which she inherited from former minister Mandisi Mpahlwa, broke down on the way to the airport.

Tobias was not reappointed as Deputy Minister of Trade and Industry after the 2014 general election and she returned to being a banckbencher. In 2017, she was appointed as whip of the Standing Committee on Finance. After the National Assembly approved a proposal to amend the laws governing the Public Investment Corporation (PIC) in May 2018, Tobias was quoted as saying: "Some of the clauses in the legislation will ensure compulsory and annual submission of both listed and unlisted investments by the Minister of Finance to table in Parliament through the annual report of his department. Therefore there will be no conspicuous investment hidden under unlisted investments which will escape public scrutiny." Tobias was not listed as a parliamentary candidate for the 2019 general election and left parliament as a result.

=== Return to the National Assembly: 2023 ===
On 15 March 2023, Tobias was sworn in as a Member of the National Assembly by Deputy Speaker Lechesa Tsenoli. She was ranked too low on the ANC's regional free State list to secure reelection in 2024.

== Chair of the Board of Trustees of Brand South Africa ==
During a cabinet meeting in October 2019, Tobias was appointed to serve as chairperson of the Board of Trustees of the Brand South Africa Trust. On 12 March 2021, former Brand South Africa CEO Kingsley Makhubela lodged a complaint with National Assembly Speaker Thandi Modise after Tobias allegedly said during a meeting of the Portfolio Committee on Public Service and Administration that Makhubela was fired due to a charge of misconduct by Brand South Africa; the complaint was referred to the Power and Privileges Committee of Parliament twelve days later.
