= Thulas Nxesi =

South African politician (born 1959)

The Honourable Thulas Nxesi
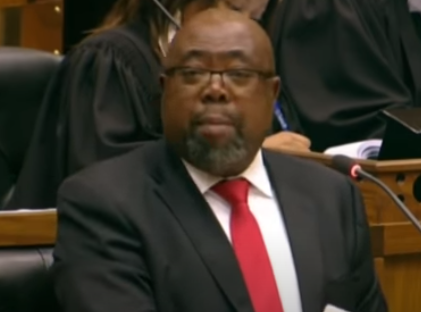
- Nxesi in Parliament in September 2019

Minister of Employment and Labour
- In office 30 May 2019 – 19 June 2024
- President: Cyril Ramaphosa
- Deputy: Boitumelo Moloi
- Preceded by: Mildred Oliphant
- Succeeded by: Nomakhosazana Meth

Member of the National Assembly
- In office 6 May 2009 – 28 May 2024

Deputy National Chairperson of the South African Communist Party
- Incumbent
- Assumed office July 2012
- General Secretary: Solly Mapaila; Blade Nzimande
- National Chairperson: Blade Nzimande; Senzeni Zokwana
- Preceded by: Joyce Moloi
Prior offices
Acting Minister of Public Service and Administration
In office 4 April 2022 – 7 March 2023
President	Cyril Ramaphosa
Preceded by	Ayanda Dlodlo
Succeeded by	Noxolo Kiviet
Minister of Public Works
In office 28 February 2018 – 29 May 2019
President	Cyril Ramaphosa
Preceded by	Nathi Nhleko
Succeeded by	Patricia de Lille
In office 24 October 2011 – 31 March 2017
President	Jacob Zuma
Preceded by	Gwen Mahlangu-Nkabinde
Succeeded by	Nathi Nhleko
Minister of Sport and Recreation
In office 31 March 2017 – 28 February 2018
President	Jacob Zuma; Cyril Ramaphosa
Preceded by	Fikile Mbalula
Succeeded by	Tokozile Xasa
Deputy Minister of Rural Development and Land Reform
In office 1 November 2010 – 24 October 2011
President	Jacob Zuma
Minister	Gugile Nkwinti
Union offices 1995–2009
President of Education International
In office 2004–2009
Preceded by	Mary Hatwood Futrell
Succeeded by	Susan Hopgood
General Secretary of the South African Democratic Teachers' Union
In office 1995–2009

Personal details
- Born: Thembelani Waltermade Nxesi; 9 June 1959 (age 67) Matatiele, Cape Province; Union of South Africa
- Party: African National Congress
- Other political affiliations: South African Communist Party
- Spouse: Sesi Nxesi
- Education: University of Fort Hare; Witwatersrand University
- Nickname: Thulas

Thembelani Waltermade "Thulas" Nxesi (born 9 June 1959) is a South African politician and former trade unionist who was the Minister of Employment and Labour from May 2019 to June 2024. A representative of the African National Congress (ANC), he has been a member of cabinet since October 2011 and the Deputy National Chairperson of the South African Communist Party (SACP) since July 2012.

A teacher by profession, Nxesi rose to prominence as the General Secretary of the South African Democratic Teachers' Union from 1995 to 2009. He was also the President of Education International between 2004 and 2009. He entered the National Assembly at the 2009 general election, and in 2010 he was appointed as Deputy Minister of Rural Development and Land Reform in the government of President Jacob Zuma. The following year, Zuma promoted him to the cabinet, first as Minister of Public Works from 2011 to 2017 and then as Minister of Sport and Recreation from 2017 to 2018. Under Zuma's successor, President Cyril Ramaphosa, Nxesi returned briefly to the Ministry of Public Works in 2018 before he was appointed to his current position in 2019. He was also Acting Minister of Public Service and Administration from April 2022 to March 2023. Nxesi was ranked too low on the ANC's national list to be re-elected to Parliament at the 2024 general election.

Nxesi was a member of the ANC National Executive Committee from 2012 to 2017, and he was elected to his third five-year term as SACP Deputy National Chairperson in July 2022.

== Early life and education ==
Nxesi was born on 1 January 1959 in Matatiele in the former Cape Province. Schooled at the height of apartheid, he was politically active from a young age as a student activist in the Azanian Students' Organisation and its successor, the South African National Student Congress; he was expelled from school on several occasions for his political activities. He graduated from the University of Fort Hare with a Bachelor of Arts in 1983, and he later completed a Bachelor of Education at Witwatersrand University and a higher diploma in education at the University of South Africa.

== Trade union career ==
In 1985, he took up a teaching job at Ikusasa Senior Secondary School in Tembisa in the former Transvaal. He headed the school's social studies department until 1990. During that period, he was a founding member and ultimately secretary of the National Education Union of South Africa, which was later merged into the South African Democratic Teachers' Union (Sadtu).

In 1990, Nxesi was elected as Assistant General Secretary of the newly formed Sadtu, and he was elected as General Secretary in 1995. During his tenure in the secretariat, which lasted until 2009, Sadtu became one of the largest affiliates of the Congress of South African Trade Unions (Cosatu). In addition, from 2004 to 2009, Nxesi was the President of Education International, a global federation of teachers' unions.

== Zuma presidency ==
In the 2009 general election, Nxesi won election to a seat in the National Assembly, the lower house of the South African Parliament; he stood as a candidate for the African National Congress (ANC), Cosatu's Tripartite Alliance partner. He was one of three unionists – the others being Alina Rantsolase and Noluthando Mayende-Sibiya – who represented the ANC by way of the Tripartite Alliance. In the aftermath of the election, the ANC announced that it would nominate Nxesi to chair Parliament's Portfolio Committee on International Relations and Cooperation.

Nxesi joined the executive in a cabinet reshuffle announced by President Jacob Zuma on 31 October 2010. He was appointed as Deputy Minister of Rural Development and Land Reform, serving under Minister Gugile Nkwinti. Sadtu welcomed Zuma's announcement.

=== Minister of Public Works: 2011–2017 ===
In another cabinet reshuffle, announced on 24 October 2011, Zuma promoted Nxesi to the position of Minister of Public Works. He succeeded Gwen Mahlangu-Nkabinde, who was fired amid an investigation into a lease scandal that also implicated police commissioner Bheki Cele. Mahlangu-Nkabinde's former Deputy Minister, Hendrietta Bogopane-Zulu, was moved to a different ministry at the same time, leaving Nxesi without a deputy.

One of Nxesi's first acts as Minister was to accept, on behalf of the cabinet, a memorandum of protest from the ANC Youth League, which had marched to the Union Buildings to demand land expropriation without compensation. Nxesi said that he would review the ministry's workings and embark on "a listening campaign" before deciding on a strategy to turn around his new department. A fortnight later, he responded to the lease scandal by changing the department's process for approving new leases.

==== Tripartite Alliance elections ====
In the run-up to the 13th National Congress of the South African Communist Party (SACP), held at the University of Zululand in July 2012, Nxesi emerged as a likely candidate to succeed Joyce Moloi-Moropa as Deputy National Chairperson of the SACP. He had recently been co-opted onto the party's Central Committee. When the elections were held, he was elected unopposed, deputising Senzeni Zokwana. Months later, at the ANC's 53rd National Conference in December 2012, Nxesi was elected to a five-year term as a member of the ANC National Executive Committee. By number of votes received, he was ranked 60th of the 80 ordinary members elected to the committee.

=== Minister of Sport and Recreation: 2017–2018 ===
Shortly after midnight on 30 March 2017, Zuma announced a cabinet reshuffle in which Nxesi was moved to a new office as Minister of Sport and Recreation. Nxesi succeeded Fikile Mbalula in that office, and he said that his top priorities would include the transformation of sport and the promotion of school sports and youth development.

==== Tripartite Alliance elections ====
Despite Nxesi's perceived support for Zuma during the Nkandla saga, the Mail & Guardian observed by February 2016 that Nxesi and the SACP had "drifted apart" from Zuma. Indeed, during ANC National Executive Committee meetings over the next year, Nxesi reportedly voiced support for both of two unsuccessful motions of no confidence in Zuma's ANC presidency, one tabled by Derek Hanekom in November 2016 and another tabled by Joel Netshitenzhe in May 2017.

At the same time, SACP National Chairperson Senzeni Zokwana's failure to support the ANC motions of no confidence apparently drew the ire of a group of Zuma opponents in the SACP, who reportedly conspired to remove Zokwana from his post and remove him with Nxesi. However, when the SACP's 14th National Congress was held in July 2017, both Zokwana and Nxesi were re-elected unopposed to their positions. That December, at the ANC's 54th National Conference, Nxesi failed to gain re-election to the ANC National Executive Committee.

==== 2018 Davis Cup boycott ====
While Sports Minister, Nxesi personally boycotted a tennis match between Israel and South Africa, held in Pretoria during the 2018 Davis Cup. He was a supporter of the Boycott, Divestment and Sanctions movement. In an open letter, Nxesi wrote:

[G]iven the concerns that activists and fellow South Africans are raising regarding the presence of an Israeli team, I believe that it would not be proper for me to attend. International solidarity and the boycott against Apartheid South Africa played a big role in our liberation. Indeed, one of the most well-known slogans came out of that context – 'no normal sport with an abnormal regime!'

His letter accused Israel of "practicing apartheid" in occupied Palestine, and it also said that Nxesi had himself "experienced Israeli discrimination and occupation" when Israel denied him entry to Palestine years earlier. In the earlier incident, Nxesi had led the South African delegation to a 2012 meeting of the Non-Aligned Movement's Committee on Palestine; the meeting was scheduled to take place in Ramallah but had been blocked by Israeli authorities.

== Ramaphosa presidency ==
=== Minister of Public Works: 2018–2019 ===
In February 2018, newly elected ANC president Cyril Ramaphosa was elected to succeed Zuma as President of South Africa. When Ramaphosa announced his new cabinet, Nxesi was returned to his former office as Minister of Public Works, replacing Nathi Nhleko, who was fired. Several months into his tenure, he asked Ramaphosa to authorise further corruption probes in his department, to be carried out by the Special Investigating Unit; briefing the media on the scale of the problem in the portfolio, Nxesi called for "a massive struggle against the state capture forces which are still entrenched and desperately striving to keep open access to state coffers".

=== Minister of Employment and Labour: 2019–present ===
Pursuant to the 2019 general election, Nxesi was re-elected to his seat in the National Assembly, and Ramaphosa appointed him as Minister of Employment and Labour. Boitumelo Moloi was appointed his deputy.

In addition to his permanent ministry, Nxesi served as Acting Minister of Public Service and Administration from April 2022, after the incumbent, Ayanda Dlodlo, left to join the board of the World Bank. He acted in Dlodlo's ministry for almost a full year. During that time, he oversaw the adoption of a new policy framework for the professionalisation of the public service; he also presided over a prolonged wage dispute with the National Education, Health and Allied Workers' Union, which led to strike action and which the Mail & Guardian said "imperill[ed] whatever goodwill he has achieved with trade unions". Ramaphosa replaced him with a permanent appointment, Noxolo Kiviet, in March 2023.

Despite earlier rumours that Nxesi could face a challenge to his SACP leadership, he was re-elected as Deputy National Chairperson in July 2022, now deputising Blade Nzimande. At the ANC's 55th National Conference in December 2022, he again failed to gain election to the ANC National Executive Committee.

Nxesi had been ranked 109th on the ANC's national-to-national list for the 2024 general election. Due to the ANC's drop in electoral support, Nxesi was not re-elected to Parliament.

== Personal life ==
Nxesi is married to Sesi Nxesi, a former chief executive officer of the Education Seta. Their 17-year-old daughter, Lona, died in June 2012 in a car accident near Kroonstad; she was travelling home to Midrand from her boarding school in Bloemfontein.
