= Ndwedwe Local Municipality =

Coordinates: 29°30′S 30°56′E

Ndwedwe
- Local municipality
- Seal

- Location in KwaZulu-Natal
- Country: South Africa
- Province: KwaZulu-Natal
- District: iLembe
- Seat: Ndwedwe
- Wards: 19

Government
  - Type: Municipal council
  - Mayor: Welile Kubheka

Area
  - Total: 1,093 km^{2} (422 sq mi)

Population (2011)
  - Total: 140,820
  - Density: 128.8/km^{2} (333.7/sq mi)

Racial makeup (2011)
  - Black African: 98.4%
  - Coloured: 0.2%
  - Indian/Asian: 0.7%
  - White: 0.3%

First languages (2011)
  - Zulu: 92.0%
  - English: 2.0%
  - Xhosa: 1.9%
  - Southern Ndebele: 1.5%
  - Other: 2.6%
- Time zone: UTC+2 (SAST)
- Municipal code: KZN293

Ndwedwe Local Municipality is an administrative area in the iLembe District of KwaZulu-Natal in South Africa.

Primary kaolin deposits occur in Ndwedwe. Good quality material is found near Coqweni, Nozandla and Appelsbosch.

Towns in the municipality include Ndwedwe, Glendale Heights.

== Main places ==
The 2001 census divided the municipality into the following main places:

Place	Code	Area (km^{2})	Population
Amalanga	54501	58.57	6,076
Chili	54502	12.13	2,124
Cibane	54503	4.49	492
Gcwensa	54504	54.99	10,982
Hlophe	54505	7.94	1,462
Inkumba/KwaNyuswa	54506	158.70	25,234
Iqadi	54507	48.85	7,973
Khumalo	54508	12.40	1,660
Luthuli	54509	24.97	4,415
Mangangeni/Vumazonke	54510	13.73	2,068
Mathonsi	54511	40.53	547
Mlamuli Nyuswa	54512	127.66	21,740
Ndwedwe	54513	193.48	9,964
Ngcolosi	54514	17.15	2,459
Ngongoma/Mavela	54515	43.68	11,643
Nhlangwini	54516	60.39	7,785
Nodunga	54517	45.27	3,015
Nyuswa/Nodwengu	54518	74.47	11,577
Qadi	54519	18.75	3,161
Qwabe (Madundube)	54520	23.06	2,677
Qwabe N	54521	8.90	3,545
Shangase	54522	54.62	7,795
Wosiyane	54523	51.62	4,114

== Politics ==
The municipal council consists of thirty-seven members elected by mixed-member proportional representation. Nineteen councillors are elected by first-past-the-post voting in nineteen wards, while the remaining eighteen are chosen from party lists so that the total number of party representatives is proportional to the number of votes received.

In the election of 4 November 2026, the uMkhonto weSizwe Party (MKP) won a plurality of fifteen seats.

The following table shows the results of the election.

Party	Ward			List			Total seats
Party	Votes	%	Seats	Votes	%	Seats	Total seats
uMkhonto weSizwe Party	17,891	38.78	12	18,356	39.71	3	15
African National Congress	13,599	29.47	6	13,646	29.52	5	11
Inkatha Freedom Party	8,112	17.58	0	8,183	17.70	7	7
Economic Freedom Fighters	3,045	6.60	1	2,907	6.29	1	2
Democratic Alliance	684	1.48	0	723	1.56	1	1
Independent Alliance	661	1.43	0	651	1.41	1	1
Independent candidates	282	0.61	0				0
9 other parties	1,865	4.04	0	1,754	3.79	0	0
Total	46,139	100.00	19	46,220	100.00	18	37
Valid votes	46,139	98.11		46,220	98.35		
Invalid/blank votes	889	1.89		775	1.65		
Total votes	47,028	100.00		46,995	100.00		
Registered voters/turnout	81,946	57.39		81,946	57.35		
