= Department of Public Works and Infrastructure =

South African national government department

Department of Public Works
- List: 10 other official names: Departement van Openbare Werke (Afrikaans); umNyango wezemiSebenzi yomBuso (Southern Ndebele); iSebe lezeMisebenzi kaRhulumente (Xhosa); uMnyango Wezemisebenzi Yomphakathi (Zulu); Litiko Letemisebenti Yesive (Swazi); Kgoro ya Mešomo ya Mmušo (Northern Sotho); Lefapha la Mesebetsi ya Setjhaba (Sotho); Lefapha la Ditiro tsa Setšhaba (Tswana); Ndzawulo ya Mintirho ya Mfumo (Tsonga); Muhasho wa Mishumo ya Tshitshavha (Venda)

Department overview
- Formed: 1910; 116 years ago
- Jurisdiction: Government of South Africa
- Annual budget: R8.15 billion (2022/23)
- Ministers responsible: Dean Macpherson, Minister of Public Works and Infrastructure; Sihle Zikalala, Deputy Minister of Public Works
- Department executive: Alec Moemi, Director General
- Website: publicworks.gov.za

The Department of Public Works and Infrastructure (DPWI; formerly the Department of Public Works) is one of the ministries of the South African government. It is responsible for public infrastructure as well as providing accommodation and property management services to all the other ministries of the South African government. It is also responsible for promoting the national Expanded Public Works Programme and for encouraging the transformation of the construction and property industries in South Africa.

== Governance ==
In 2014 a spokesperson for the official opposition, David Maynier of the DA, described the department as "monumentally incompetent", and asked that it be kicked out of the SANDF. Secretary of Defence Sam Gulube said that the SANDF experienced a repair and maintenance backlog of some R8 to R13 billion, and that maintenance underspending by the department amounted to R1.6 billion over the years 2012 to 2014.

In March 2022 nine state department buildings in Pretoria were closed and their essential services interrupted when the department fell in arrears with its rent payments and allegedly owed R124 million. The department blamed the landlord, Bothongo Group, of rent that was not market related, while the group countered that the department was "a nest of corruption", which has no complaints when bribes are paid. Questions were also raised about non-contractual rent payments by the department to Armscor.

In 2024, following the ministerial appointment of Dean Macpherson, an ongoing R300 million cyber crime was uncovered. The latest heist was in May 2024 where R24 million was stolen. It was revealed that over a 10-year period, cyber criminals have been looting the department; possibly with help from department officials.

In 2026 the department uncovered 60 ghost workers who were defrauding it of some R15 million per annum. Most of the ghost workers exploited its Durban regional office.

== Branches ==
- Policy
- Expanded Public Works Programme
- Asset Management
- Finance and Procurement
- Operations
- Human Resource Management
- Information Technology

== Programmes ==
- National Infrastructure Maintenance Strategy
- National Construction Week
- Contractor Incubator Programme

== See also ==
- Construction industry in South Africa
