= Patekile Holomisa =

South African politician

Inkosi Sango Patekile Holomisa MP

Deputy Minister of Correctional Services
- In office 29 May 2019 – 17 June 2024
- President: Cyril Ramaphosa
- Constituency: Mqanduli (2014–2019)

Deputy Minister of Labour
- In office 26 May 2014 – 7 May 2019
- President: Jacob Zuma

Personal details
- Born: 26 August 1959 (age 66) Transkei

Inkosi Sango Patekile Holomisa (born 26 August 1959) is an ANC politician and the Deputy Minister of Correctional Services in South Africa, having been the Deputy Minister of Labour before.

== See also ==
- Constitution of South Africa
- History of the African National Congress
- Politics in South Africa
