= Pule Mabe =

South African politician (born 1980)

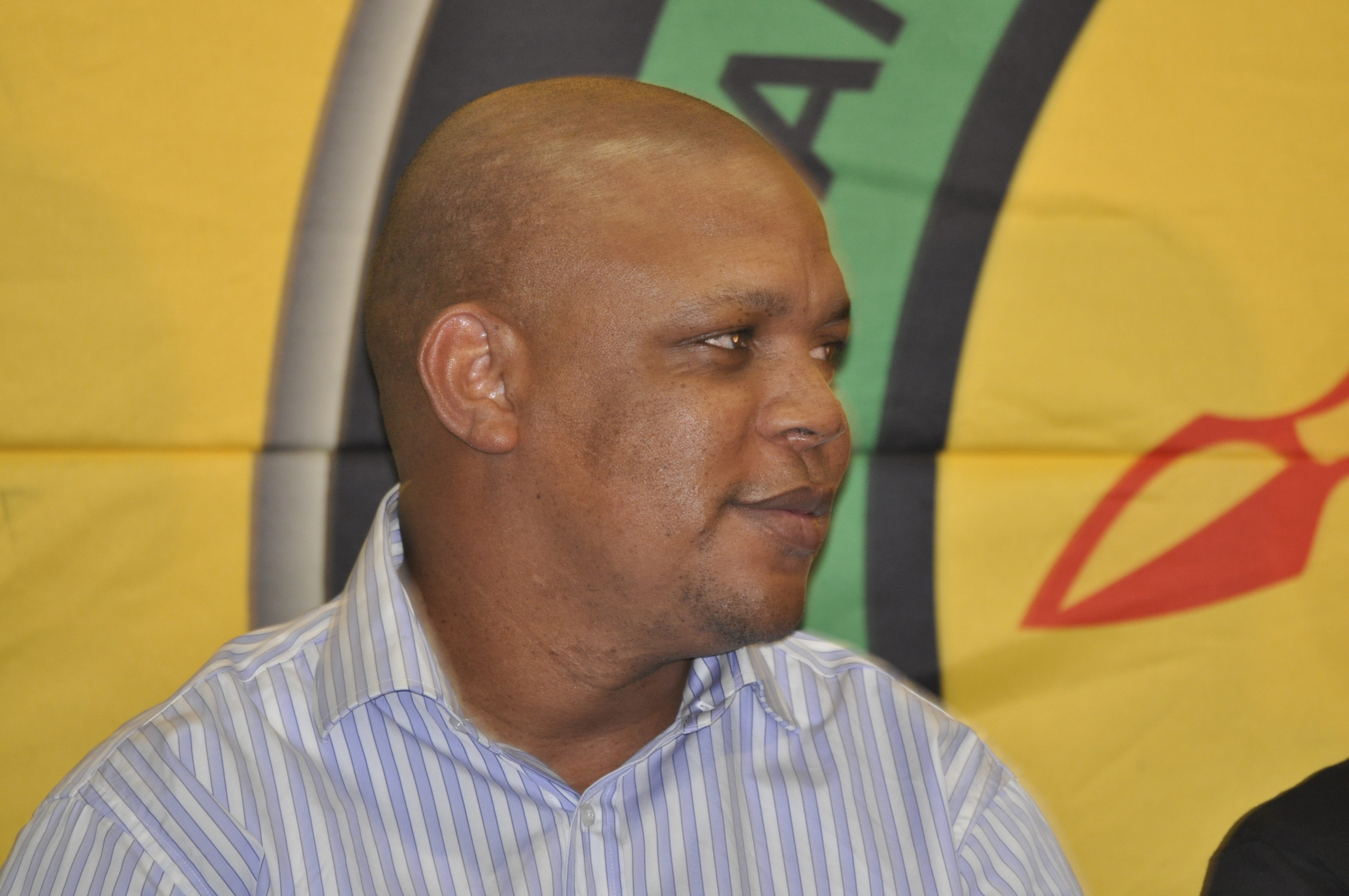

National Spokesperson of the African National Congress
- In office 6 February 2018 – 28 January 2023
- President: Cyril Ramaphosa
- Preceded by: Zizi Kodwa
- Succeeded by: Mahlengi Bhengu

Member of the National Assembly of South Africa
- In office 21 May 2014 – 31 August 2017

Personal details
- Born: Puleng Peter Mabe; 19 March 1980 (age 46) Phalaborwa, Transvaal; South Africa
- Party: African National Congress
- Education: Tshwane University of Technology; University of South Africa
- Occupation: Politician; businessman; youth activist
- Profession: Journalist

Puleng Peter "Pule" Mabe (born 19 March 1980) is a South African politician who served as the national spokesperson of the African National Congress (ANC), South Africa's governing party, from 2018 to 2023. He formerly represented the ANC in the National Assembly from 2014 to 2017.

Mabe rose to national prominence in 2008 when he was elected Treasurer-General of the ANC Youth League, then under the leadership of Julius Malema. Amid divisions over Malema's suspension from the ANC and over Mabe's political support for Jacob Zuma, Mabe was removed from his party position by a motion of no confidence in May 2012 and then reinstated in January 2013. After his term in the league office ended in March 2013, he launched an abortive campaign to succeed Malema as ANC Youth League president. He was elected to Parliament in the 2014 general election but resigned in mid-2017.

Mabe was elected to his first term on the ANC National Executive Committee in 2012. After his re-election at the party's 54th National Conference in December 2017, he was appointed ANC spokesperson in February 2018. He was elected to a third consecutive five-year term on the National Executive Committee in 2022.

A journalist by training, Mabe also had a career in business, and his former business dealings have attracted controversy. A 2012 contract between his company and the state-owned Passenger Rail Agency of South Africa was the subject of a Public Protector investigation and a parliamentary misconduct finding, and in 2014 Mabe was acquitted on a charge of defrauding the South African Social Security Agency.

== Early life and career ==
Mabe was born on 1 March 1980 in Namakgale, a township in Phalaborwa in present-day Limpopo. He was raised by a single mother who died when he was 22. He earned a BTech in journalism from the Tshwane University of Technology (then called Technikon Northern Gauteng), where he served as deputy president of the students' representative council from 1998 to 1999. Later, in June 2019, he completed a Master of Business Leadership at the University of South Africa.

After he earned his undergraduate degree, Mabe worked as a print journalist. He met and befriended Julius Malema in Johannesburg while he was working at his first reporting job at the Mail & Guardian. In the early 2000s, he left journalism and ultimately was employed at the Passenger Rail Agency of South Africa (Prasa), where he served as executive manager for corporate affairs until his resignation in the 2008/2009 financial year. He also pursued his own business career, establishing a publishing company called KG Media. Malema told the Mail & Guardian that he and Mabe occasionally took on business deals together, especially contracts with state agencies. In addition, Mabe served on the Gauteng Youth Commission from 2003 to 2009.

== ANCYL Treasurer: 2008–2013 ==
In April 2008, Mabe was elected Treasurer-General of the African National Congress (ANC) Youth League (ANCYL). He ran for the position on a slate of candidates aligned to Malema, who was elected ANCYL President at the same party conference. He was re-elected to the position, again alongside Malema, in June 2011. During his tenure as Treasurer-General, the league approached insolvency.

It was also reported that Mabe, formerly a "staunch supporter" of Malema, grew increasingly estranged from Malema in 2011 and 2012, as Malema turned against incumbent ANC President Jacob Zuma and was suspended and then expelled from the ANC. Mabe, and other ANCYL leaders aligned to him, apparently urged the ANCYL to accept Malema's expulsion and hold new leadership elections rather than challenge the mainstream ANC's decision. In addition, the pro-Malema caucus of the ANCYL reportedly resented Mabe's support for Zuma's bid to be re-elected ANC President, as it was at odds with the ANCYL's unofficial platform at the time.

=== Motion of no confidence ===
In May 2012, the ANCYL National Executive Committee passed a motion of no confidence in Mabe and dismissed him as Treasurer-General, though he would remain an ordinary member of the league. The motion reportedly arose from allegations that Mabe had mismanaged the league's funds and, through his own ANCYL presidential ambitions, had sown division in the league. Pule rejected the decision, saying it had been made improperly. The Mail & Guardian reported that Mabe attempted to attend an ANCYL leadership meeting as usual later in May and was escorted out by security guards.

According to the Sowetan, some ANCYL members believed that Mabe's dismissal constituted an attempt to sideline him in the race to succeed Malema; the Sunday Independent said that it was the third attempt to remove Mabe from the ANCYL leadership. Sources told the Sowetan that several members of the ANCYL National Executive Committee intended to ask the mainstream ANC to review the decision, and Mabe laid a formal complaint with the ANC leadership, who concurred that the decision was indeed procedurally questionable and did require review.

=== Election to the NEC ===
Amid his battle with the ANCYL, Mabe attended the ANC's 53rd National Conference in December 2012 and secured election to his first five-year term on the mainstream party's National Executive Committee; by number of votes received, he was ranked 64th of the 80 candidates elected to the committee. Mabe was the youngest member of the committee at that time and his election was linked to his support for Zuma's re-election bid at the same conference. He was appointed to the National Executive Committee's subcommittee on communications.

In the aftermath of the national conference, in late January 2013, the ANCYL reinstated Mabe as Treasurer-General, acknowledging in a statement that "no proper process was followed in the removal of comrade Pule". In the same statement, the league acknowledged and accepted the mainstream ANC's decision not to reinstate Malema. However, less than two months after Mabe's reinstatement, the ANC National Executive Committee prematurely ended his term and that of the league's other leaders when it resolved to disband the incumbent ANCYL leadership corps.

== National Assembly: 2014–2017 ==
In the 2014 general election, Mabe was elected to a seat in the National Assembly, the lower house of the South African Parliament; he was ranked 53rd on the ANC's party list. News24 said that in Parliament Mabe "consistently and fiercely defended" President Zuma.

=== Fraud trial ===
While a Member of Parliament, Mabe was a defendant in a criminal trial which dated back to November 2013, when he turned himself in for arrest at the Sunnyside police station in Pretoria. He and his co-accused, Paseka Letsatsi and Kabedi Ramosa, were charged with fraud, money laundering, and theft. Prosecutors alleged that Letsatsi, an employee of the South African Social Security Agency (SASSA), had illegally solicited funds from SASSA and given them to companies owned by Mabe and Ramosa. City Press alleged that a Mabe-owned company had received R1.5 million, of which R681,000 allegedly went to Mabe's personal bank accounts; the newspaper also claimed that Mabe had paid some of the money out to other political comrades, including R30,000 to Floyd Shivambu. Shivambu has since joined Jacob Zuma newly called MK Party on 15 August 2024.

Mabe was released on R10,000 bail and made his first appearance in the Pretoria Specialised Commercial Crime Court in February 2014. In September that year, law enforcement agencies, acting in terms of the Prevention of Organised Crime Act, seized assets worth R2.2 million from Mabe, Letsatsi, and Ramosa. Mabe and his co-accused were acquitted in December 2014. Mabe said that he had been "tried in court and the court of public opinion" and that his reputation had been severely damaged.

=== ANCYL presidency bid ===
Also while Mabe was in Parliament, the ANCYL prepared to elect a new leadership corps to replace that which had been disbanded in March 2013. Mabe had been viewed as a possible successor to Malema since at least 2012, and, despite the pending criminal charges against him, he emerged as one of the frontrunners for election as ANCYL President, alongside Ronald Lamola and Magasela Mzobe. Stella Ndabeni-Abrahams later said that Mabe's candidacy had high-level political support, including from Zuma himself. However, the Mail & Guardian reported that the ANC's top leadership urged him – without success – to withdraw from the contest because of the pending fraud charges against him.

The league's elective conference was scheduled for December 2014, but, when it opened, the national ANC unexpectedly announced that the conference would instead be a "consultative" conference and that no leadership vote would take place. This was viewed as an attempt by national ANC leaders, including ANC Secretary-General Gwede Mantashe, to block Mabe's candidature.

In 2015, Mabe was still considered a presidential candidate, although the City Press reported that he had lost the backing of the influential "Premier League" – David Mabuza, Supra Mahumapelo, and Ace Magashule, the Premiers of Mpumalanga, North West, and Free State respectively, who apparently had switched their support to Collen Maine. There was also substantial controversy about Mabe's age: in March 2015, he turned 35, the cut-off age for membership in the ANCYL, but it was not clear whether he would remain eligible until his 36th birthday. When the elective conference opened in September 2015, Mabe did not qualify for inclusion on the ballot; Maine was elected unopposed and Mabe was succeeded as Treasurer-General by Reggie Nkabinde.

=== Public Protector investigation ===
In 2015, Mabe was implicated in an investigation into corruption at Prasa conducted by the Public Protector, Thuli Madonsela. The report of the investigation concluded that Mabe had benefitted from a R33-million state communications contract between Prasa and his company, KG Media, which had been improperly awarded in 2012 and improperly extended in 2015.

Parliament's Joint Committee on Ethics and Members' Interests subsequently launched its own investigation in response to a complaint alleging that Mabe, in the Prasa saga, had breached the parliamentary code of conduct. The initial improper award of the Prasa contract had taken place before Mabe was sworn into the National Assembly, but he was in his seat in 2015 when the contract was unlawfully extended. According to the committee, at that time, Mabe had resigned his directorship at KG Media but remained a beneficiary of the Kedibone Mabe Trust, which held 100% of shares in KG Media; the committee therefore found that Mabe had contravened the ethics code's prohibition against Members of Parliament "receiving any benefit including but not limited to a tender or a contract with an organ of state". Mabe was sentenced to a reprimand and to pay a fine worth 15 days of his salary, about R40,000.

Also noted in the Public Protector's 2015 report was the allegation that Prasa had improperly paid salaries to Mabe in 2009 after he had already left his job at Prasa to take up his ANCYL office. Investigation of this claim was deferred to the second volume of the report, released in April 2019, in which Madonsela's successor in the Public Protector's office, Busisiwe Mkhwebane, said that the allegation could not be substantiated.

=== Resignation ===
In mid-2017, the ANC appointed Mabe as the party caucus's whip in Parliament's Standing Committee on Finance. However, in early September 2017, he announced his resignation from the National Assembly. News24 speculated that he might have been "bitter" that President Zuma had not appointed him as a Deputy Minister or Minister in his cabinet, although Mabe rejected that interpretation. After he resigned, he returned full-time to his business career.

== ANC spokesman: 2018–2022 ==
Ahead of the ANC's 54th National Conference in December 2017, Mabe supported Nkosazana Dlamini-Zuma's unsuccessful campaign to be elected ANC President upon the expiry of Zuma's term. He was nonetheless re-elected to the party's National Executive Committee, ranked 25th of the 80 elected candidates by popularity. In the aftermath of the conference, on 6 February 2018, the ANC announced that Mabe had been appointed as the party's national spokesperson, effective immediately. He succeeded Zizi Kodwa in that role. He assumed office shortly before the party forced Zuma to resign as national President.

=== Sexual harassment allegation ===
In December 2018, Mabe took a leave of absence from his ANC work in order to address an allegation of sexual harassment after his personal assistant laid an internal complaint against him. She alleged that Mabe had made unwanted sexual advances on three separate occasions and that, when she rejected his advances, he had emotionally abused her and reduced her salary. Mabe strongly denied the accusation and said that he had lowered her salary because he had discovered that she had fraudulently misrepresented her qualifications in her job application.

While on leave, Mabe was replaced in an acting capacity by his predecessor, Zizi Kodwa, and then by Dakota Legoete. In February 2019, an internal ANC panel chaired by Sdumo Dlamini cleared Mabe of sexual harassment and ruled that both he and the complainant should return to work. However, dissatisfied with the ANC finding, the complainant lodged a formal complaint against Mabe with the police, and he voluntarily extended his leave in line with the ANC's step-aside policy. He also laid his own complaint with the police, alleging that the misrepresentations on his accuser's job application amounted to criminal fraud and had caused him personal harm. He returned to work at Luthuli House in early April 2019.

=== SIU investigations ===
While ANC spokesman, Mabe remained involved in business, developing and patenting a model of three-wheel motorbike, labelled the Kariki, that was specially modified to transport solid waste in under-serviced remote or highly populated areas such as informal settlements. The Karikis were made and sold by Mabe's company Enviro Mobi. Mabe later said that he had resigned from Enviro Mobi in 2014, though he retained the patent for the Karikis.

In 2017 and 2018, Enviro Mobi reportedly received R27-million in state contracts, with the Gauteng provincial government and City of Ekurhuleni Metropolitan Municipality, to supply Karikis to waste collectors. The Mail & Guardian reported in 2018 that the initial contract had been awarded improperly and had not been fulfilled timeously. The Special Investigating Unit (SIU) reportedly raised similar concerns in a 2019 investigation into the contracts, although the SIU report was not released to the public. In April 2021, President Cyril Ramaphosa granted the SIU a mandate to investigate the Enviro Mobi contracts more thoroughly.

=== ANC treasury bid ===
Ahead of the ANC's 55th National Conference in December 2022, Mabe was nominated to stand for the position of ANC Treasurer-General. Other contenders for the office included Bejani Chauke, Mzwandile Masina, and Gwen Ramokgopa. When the conference opened, Masina withdrew from the race and endorsed Mabe, saying that he and Mabe had shared objectives – including shared support for the ANC presidential bid of Zweli Mkhize – and therefore wished to avoid splitting the vote. However, at the time of Masina's withdrawal, his name had already been printed on the ballot and voting had begun; despite the announcement of his withdrawal, Masina ultimately received 281 votes. Mabe lost to Ramokgopa by a margin of 157 votes, receiving 1,652 votes against her 1,809.

However, the conference re-elected Mabe to his third consecutive five-year term on the National Executive Committee; by popularity, he was ranked eighth of the 80 candidates elected, receiving 1,806 votes across the 4,029 ballots cast in total. He said that he would not seek reappointment as spokesperson.

== Personal life ==
Mabe met his wife, Hleki, while he was an undergraduate. As of 2018, they had two children: a son, Kgothatso (born 2003), and a daughter, Naledi (born 2010).
