= Department of Electricity and Energy =

South African government department

- List: 10 other official names: Departement van Energie (Afrikaans); umNyango wezaMandla (Southern Ndebele); iSebe lezaMandla (Xhosa); uMnyango wezaMandla (Zulu); Litiko leTemandla (Swazi); Kgoro ya Enetši (Northern Sotho); Lefapha la Eneji (Sotho); Lefapha la Maatla (Tswana); Ndzawulo ya Eneji (Tsonga); Muhasho wa Fulufulu (Venda)

Department overview
- Formed: 7 July 2009; 17 years ago
- Preceding department: Department of Minerals and Energy
- Type: Department
- Jurisdiction: Government of South Africa
- Headquarters: 192 Visagie Street, Pretoria; 25.752°S 28.188°E
- Employees: 622 (2016/17)
- Annual budget: R7,45 million (2016/17)
- Minister responsible: Kgosientso Ramokgopa, Minister of Electricity and Energy
- Deputy Minister responsible: Ms. Samantha Graham, Deputy Minister of Energy
- Department executive: Mr. Thabane Zulu, Director-General: Energy
- Child agencies: National Energy Regulator of South Africa; National Nuclear Regulator; Central Energy Fund; South African Nuclear Energy Corporation; Electricity Distribution Industry Holdings; South African National Energy Development Institute
- Key document: National Energy Act, 2008
- Website: www.energy.gov.za

The Department of Electricity and Energy is the department of the South African government responsible for energy policy. The department manages energy resources in South Africa and is responsible for ensuring the exploration, development, processing, utilisation of those resources.

== History ==
It was established in May 2009 when the former Department of Minerals and Energy was divided into the Department of Energy and the Department of Mineral Resources. The Department of Energy would create two main branches. An Electricity and Nuclear Branch to manage the country's electricity industry and nuclear energy. A Hydrocarbons and Energy Planning Branch managed coal, gas, liquid fuels, energy efficiency, renewable energy sectors while also managing the country's energy planning and an energy database.

The minister of energy gained a deputy minister from 31 October 2010.

From 2012 to 2014, the Minister of Energy was Ben Martins and his deputy was Barbara Thompson. Tina Joemat-Pettersson MP had been the Minister of Energy. She was previously the Minister of Agriculture, Forestry, and Fisheries from 2009 to 2014. After Tine Joemat-Petterson was asked to leave, Mmamoloko Kubayi-Ngubane was appointed. This only lasted 7 months before the next reshuffle and the appointment of David Mahlobo. His appointment was potentially linked to securing the planned Russian nuclear deal - a country he had just visited as Minister of State Security.

In the 2016/2017 budget the department had a budget of R7,545 million and a staff complement of 622 civil servants.

President Cyril Ramaphosa appointed Jeff Radebe as Minister as part of his cabinet reshuffle on 26 January 2018.

In August 2018, the Department of Energy released a draft of South Africa's updated Integrated Resource Plan (IRP), the plan which seeks to meet the country's energy consumption demands, for public comment. The current plan dropped proposals for expansion of the number of nuclear plants in the country, focusing instead on expanding the production of renewable energy and creating two new coal power plants.

Appointing his second cabinet on 29 May 2019, President Cyril Ramaphosa announced that the energy portfolio would be merged with the minerals portfolio, as it had been before Zuma's tenure. Soon after the ministries were merged into the Ministry of Mineral Resources and Energy, the respective departments were likewise merged into the Department of Mineral Resources and Energy.

During his State of the Nation Address on 9 February 2023, Ramaphosa announced his intention to appoint a minister of electricity, based in the presidency, to oversee all aspects of the country's response to the ongoing electricity crisis, including leading the National Energy Crisis Committee. The first minister in the presidency for electricity, Kgosientso Ramokgopa, was appointed in a cabinet reshuffle on 6 March 2023.

Among other things, the minister of electricity had responsibility for procurement of new electricity generation capacity. However, he served alongside the incumbent mineral resources and energy minister, Gwede Mantashe, and there was uncertainty about the delineation of functions between them – especially given that a third minister, the minister of public enterprises, oversaw Eskom.

On 30 June 2024, appointing his third cabinet, Ramaphosa announced that the relevant ministries would be reconfigured: energy would be detached from the mineral resources portfolio and become the sole prerogative of a new minister of electricity and energy.
