= South African National Energy Development Institute =

South African institute for energy research

Agency overview
- Formed: 2011; 15 years ago
- Type: Clean energy research and development institute
- Jurisdiction: Government of South Africa
- Headquarters: Sandton, Gauteng, South Africa
- Employees: 111 (2025)
- Annual budget: ▲ R144 million (2025)
- Agency executives: Sicelo Xulu, Chairperson; Prathaban Moodley, Acting CEO
- Parent agency: Department of Electricity and Energy (DEE)
- Key document: National Energy Act, No. 34 of 2008
- Website: sanedi.org.za

The South African National Energy Development Institute (SANEDI) is a South African government agency focused on clean energy research and development, that forms part of the Department of Electricity and Energy (DEE).

Its legislative mandate is to direct, monitor, conduct, and implement energy research and technology development in all fields of energy aside from nuclear, and to promote energy research and technology innovation in South Africa.

Some of SANEDI's focus areas include; a just energy transition in South Africa, climate change mitigation, energy security, and support for municipal service delivery. The organization provides technical support to its parent department at global forums including the African Union, BRICS+, the G20, the G7, and the United Nations Climate Change Conference.

== History ==
The South African National Energy Development Institute was established in 2011, through the promulgation of the National Energy Act, No. 34 of 2008.

In 2009, SANEDI shifted from being part of the Department of Mineral Resources and Energy (DMRE), to fall under the newly-created Department of Energy.

In 2024, SANEDI became part of the newly-created Department of Electricity and Energy (DEE).

In 2025, SANEDI produced a total of 28 energy solutions and research reports across a variety of focus areas, including "renewables, data and knowledge management, standards and labelling, smart grids, cleaner mobility, cleaner fuels, and the energy efficiency sub-programs".

In February 2026, SANEDI hosted its third annual conference. At the event, Minister of Electricity and Energy Kgosientsho Ramokgopa stated that South Africa's pursuit of energy security and achieving the correct energy mix needs to be based on science-backed policy, and [that] government should take a leading role in the process. Furthermore, he said that agencies like SANEDI would be play a significant role in helping resolve the questions surrounding the process, and guiding SA's energy policies.

In March 2026, SANEDI began developing a monitored microgrid pilot to assess how decentralized energy systems perform under South African conditions. The pilot includes industrial, mining, defense, and household applications. It involves, among other aspects, assessing demand-side efficiency measures, photovoltaic (PV) generation, battery energy storage systems, and the monitoring of environmental factors in terms of their impact on these systems. The pilot is a source of performance and cost data relevant to decisions made between grid extension and microgrid deployment, which SANEDI has already set out a framework for.

== Funding ==
SANEDI is funded through Parliamentary appropriations, via the Department of Electricity and Energy, as well as through third-party funding. The majority (around 80%) of SANEDI's funding is sourced from government grants and subsidies, with most of the rest of it coming from sponsorships and consultancy work.

== Structure ==
SANEDI is led by a Board, which contains a Chairperson, Deputy Chair, and CEO. SANEDI falls under the South African Department of Electricity and Energy, and its board is thus appointed by South Africa's Minister of Electricity and Energy.

== See also ==
- Electricity sector in South Africa
- Energy in South Africa
- Department of Electricity and Energy
