= Petroleum industry in South Africa =

Toyota Land Cruiser J70 on the M3 Freeway in Cape Town, in front of a Shell outlet

The petroleum industry in South Africa comprises the exploration, importation, refining, storage, distribution, and retailing of petroleum products in South Africa. The country has historically relied heavily on imported crude oil, while domestic production has been supplemented by synthetic fuel produced from coal and natural gas. The industry supplies gasoline, diesel, jet fuel, liquefied petroleum gas, fuel oil, bitumen, marine fuels, and other petroleum products to the domestic market.

As of September 2026, South Africa has two crude oil refineries in operation, the Astron Energy Refinery in the Western Cape and the Natref Refinery in the Free State. Together, they have a capacity of 208,000 barrels per day.

In 2022, the petroleum industry contributed 3% to South Africa's GDP.

The country has seven major petroleum retail chains, with a combined 4,000 locations as of 2025. The two largest companies by number of outlets – Engen Petroleum and Astron Energy, are headquartered in Cape Town, with the other five headquartered in the City of Johannesburg. They support a thriving automotive industry and robust logistics industry, including approximately 8 million passenger vehicles and around 3 million trucks and delivery vehicles.

The petroleum industry as a whole is regulated by the Department of Mineral Resources and Energy (DMRE), and the development of industry assets is managed by the Central Energy Fund.

The country has a network of around 2,500km of fuel pipelines, owned and operated by state-owned Transnet. Petroleum storage and loading facilities are regulated by the National Energy Regulator of South Africa (NERSA). South Africa has a total of 2.46 billion liters of licensed storage capacity for diesel, gasoline, and jet fuel. The country also has crude oil storage facilities managed by the Strategic Fuel Fund, with a capacity that is not publicly known.

== History ==
=== Early development ===
Petroleum products were imported into South Africa from the late 19th century, initially primarily as kerosene and other fuels. The country's dependence on imported petroleum increased as motorization and industrialization expanded during the first half of the 20th century. The national government subsequently promoted domestic fuel production to reduce dependence on imported petroleum and exposure to external supply disruptions.

=== Establishment of the refining industry ===
South Africa's modern refining industry began in 1954, when US company Mobil commissioned SA's first crude oil refinery in Durban. This was followed by the commissioning of the SAPREF Refinery in Durban in 1963, the Calref Refinery (now the Astron Energy Refinery) in Cape Town in 1966, and the Natref Refinery in Sasolburg, Free State in 1971. The development of oil refineries was accompanied by the construction of pipelines linking coastal supply points with inland markets.

=== Development of synthetic fuels ===
The South African Government established fuels company Sasol in 1950, to develop the production of synthetic fuels from domestic coal. Its first plant at Sasolburg, in the Free State began producing synthetic fuels in 1955. During the 1970s and early 1980s, Sasol expanded its coal-to-liquids industry with the construction of the Sasol Two and Sasol Three complexes in Secunda, in Mpumalanga, substantially increasing domestic synthetic fuel production.

=== Apartheid-era sanctions ===
International pressure against South Africa's apartheid government increasingly affected the petroleum industry during the 1970s. The United Nations imposed mandatory crude oil sanctions on South Africa in 1977, reinforcing the government's efforts to develop domestic sources of liquid fuels and strategic petroleum stocks. The Central Energy Fund was established that same year, incorporating the Strategic Fuel Fund, while Sasol expanded its synthetic fuel production at Secunda. The Mossgas gas-to-liquids plant at Mossel Bay began production in 1992, shortly before the United Nations oil sanctions were lifted in 1993.

=== Post-apartheid restructuring ===
The end of apartheid and the lifting of international sanctions in the early 1990s led to the reintegration of South Africa's petroleum industry into international markets, and a restructuring of the national government's role in the sector. The government began reforming the upstream regulatory system, while former state-owned oil and gas exploration company Soekor's regulatory functions were separated.

In 1999, the Petroleum Agency of South Africa (PASA) was established, and made responsible for the licensing and regulation of petroleum exploration and production.

In 2002, Soekor, Mossgas, and parts of the Strategic Fuel Fund were merged to form a new state-owned petroleum company, PetroSA. This brought the national government's commercial petroleum activities together into an integrated company covering the petroleum value chain.

=== Recent developments ===
From the late 2010s onward, South Africa's conventional refining capacity began to decrease, as ageing facilities faced operational, financial, and feedstock challenges. PetroSA's Mossel Bay gas-to-liquids plant was placed on maintenance in 2020 because of declining gas feedstock. The Engen refinery was shut down in December 2020. The SAPREF Refinery paused refining operations in 2022. These closures significantly reduced domestic refining capacity and increased the industry's dependence on imported refined petroleum products.

In 2025, the newly established South African National Petroleum Company (SANPC) announced plans to rebuild the former SAPREF Refinery in Durban, and to reinstate PetroSA's gas-to-liquids refinery in Mossel Bay. The SANPC stated that the former SAPREF site could eventually be rebuilt with a capacity of more than 600,000 barrels per day, while its turnaround plan identified the Mossel Bay GTL Refinery as a priority project for reinstatement.

In March 2026, the South African Government reported progress towards the restoration of the former SAPREF site, while PetroSA issued a tender for preparation and planning services for the reinstatement of the Mossel Bay GTL Refinery. In September that same year, the Central Energy Fund outlined a three-phase plan for the former SAPREF site, beginning with the use of its existing infrastructure for imported petroleum products. Thereafter, a goal of new refining capacity of about 400,000 barrels per day was set, with a potential longer term capacity of up to 650,000 barrels per day.

== Upstream industry ==
=== Crude oil production ===
South Africa has historically produced only small quantities of crude oil and remains heavily dependent on imports. Domestic crude oil production has been concentrated in the offshore fields of the Bredasdorp Basin, and has decreased substantially over the years. The country currently has no significant commercial crude oil production, although offshore exploration continues in the search for potentially commercial oil and gas resources.

=== Offshore exploration ===
South Africa's offshore exploration industry has expanded in recent years, particularly following major oil discoveries in Namibia's Orange Basin, which extends into South African waters. Exploration is focused on several deep water areas, including the Orange Basin off the west coast and the Outeniqua Basin off the southern coast.

Companies including Total, Shell, and their partners hold interests in several offshore blocks, and have proposed exploration drilling campaigns. Total has proposed drilling up to seven exploration and appraisal wells in its Deep Western Orange Basin block, while Shell has received authorization to drill exploration wells in the Northern Cape Ultra Deep block.

== Refining ==
=== Crude-oil refineries ===
South Africa currently has two operational crude oil refineries; the Astron Energy Refinery in Cape Town, with a capacity of 100,000 barrels per day, and the Natref Refinery in Sasolburg, Free State, with a capacity of 108,000 barrels per day. This makes for a combined capacity of 208,000 barrels per day. Both refineries rely on imported crude oil and produce petroleum products including petrol, diesel, jet fuel, and LPG.

=== Synthetic fuel production ===
South African petroleum company Sasol operates a large coal-to-liquids facility in Secunda, Free State, where coal is converted into synthetic fuels and other products. The Secunda complex has a synthetic fuel production capacity equivalent to approximately 150,000 barrels of oil per day, and produces products including petrol, diesel, jet fuel, LPG, and other liquid fuels.

=== Refinery closures and redevelopments ===
South Africa's crude oil refining capacity has decreased substantially since the early 2020s, following the closure of several refineries. The SAPREF Refinery in Durban ceased operations in 2022, while the Engen Refinery in Durban, and PetroSA's Mossel Bay gas-to-liquids refinery, also subsequently ceased production. The closures increased the country's reliance on imported refined petroleum products.

However, the Engen Refinery is being converted into a fuel storage and import terminal, and the other two closed refineries have plans to reopen.

The state-owned Central Energy Fund (CEF) acquired the former SAPREF Refinery site and assets in December 2024, and has set out a three-phase redevelopment plan to restart refining operations there. The second phase would rebuild refining capacity to about 400,000 barrels per day, potentially increasing to 650,000 barrels per day in the third phase. The project is still pending relevant investment and approvals.

The national government and CEF have stated they support plans to reopen the PetroSA/Mossel Bay GTL refinery, and the SANPC has said that doing so is a priority project. A 2026 PetroSA tender was issued for the GTL Refinery Reinstatement Project: Preparation and Planning Services.

== Petroleum products ==
The South African petroleum industry produces, imports, distributes, and markets a range of refined and synthetic petroleum products. These include petrol, diesel, jet fuel, liquefied petroleum gas (LPG), fuel oil, marine fuels, and bitumen. Domestic production is supplemented by imports to meet demand. In 2023, approximately 25% of petroleum products required in South Africa were produced domestically, while 64% were imported, and 11% were exported.

Gasoline is primarily used as a road transport fuel for passenger cars, motorcycles, and light commercial vehicles. South Africa produces gasoline from crude oil refining at the Astron Energy Refinery and Natref Refinery, as well as synthetic fuel components produced by Sasol at its Secunda facility. Imported gasoline is used to supplement domestic production.

Diesel is used extensively in road freight, mining, agriculture, construction, rail transport, and electricity generation. It is produced locally from crude oil at the Astron Energy and Natref refineries, and synthetically by Sasol, but is also the largest imported petroleum product. In the third quarter of 2025, diesel accounted for 65% of refined petroleum product imports, equivalent to approximately 3.3 billion liters.

Jet fuel is used primarily by the aviation industry. Jet A-1 is manufactured domestically at the Astron Energy and Natref refineries, while additional supplies are imported to meet demand at South African airports.

Liquefied petroleum gas (LPG), consisting primarily of propane and butane, is used for industrial applications as well as for cooking and heating in some households. It is produced as a refinery product and through Sasol's synthetic fuels operations, but South Africa also imports LPG to supplement domestic supply. LPG accounted for 8% of refined petroleum product imports in Q3 2025, at approximately 411 million liters.

Fuel oil and marine fuels comprise heavier petroleum products used for industrial heating, power generation, shipping, and other specialized applications. These products are manufactured domestically by Natref, Astron Energy, and Sasol. Marine fuels are also imported, depending on demand and availability.

Bitumen is a heavy petroleum product used primarily as a binder in asphalt and road construction. The vast majority of South African roadways are paved using asphalt. Bitumen is manufactured domestically, including by Sasol, which produces penetration-grade and cutback bitumen for the South African and broader Southern African markets.

== Imports and supply ==
While South Africa has domestic crude oil production and refining capacity, it is reliant on imports to meet its petroleum demand. The country currently has two operational crude oil refineries, Astron Energy Refinery in Cape Town and Natref in Sasolburg, Free State, in addition to Sasol's coal-to-liquids operations at Secunda, in Mpumalanga. These facilities rely on imported crude oil, while South Africa also imports substantial quantities of refined petroleum products to supplement domestic production.

Crude oil is imported from a range of international suppliers. During the third quarter of 2025, South Africa imported approximately 3.3 billion liters of crude oil. Major sources included Nigeria, Angola, the United States, Saudi Arabia, the United Arab Emirates, Brazil, and Turkey.

Major source countries for crude oil imports to South Africa in Q3 2025

South Africa is also a major importer of refined petroleum products. In the third quarter of 2025, the country imported approximately 3.3 billion litres of diesel, representing 65% of refined petroleum product imports, and 1.1 billion litres of petrol, representing 21%. LPG accounted for 411 million litres, or 8%, while Jet A-1 accounted for 177 million litres, or 3%. The reliance on imported refined products has increased as domestic refining capacity has declined, making the country increasingly dependent on international refining capacity and maritime supply chains.

Most petroleum imports enter South Africa through coastal ports and are transferred to storage facilities before being distributed to inland markets by pipeline, rail, and road. The Port of Durban and the Island View precinct form a particularly important part of this system. Island View is a major fuel import and storage facility and supplies the bulk of South Africa's fuel requirements. The precinct contains storage tanks and other liquid-bulk infrastructure operated by petroleum companies including Sasol, Engen, Total, and Astron Energy, with access to berths at the port for the import and export of crude oil, petroleum products, and other liquid bulk commodities.

Due to its dependence on imports, the South Africa's petroleum supply can be impacted by international crude oil and petroleum product prices, shipping costs, exchange rate movements, geopolitics, and changes to major maritime trade routes. South Africa's fuel pricing system incorporates the international prices of crude oil and finished petroleum products, as well as importation costs, such as shipping.

The government and petroleum companies monitor international developments and seek to diversify sources of crude oil and refined products to reduce the risk of supply disruptions. The increasing reliance on imported petroleum products has made ports, storage facilities, pipelines, and other import infrastructure strategically important to South Africa's energy security.

== Distribution and storage ==
Petroleum products are distributed through a network of storage terminals, pipelines, depots, road tankers, rail facilities, and retail service stations. Coastal ports are particularly important because South Africa imports a substantial proportion of its refined petroleum products, while inland markets are supplied through pipelines, and other forms of transport from coastal and inland storage facilities.

The Transnet Pipelines network is a major component of the country's petroleum distribution infrastructure. The network extends across KwaZulu-Natal, the Free State, Mpumalanga, Gauteng, and the North West. It includes the Jameson Park inland accumulation facility in Gauteng, which has a storage capacity of 180 million liters, and the Tarlton tank farm, which has a capacity of 29 million liters and supplies fuel by rail and road.

Transnet Pipelines transports petroleum products from coastal supply points to inland markets, and provides pipeline transportation for the crude oil requirements of the Natref Refinery in Sasolburg, in the Free State. The pipeline network also transports refined products from Natref and Secunda to markets further inland, while an integrated rail and pipeline system supplies OR Tambo International Airport with jet fuel.

The Island View precinct at the Port of Durban is a major hub for petroleum imports and storage. The precinct has operated as a liquid bulk and petroleum storage complex since 1960, and contains storage tanks, pipelines, and loading infrastructure connected to the port's berths. It supplies the majority of South Africa's fuel requirements and is therefore strategically important to national fuel security.

Petroleum storage and loading facilities are regulated by the National Energy Regulator of South Africa (NERSA) under the Petroleum Pipelines Act, 2003. NERSA licenses petroleum pipelines, storage facilities, and loading facilities, sets tariffs, and regulates third party access to infrastructure. Its licensing records include storage and loading facilities at major petroleum distribution centers including Durban, Saldanha Bay, Germiston, Secunda, and various airports.

== Retail market ==
As of 2025, there were a total of 4,000 gas stations across South Africa. Some companies that operated forecourts were also involved in local crude oil refining, and other related activities. Ranked in descending order by total number of outlets in 2025, they are:

Company	Domicile	HQ	Owner/s	Established	Started fuel retailing in SA	Total outlets (2025)	Convenience stores	Rewards partner	Ref.
Engen	South African	Cape Town, Western Cape	Vivo Energy (74%); Phembani (21%); employee share ownership programme (5%)	1881; 145 years ago	1960; 66 years ago	1,040	Woolworths Foodstop; Quickshop & Co (in-house)	eBucks; Clicks ClubCard	
Astron Energy	Foreign-owned	Cape Town, Western Cape	Glencore (68%); Off The Shelf Investments (23%); employees (9%)	1911; 115 years ago	2018; 8 years ago	850	FreshStop (by Food Lover's Market)	UCount Rewards	
Shell	Foreign-owned	Sandton, Gauteng	Shell plc (72%); Thebe Investment Corporation (28%); proposed sale to ADNOC Distribution announced in 2026	1902; 124 years ago	1902; 124 years ago	591	SPAR Express	V+ Rewards; Absa Rewards; Discovery Vitality Drive	
Total	Foreign-owned	Johannesburg, Gauteng	TotalEnergies (50.1%); TOSACO (49.9%)	1954; 72 years ago	1955; 71 years ago	547	Café Bonjour (in-house); La Boutique (in-house)	TotalEnergies Club; Dis-Chem; Sanlam Money Saver	
BP	Foreign-owned	Johannesburg, Gauteng	BP plc (75%); Kapela (20%); BPSA Education Foundation Trust (5%)	1924; 102 years ago	1924; 102 years ago	500	Pick n Pay Express; bp Express (in-house)	BP Rewards; Pick n Pay Smart Shopper; Discovery Vitality Drive; Nedbank Greenbacks	
Sasol	South African	Sandton, Gauteng	Publicly traded; Public Investment Corporation (20.19%); Industrial Development Corporation (8.20%)	1950; 76 years ago	2004; 22 years ago	354	Sasol Delight (in-house)	Sasol Rewards; Absa Rewards	
Puma Energy	Foreign-owned	Johannesburg, Gauteng	Trafigura-related companies (96.75%)	1997; 29 years ago	2015; 11 years ago	118	Circle K; OK Express (by Shoprite Holdings)	Puma Pris	

== Industry associations ==
The interests of the South African petroleum industry are represented by the Fuels Industry Association of South Africa (FIASA), formerly known as SAPIA, of which all the major gas station retail companies are members. Established in 1994, the association represents companies involved in the production, distribution, and marketing of fuel products and engages with government and other stakeholders on issues affecting the industry, including regulation, security of supply, environmental standards, fuel pricing, and the energy transition.

The South African Petroleum Retailers' Association (SAPRA) also represents petroleum retailers and service station operators. It provides members with guidance on regulatory compliance, labor matters, fuel supply, fuel pricing, training, and other issues affecting the operation of petroleum retail businesses.

== Economic importance ==
Engen gas station in Tokai, Cape Town. The company is the largest consumer gas retailer by number of locations

The petroleum industry is an important component of the South African economy, with petroleum products used extensively in road-based logistics, aviation, agriculture, mining, manufacturing, construction, and other economic activities. The availability and price of gasoline and diesel therefore have a direct effect on the cost of transporting people and goods, while changes in fuel prices can impact the prices of other goods and services.

The industry is also an important source of government revenue. Petrol and diesel are subject to the general fuel levy, and other duties and taxes. The fuel levy is one of the South African government's largest individual tax instruments, having accounted for approximately 5% of total tax revenue in 2025. In addition to the general fuel levy, petroleum products generate value added tax and other revenue.

The petroleum industry also contributes to manufacturing and industrial activity through crude oil refining, synthetic fuel production, petroleum storage, transportation, and the manufacture and distribution of petroleum products. Statistics South Africa classifies petroleum within the petroleum, chemical products, rubber, and plastic products division of manufacturing, which has been among the contributors to changes in South African manufacturing output.

The industry is strategically important to South Africa's energy security because domestic crude oil refining capacity has declined substantially, as several refineries have been shut down over the years. As a result, South Africa imports a significant share of its refined petroleum products, the domestic economy is impacted by international oil prices, global refining capacity, shipping costs, geopolitical disruptions, and fluctuations in the rand exchange rate. The government has consequently identified reliable petroleum supply as an economic and national security priority. As a result, the national government's Central Energy Fund (CEF) purchased the SAPREF Refinery from BP and Shell in 2024, and intends to restart operations there.

Petroleum infrastructure is also important to the inland economy, which includes Gauteng. State-owned rail, port, and pipeline company Transnet's petroleum pipeline network transports refined products from the coast to inland markets, with the Durban-to-Alrode system supplying a substantial proportion of the petroleum products consumed in the inland economy. Disruptions or constraints affecting refineries, pipelines, ports, storage facilities, or imports can therefore have consequences for transport costs, industrial production, and economic activity beyond the petroleum industry itself.

=== Economic value ===
In 2025, overall fuel sales in SA were estimated at R588 billion.

In 2022, the petroleum industry had a total combined contribution of 3% to the country's GDP.

== Environmental impact ==
Environmental impacts from the petroleum industry are regulated primarily by the Department of Forestry, Fisheries and the Environment (DFFE), which is responsible for national environmental policy and legislation, national government-level environmental impact assessments, and the protection of both land and coastal environments. Environmental compliance and enforcement are undertaken through the Environmental Management Inspectorate; a network of officials from national, provincial, and local government institutions and conservation authorities. Environmental Management Inspectors have powers to investigate environmental offences, conduct inspections, obtain evidence, and enforce environmental legislation.

The DFFE is responsible for combating marine oil pollution. Marine pollution from petroleum tankers and other ships is subject to a separate maritime regulatory framework. The South African Maritime Safety Authority (SAMSA) is responsible for preventing and combating pollution from ships, and administers legislation including the Marine Pollution (Control and Civil Liability) Act, 1981 and the Marine Pollution (Prevention of Pollution from Ships) Act, 1986.

The Department of Mineral and Petroleum Resources is responsible for the regulation of petroleum resources and petroleum industry activities within its mandate, while provincial and municipal authorities have environmental responsibilities within their respective areas of jurisdiction. The environmental regulatory framework is principally established by the National Environmental Management Act, 1998, together with other, more specific environmental legislation.

South Africa is one of the most biodiverse countries in the world, and is part of a group of just 17 megadiverse countries. The South African Government has therefore developed numerous pieces of legislation aimed at protecting the country's natural environment.

== Regulation ==
The industry is regulated primarily by the Department of Mineral and Petroleum Resources, under a number of laws governing the exploration, production, refining, distribution, and sale of petroleum products. The principal legislation governing the downstream petroleum industry is the Petroleum Products Act, 1977 (Act 120 of 1977), which regulates the manufacturing, wholesaling, and retailing of petroleum products; provides for licensing of participants in the industry; regulates petroleum product specifications and standards; and provides for the regulation of fuel prices.

The Petroleum Pipelines Act, 2003 (Act 60 of 2003) provides the regulatory framework for the construction, operation, and use of petroleum pipelines, storage facilities, and loading facilities, while the Mineral and Petroleum Resources Development Act, 2002 (Act 28 of 2002) historically provided the principal framework for access to and development of the country's petroleum resources. The upstream sector is now additionally governed by the Upstream Petroleum Resources Development Act, 2024 (Act 23 of 2024).

Fuel prices are regulated through a government pricing system under the Petroleum Products Act. The Minister of Mineral and Petroleum Resources announces adjustments to regulated fuel prices, which are generally made monthly and take account of international crude oil and petroleum product prices, exchange rates, import costs, and domestic factors. The Central Energy Fund assists the government in administering the fuel pricing system and publishes the underlying price calculations for the public.

The South African petroleum industry is also subject to environmental, health and safety, and competition legislation, including the National Environmental Management Act, 1998, the National Water Act, 1998, the Occupational Health and Safety Act, 1993, and the Competition Act, 1998.

== See also ==
- Economy of South Africa
- Automotive industry in South Africa
- Transport in South Africa
