= Department of Mineral Resources =

Department of Mineral Resources may refer to:

- Department of Mineral Resources (South Africa)
- Department of Mineral Resources (Thailand)
