= Mmamoloko Kubayi =

South African politician

The Honourable Mmamoloko Kubayi MP
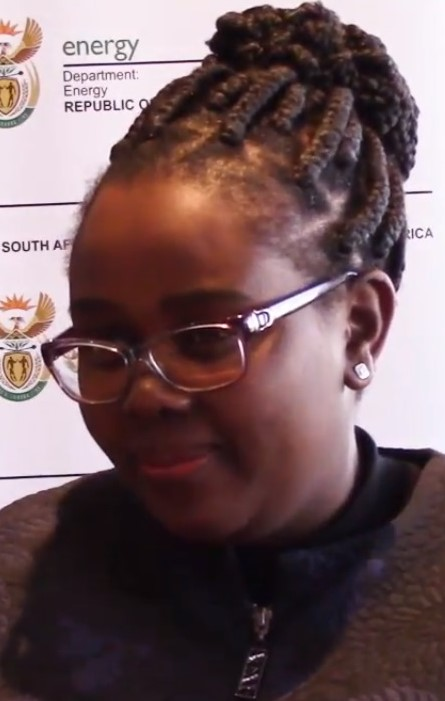
- Kubayi in August 2017

Minister of Justice and Constitutional Development
- Incumbent
- Assumed office 3 December 2024
- President: Cyril Ramaphosa
- Deputy: Andries Nel
- Preceded by: Thembi Simelane

Minister of Human Settlements
- In office 5 August 2021 – 3 December 2024
- President: Cyril Ramaphosa
- Deputy: Pam Tshwete; Tandi Mahambehlala
- Preceded by: Lindiwe Sisulu (for Human Settlements, Water and Sanitation)
- Succeeded by: Thembi Simelane
Prior cabinet offices 2017–2021
Minister of Tourism
In office 30 May 2019 – 5 August 2021
President	Cyril Ramaphosa
Deputy	Fish Mahlalela
Preceded by	Derek Hanekom
Succeeded by	Lindiwe Sisulu
Minister of Science and Technology
In office 27 February 2018 – 29 May 2019
President	Cyril Ramaphosa
Deputy	Zanele kaMagwaza-Msibi
Preceded by	Naledi Pandor
Succeeded by	Blade Nzimande (for Higher Education, Science and Technology)
Minister of Communications
In office 17 October 2017 – 26 February 2018
President	Jacob Zuma
Deputy	Tandi Mahambehlala
Preceded by	Ayanda Dlodlo
Succeeded by	Nomvula Mokonyane
Minister of Energy
In office 31 March 2017 – 17 October 2017
President	Jacob Zuma
Deputy	Thembi Majola
Preceded by	Tina Joemat-Pettersson
Succeeded by	David Mahlobo

Member of the National Assembly
- Incumbent
- Assumed office 6 May 2009

Personal details
- Born: Mmamoloko Tryphosa Kubayi; 8 May 1978 (age 48) Soweto, South Africa
- Party: African National Congress
- Spouse: Sihle Ngubane (m. 2017; div. 2021)
- Education: Vista University; University of Witwatersrand
- Nickname: Nkhensani

Mmamoloko Tryphosa Kubayi (born 8 May 1978) is a South African politician from Gauteng who is currently the Minister of Justice and Constitutional Development. She has represented the African National Congress (ANC) in the National Assembly of South Africa since April 2009.

Born in Soweto, Kubayi entered professional politics through the ANC Youth League and the City of Johannesburg Metropolitan Council. After her election to Parliament in 2009, she served as Deputy President Kgalema Motlanthe's parliamentary counsellor from 2013 to 2014 and as the chairperson of the Portfolio Committee on Telecommunications and Postal Services from 2014 to 2017.

In March 2017, President Jacob Zuma appointed her to the cabinet, first as Minister of Energy and then as Minister of Communications. Under Zuma's successor, President Cyril Ramaphosa, Kubayi served as Minister of Science and Technology from 2018 to 2019, Minister of Tourism from 2019 to 2021, and Minister of Human Settlements from 2021 to 2024, before she was appointed to her current portfolio in December 2024.

Kubayi has been a member of the ANC National Executive Committee since December 2017 and was elected to her first term on the ANC National Working Committee in January 2023. She was head of the party's influential subcommittee on economic transformation between April 2022 and March 2025.

== Early life and education ==
Kubayi was born on 8 May 1978 in Soweto, where she grew up in a shack in Meadowlands. She was raised by a single mother who was a domestic worker and African National Congress (ANC) supporter. Kubayi fell pregnant at the age of seventeen and gave birth at the beginning of her last year of high school. Shortly after giving birth, at her mother's insistence, she returned to school while her sister cared for her son, and she matriculated from the Thusa-Setjhaba Secondary School in 1997 with top marks.

After high school, Kubayi enrolled in the Soweto campus of Vista University, where she was involved in student politics as a member of the student representative council and chairperson of the university's South African Students Congress (SASCO) branch. She graduated in 2000 with a BA in psychology and sociology. In later years, while working, she completed a postgraduate diploma in project management from Damelin and a master's degree in public and development management from the Wits School of Governance. As of 2025, she was enrolled in a PhD at the University of Johannesburg, pursuing research on state-owned enterprises and corporate governance.

== Early career ==
Kubayi's first job was as an intern for the Interfaith Community Development Association, a non-governmental organisation run by Ishmael Mkhabela of the Azanian People's Organisation. She left the community development sector to work in skills development at First National Bank and then in the business banking division of Nedbank. Thereafter she entered the public sector, working as a skills development facilitator at the National Health Laboratory Service before she was recruited as a director in the Office of the Deputy President, then under deputy president Phumzile Mlambo-Ngcuka.

Meanwhile, Kubayi had remained politically active as a member of the ANC Youth League; she served in the regional executive committee of the league's Greater Johannesburg branch and was ultimately elected as the league's deputy provincial secretary in Gauteng. Between 2006 and 2009, she represented the ANC as a proportional-representation councillor in the City of Johannesburg Metropolitan Council, where she chaired the municipality's transport committee.

== Early parliamentary career ==
In the April 2009 general election, Kubayi stood successfully for election to an ANC seat in the National Assembly, the lower house of the South African Parliament. She later said that she was persuaded to stand as part of the ANC's ongoing push to promote youth representation in Parliament. She spent much of her first parliamentary term as a backbencher, serving as a party whip in the Portfolio Committee on Basic Education and Portfolio Committee on Higher Education between 2009 and 2011. She served a brief stint as acting Deputy Chief Whip of the Majority Party in 2013, and from June 2013 to May 2014 she was the parliamentary counsellor to the deputy president, Kgalema Motlanthe. The Mail & Guardian later praised her attendance record and reputed work ethic in Parliament.

Kubayi was re-elected to the National Assembly in the May 2014 general election, and after the election the ANC nominated her to chair Parliament's new Portfolio Committee on Telecommunications and Postal Services. The committee was created to oversee the newly created Ministry of Telecommunications and Postal Services, led by Siyabonga Cwele. Kubayi was elected unopposed to the chair during the committee's first meeting on 24 June 2014.

During her three years as a committee chair, Kubayi was also reputed for her public support of incumbent president Jacob Zuma. She served on the ad hoc parliamentary committee that absolved Zuma of wrongdoing in the Nkandlagate scandal, and she was noted for her strident defense of Zuma during parliamentary debates on the scandal, which she described as a "deliberate attempt to discredit ANC leadership." She later explained that she was attracted to Zuma's leadership in part because "I'm also a bit of a traditionalist."

== Career in national government ==
=== Energy: 2017 ===
In March 2017, President Zuma appointed Kubayi as the new Minister of Energy, a surprise promotion; according to News24, she became the youngest member of the cabinet. Stephen Grootes suggested that she had been selected simply because she was "beholden" to Zuma; her predecessor, Tina Joemat-Pettersson, was widely believed to have been sacked because of delays in implementing Zuma's controversial nuclear procurement programme. Kubayi publicly recommitted the ministry to the nuclear programme, but she also emphasized her sensitivity to the importance of legal compliance and adequate public transparency.

Meanwhile, during her maiden budget speech in May 2017, Kubayi announced a controversial reconfiguration of the Central Energy Fund (CEF) that entailed transferring the public Petroleum Agency of South Africa and African Exploration Mining and Finance Corporation to the custodianship of the Department of Mineral Resources. Also in May, she gave the first official confirmation that the state had sold a significant portion of South Africa's strategic oil reserves in 2015. Kubayi contradicted Joemat-Pettersson's description of the transaction as a mere strategic rotation of stock, telling Parliament that a sale had taken place at discounted prices and without the formal approval of the CEF board. In August 2017 Kubayi suspended the CEF board pending an investigation into the decision.

Kubayi served just over six months in the energy portfolio before Zuma transferred her in an abrupt cabinet reshuffle in October 2017, replacing her with David Mahlobo. Observers speculated that, like her predecessor, she had been judged too cautious in her pursuit of nuclear procurement.

=== Communications: 2017–2018 ===
Kubayi was named as Minister of Communications in Zuma's October 2017 reshuffle. The ministry, most recently led by Faith Muthambi and Ayanda Dlodlo, was viewed as crisis-ridden, and Kubayi promised to bring stability and continuity to the portfolio.

While in the office, in December 2017, Kubayi attended the ANC's 54th National Conference, which elected her to a five-year term on the ANC National Executive Committee (NEC); by number of votes received, she was ranked 63rd of the 80 ordinary members elected to the committee. Ahead of the conference, she had openly supported Nkosazana Dlamini-Zuma's unsuccessful bid for the ANC presidency.

=== Science and Technology: 2018–2019 ===
Cyril Ramaphosa was elected to replace Zuma as president in February 2018 and he named Kubayi as Minister of Science and Technology in his inaugural cabinet reshuffle later that month. During Kubayi's brief tenure in the portfolio, her department launched a draft science, technology, and innovation policy in September 2018. It also spearheaded South Africa's membership in the World Economic Forum's Centre for the Fourth Industrial Revolution (C4IR) Network and the launch of an affiliate centre at the Council for Scientific and Industrial Research, and Kubayi was nominated for membership on C4IR's global Artificial Intelligence Council in 2019. The Mail & Guardian complimented Kubayi for her rising international profile and for her reputation as "a staunch processes person."

=== Tourism: 2019–2021 ===
After the May 2019 general election, President Ramaphosa appointed Kubayi to succeed Derek Hanekom as Minister of Tourism. Over the next 18 months, her critics were scathing of her putative failure to mitigate the impact of the COVID-19 pandemic and lockdown on the local tourism industry; particularly unpopular were her decisions to ban all food delivery services and severely to curb short-term rentals to foreigners through platforms like Airbnb. Solidarity and AfriForum also challenged the ministry's decision to use black economic empowerment compliance as a criterion for allocating the Tourism Equity Fund's financial relief to distressed tourism companies, but the policy was upheld in the North Gauteng High Court.

For the last two months of her tenure in the tourism portfolio, Kubayi doubled as the acting Minister of Health. Ramaphosa appointed her to the position on 8 June 2021 after the incumbent minister, Zweli Mkhize, was placed on special leave over corruption allegations. The health portfolio was viewed as particularly challenging because of the ongoing COVID-19 pandemic and vaccine rollout, and several observers questioned Kubayi's qualifications for the position.

=== Human Settlements: 2021–2024 ===
In a cabinet reshuffle on 5 August 2021, President Ramaphosa appointed Kubayi as Minister of Human Settlements. In that capacity she was responsible for the development of a major new white paper on housing. The Mail & Guardian complimented her financial and administrative management of the department but noted that the department failed to reach important delivery targets or to provide adequate emergency housing during a spate of flooding in several provinces.

In April 2022, the ANC announced that Kubayi had been appointed as chairperson of the NEC's influential subcommittee on economic transformation; she replaced Enoch Godongwana, who stepped down after his appointment as finance minister. In the months that followed, Kubayi campaigned as a potential candidate for election as ANC deputy president at the party's upcoming elective conference, touting the importance of female representation in the party leadership. She also publicly supported Ramaphosa's bid for re-election as an ANC president, and publicly defended his controversial step-aside policy. While Ramaphosa's re-election campaign succeeded, Kubayi failed to gain the endorsement of the ANC Women's League or to receive sufficient support from party branches to appear on the ballot for the deputy president position.

Nonetheless, at the ANC's 55th National Conference in December 2022, she was re-elected to the NEC; she received 1,730 votes across roughly 4,000 ballots, making her the twelfth-most popular member of the committee. At the new committee's first meeting in February 2023, she was appointed to continue as head of the subcommittee on economic transformation, with Zuko Godlimpi as her deputy. She was also elected to the powerful National Working Committee; with the support of 57 of the NEC's 80 members, she was the most popular candidate.

=== Justice and Constitutional Development: 2024–present ===
Kubayi was reappointed as Minister of Human Settlements after the May 2024 general election. However, on 3 December 2024, President Ramaphosa announced a minor cabinet reshuffle in which Kubayi swopped portfolios with Thembi Simelane, a minister embroiled in a corruption scandal; Kubayi thus ascended to the relatively senior office of Minister of Justice and Constitutional Development. By that time she was viewed as a close ally of Ramaphosa. She said that in her new portfolio she would prioritize court infrastructure and prosecution of state capture criminal cases.

In March 2025, the ANC announced that Godlimpi had replaced Kubayi as chairperson of the ANC's economic transformation committee. Kubayi's spokesperson said that she had asked to step back from the position due to her new responsibilities in the government, but others told the press that she was removed after clashing with finance minister Godongwana over his proposals for the 2025 budget speech. In the reshuffled ANC executive, Kubayi was appointed as the NEC's delegate to Limpopo Province.

== Personal life ==
Between 2017 and 2021, Kubayi was married to Sihle Ngubane, a businessman who later entered politics in the MK Party. They had a child together, Kubayi's second. During their marriage, media questioned the propriety of public contracts awarded to Ngubane's company.
