= Minister of Mineral and Petroleum Resources =

South Africa Minister of Mineral and Petroleum Resources
- Flag of South Africa

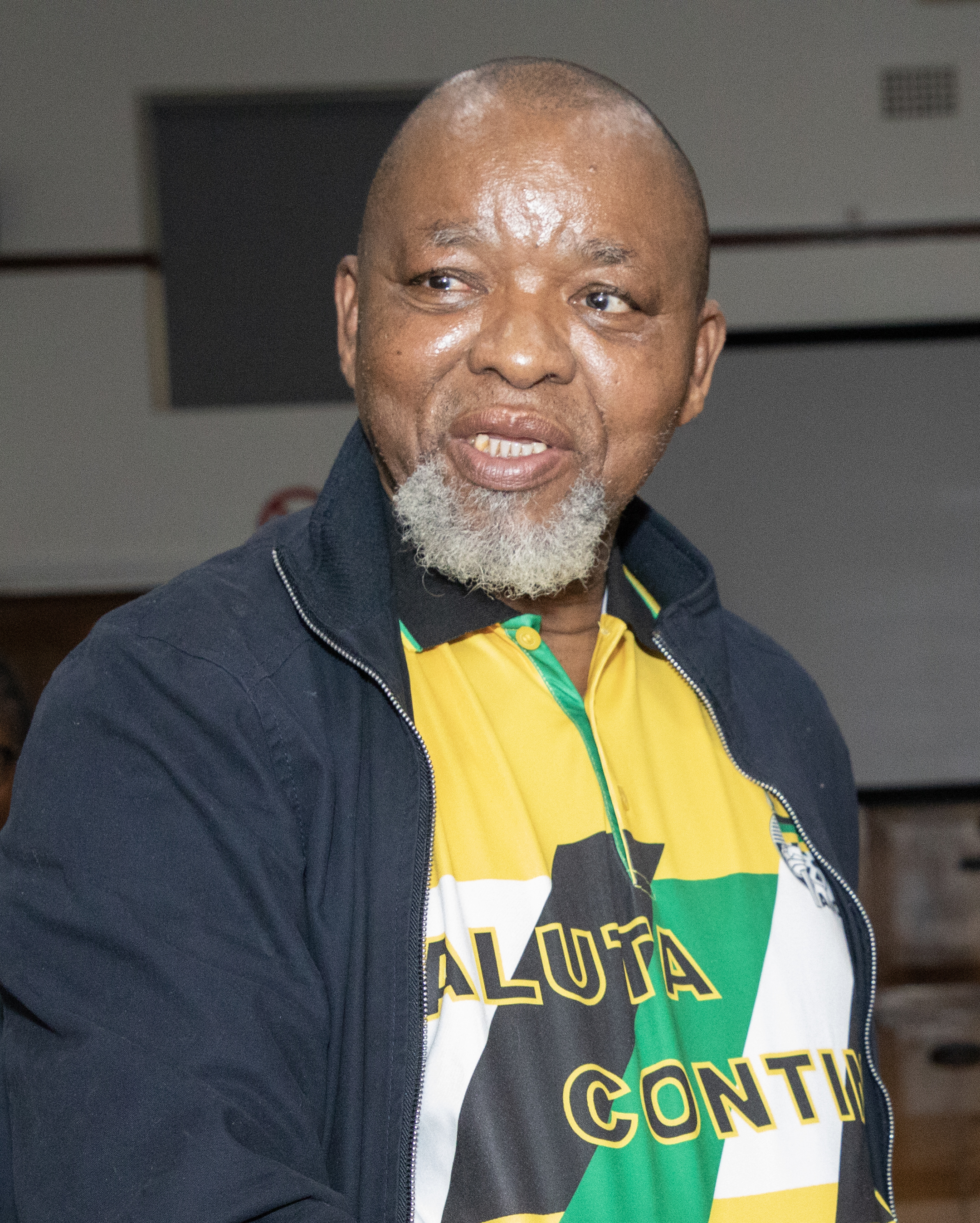
- Incumbent; Gwede Mantashe since 27 February 2018
- Department of Mineral Resources and Energy
- Style: The Honourable
- Appointer: President of South Africa
- Deputy: Judith Tshabalala
- Salary: R2,401,633
- Website: Department of Mineral Resources and Energy

The minister of mineral and petroleum resources is a minister in the cabinet of the South African national government. The minister has political responsibility for the Department of Mineral Resources and Energy.

The office in its current form was re-established in June 2024; it formerly existed between May 2009 and May 2019, initially as the minister of mining and then as the minister for mineral resources. During other periods, the mineral resources portfolio has been enlarged by the inclusion of energy: there was a minister of minerals and energy before May 2009 and, more recently, a minister of mineral resources and energy between May 2019 and June 2024.

The current minister of mineral resources is Gwede Mantashe, who was also the last minister of mineral resources and energy; he has overseen the mineral resources portfolio since February 2018.

== Post-apartheid history ==
In the Government of National Unity (GNU) between 1994 and 1999, the mineral resources portfolio was part of the brief of the minister of minerals and energy, a post that had also existed during apartheid. Pik Botha of the National Party was the minister between 1994 and 1996; he was the last politician to oversee mineral resources who was not a member of the African National Congress. In 1999, the Ministry of Minerals and Energy became the first ministry in the history of the South African government in which both top positions were filled by women (with Phumzile Mlambo-Ngcuka as minister and Susan Shabangu as her deputy).

When he announced his first cabinet on 10 May 2009, President Jacob Zuma bifurcated the Department of Minerals and Energy into two disparate departments. The Department of Mineral Resources was henceforth overseen by the minister of mineral resources (initially called the minister of mining), while the Department of Energy was overseen by a new minister of energy.

Appointing his second cabinet on 29 May 2019, President Cyril Ramaphosa announced that the minerals portfolio would again be merged with the energy portfolio, as it had been before Zuma's tenure. Soon after the ministries were merged into the Ministry of Mineral Resources and Energy, the respective departments were likewise merged into the Department of Mineral Resources and Energy. This merger lasted only five years: on 30 June 2024, appointing his third cabinet, Ramaphosa announced that energy would be detached from the mineral resources portfolio again, now becoming the prerogative of a new minister of electricity and energy, and a separate minister of mineral and petroleum resources would be appointed.

== List of ministers ==
List of ministers responsible for minerals and mining, 1994–present
Portfolio	Minister	Term		Party	President
Minerals and energy	Pik Botha	1994	1996	NP	Mandela (I)
Minerals and energy	Penuell Maduna	1996	1999	ANC	Mandela (I)
Minerals and energy	Phumzile Mlambo-Ngcuka	1999	2004	ANC	Mbeki (I)
Minerals and energy	Lindiwe Hendricks	2004	2006	ANC	Mbeki (II)
Minerals and energy	Buyelwa Sonjica	2006	2009	ANC	Mbeki (II) and Motlanthe (I)
Mineral resources	Susan Shabangu	2009	2014	ANC	Zuma (I)
Mineral resources	Ngoako Ramathlodi	2014	2015	ANC	Zuma (II)
Mineral resources	Mosebenzi Zwane	2015	2018	ANC	Zuma (II)
Mineral resources	Gwede Mantashe	2018	2019	ANC	Ramaphosa (I)
Mineral resources and energy	Gwede Mantashe	2019	2024	ANC	Ramaphosa (II)
Mineral and petroleum resources	Gwede Mantashe	2024	–	ANC	Ramaphosa (III)

== List of deputy ministers ==
List of deputy ministers responsible for minerals and mining, 1994–present
Portfolio	Minister	Term		Party	President
Minerals and energy	No deputy minister from 1994 to 1996.				
Minerals and energy	Susan Shabangu	1996	2004	ANC	Mandela (I) and Mbeki (I)
Minerals and energy	Lulu Xingwana	2004	2006	ANC	Mbeki (II)
Minerals and energy	No deputy minister from 2006 to 2010.				
Mineral resources	Godfrey Oliphant	2010	2019	ANC	Zuma (I), Zuma (II) and Ramaphosa (I)
Mineral resources and energy	Bavelile Hlongwa	2019	2019	ANC	Ramaphosa (II)
Mineral resources and energy	Nobuhle Nkabane	2021	2024	ANC	Ramaphosa (II)
Mineral and petroleum resources	Phumzile Mgcina	2024	—	ANC	Ramaphosa (III)

== See also ==
- Petroleum industry in South Africa
- Mining in South Africa
- African Exploration Mining and Finance Corporation
