= Puma Energy Africa =

Southern African oil and gas subsidiary

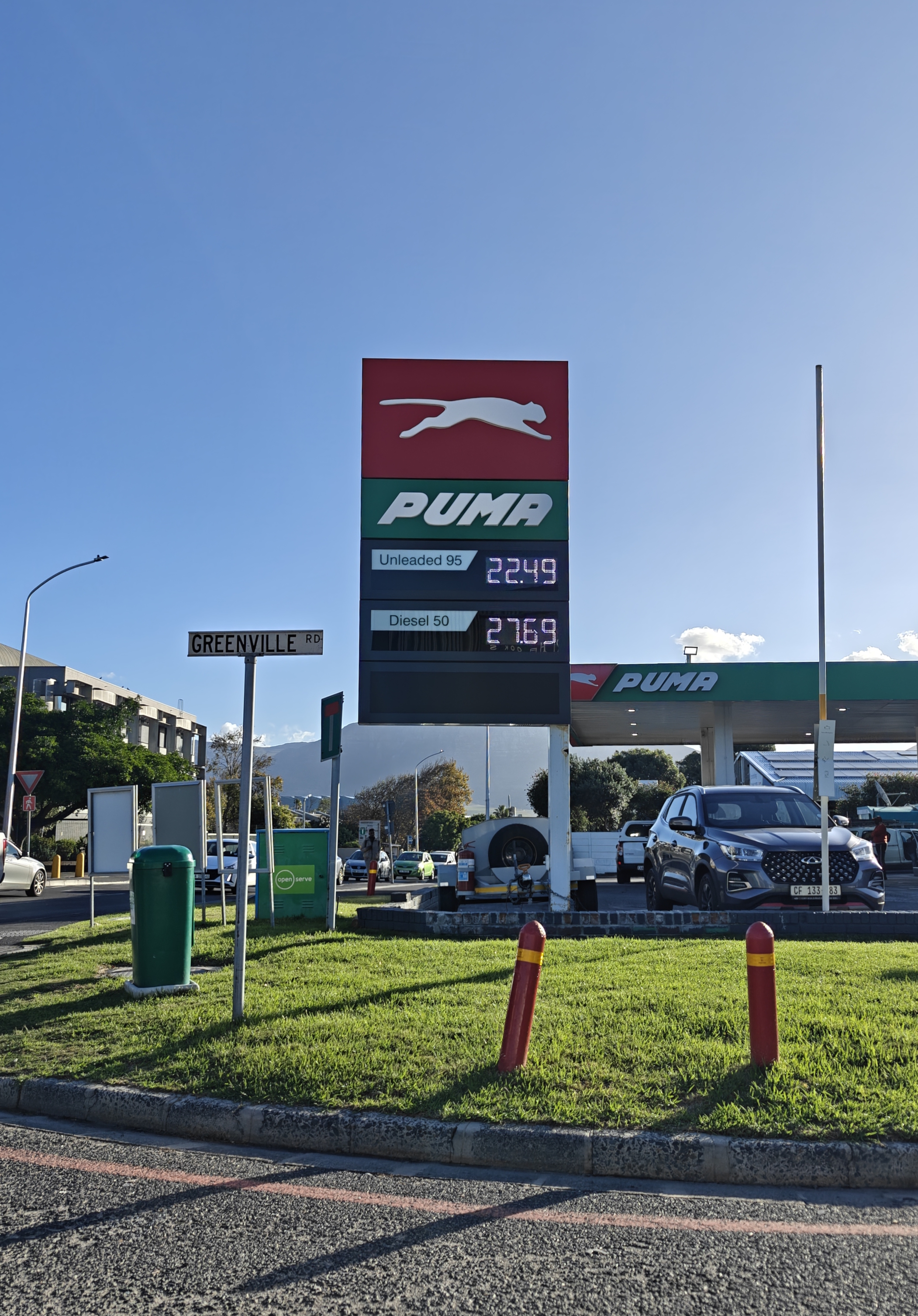
- Puma Energy gas station in Cape Town
- Type: Subsidiary
- Industry: Petroleum
- Founded: 2002; 24 years ago
- Headquarters: Sandton, Gauteng, South Africa
- Number of locations: 707 (2025)
- Area served: 16 countries in Africa
- Products: Gasoline; Lubricants
- Parent: Puma Energy
- Website: pumaenergy.com/country/south-africa

Puma Energy Africa is a South African petroleum company, headquartered in Sandton, Gauteng. Founded in 2002, it is a subsidiary of Swiss company Puma Energy.

As of 2025, Puma Energy Africa operates 707 gas stations across 16 countries on the continent. A total of 118 of them are situated in South Africa, making it the country's smallest consumer gas retail chain (out of seven) by number of locations.

== History ==
Puma Energy Africa was founded in 2002, when parent company Puma Energy expanded into Congo-Brazzaville. The company subsequently began operating in Ghana, Mozambique, Nigeria, Ivory Coast, the Democratic Republic of Congo, and Angola.

In 2011 Puma acquired competitor BP's downstream assets in Namibia (100%), Botswana (100%), Zambia (75%), Malawi (50%), and Tanzania (50%).

In 2015, the company entered the South African market, through its acquisition of Brent Oil and Drakensberg Oil's retail assets and lubricant business. Puma previously only held a wholesale fuel license in South Africa, and gained the ability to operate in the retail space through these acquisitions. The company bought 40 existing gas stations in the Kwa-Zulu Natal and Mpumalanga provinces, which were rebranded.

In November of the same year, Puma opened an 11 tank fuel terminal in Matola, Mozambique. The terminal, with its 110 000 m³ of storage capacity, was built in large part to service the South African fuel market.

In November 2025, Puma Energy was one of multiple global oil companies to express interest in acquiring Shell South Africa's downstream assets, when it was announced that Shell would be exiting the South African market. Puma later decided not to proceed with a bid.

== Operations ==
As of 2025, Puma operates 707 gas stations throughout Africa, 118 of which are located in its home country of SA. The company has operations across 54 fuel terminals, and serves 96 airports.

The company is involved in numerous petroleum sectors, including refining, storage, commercial supply, wholesaling, lubricants, aviation fuel, LPG and natural gas, bitumen, and retail fuel services.

The company has a partnership with US chain Circle K to operate co-located convenience stores in South Africa.

Along with its major competitors, Puma Energy Africa is a member of the Fuels Industry Association of South Africa, an industry stakeholder group.

== See also ==
- Petroleum industry in South Africa
- Puma Energy
