= Minister of Electricity and Energy =

South African cabinet position

- Flag of South Africa

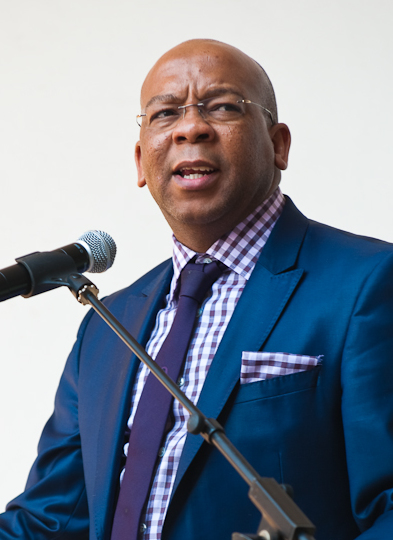
- Incumbent; Kgosientso Ramokgopa since 3 July 2024
- Department of Electricity and Energy
- Style: The Honourable
- Appointer: President of South Africa
- Inaugural holder: Kgosientso Ramokgopa
- Formation: 3 July 2024
- Deputy: Samantha Graham

The minister of electricity and energy is the energy minister in the Cabinet of South Africa. The office in its current form was established in June 2024 in a merger between the minister in the presidency for electricity and the energy functions of the minister of mineral resources and energy. The energy portfolio was formerly the provenance of the minister of energy between 2009 and 2019.

During other periods, the energy portfolio was conjoined with other portfolios, including under the minister of minerals and energy, until 1994, and under the minister of mineral resources and energy from 2019 to 2024. The minister in the presidency responsible for electricity was appointed for the first time in March 2023 and had a mandate to oversee the government's response to the ongoing electricity crisis.

The incumbent minister of electricity and energy is Kgosientso Ramokgopa of the African National Congress, who was also the first and only minister in the presidency for electricity.

== Post-apartheid history ==
In the Government of National Unity (GNU) between 1994 and 1999, the energy portfolio was part of the brief of the minister of minerals and energy, a post that had also existed during apartheid. Pik Botha of the National Party was the minister between 1994 and 1996, making him the last politician to hold the office who was not a member of the African National Congress.

=== Zuma presidency: 2009–2018 ===
When he announced his first cabinet on 10 May 2009, President Jacob Zuma bifurcated the Department of Minerals and Energy into two disparate departments. The Department of Energy and Department of Mineral Resources were henceforth overseen by a minister of energy and minister of mineral resources respectively. The minister of energy gained a deputy minister from 31 October 2010.

Over the next decade, during Zuma's presidency, the Ministry of Energy was frequently the target of cabinet reshuffles. Commentators linked the dismissals of energy ministers to Zuma's efforts to carry out a proposed nuclear power deal with Russia.

=== Ramaphosa presidency: 2018–present ===
Appointing his second cabinet on 29 May 2019, President Cyril Ramaphosa announced that the energy portfolio would be merged with the minerals portfolio, as it had been before Zuma's tenure. Soon after the ministries were merged into the Ministry of Mineral Resources and Energy, the respective departments were likewise merged into the Department of Mineral Resources and Energy.

During his State of the Nation Address on 9 February 2023, Ramaphosa announced his intention to appoint a minister of electricity, based in the presidency, to oversee all aspects of the country's response to the ongoing electricity crisis, including leading the National Energy Crisis Committee. The first minister in the presidency for electricity, Kgosientso Ramokgopa, was appointed in a cabinet reshuffle on 6 March 2023.

Among other things, the minister of electricity had responsibility for procurement of new electricity generation capacity. However, he served alongside the incumbent mineral resources and energy minister, Gwede Mantashe, and there was uncertainty about the delineation of functions between them – especially given that a third minister, the minister of public enterprises, oversaw Eskom.

On 30 June 2024, appointing his third cabinet, Ramaphosa announced that the relevant ministries would be reconfigured: energy would be detached from the mineral resources portfolio and become the sole prerogative of a new minister of electricity and energy.

== List of ministers ==
List of ministers responsible for energy, 1994–present
Portfolio	Minister	Term		Party	President
Minerals and Energy	Pik Botha	1994	1996	NP	Mandela (I)
Minerals and Energy	Penuell Maduna	1996	1999	ANC	Mandela (I)
Minerals and Energy	Phumzile Mlambo-Ngcuka	1999	2004	ANC	Mbeki (I)
Minerals and Energy	Lindiwe Hendricks	2004	2006	ANC	Mbeki (II)
Minerals and Energy	Buyelwa Sonjica	2006	2009	ANC	Mbeki (II) and Motlanthe (I)
Energy	Dipuo Peters	2009	2013	ANC	Zuma (I)
Energy	Ben Martins	2013	2014	ANC	Zuma (I)
Energy	Tina Joemat-Pettersson	2014	2017	ANC	Zuma (II)
Energy	Mmamoloko Kubayi	2017	2017	ANC	Zuma (II)
Energy	David Mahlobo	2017	2018	ANC	Zuma (II)
Energy	Jeff Radebe	2018	2019	ANC	Ramaphosa (I)
Mineral Resources and Energy	Gwede Mantashe	2019	2024	ANC	Ramaphosa (II)
Electricity	Kgosientso Ramokgopa	2023	2024	ANC	Ramaphosa (II)
Electricity and Energy	Kgosientso Ramokgopa	2024	–	ANC	Ramaphosa (III)
