= Fuels Industry Association of South Africa =

The Fuels Industry Association of South Africa
- Nickname: FIASA
- Predecessor: The South African Petroleum Industry Association (SAPIA)
- Formation: 1994; 32 years ago
- Type: Industry association
- Legal status: Active
- Location: Johannesburg, Gauteng, South Africa
- Region served: South Africa
- Members: 10 (2025)
- Key people: Seelan Naidoo (Chairman); Avhapfani Tshifularo (CEO)
- Website: fuelsindustry.org.za

The Fuels Industry Association of South Africa (FIASA) is a South African association focused on the operations, continuation, and success of the country's petroleum industry.

FIASA actively engages with stakeholders involved in the industry, provides research and advice, and communicates the industry's stances to the public, the media, and the government.

== History ==
The South African Petroleum Industry Association (SAPIA) was founded in July 1994, under the guidance of then-president Nelson Mandela, in order to represent the collective interests of the South African fuels industry, and to usher South Africa’s vital fuels industry into a new democratic era.

The organization was founded by 7 major petroleum companies operating in South Africa, namely: BP, Caltex, Engen Petroleum, Shell, Sasol, Total, and Zenex Oil (which became part of Engen, and is therefore no longer a member).

SAPIA was in the media in early 1995, discussing the protection that Sasol (then not yet a SAPIA member) received from the South African government. In protest, SAPIA withdrew from the National Economic Development & Labour Council (NEDLAC) initiative's liquid fuels task team, and was strongly criticized for this move, especially by local trade union Cosatu.

Sasol and Tepco Petroleum joined the organisation in 2000.

Mossgas was replaced as a member by PetroSA in 2002.

In 2017, Swiss mining and commodity trading company, Glencore, bought Chevron's Southern African assets for R1 billion. A new, Cape Town-based petroleum company, Astron Energy, began operating the former Caltex gas stations and the company's former oil refinery. It replaced Caltex as a FIASA member. In 2022, Astron began rebranding Caltex gas stations to Astron Energy.

In September 2023, FIASA announced its support for the South African government-mandated Clean Fuels 2 initiative. The country's Department of Mineral Resources and Energy (DMRE) mandated the implementation of the program as of 1 July 2027. The Clean Fuels 2 initiative caps gas and diesel sold to consumers at a maximum of 10 ppm sulphur (by weight), and places further constraints on some components in petrol, namely benzene, aromatics, and olefins. The program is aimed at improving tailpipe emissions and contributing towards South Africa's efforts to combat climate change.

In 2024, SAPIA changed its name to the Fuels Industry Association of South Africa (FIASA), to reflect its commitment to a sustainable future for the fuels industry. At the time, FIASA Executive Director Avhapfani Tshifularo stated that the organization's intention was to diversify the types of energy sectors it worked with, secure South Africa's energy future, and advance low-carbon fuels and sustainable energy.

As part of the same announcement, FIASA affirmed its support for the South African government's Just Energy Transition. FIASA stated that the new 2027 Clean Fuels Program should allow new kinds of vehicles to be introduced into the local market, and other, cleaner energy sources should become more dominant, including sustainable aviation fuel and biofuels blended into fossil fuels. FIASA said the electrification of transport has the potential to reduce the demand for oil, and that the organization wants to be part of decarbonizing the economy and addressing climate change.

In January 2025, FIASA, in collaboration with Sasol, Airports Company South Africa (ACSA), and the Department of Transport, secured over 121 million liters of jet fuel for import via the port of Durban, to mitigate a shortage at O. R. Tambo International Airport. The shortage at South Africa's busiest airport by passenger volume was caused by a fire at the Natref refinery. The fuel is expected to be received via 3 vessels in February 2025, and several mitigation measures were implemented to prevent further potential disruptions, including increased rail deliveries and alternative fuel sourcing.

== Operations ==
As of 2022, collectively, FIASA members contribute 3% to South Africa's GDP. The country's liquid fuel demand exceeds refinery production, making it a net importer. FIASA members supply 17% of South Africa’s primary energy needs through annual sales of 24.5 billion liters of liquid fuels.

Combined, FIASA members serve 5,500 fuel stations around South Africa, 5 international airports, and commercial and industrial customers. The organization's members operate 4 refineries - 3 for crude oil and 1 for coal-to-liquid and gas-to-liquid fuels.

One of FIASA's goals is to ensure that all interested parties clearly understand the contribution that the petroleum industry makes to the economic and social development of South Africa.

The organization is managed by a board with representation from each of the member companies.

The FIASA website provides information as to how fuel prices in South Africa are determined (many liquid fuels in South Africa are subject to price controls). The site also has information on the demand for liquid fuel in South Africa.

== Members ==
Members of FIASA are all major petroleum companies in South Africa. As of 2025, the organization has 10 members:

- Engen Petroleum
- Sasol
- PetroSA
- Shell
- BP
- Astron Energy
- Total
- Puma Energy
- Vopak
- Prax Group

Zenex Oil used to be a member, and later formed part of Engen.

== See also ==
- Petroleum industry in South Africa
