= Third cabinet of Cyril Ramaphosa =

South African cabinet since 2024

Government of National Unity; Third Ramaphosa Cabinet
- 9th Cabinet of the Republic of South Africa (since the 1994 election)
- 2024–present
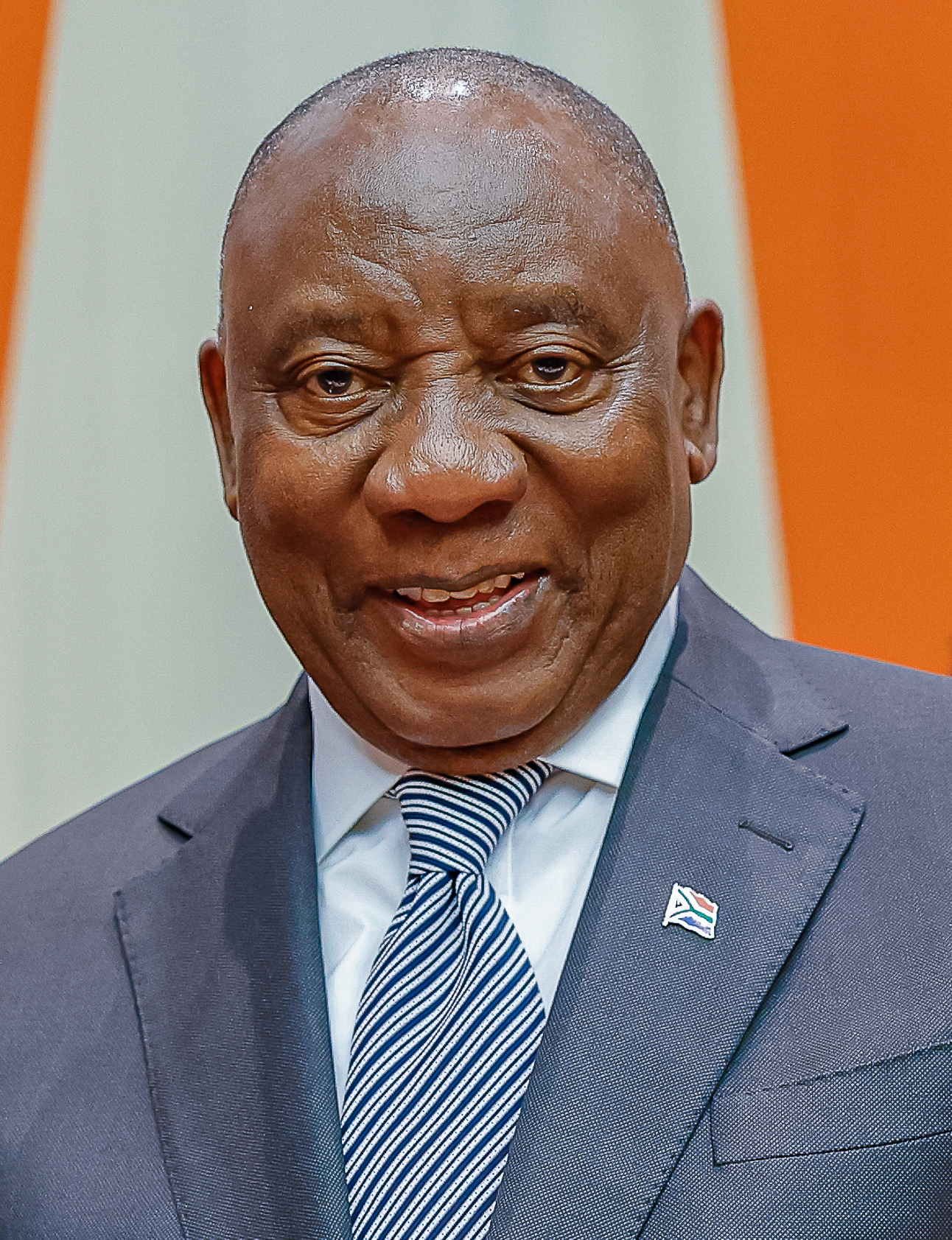
- Cyril Ramaphosa (2024)
- Date formed: 30 June 2024 (2 years, 1 month and 28 days)

People and organisations
- President: Cyril Ramaphosa
- Deputy President: Paul Mashatile
- No. of ministers: 32 ministers
- Member parties: African National Congress; Democratic Alliance; Inkatha Freedom Party; Patriotic Alliance; Good; Pan Africanist Congress; Freedom Front Plus; United Democratic Movement; Rise Mzansi; Al Jama-ah
- Status in legislature: Majority (national unity)
- Opposition parties: Progressive Caucus
- Opposition leaders: John Hlophe

History
- Election: 2024 election
- Legislature term: Seventh Parliament
- Predecessor: Ramaphosa II

The third cabinet of Cyril Ramaphosa, also known as the Government of National Unity (GNU), is the incumbent cabinet of the Government of South Africa. It was appointed on 30 June 2024 after the May 2024 general election resulted in a hung parliament. Ramaphosa's African National Congress (ANC), having lost its absolute majority, formed a ten-member coalition government.

The coalition was formed on 14 June 2024, when the Democratic Alliance, Inkatha Freedom Party, and Patriotic Alliance joined the ANC in supporting Ramaphosa's election to a second full term as President of South Africa. All four original members of the coalition are represented in the cabinet, as are three later entrants, the Good Party, Pan Africanist Congress, and Freedom Front Plus. The United Democratic Movement and Al Jama-ah are represented by deputy ministers, and Rise Mzansi participates in the legislative coalition but is not represented in the national executive.

The government operates with a comfortable majority in the National Assembly. It is the first coalition government in South Africa since the constitutionally mandated post-apartheid Government of National Unity, and it marks the first time that the ANC has had to govern without an absolute majority in its own right.

== Background ==
A South African general election was held on 29 May 2024 to elect the 28th Parliament of South Africa. Support for the incumbent governing party, the African National Congress (ANC), significantly declined in the election; the ANC remained the largest party but lost its majority in the National Assembly for the first time since the inaugural post-apartheid election in 1994. The centrist Democratic Alliance (DA) remained in second place with a slight increase. uMkhonto weSizwe (MK), a left-wing populist party founded six months prior to the election and led by former president Jacob Zuma, came in third place.

On 14 June 2024, the ANC, DA, Inkatha Freedom Party (IFP), and Patriotic Alliance (PA) agreed to form a coalition government, which they labelled a "Government of National Unity" (GNU). They re-elected the ANC's Cyril Ramaphosa as President of South Africa. Ramaphosa was inaugurated for a second term on 19 June.

Meanwhile, the coalition ballooned to include a total of ten political parties. Good joined shortly after the first sitting of Parliament, followed by the Pan Africanist Congress (PAC) on 19 June and the Freedom Front Plus (FF+) on 20 June. The United Democratic Movement (UDM) announced its entrance on 21 June, Rise Mzansi (RISE) on 22 June, and Al Jama-ah on 23 June. United Africans Transformation (UAT) was briefly an eleventh member, joining on 24 June but leaving after it was excluded from the cabinet on 30 June.

== History ==
In July 2026, it was reported that the number of private member's bills (those submitted directly by a Member of Parliament who is not part of the Cabinet) had significantly increased since the formation of the GNU. In the previous term of government, around 13% of all bills before Parliament were PMBs. During Ramaphosa's third cabinet - a coalition, that had risen to around 40%. Around half of all PMBs introduced came from members of the Democratic Alliance. In July 2026, there was a total of 48 bills before Parliament, 19 of which were PMBs. Those 19 bills constituted almost a third of all PMBs ever submitted to Parliament in post-democracy South Africa. Six of those bills proposed Constitutional amendments.

== Cabinet formation and reshuffles ==
President Ramaphosa announced his third cabinet on 30 June 2024. The Deputy President, Paul Mashatile, was sworn in on 3 July alongside the new ministers and deputy ministers.

On 3 December 2024, President Ramaphosa announced his first reshuffle of the cabinet, affecting four ministries: ministers Mmamoloko Kubayi and Thembi Simelane swapped portfolios and deputy ministers Judith Nemadzinga-Tshabalala and Phumzile Mgcina likewise swapped portfolios.

Ramaphosa dismissed Democratic Alliance Member of Parliament Andrew Whitfield as Deputy Minister of Trade, Industry and Competition on 25 June 2025 after the latter undertook an international visit without receiving the necessary permission from the president. This causes a dispute with the DA.

On 21 July 2025, Ramaphosa removed Dr Nobuhle Nkabane as Minister of Higher Education and Training and replaced her with the Deputy Minister of Higher Education and Training Buti Manamela, who was in turn succeeded by Nomusa Dube-Ncube as Deputy Minister.

On 12 November 2025, Ramaphosa announced another reshuffle of his executive, this time to remove Dion George as the Minister of Forestry, Fisheries and the Environment and replace him with Willie Aucamp. Alexandra Abrahams was also appointed to fill the position of Deputy Minister of Trade, Industry and Competition, which was left vacant after Ramaphosa fired Andrew Whitfield in June.

On 14 May 2026, Ramaphosa removed Sisisi Tolashe as Minister of Social Development, and has appointed the Minister in the Presidency for Women, Youth and Persons with Disabilities Sindisiwe Chikunga as acting minister until a successor is chosen.

On 30 June 2026, Ramaphosa announced changes to the DA's representation in the national executive. Willie Aucamp was appointed Minister of Agriculture, David Maynier as Minister of Forestry, Fisheries and the Environment, John Steenhuisen as Deputy Minister of Trade, Industry and Competition, Alexandra Abrahams as Deputy Minister of Electricity and Energy, Jack Bloom as Deputy Minister of Water and Sanitation, and Yusuf Cassim as Deputy Minister of Higher Education.

To fill the vacant Ministry of Social Development, Ramaphosa appointed Dina Pule as Minister of Social Development.

== Ministers ==
Party legend

- African National Congress (ANC)
- Democratic Alliance (DA)
- Inkatha Freedom Party (IFP)
- Patriotic Alliance (PA)
- Good (GOOD)
- Freedom Front Plus (FF+)
- Pan Africanist Congress of Azania (PAC)
- United Democratic Movement (UDM)
- Al Jama-ah

Post	Minister	Term (Note: Where incumbents first took office in the same portfolio before the swearing-in of the current cabinet, the earliest date is used, reflecting practical continuity. However, these terms are not legally continuous. The table considers a previous term only if the portfolio name matches exactly with that in the immediately preceding period.)		Party
President of South Africa	His Excellency Cyril Ramaphosa	2018	–	ANC
Deputy President of South Africa	His Excellency Paul Mashatile	2023	–	ANC
Minister in the Presidency	The Hon. Khumbudzo Ntshavheni MP	2023	–	ANC
Minister in the Presidency for Women, Youth and Persons with Disabilities	The Hon. Sindisiwe Chikunga MP	2024	–	ANC
Minister of Agriculture	The Hon. Willie Aucamp MP	2026	–	DA
Minister of Agriculture	The Hon. John Steenhuisen MP	2024	2026	DA
Minister of Basic Education	The Hon. Siviwe Gwarube MP	2024	–	DA
Minister of Communications and Digital Technologies	The Hon. Solly Malatsi MP	2024	–	DA
Minister of Cooperative Governance and Traditional Affairs	The Hon. Velenkosini Hlabisa MP	2024	–	IFP
Minister of Correctional Services	The Hon. Pieter Groenewald MP	2024	–	FF+
Minister of Defence and Military Veterans	The Hon. Angie Motshekga MP	2024	–	ANC
Minister of Electricity and Energy	The Hon. Kgosientsho Ramokgopa MP	2024	–	ANC
Minister of Employment and Labour	The Hon. Nomakhosazana Meth MP	2024	–	ANC
Minister of Forestry, Fisheries and the Environment	The Hon. David Maynier MPP	2026	–	DA
Minister of Forestry, Fisheries and the Environment	The Hon. Willie Aucamp MP	2025	2026	DA
Minister of Forestry, Fisheries and the Environment	The Hon. Dion George MP	2024	2025	DA
Minister of Finance	The Hon. Enoch Godongwana MP	2021	–	ANC
Minister of Health	The Hon. Aaron Motsoaledi MP	2024	–	ANC
Minister of Higher Education	The Hon. Buti Manamela MP	2025	–	ANC
Minister of Higher Education	The Hon. Nobuhle Nkabane MP	2024	2025	ANC
Minister of Home Affairs	The Hon. Leon Schreiber MP	2024	–	DA
Minister of Human Settlements	The Hon. Thembi Simelane MP	2024	–	ANC
Minister of Human Settlements	The Hon. Mmamoloko Kubayi MP	2021	2024	ANC
Minister of International Relations and Cooperation	The Hon. Ronald Lamola MP	2024	–	ANC
Minister of Justice and Constitutional Development	The Hon. Mmamoloko Kubayi MP	2024	–	ANC
Minister of Justice and Constitutional Development	The Hon. Thembi Simelane MP	2024	2024	ANC
Minister of Land Reform and Rural Development	The Hon. Mzwanele Nyhontso MP	2024	–	PAC
Minister of Mineral and Petroleum Resources	The Hon. Gwede Mantashe MP	2024	–	ANC
Minister of Planning, Monitoring and Evaluation	The Hon. Maropene Ramokgopa MP	2023	–	ANC
Minister of Police	The Hon. Senzo Mchunu MP	2024	–	ANC
Minister of Public Service and Administration	The Hon. Mzamo Buthelezi MP	2024	–	IFP
Minister of Public Works and Infrastructure	The Hon. Dean Macpherson MP	2024	–	DA
Minister of Science, Technology and Innovation	The Hon. Blade Nzimande MP	2024	–	ANC
Minister of Small Business Development	The Hon. Stella Ndabeni-Abrahams MP	2021	–	ANC
Minister of Social Development	The Hon. Dina Pule MP	2026	–	ANC
Minister of Social Development	The Hon. Sindisiwe Chikunga MP (Acting)	2026	2026	ANC
Minister of Social Development	The Hon. Sisisi Tolashe MP	2024	2026	ANC
Minister of Sports, Arts and Culture	The Hon. Gayton McKenzie MP	2024	–	PA
Minister of Tourism	The Hon. Patricia de Lille MP	2023	–	GOOD
Minister of Trade, Industry and Competition	The Hon. Parks Tau MP	2024	–	ANC
Minister of Transport	The Hon. Barbara Creecy MP	2024	–	ANC
Minister of Water and Sanitation	The Hon. Pemmy Majodina MP	2024	–	ANC

== Deputy ministers ==
Post	Deputy Minister	Term		Party
Deputy Minister of Agriculture	The Hon. Rosemary Nokuzola Capa MP	2024	–	ANC
Deputy Minister of Land Reform and Rural Development	The Hon. Stanley Mathabatha MP	2024	–	ANC
Deputy Minister of Basic Education	The Hon. Reginah Mhaule MP	2019	–	ANC
Deputy Minister of Communications and Digital Technologies	The Hon. Mondli Gungubele MP	2024	–	ANC
Deputy Ministers of Cooperative Governance and Traditional Affairs	The Hon. Dickson Masemola MP	2024	–	ANC
Deputy Ministers of Cooperative Governance and Traditional Affairs	The Hon. Zolile Burns‐Ncamashe MP	2023	–	ANC
Deputy Minister of Correctional Services	The Hon. Lindiwe Ntshalintshali MP	2024	–	ANC
Deputy Ministers of Defence and Military Veterans	The Hon. Bantu Holomisa MP	2024	–	UDM
Deputy Ministers of Defence and Military Veterans	The Hon. Richard Mkhungo MP	2024	–	ANC
Deputy Minister of Electricity and Energy	The Hon. Alexandra Abrahams MP	2026	–	DA
Deputy Minister of Electricity and Energy	The Hon. Samantha Graham MP	2024	2026	DA
Deputy Ministers of Employment and Labour	The Hon. Jomo Sibiya MP	2024	–	ANC
Deputy Ministers of Employment and Labour	The Hon. Judith Tshabalala MP	2024	–	ANC
Deputy Ministers of Employment and Labour	The Hon. Phumzile Mgcina MP	2024	2024	ANC
Deputy Ministers of Finance	The Hon. David Masondo MP	2019	–	ANC
Deputy Ministers of Finance	The Hon. Ashor Sarupen MP	2024	–	DA
Deputy Ministers of Forestry, Fisheries and the Environment	The Hon. Narend Singh MP	2024	–	IFP
Deputy Ministers of Forestry, Fisheries and the Environment	The Hon. Bernice Swarts MP	2024	–	ANC
Deputy Minister of Health	The Hon. Joe Phaahla MP	2024	–	ANC
Deputy Ministers of Higher Education	The Hon. Yusuf Cassim MP	2026	–	DA
Deputy Ministers of Higher Education	The Hon. Nomusa Dube-Ncube MP	2025	–	ANC
Deputy Ministers of Higher Education	The Hon. Mimmy Gondwe MP	2025	2026	DA
Deputy Ministers of Higher Education	The Hon. Buti Manamela MP	2024	2025	ANC
Deputy Minister of Home Affairs	The Hon. Njabulo Nzuza MP	2019	–	ANC
Deputy Minister of Human Settlements	The Hon. Tandi Mahambehlala MP	2024	–	ANC
Deputy Ministers of International Relations and Cooperation	The Hon. Alvin Botes MP	2019	–	ANC
Deputy Ministers of International Relations and Cooperation	The Hon. Thandi Moraka MP	2024	–	ANC
Deputy Minister of Justice and Constitutional Development	The Hon. Andries Nel MP	2024	–	ANC
Deputy Minister of Mineral and Petroleum Resources	The Hon. Phumzile Mgcina MP	2024	–	ANC
Deputy Minister of Mineral and Petroleum Resources	The Hon. Judith Tshabalala MP	2024	2024	ANC
Deputy Minister of Planning, Monitoring and Evaluation	The Hon. Seiso Mohai MP	2024	–	ANC
Deputy Ministers of Police	The Hon. Polly Boshielo MP	2024	–	ANC
Deputy Ministers of Police	The Hon. Cassel Mathale MP	2019	–	ANC
Deputy Ministers in the Presidency	The Hon. Nonceba Mhlauli MP	2024	–	ANC
Deputy Ministers in the Presidency	The Hon. Kenneth Morolong MP	2023	–	ANC
Deputy Minister of Public Service and Administration	The Hon. Pinky Kekana MP	2024	–	ANC
Deputy Minister of Public Works and Infrastructure	The Hon. Sihle Zikalala MP	2024	–	ANC
Deputy Minister of Science, Technology and Innovation	The Hon. Nomalungelo Gina MP	2024	–	ANC
Deputy Minister of Small Business Development	The Hon. Jane Sithole MP	2024	–	DA
Deputy Minister of Social Development	The Hon. Ganief Hendricks MP	2024	–	ALJ
Deputy Minister of Sport, Arts and Culture	The Hon. Peace Mabe MP	2024	–	ANC
Deputy Minister of Tourism	The Hon. Maggie Sotyu MP	2024	–	ANC
Deputy Ministers of Trade, Industry and Competition	The Hon. Zuko Godlimpi MP	2024	–	ANC
Deputy Ministers of Trade, Industry and Competition	The Hon. John Steenhuisen MP	2026	–	DA
Deputy Ministers of Trade, Industry and Competition	The Hon. Alexandra Abrahams MP	2025	2026	DA
Deputy Ministers of Trade, Industry and Competition	The Hon. Andrew Whitfield	2024	2025	DA
Deputy Minister of Transport	The Hon. Mkhuleko Hlengwa MP	2024	–	IFP
Deputy Ministers of Water and Sanitation	The Hon. David Mahlobo MP	2024	–	ANC
Deputy Ministers of Water and Sanitation	The Hon. Jack Bloom MPL	2026	–	DA
Deputy Ministers of Water and Sanitation	The Hon. Sello Seitlholo MP	2024	2026	DA
Deputy Minister of Women, Youth and Persons with Disabilities	The Hon. Steve Letsike MP	2024	–	ANC

== See also ==
- Multi-Party Charter
- Cabinet of South Africa
- 2024 South African government formation
- List of National Assembly members of the 28th Parliament of South Africa
