= Astron Energy Refinery =

Oil refinery in Cape Town, South Africa

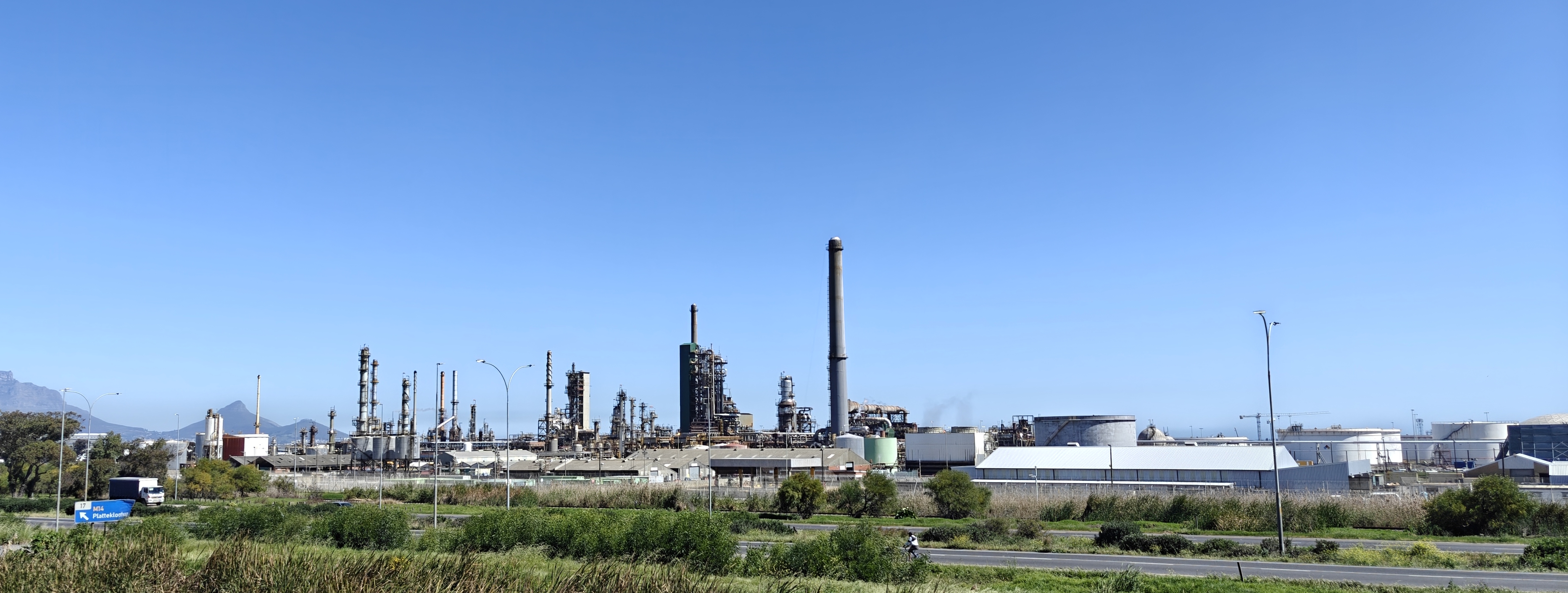
- The Astron Energy Refinery in Milnerton, Cape Town

- Location in Cape Town
- Location: Milnerton Rural, Cape Town, Western Cape, South Africa; 33.8351501°S 18.5254745°E

Refinery details
- Operator: Astron Energy
- Owner: Astron Energy
- Opened: 1966; 60 years ago
- Capacity: 100,000 bbl/d (16,000 m^{3}/d)
- Complexity index: 6.4
- No. of employees: 500 (2026)
- Website: astronenergy.co.za/about-us/refinery

The Astron Energy Refinery, also referred to as the Astron Refinery is a major oil refinery located in Cape Town, South Africa. It is owned and operated by South African petroleum company Astron Energy, which is the country's second-largest consumer gas retailer by number of outlets.

The site is situated on a plot of just over 208 hectares alongside the N7 freeway, in Milnerton Rural, in a part of Cape Town zoned for industrial and commercial buildings.

As of 2026, the refinery is one of two active crude oil refineries in South Africa, and the only one in the Western Cape. It has a crude oil processing capacity of 100,000 barrels per day.

== History ==
The refinery was commissioned in 1966, and constructed by US oil and gas company Caltex. It was the first major oil refinery built in the Western Cape, and formed part of Caltex's expansion of its local refining operations.

The Caltex Refinery was upgraded in 1970, with the addition of its first vacuum distillation unit, while a second crude distillation unit and associated processing facilities were added as part of the construction of the North Refinery, commissioned in 1978.

In 1996, US oil and gas company Chevron acquired Texaco's interest in Caltex, making Chevron the sole owner of the refinery, which continued to operate under the Caltex brand.

In 2016, Chevron announced it would exit the South African and Botswanan downstream oil markets. A sale agreement was reached in March 2017.

Swiss commodity trading and mining company Glencore announced an agreement with Off The Shelf Investments Fifty Six (OTS), under which OTS would acquire a 75% shareholding in Chevron SA from Chevron, with Glencore acting as the technical and financial partner. The transaction included the Caltex Refinery, a lubricants plant in Durban, storage and distribution facilities, and the Caltex-branded gas station network.

The acquisition was completed in September 2018, and Chevron SA was subsequently renamed Astron Energy. The latter retained the right to operate the Caltex brand in South Africa and Botswana under a licensing agreement with Chevron, while forecourts were rebranded to Astron Energy over multiple years.

In 2019, following regulatory approval, Glencore converted its financing of OTS's acquisition into a 75% controlling interest in Astron Energy. The remaining ownership was held by OTS and its employees. The South African Competition Tribunal's approval of the transaction required, among other commitments, substantial investment in the Astron Energy Refinery.

== Operations ==
As of 2026, the Astron Refinery has a crude oil processing capacity of 100,000 barrels. It is one of two crude oil refineries in South Africa, and the only one in the Western Cape, serving as a major source of refined petroleum products for the province.

== See also ==
- Petroleum industry in South Africa
