= Sihle Ngubane =

South African politician and businessman

The Honourable Sihle Ngubane MP

Member of the National Assembly
- Incumbent
- Assumed office 25 June 2024

Personal details
- Born: Joel Sihle Ngubane; 13 May 1972 (age 54)
- Party: MK Party
- Spouse: Mmamoloko Kubayi (m. 2017; div. 2021)

Joel Sihle Ngubane (born 13 May 1972) is a South African politician and businessman who has represented the Umkhonto weSizwe Party (MK) in the National Assembly since June 2024. He was elected to his seat in the May 2024 general election, ranked tenth on MK's national party list. He is a former secretary-general and chief whip of the party.

== Personal life ==
Between 2017 and 2021, Ngubane was married to Mmamoloko Kubayi, a government minister and African National Congress leader. They had a child together in 2017. During their marriage, media questioned the propriety of public contracts awarded to Ngubane's company.
