= Total South Africa =

South African subsidiary of the French energy company TotalEnergies

- TotalEnergies logo
- Formerly: Total Oil Products (Pty) Ltd
- Type: Private
- Industry: Oil and Gas
- Founded: December 11, 1954; 71 years ago in Pretoria, South Africa
- Headquarters: Johannesburg, South Africa
- Number of locations: 547 (2025)
- Area served: South Africa
- Key people: Sonja de Bruyn (Chairperson); Olagoke Aluko (CEO)
- Products: Fuels; Lubricants; Bitumen; Agrochemicals; Aviation fuel Marine fuel
- Parent: TotalEnergies
- Website: www.totalenergies.co.za

TotalEnergies Marketing South Africa (Pty) Ltd (commonly simply referred to in South Africa as Total) is an energy and chemical company operating across South Africa's fuel, lubricants, and renewable energy markets. Headquartered in Johannesburg, it is the South African affiliate of the French multinational TotalEnergies SE, one of the world's largest integrated energy companies.

The company manages a network of over 540 petrol stations nationwide, supplies fuel and aviation products to commercial sectors, and holds a 36.4% stake in the Natref refinery.

In addition to petroleum operations, it is actively expanding into solar and wind energy projects, and plays a growing role in South Africa's transition toward low-carbon power solutions. In December 2023, the company commenced construction of a 140 MW wind farm and a 120 MW solar plant in the Northern Cape province, with operations expected to begin by the end of 2026.

== History ==
TotalEnergies made its South African debut on 11 December 1954, when Total Oil Products (Pty) Ltd was registered in Pretoria, hosting its inaugural board meeting three days later. By 1955, the company had already set up its first fuel terminals and service stations across Johannesburg, Pretoria, Durban, Roodepoort, and Benoni.

In 1967, the company rebranded as Total South Africa (Pty) Ltd, acquiring a 30% stake in the Natref refinery and forming Total Exploration South Africa (TESA), marking its shift from distribution to a fully integrated energy player. Today the company is known as TotalEnergies Marketing South Africa (PTY) Ltd, with 50.1% ownership by TotalEnergies SE (France) and 49.9% by South African stakeholders (TOSACO), at Level 1 B-BBEE status.

== Operations ==
Serving over 547 service stations nationwide, TotalEnergies in South Africa caters to retail, commercial, industrial, agricultural, and aviation sectors, offering jet fuel, LPG, kerosene, lubricants, and bitumen, while also operating wholly owned subsidiaries in Namibia and Eswatini.

Total is a member of the Fuels Industry Association of South Africa (FIASA), and was one of its founding members when the organisation launched in 1994.

== Products and services ==
- Fuels
- Lubricants
- Agrochemicals
- Food grade lubricants
- Bitumen and bitumen emulsions
- Illuminating paraffin
- Aviation fuel
- Marine fuel

== Renewable Energy Initiatives ==
TotalEnergies led development of the 86 MW Prieska Solar Power Station, which came online in 2016 and powers approximately 75,000 South African homes via a long-term PPA with Eskom. In November 2023, the company signed Corporate PPAs totaling 260 MW of renewable capacity, including a 120 MW solar and 140 MW wind project, for Sasol and Air Liquide, with annual output of roughly 850 GWh.

The company has also begun constructing a 216 MW solar plant with 500 MWh battery storage, expected online in 2025, that will dispatch 75 MW of reliable power daily from 5 a.m. to 9:30 p.m. under South Africa's Renewable Energy Independent Power Producer Procurement Programme.

== Controversies & Criticisms ==
TotalEnergies encountered official scrutiny when South Africa's Advertising Regulatory Board (ARB) ruled that its SANParks campaign, which touted sustainable development, was misleading, deeming it greenwashing given the company's continued fossil fuel projects. The company is appealing the decision, emphasising its expected shift toward low-carbon energy.

Meanwhile, Total's decision to withdraw from the Brulpadda and Luiperd offshore gas projects, despite holding a 45% stake and investing around $400 million, sparked criticism from policymakers concerned about national gas shortages.

Activists and small-scale fisherman have voiced concerns over a 2022 production license application to develop gas fields off Port Nolloth–Hondeklip Bay, arguing that it threatens marine ecosystems and benefits extraction over community needs.

== See also ==
- Petroleum industry in South Africa
- List of petroleum companies
- TotalEnergies
- Energy in South Africa
- Renewable energy in South Africa
