= PetroSA =

South African national oil company

The Petroleum, Oil and Gas Corporation of South Africa SOC Ltd
- Trade name: PetroSA
- Type: Public
- Industry: Oil and gas
- Founded: 1965; 61 years ago
- Headquarters: Cape Town, South Africa
- Area served: South Africa
- Key people: Unathi Figlan (Chairperson); Xolile Sizani (CEO)
- Products: Petroleum; Natural gas Petroleum products
- Revenue: ▲ R13.7 billion (2020)
- Operating income: ▼ R334 million (2020)
- Net income: ▼ -R5.57 billion (2020)
- Total assets: ▼ R14.39 billion (2020)
- Total equity: ▼ -R4.46 billion (2020)
- Owner: The Government of South Africa
- Number of employees: 1,486 (2020)
- Parent: The Central Energy Fund
- Subsidiaries: PetroSA Ghana Limited (PGL); PetroSA Europe B.V.
- Website: petrosa.co.za

PetroSA, officially the Petroleum, Oil and Gas Corporation of South Africa, is the national oil and gas company (NOC) of South Africa. Founded in 1965 and headquartered in Cape Town, PetroSA is a state-owned entity (SOE).

Its main activities are the extraction of natural gas from offshore fields about 89 km from Mossel Bay, the production of synthetic fuels from this gas through a gas to liquids (GTL) process, and the extraction of crude oil from oil fields off the South Coast of South Africa.

The GTL Refinery is located in Mossel Bay. Its capacity is about 45 000 bpd and processes both the gas and condensate to produce liquid fuels and chemicals. The company is also involved in the exploration for and development of new sources of oil and gas.

PetroSA is a member of the Fuels Industry Association of South Africa (FIASA), having joined in 2002.

== History ==
PetroSA was formed in January 2002 from the merger of three previous entities: Mossgas (Pty) Limited, Soekor (Pty) Limited, and parts of the Strategic Fuel Fund Association.

Soekor was divided into parts to provide staff for PetroSA and also for the Petroleum Agency of South Africa, otherwise known as PASA.

Some of the key milestones leading up to this historic merger were:

- 1965 - Following the establishment of Soekor, the first land search for oil commences in Beaufort West, Western Cape. Small accumulations of oil are found, but they are non-commercial.
- 1969 - First offshore well drilled by Superior Group. Natural gas deposits are also discovered in the continental shelf complex off the Southern Cape coast.
- 1970 - Soekor commences offshore drilling in a joint venture with Rand Mines and US Natural Resources.
- 1973 - Soekor drills its own first offshore well.
- 1978 - Soekor terminates its land search for oil.
- 2002 - President Thabo Mbeki launches PetroSA, the Petroleum Oil and Gas Corporation of the Republic of South Africa.

=== Recent events ===
- 2017 - PetroSA signed $400m deal with Russian exploration company Rosgeo.
- 2018 – Energy Minister of South Africa Jeff Radebe rejected PetroSA's proposal to purchase 23 million barrels of oil from Kase Lawal for $1.52 billion over a 5-year period, deeming the deal too risky.
- 2020 – Mossel Bay gas-to-liquid (GTL) refinery was closed in December when it ran out of offshore gas resources.
- 2023 – PetroSA signed a deal in December with Gazprombank for R3.7 billion to invest into the Mossel Bay Refinery.
- 2024 – In July, TotalEnergies withdrew from Block11B/12B as well as exited from Block5/6/7 offshore explorations.
- 2025 – In June, PetroSA, Ghana National Petroleum Corporation (GNPC), Explorco, Tullow Oil Plc and Kosmos Energy Ltd., signed a $2 billion MoU with the Government of Ghana to extend two production licenses until 2040.

== Soekor ==
Soekor Pty Ltd. (from Suidelike Olie Eksplorasie Korporasie; 'Southern Oil Exploration Corporation') was South Africa's national oil company until 2002, when it was merged with Mossgas Pty Ltd to form PetroSA. Soekor was the operator and developer of the first oilfield development in South Africa, the Oribi field discovered in 1990. Soekor owned 80% of the field's exploration licensing.

== Petroleum Agency of South Africa ==
Petroleum Agency of South Africa (PASA) is the state-regulator in the field of on-shore and off-shore oil and gas exploration. In June 2018 PASA imposed temporary licensing restrictions in order to reform the country's oil and gas exploration licensing system.

== Restructuring ==
In 2020, Cabinet approved for PetroSA to be merged with the Strategic Fuel Fund (SFF) and the South African Gas Development Company SOC Limited (iGas) to form a new national petroleum company.

== Controversy ==
The company was implicated in a corruption scandal, dubbed "Oilgate" by the media, when it was reported that it had transferred R11 million to the ruling African National Congress in the run-up to the 2004 elections.

== Finances ==
For the year 2020, a loss of R5.6 billion was recognised, with total liabilities exceeding total assets by R4.5 billion.

== Leadership ==
PetroSA leadership
Chairman		Chief executive officer	
Term	Name	Term	Name
2002-2010	Popo Molefe	2002-2003	Mpumelelo Tshume
2011-2012	Benny Mokaba	2004-2010	Sipho Mkhize
2013-2014	Szwe Mncwango	2011	Yekani Tenza
2015	Gillian Nonhlanhe Jiyane	01 Mar 2012-2015	Nosizwe Nokwe-Macamo
2016	Bhekabantu Wilfred Ngubane	2016	Mapula Modipa
2017-2018	Nhlanhla Gumede	2017-2018	Kholly Zono
2019–Present	Frans Baleni	2018-2019	Bongani Sayidini
		2020–2022	Pragasen Naidoo
2021 - Present	Nkululeko Poya	2022 - Present	Sandisiwe Ncemane

== See also ==
- Petroleum industry in South Africa
