= Shell South Africa =

Southern African oil and gas subsidiary

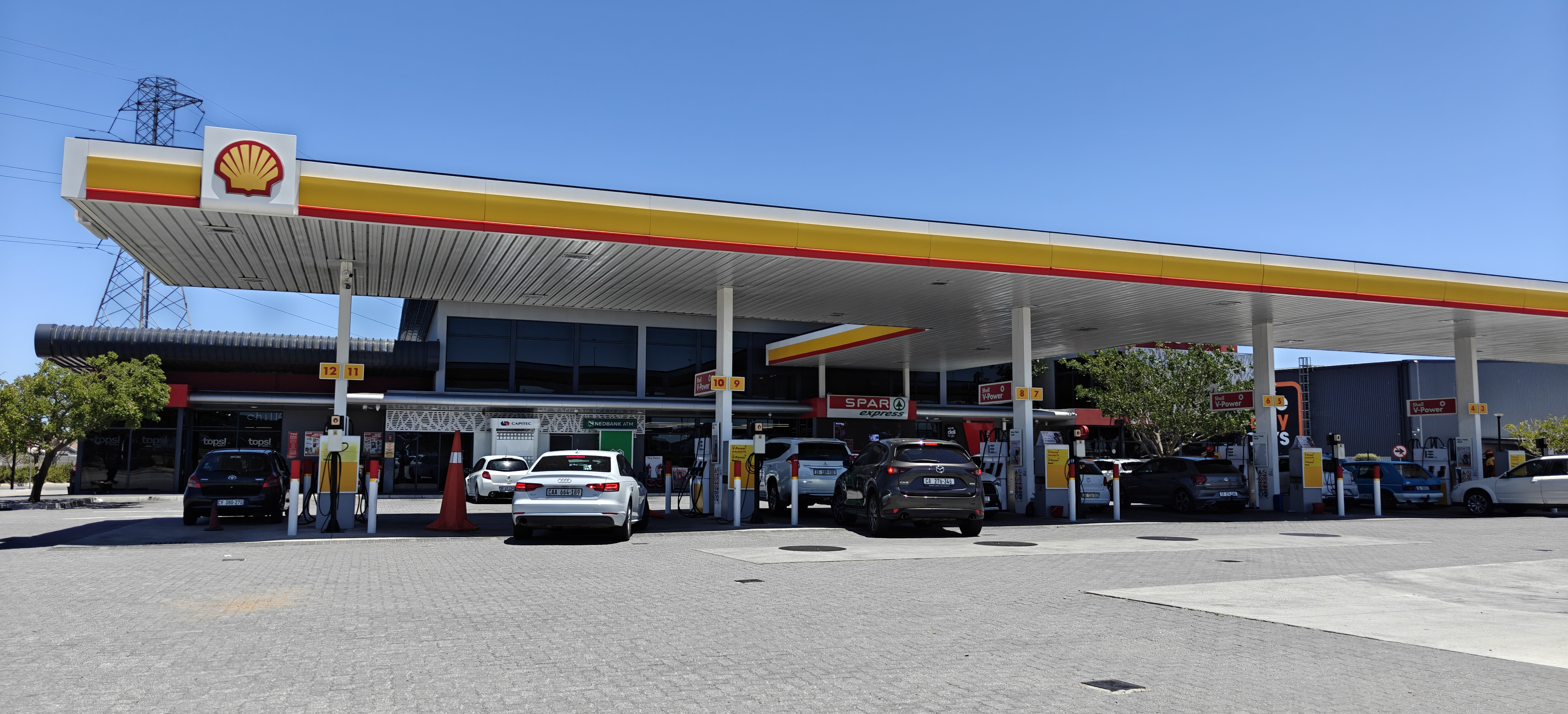
- Shell gas station in Brackenfell, Western Cape
- Type: Subsidiary
- Industry: Petroleum
- Founded: 1902; 124 years ago
- Headquarters: Sandton, Gauteng, South Africa
- Number of locations: 591 (2025)
- Area served: South Africa
- Products: Gasoline; Lubricants
- Brands: V Power; V+ Rewards
- Parent: Shell plc
- Divisions: Shell Lubricant Solutions
- Website: shell.co.za

Shell South Africa is a South African petroleum company, headquartered in Sandton, Gauteng. Founded in 1902, the company is a subsidiary of Shell plc, and operates 591 gas stations across South Africa, as of 2025.

In mid-2026, it was announced that Abu Dhabi National Oil Company (ADNOC) would wholly acquire Shell SA, with the deal expected to close in 2027.

== History ==
Shell South Africa was founded in 1902, focusing on paraffin and kerosene.

In 1998, Shell embarked on a refinery processing deal with Tepco, a company owned by the Thebe Investment Corporation. Shell and Tepco subsequently formed an aviation and commercial fuels joint venture in 2001.

In 2002, Thebe acquired a 25% shareholding in Shell's downstream sales and marketing business, Shell South Africa Marketing. Further investment by Thebe followed, when in 2008, the company acquired 25% of Shell South Africa Refining. This was later increased to 28%.

In January 2015, Shell South Africa and Thebe Investment Corporation announced that Shell South Africa Marketing and Shell South Refining would merge to form Shell Downstream SA (SDSA). As part of the new structure, Thebe would acquire additional equity, in order to bring its shareholding in the merged entity to 28%.

In May 2024, Shell and BP sold their 50-50 shareholding in the SAPREF refinery (once the largest in SA by output) to the South African Government-owned Central Energy Fund (CEF). As part of the deal, Shell and BP would jointly pay CEF a total of R286 million for operational costs for the refinery for the first year post-sale. The sale included assets related to SAPREF, such as crude and finished product tanks, process units, the Single Buoy Mooring for crude imports, and pipelines to and from SAPREF to the Island View terminal.

The transaction value of the sale was R1, and Shell and BP would transfer all responsibility for environmental cleanup to the South African Government.

In the same month, Shell announced its intention to exit the South African downstream petroleum market. Parent company Royal Dutch Shell will entirely divest its shareholding in Shell Downstream SA (SDSA), which includes the company's retail, transport, and refining operations in SA.

It was reported that Sasol, Abu Dhabi National Oil Company, and Aramco were considering bids for Shell's South African downstream assets, which were worth around R14.7 billion.

In April 2025, potential bidders were reported to be Gunvor and Abu Dhabi National Oil Company, and that Puma and Sasol were not considering bids. The value of the deal was approximately R18.8 billion.

In June 2026, it was reported that a deal with Gunvor did not finalize for the purchase of Shell South Africa, and that ADNOC Distribution emerged as the preferred bidder. Furthermore, it was reported that the Shell SA-ADNOC deal was nearing closing, and was valued at around R16.3 billion.

In July 2026, it was confirmed that Abu Dhabi National Oil Company would indeed be acquiring Shell SA's assets. The R16 billion deal included Shell's 580 gas stations, as well as its wholesale fuel, aviation, and lubricants operations. ADNOC said the deal was expected to close in 2027, subject to regulatory conditions. Furthermore, the company said it had signed a long-term licensing agreement to continue using the Shell brand for its SA gas stations and lubricants.

ADNOC also confirmed that a 28% stake would be sold to a local empowerment partner and Employee Stock Option Plan (ESOP) after completion of the deal. It said this would be done with a focus on energy security, job creation, and inclusive economic participation priorities through the local partner. ADNOC's CEO said the deal marked a significant milestone in the company's international growth strategy, and reflects confidence in South Africa as a high-potential, well-regulated fuel retail sector.

== Operations ==
As of 2025, Shell South Africa operates 591 gas stations throughout SA, making it the market's third-largest consumer gas retailer by number of locations.

The company has a partnership with major South African supermarket chain SPAR, through which the latter's SPAR Express convenience stores are co-located with many Shell forecourts.

A similar partnership exists between Shell and South African coffeehouse chain Vida, through the co-developed Torrador brand.

Shell South Africa is a member of the Fuels Industry Association of South Africa, along with its major competitors, and was a founding member of the association in 1994.

== Controversy ==
In 2024, nonprofit media outlet Open Secrets published a report detailing how Shell South Africa had played a part in propping up the South African economy during the years of apartheid's national government-driven racial segregation. The company had provided fuel to the apartheid police and armed forces - a vital resource at the time. Despite anti-apartheid protests at Shell gas stations in the United States, United Kingdom, and the Netherlands, Shell continued to invest in the South African economy during the apartheid era.

Along with other major oil companies BP, Caltex, Mobil, and Total, Shell ignored international sanctions on South Africa, and was involved in covert operations orchestrated in part by the Strategic Fuel Fund. Taking place from the 1980s up to 1992, the companies did business with the apartheid government, camouflaging oil shipments to South Africa.

== See also ==
- Petroleum industry in South Africa
- Royal Dutch Shell
