= Engen Petroleum =

South African oil company

Engen Petroleum Limited

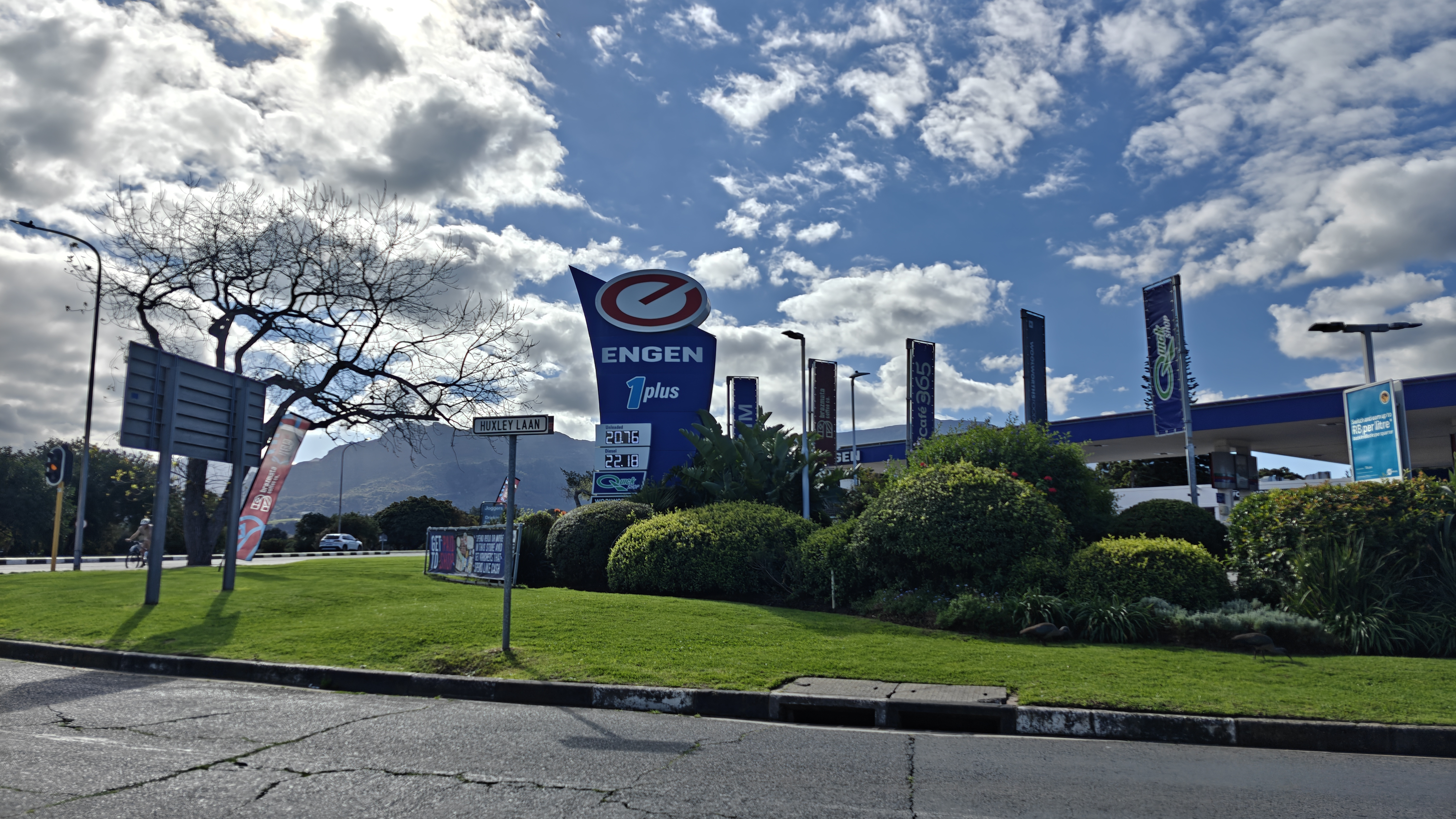
- Engen gas station in Cape Town
- Type: Private company
- Industry: Petroleum
- Predecessor: Mobil South Africa Engen Petroleum
- Founded: 1881; 145 years ago
- Headquarters: Cape Town, South Africa
- Number of locations: 1,040 (2024)
- Area served: Sub-Saharan Africa; Indian Ocean Islands
- Key people: Seelan Naidoo (Managing Director and CEO); Ahmad Adly Alias (Chairman)
- Products: Fuels; Lubricants; Petrochemicals
- Revenue: R156 billion (2022)
- Net income: R2.4 billion (2022)
- Total assets: R52 billion (2022)
- Number of employees: 2,523 (2022)
- Parent: Vivo Energy (74%); PHEMBANI (21%)
- Website: engen.co.za

Engen (officially Engen Petroleum) is a South African oil company, focusing on the downstream refined petroleum products market and related businesses.

Headquartered in Cape Town, Engen has around a quarter of the South African petroleum retail market share, operating over 1,000 gas stations across the country.

The company is present in over 20 countries, and exports products to over 30 more - mostly across Africa and the Indian Ocean Islands.

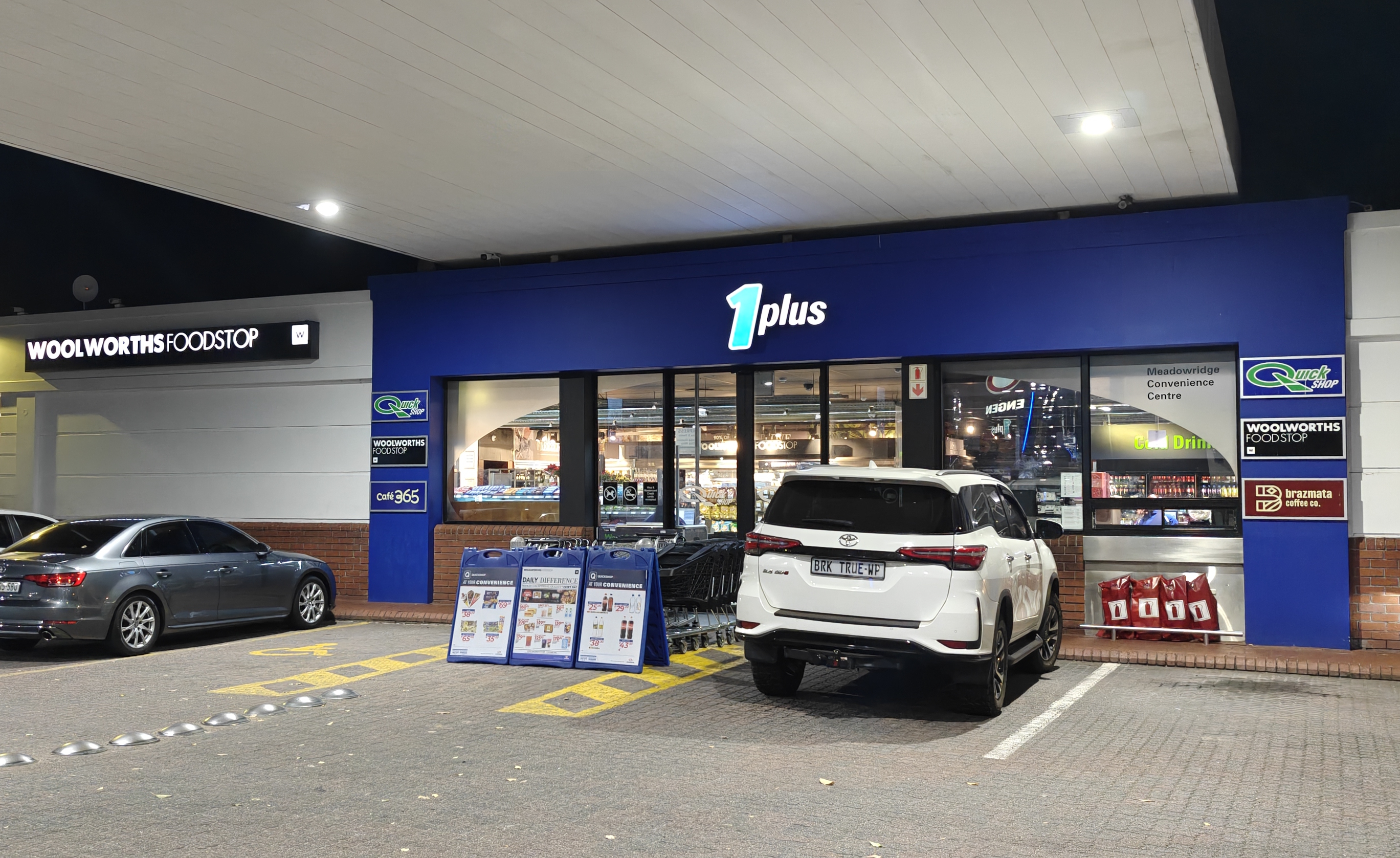
Woolworths Foodstop at an Engen gas station in Cape Town

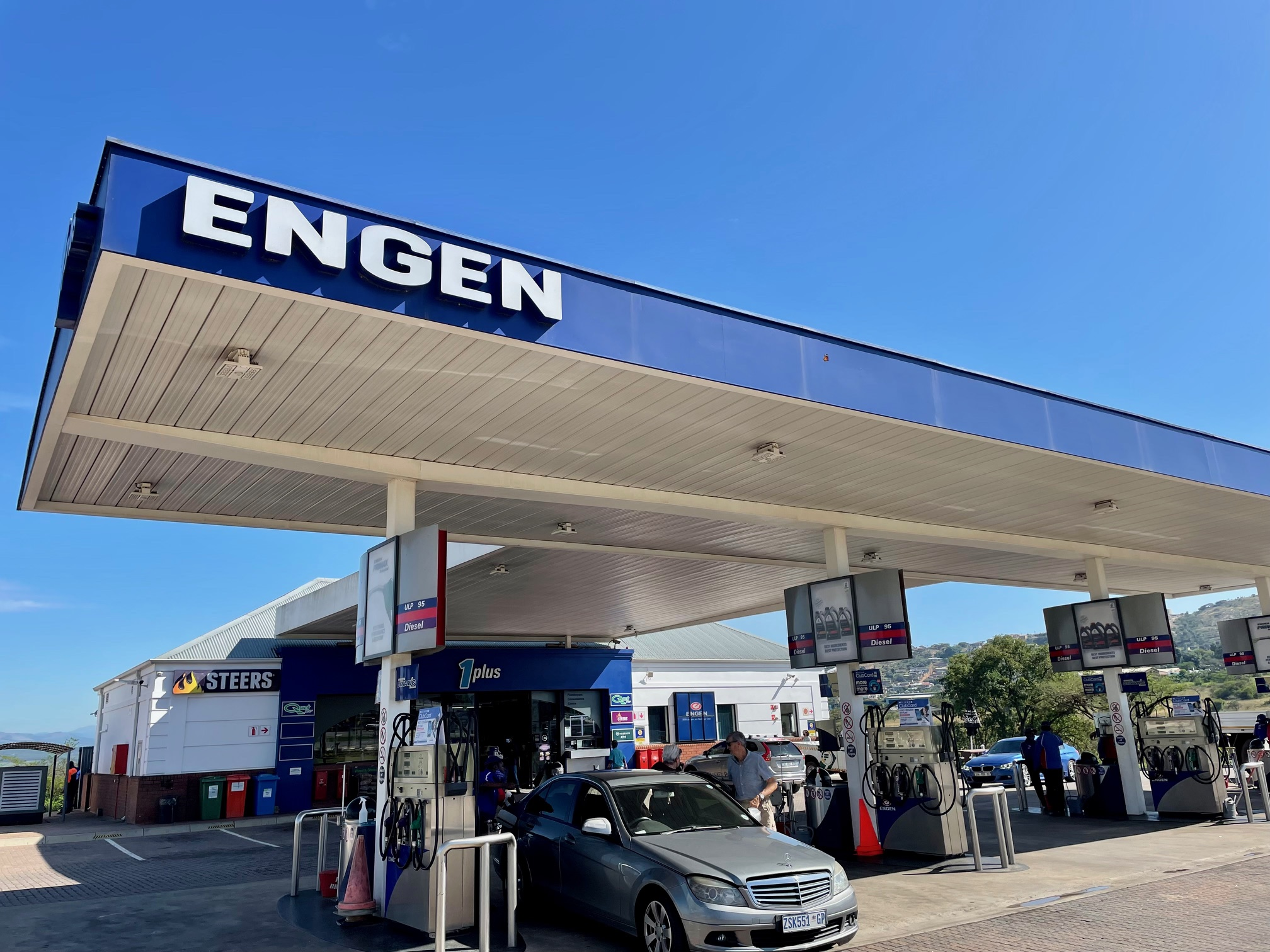
An Engen service station in South Africa

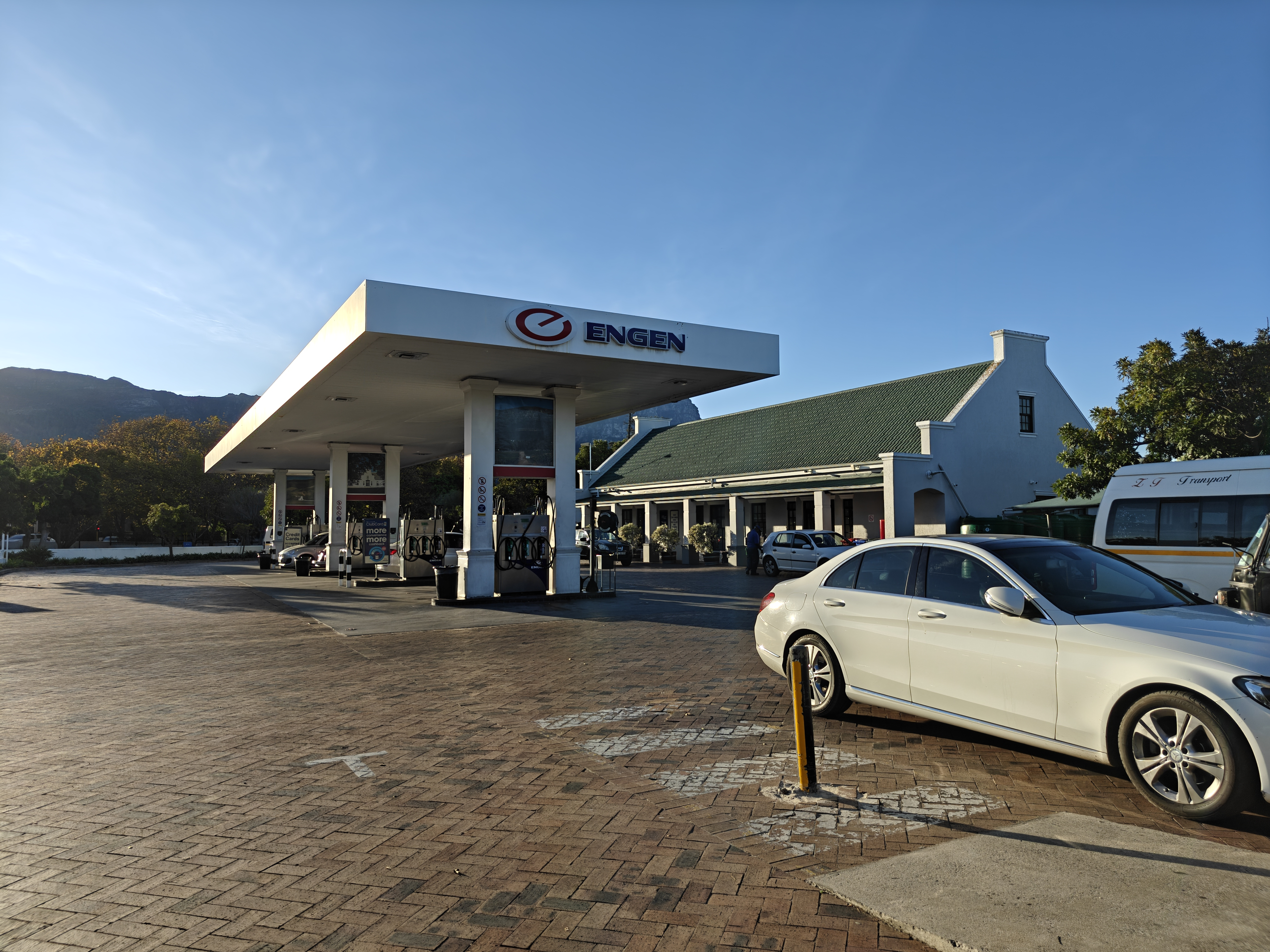
Engen gas station in Cape Town

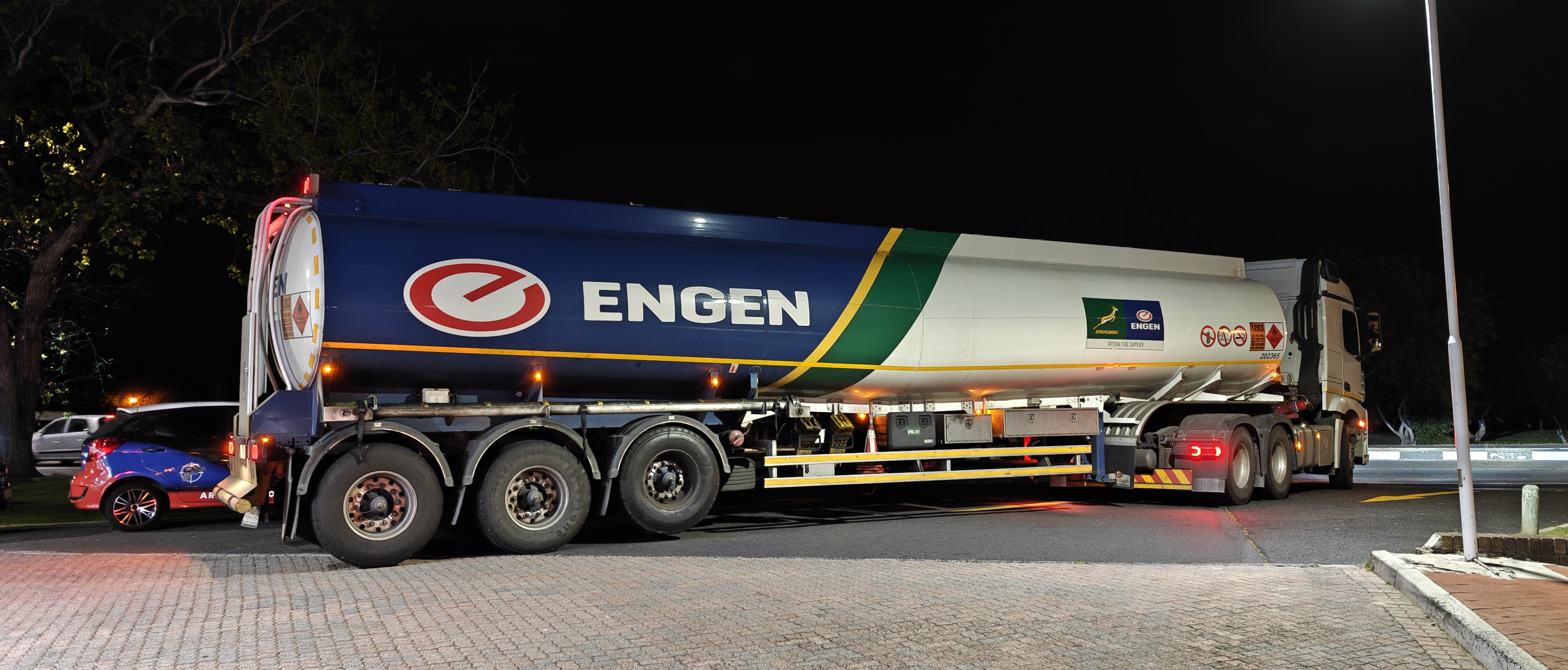
Engen gas truck in Meadowridge, Cape Town, after refueling the station at night

== History ==
Engen was founded in Durban in 1881, as The Natal Oil Company. Initially, the company focused on producing kerosene and other petroleum products, and its founding was in response to the growing demand for oil and fuel products, driven by industrialization and urbanization in South Africa.

Engen began establishing its gas station network across South Africa during the 1960s, as the demand for fuel increased, along with an increase in vehicle ownership in South Africa, and the expansion of its national road network.

The company branched out into the production of diesel and aviation fuel in the 1970s, and was producing fuel for the South African and export markets. The Engen Refinery was established in Durban in 1971.

The company began trading under the Engen name in 1990. Engen Limited, was listed on the Johannesburg Stock Exchange in 1992.

In 1995, Engen launched its Customer Service Excellence program, aimed at enhancing the customer experience at its gas stations.

Between 1996 and 2000, Engen expanded considerably, establishing affiliates in Kenya, Tanzania, Zimbabwe, Zambia, Ghana, Burundi, Uganda, and Mozambique.

Broad-Based Black Economic Empowerment (BBBEE) corporation PHEMBANI acquired a 20% stake in Engen in 1999.

In 2000, Engen partnered with major South African retail company Woolworths to pilot a new Woolworths Foodstop convenience store format at Engen gas stations. In 2003, the partnership officially launched to the public.

In the early 2000s, Engen began investing in renewable energy projects and exploring alternative fuels to diversify its energy portfolio.

In 2007, Engen bought a facility in the Democratic Republic of the Congo (DRC), and did the same in 2008 in Gabon, Guinea Bissau, Burundi, and Rwanda.

In 2019, Engen reported around 150 million customer visits at its South African gas stations for the year.

In May 2024, Engen announced that privately-owned British petroleum company Vivo Energy was purchasing the 74% shareholding in Engen that had previously (for 25 years) been held by Malaysian SOE Petronas. The Phembani Group retained its 21% shareholding in Engen. The deal followed the parties working, since the transaction was announced in February 2023, to secure regulatory approvals across all of Engen's seven markets of operation. These were secured with conditions.

In September 2024 at the SIBA restaurant in Cape Town, Engen launched Brazmata, its own coffee brand. Using arabica beans sourced from regions including Tanzania, Brazil, and Guatemala, Brazmata was rolled out at Engen's Café 365 outlets across South Africa. Customers are able to purchase the coffee in-store, or buy beans to take home. Engen is headquartered in Cape Town, where there is a thriving local coffee culture.

In September 2026, it was announced that the 101st Woolworths Foodstop convenience store had opened, in collaboration with Engen.

== Operations ==
The company is active in South Africa, Zimbabwe, Botswana, Namibia, Eswatini, Mauritius, Lesotho and the Democratic Republic of the Congo. The company's Botswana business is listed on the Botswana Stock Exchange and is a constituent of the BSE Domestic Company Index.

As with all other major petroleum companies in South Africa, Engen is regulated by the National Energy Regulator of South Africa (NERSA), which is the regulatory authority for the country's energy sector. Engen is a member of the Fuels Industry Association of South Africa (FIASA), and was one of its founding members when the organization launched in 1994.

In 2017, shareholder PHEMBANI reported that Engen held 25% of the South African petroleum market share, and had a crude oil refining capacity of 135,000 barrels per day (bpd).

=== Gas stations ===
Engen operates approximately 1,300 service stations in sub-Saharan Africa and Indian Ocean Islands. A number of Engen's service stations are operated on a franchise basis.

Engen is the largest gas station operator in South Africa, with 1,040 outlets. This is considerably ahead of Shell, which has 850, Astron Energy (formerly Caltex), which has 591, Total Energies with 547, BP with 500, and Sasol, with 354.

At many of its South African gas stations, Engen hosts partner businesses for customer convenience. These include Woolworths Foodstops, Steers, Debonairs, Krispy Kreme, Wimpy, and Engen's own Brazmata (coffee), Cafe365 (pastries), and Quickshop (convenience store) outlets.

Engen has two main loyalty partners for its gas stations. Customers can earn eBucks (loyalty points from major South African bank FNB), as well as ClubCard points (loyalty points from South African healthcare and personal care retailer Clicks).

The company allows customers to purchase gas by loading credit or debit cards, as well as loyalty cards, into its Engen 1app mobile app.

== Engen Oil Centers ==
Engen operates Engen Oil Centers, which are approved distributors of Engen- and PETRONAS-branded lubricants. The first Engen Oil Center was established in 2004, and they are located in metropolitan areas across South Africa, and are focused on serving small- and medium-sized clients. These Centers allow customers to correspond with Engen's Technical Services Division for product recommendations.

=== Manufacturing ===
Engen sells approximately 500 petrochemical products, many of which are manufactured in its 2 manufacturing plants. Both plants - the Lubricating Oil Blend Plant (LOBP), built in 1991, and the Zenex Blend Plant (ZBP), built in 1986 - are located in alongside the harbor in Island View, Durban, South Africa.

The LOBP manufactures a wide range of lubricants. Its primary activities are lubricants blending and filling, lube oil bulk distribution, raw material receipt, and laboratory testing. Engen blends up to 8 million liters of finished lubricants per month.

The ZBP, which became part of Engen Petroleum Limited in 2000, takes various grades of lubricating oils and processes them with the addition of viscosity-enhancing co-polymers, so as to produce various grades and types of lubricating oils. Before it was the ZBP, the plant belonged to Esso.

Engen operates the Engen Refinery in Wentworth, Durban, where it also houses the Engen Industrial hub, which incorporates land that is prepared and leased to external manufacturers and commercial tenants for a variety of activities. Engen also operates in-house activities from the site which integrate into the company's supply chain.

=== Supply chain ===
Engen's supply chain comprises a variety of infrastructure, including depots, terminals, lubricant warehouses, and aviation facilities. The company operates a bulk truck fleet, rail, and marine tankers to transport its products to consumers.

Engen uses Transnet's Durban-to-Johannesburg Pipeline (DJP) and New Multi Products Pipeline (NMPP) to transport refined petroleum products (including petrol, diesel, jet fuel, and gas) to inland South Africa.

The company represent almost all of PETRONAS Lubricants International's (PLI's) interests in Africa, and sells PLI lubricants alongside Engen lubricants at its Engen Oil Centers.

== Products ==
Products manufactured by Engen include:

- Engen Primax (Unleaded 93 Octane for altitudes 1,200 and above, and unleaded 95 Octane for altitudes below 1,200 meters)
- Engen Dynamic Diesel (50 Ppm automotive diesel)
- Engen Heavy Furnace Oil (black residual fuel designed specifically for use in, for example, boilers and certain marine engines)
- Engen Avgas 100 LL (low lead gas, manufactured by blending high octane petroleum fractions)
- Engen Jet-A1 (kerosene type aviation gas turbine engine fuel)
- Engen Marine Gas Oil (low viscosity, fully distillate fuel oil)
- Durance range of car cleaning products
- Various lubricants and chemicals

== Ownership ==
- Until 1990: Mobil South Africa
- 1990 to 1996: Gencor
- 1996: 30% PETRONAS
- 1998: 100% PETRONAS
- 1998 to 2017: 80% PETRONAS and 20% PHEMBANI
- 2017 to 2024: 74% PETRONAS, 20% PHEMBANI, and 6% PHEMBANI-led Consortium
- 2024 to present: 74% Vivo Energy and 21% PHEMBANI

Engen Petroleum (Pty) Limited is a wholly owned subsidiary of Vitol Emerald Bidco.

== Corporate social responsibility ==
Select Engen Café 365 and Brazmata outlets use cups made of bamboo, for eco-friendliness.

Since 1987, Engen has run its Engen Maths & Science School (EMSS), with the goal of societal transformation and facilitating access to STEM higher education. 10 EMSS centers currently in operation in South Africa, providing over 1,500 underprivileged grade 10 to 12 students with education.

The Engen Foundation, established during the early 2000s, focuses on supporting community development initiatives across South Africa. The foundation directs funds towards education, health, and environmental sustainability projects.

== Accolades ==
In November 2020, Engen won the Sunday Times Top Brands award for South Africans' favorite gas station for the 10th consecutive year. The award ceremony recognizes brands that have a sustained history of top consumer sentiment in South Africa.

== See also ==
- Petroleum industry in South Africa
