= Department of Mineral and Petroleum Resources =

South African national government department

Department overview
- Formed: 30 June 2024; 2 years ago
- Preceding agencies: Department of Mineral Resources; Department of Energy; Department of Mineral Resources and Energy
- Jurisdiction: Government of South Africa
- Headquarters: 25.752°S 28.188°E
- Annual budget: R27 billion (2021/2022)
- Minister responsible: Gwede Mantashe, Minister of Mineral and Petroleum Resources
- Deputy Minister responsible: Phumzile Mgcina, Deputy Minister of Mineral and Petroleum Resources
- Department executive: Jacob Mbele, Director General
- Website: dmpr.gov.za

The Department of Mineral and Petroleum Resources (DMPR) is a department of the South African government which is responsible for the mining industry of South Africa, exploitation of the country's mineral resources, and the South African petroleum industry.

The department is led by the Minister of Mineral and Petroleum Resources, who is assisted by a deputy minister. As of August 2020 the minister is ANC member Gwede Mantashe.

== History ==
The department has undergone numerous changes over the years. It had a different portfolio grouping, and was known as the Department of Minerals and Energy, until July 2009. That month, it was divided by then-President Jacob Zuma into the Department of Mineral Resources and the Department of Energy.

In June 2019 President Cyril Ramaphosa announced that the two departments were to be reunited under the current name.

In 2024, as part of the Third cabinet of Cyril Ramaphosa, the President detached the energy portfolio from the department, forming a new Department of Electricity and Energy. The DMRE was renamed the Department of Mineral and Petroleum Resources (DMPR).

== See also ==
- Petroleum industry in South Africa
- Mining in South Africa
