= Island View =

Island View may refer to:

== Places ==
- Island View, Michigan, United States
- Island View, Nova Scotia, Canada
- Island View, Saskatchewan, Canada
- Island View, Minnesota, United States
- Island View, New Zealand

== Other uses ==
- Island View Casino, in Gulfport, Mississippi, United States
- Island View High School, in Eastern Passage, Nova Scotia, Canada
- Island View Residential Treatment Center, in Syracuse, Utah, United States

== See also ==
- View Island
