= 2024 South African presidential election =

- 14 June 2024
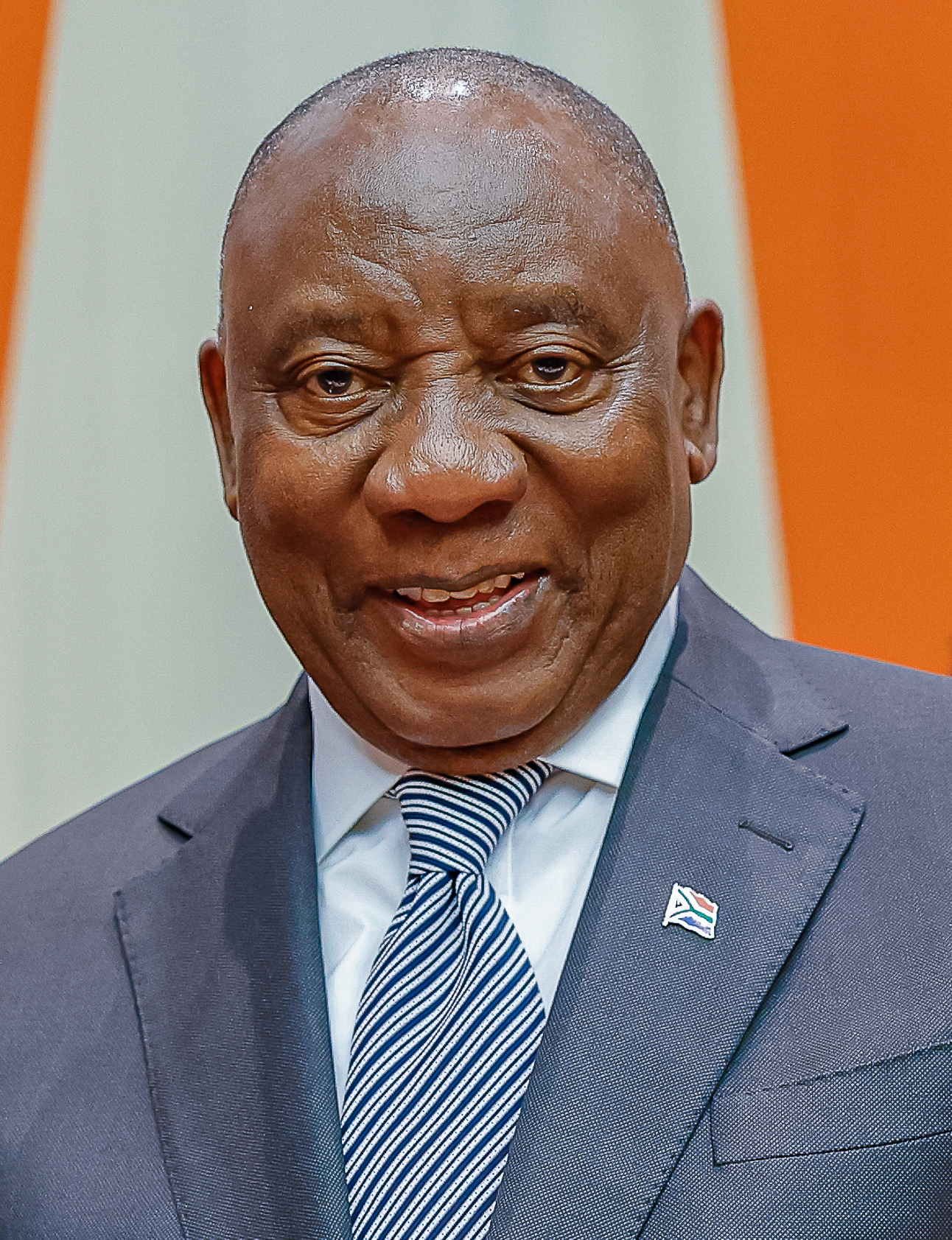

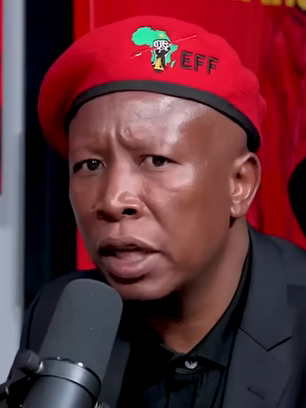
Nominee	Cyril Ramaphosa	Julius Malema
Party	ANC	EFF
Electoral vote	283	44
Percentage	86.54%	13.46%
President before election
Cyril Ramaphosa
ANC
Elected President
Cyril Ramaphosa
ANC

The indirect presidential election of the President of South Africa by the National Assembly took place on 14 June 2024, following the general election on 29 May 2024, in which the African National Congress lost the outright parliamentary majority it held from the end of apartheid. The incumbent president Cyril Ramaphosa of the African National Congress won a third term.

Former President Jacob Zuma has challenged the results of the general election in court, and declared his intention to boycott the vote on 14 June and the former president also declared that he will not be part of Government of National Unity (GNU). The day before the 2024 election, Parliament established an advisory body on electoral reform and proposals emerging from public consultations including directly electing the President.

== Results ==
Candidate	Party	Votes	%
Cyril Ramaphosa	African National Congress	283	86.54
Julius Malema	Economic Freedom Fighters	44	13.46
Total		327	100.00
Valid votes		327	96.46
Invalid/blank votes		12	3.54
Total votes		339	100.00
Registered voters/turnout		400	84.75
Source: SAnews
