= Central Energy Fund =

South African state-owned energy institution

Central Energy Fund Group
- Trade name: Central Energy Fund SOC Ltd.
- Type: SOE
- Industry: Petroleum; Renewable energy
- Founded: 2 November 1954; 71 years ago
- Headquarters: Sandton, Gauteng, South Africa
- Area served: South Africa
- Key people: Ayanda Noah (Chair); Ishmael Poolo (CEO); Tshepo Mokoka (COO); Ditsietsi Morabe (CFO)
- Revenue: R 13.89 billion (2022)
- Net income: R 62 million (2022)
- Total assets: R 10.42 billion (2022)
- Parent: Department of Mineral Resources and Energy
- Subsidiaries: African Exploration Mining and Finance Corporation; iGAS; Petroleum Agency SA; PetroSA; Strategic Fuel Fund
- Website: cefgroup.co.za

The Central Energy Fund (CEF) is a South African state-owned institution that ensures proper use of energy to meet the energy needs of South Africa, the Southern African Development Community and the sub-Saharan African region, as well as indulging in controlling of oil, gas, low-smoke fuels, electrical power, solar energy, biomass, wind and renewable energy sources.

CEF also ensures the development and flow of the oil and gas assets and operations of the South African government. The institution is derived from the CEF Act (No 38 of 1977) of South Africa. CEF makes sure that security of energy supply of South Africa and SADC through cooperation and partnership is being promoted.

In 2021, CEF's revenue was estimated to be around US$0.94 billion.

== History ==
On 2 March 2021, CEF announced to parliament a planned merger of its 3 subsidiaries, iGas, PetroSA and the Strategic Fuel Fund as the incorporated South African National Petroleum Company.

== See also ==
- Petroleum industry in South Africa
