= African Exploration Mining and Finance Corporation =

State-owned mining company of South Africa

- Trade name: African Exploration Mining and Finance Corporation (SOC) LTD
- Founded: 1944; 82 years ago
- Headquarters: 74 Waterfall Drive, Waterfall City, 2090, City of Johannesburg Metropolitan Municipality, Gauteng, South Africa
- Total assets: ▲ R 1 034 045 000 (2019); R 764 461 000 (2018)
- Total equity: R 361 million (2019)
- Parent: CEF, a parastatal owned by the government of South Africa
- Website: www.aemfc.co.za

The African Exploration Mining and Finance Corporation (AEMFC) is a state-controlled mining business in South Africa.

== History ==
The AEMFC was launched by Jacob Zuma, the former president of South Africa, prompting concerns that the state might attempt to nationalise parts of the mining industry.

First established in 1944, it lay dormant for years, before beginning activities in 2007. It has been granted mining and prospecting rights, in competition with other mining companies. AEMFC is, officially, subsidiary to the Central Energy Fund.

In February 2011, the AEMFC launched a coal mining project in Mpumalanga, which is expected to produce 1.68 million tons of coal per year.

As of October 2012, AEMFC was still loss-making, but gets interest-free loans from the Central Energy Fund (R209M as of 2016). Performance of its coal, limestone, and uranium mines has been disappointing. It moved into profit, by March 2013 stating a profit of R77M per year, and an equity of R490K, despite a loss of 54 409 tonnes of uninsured coal which was burned.

== Activities ==
AEMFC owns the Vlakfontein coal mine in Ogies which supplies the Kendal Power Station run by Eskom.
