= Department of Mineral Resources (South Africa) =

Department of the national government of South Africa

- List: 10 other official names: Departement van Minerale (Afrikaans); umNyango wezEnjiwako (Southern Ndebele); ISebe leZimbiwa (Xhosa); uMnyango wezamaMineral (Zulu); LiTiko leTimbiwa (Swazi); Kgoro ya Dimenerale (Northern Sotho); Lefapha la Diminerale (Sotho); Lefapha la Diminerale (Tswana); Ndzawulo ya Timinerali (Tsonga); Muhasho wa zwa Minirala (Venda)

Department overview
- Formed: 7 July 2009
- Preceding department: Department of Minerals and Energy
- Type: Department
- Jurisdiction: Government of South Africa
- Headquarters: Travenna Office Campus, 75 Meintjies Street, Sunnyside, Pretoria; 25°44′56″S 28°12′05″E
- Employees: 1 099 (2012)
- Annual budget: R1 394 million (2013–14)
- Minister responsible: Gwede Mantashe, Minister of Mineral Resources
- Deputy Minister responsible: Godfrey Oliphant, Deputy Minister of Mineral Resources
- Department executive: Dr Thibedi Ramontja, Director-General: Mineral Resources
- Key documents: Mineral and Petroleum Resources Development Act, 2002; Mine Health and Safety Act, 1996
- Website: www.dmr.gov.za

The Department of Mineral Resources was a department of the national government of South Africa which was responsible for overseeing the mining industry of South Africa and the exploitation of the country's mineral resources. The department's origins lay the creation in the 1890s of the "Department van Mijnwezen" (Department of Mining) in the government of the Transvaal Republic. It existed under this name since 2009 when the Department of Minerals and Energy was divided and the Department of Energy was created. As of 2013 the political head of the department, the Minister of Mineral Resources, was Ngoako Ramatlhodi and his deputy was Godfrey Oliphant.

In the beginning of June 2014, during the platinum wage dispute between mining companies and the Association of Mineworkers and Construction Union (AMCU), Ramatlhodi threatened that the Department of Mineral Resources would withdraw from the negotiation process. An agreement between the sides was reached by the end of the same month.

In September 2015, Mosebenzi Joseph Zwane was appointed as the Minister of Mineral Resources.[3] The replacement of Ngoako Ramatlhodi was considered controversial and greeted with criticism from Labour Unions.

On his appointment, Zwane urged a quick resolution to mining disputes and labour disruptions. In 2016, he was applauded for his resolution of Section 54 mine stoppage issues that had been negatively impacting mine production.

In January 2017, during a judgement on the case between Aquila Steel and six respondents, which included the Minister of Mineral Resources and the department's management, the Gauteng division of the High Court of South Africa stated that the DMR stood in the way of private investment into the mining industry in South Africa, and failed to resolve central issues in a time effective and responsible manner, thus building a solid case for its own substitution.

The department had its head office in the Trevenna Office Campus in Sunnyside, a suburb of the national capital Pretoria. There were regional offices in Polokwane, eMalahleni, Johannesburg, Klerksdorp, Durban, Port Elizabeth, Mthatha, Cape Town, Kimberley, Springbok and Welkom. The department had 1 099 employees in 2012, and received a budget of R1 394 million for the 2013–14 financial year.

The department's chief inspector of mines was David Msiza.
