= Department of Communications and Digital Technologies =

South African governmental organization

- List: 10 other official names: Departement van Kommunikasie (Afrikaans); UmNyango wezokuThintana (Southern Ndebele); ISebe lezoNxibelelwano (Xhosa); uMnyango wezokuXhumana (Zulu); LiTiko leTekuchumana (Swazi); Kgoro ya Dikgokagano (Northern Sotho); Lefapha la Dikgokahano (Sotho); Lefapha la Ditlhaeletsano (Tswana); Ndzawulo ya swa Vuhlanganisi (Tsonga); Muhasho wa Vhudavhidzani (Venda)

Agency overview
- Formed: 1910; 116 years ago (original form); 2019; 7 years ago (current form)
- Jurisdiction: Government of South Africa
- Headquarters: Hatfield, Pretoria
- Annual budget: R 2.55 billion (2026/27)
- Ministers responsible: Solly Malatsi, Minister of Communications and Digital Technologies; Mondli Gungubele, Deputy Minister of Communications and Digital Technologies
- Child agencies: SAPO; Sentech; ZANDA; NEMISA; USAASA; e-SI
- Website: dcdt.gov.za

The Department of Communications and Digital Technologies (formerly the Department of Telecommunications and Postal Services and the Department of Communications) is one of the departments of the South African government. It is responsible for overseeing the South African communications, telecommunications, broadcasting, and postal industries.

The political head of the department is the Minister of Communications and Digital Technologies, who is assisted by a deputy minister. As of August 2021 the minister is Khumbudzo Ntshavheni and her deputy is Philly Mapulane.

In 2014, then-President Jacob Zuma renamed the original Department of Communications to the Department of Telecommunications and Postal Services, at the same time creating a new Department of Communications with different responsibilities, including propaganda.

In June 2019, President Cyril Ramaphosa announced that the two departments would be merged to create the Department of Communications and Digital Technologies.

== List of Ministers ==
Term started	Term ended	Minister surname	Minister name(s)	Date of birth	Date of death	Under Prime Minister / President	Political Party
Pre-democratic South Africa
1910	1912	Graaff	David Pieter de Villiers	30 March 1859	13 April 1931	Botha, L.	South African Party
1912	1912	Leuchars	George	16 April 1858	10 February 1924	Botha, L.	South African Party
1912	1915	Watt	Thomas	1857	1947	Botha, L.	South African Party
1915	1919	Beck	Johannes Hendricus Meiring	28 November 1855	15 May 1919	Botha, L.	South African Party
1919	1920	Orr	Thomas	1874		Smuts, J. C.	South African Party
1920	1921	Graaff	Jacobus Arnoldus Combrinck	4 March 1863	5 April 1927	Smuts, J. C.	South African Party
1921	1924	Watt	Thomas	1857	1947	Smuts, J. C.	South African Party
1924	1925	Boydell	Thomas	1882	5 July 1966	Hertzog, J. B. M.	National Party
1925	1928	Madeley	Walter Bayley	28 July 1873	15 May 1947	Hertzog, J. B. M.	National Party
1928	1929	Sampson	Henry William	12 May 1872	6 August 1938	Hertzog, J. B. M.	National Party
1929	1945	Clarkson	Charles Francis	1881	1959	Hertzog, J. B. M. and Smuts, J. C.	National Party and United Party
1945	1950	Erasmus	Frans Christiaan	1896		Smuts, J. C.	United Party and National Party
1950	1954	Naudé	Jozua Francois	15 April 1889	31 May 1969	Malan, D. F.	National Party
1954	1958	Serfontein	Jan			Strijdom, J. G.	National Party
1958	1968	Hertzog	Johannes Albertus Munnik	4 July 1899	5 November 1982	Verwoerd, H. F. and Vorster, B. J.	National Party
1968	1970	Janse van Rensburg	Matthys Cornelis Grove	12 February 1919	1970	Vorster, B. J.	National Party
1970	1976	Viljoen	Marais	2 December 1915	4 January 2007	Vorster, B. J.	National Party
1976	1978	van der Spuy	Johannes Petrus	24 November 1912	13 September 2003	Vorster, B. J.	National Party
1978	1978	Smit	Hennie			Botha, P. W.	National Party
1978	1979	de Klerk	Frederik Willem	18 March 1936		Botha, P. W.	National Party
1982	1984	Munnik	Lourens Albertus Petrus Anderson	1925	12 July 2016	Botha, P. W.	National Party
1984	1991	Bartlett	George	14 March 1931	25 March 2010	de Klerk, F. W.	National Party
1991	1994	Welgemoed	Peter Johannes	1943		de Klerk, F. W.	National Party
Post-democratic South Africa
1994	1996	Jordan	Zweledinga Pallo	22 May 1942		Mandela, N. R.	African National Congress
1996	1999	Naidoo	Jayaseelen	20 December 1954		Mandela, N. R.	ANC
1999	2009	Casaburri	Ivy Florence Matsepe	18 September 1937	6 April 2009	Mbeki, T. M. and Motlanthe, K. P.	ANC
2009	2010	Nyanda	Siphwe	22 May 1950		Zuma, J. G.	ANC
2010	2011	Padayachie	Radhakrishna Lutchmana	1 May 1950	5 May 2002	Zuma, J. G.	ANC
2011	2013	Pule	Dinah Deliwe			Zuma, J. G.	ANC
2013	2014	Carrim	Yunus			Zuma, J. G.	ANC
2014	2017	Muthambi	Azwihangwisi Faith			Zuma, J. G.	ANC
2017	2017	Dlodlo	Ayanda	22 May 1963		Zuma, J. G.	ANC
2017	2018	Kubayi-Ngubane	Mmamoloko Tryphosa			Zuma, J. G.	ANC
2018	2018	Cwele	Siyabonga Cyprian	3 September 1958		Ramaphosa, M. C.	ANC
2018	2018	Mokonyane	Nomvula	20 June 1963		Ramaphosa, M. C.	ANC
2018	2021	Ndabeni-Abrahams	Stella Tembisa	30 June 1978		Ramaphosa, M. C.	ANC
2021	2023	Ntshavheni	Khumbudzo	30 January 1977		Ramaphosa, M. C.	ANC
2023	2024	Gungubele	Mondli	1 February 1957		Ramaphosa, M. C.	ANC
2024		Malatsi	Solly	22 December 1985		Ramaphosa, M. C.	Democratic Alliance

== Portfolio organisations ==
Portfolio organisations are those public enterprises (i.e. parastatals) that report to the South African Government via the Ministry of Communications. These are:

- Broadband Infraco
- Independent Communications Authority of South Africa
- South African Post Office
- Sentech
- .za Domain Name Authority (.ZADNA)
- National Electronic Media Institute of South Africa
- Universal Service and Access Agency of South Africa
- e-Skills Institute
