= First cabinet of Jacob Zuma =

First Zuma Cabinet
- 5th Cabinet of the Republic of South Africa (since the 1994 election)
- 2009–2014
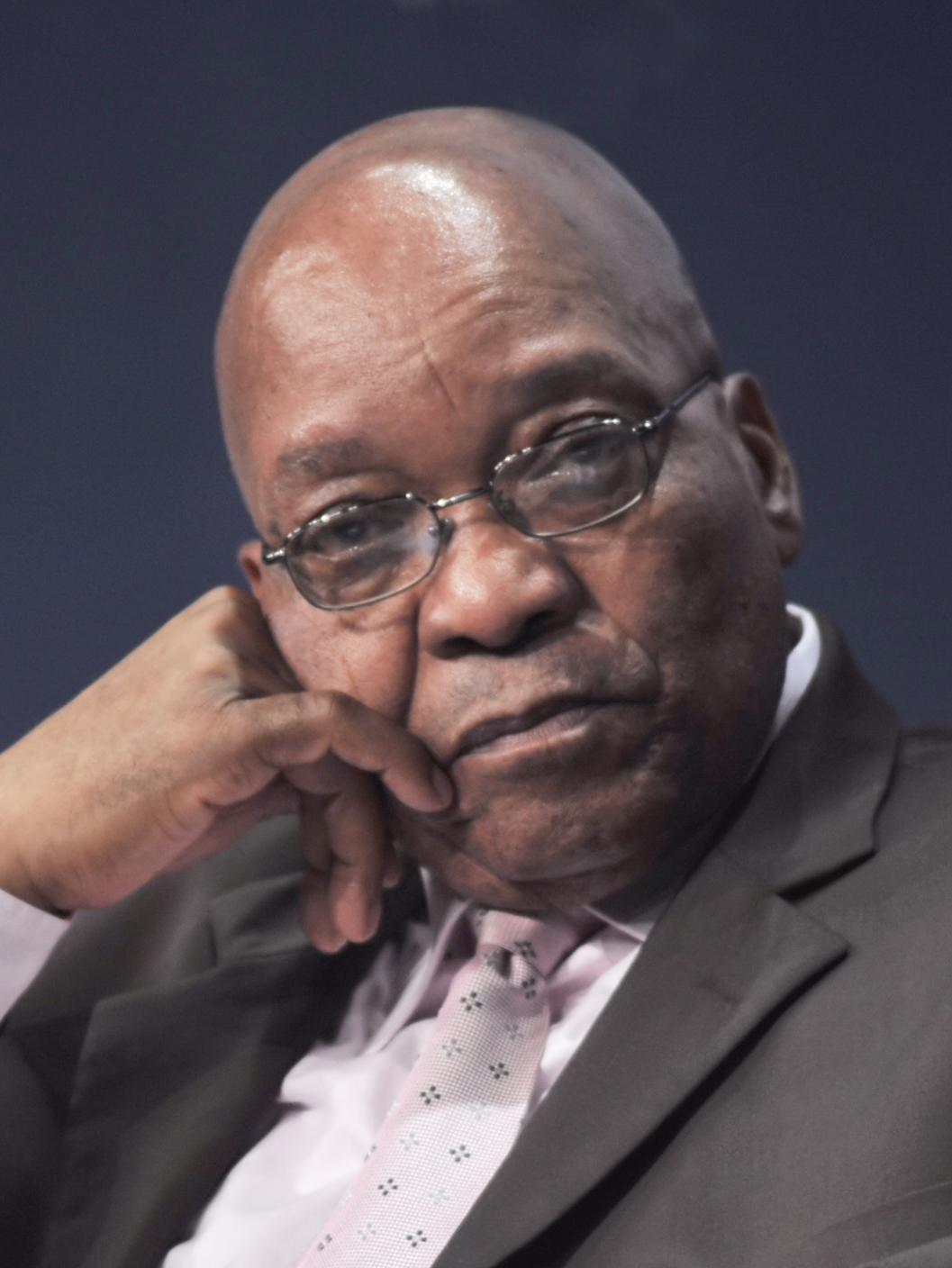
- Jacob Zuma (2009)
- Date formed: 10 May 2009
- Date dissolved: 24 May 2014 (5 years and 14 days)

People and organisations
- President: Jacob Zuma
- Deputy President: Kgalema Motlanthe
- No. of ministers: 34 ministers
- Member parties: African National Congress
- Status in legislature: Majority
- Opposition parties: Democratic Alliance
- Opposition leaders: Athol Trollip (until 2011); Lindiwe Mazibuko (from 2011)

History
- Election: 2009 election
- Legislature term: Fourth Parliament
- Predecessor: Motlanthe
- Successor: Zuma II

Following his election as President of South Africa in the 2009 general election, Jacob Zuma announced his first cabinet on 10 May 2009. There were a total of 34 ministerial portfolios in the cabinet.

== Appointment ==
After the African National Congress (ANC) won a majority in the April 2009 general election, Jacob Zuma was inaugurated as President of South Africa on 9 May 2009 and announced his cabinet the following day. His cabinet announcement outlined several changes to the structure of the cabinet:

- The Ministry of Minerals and Energy was bifurcated into a Ministry of Mining and a Ministry of Energy;
- The Ministry of Education was bifurcated into a Ministry of Basic Education and Ministry of Higher Education and Training;
- The Ministry of Economic Development was established;
- The Ministry of Women, Youth, Children and People with Disabilities was established;
- Where there had previously been one Minister in the Presidency without a specified portfolio, there would henceforth be two Ministers in the Presidency, one with responsibility for the newly established National Planning Commission and the other with responsibility for the monitoring and evaluation function and for administration; and
- Environment-related functions were re-allocated: where there had previously been a Ministry of Agriculture and Land Affairs, a Ministry of Environmental Affairs and Tourism, and a Ministry of Water Affairs and Forestry, there was henceforth a Ministry of Agriculture, Forestry and Fisheries, a Ministry of Rural Development and Land Reform, a Ministry of Water and Environmental Affairs, and a Ministry of Tourism.

In addition to these structural changes, six other ministries had new names: the Ministry of Defence and Military Veterans (formerly the Ministry of Defence), the Ministry of International Relations and Cooperation (formerly Foreign Affairs), the Ministry of Human Settlements (Housing), the Ministry of State Security (Intelligence), the Ministry of Police (Safety and Security), and the Ministry of Cooperative Governance and Traditional Affairs (Provincial and Local Government).

All of the ministers appointed by Zuma were members of his political party, the ANC.

== Reshuffles ==
On 31 October 2010, President Zuma announced his first cabinet reshuffle, a major reshuffle in which seven ministers were sacked and two others were reassigned. In a second reshuffle less than a year later, on 24 October 2011, two ministers were removed and two others were reassigned to new portfolios; the dismissed ministers were Gwen Mahlangu-Nkabinde and Sicelo Shiceka, both of whom had been implicated in misconduct by the Public Protector.

On 12 June 2012, Zuma announced his third reshuffle, occasioned by the death of Minister Roy Padayachie. The reshuffle affected ministers in four portfolios. On 3 October 2012, Zuma announced a further, minor reshuffle, this time occasioned by Minister Nkosazana Dlamini-Zuma's election as chairperson of the African Union Commission; the reshuffle affected only two portfolios.

In a final reshuffle on 9 July 2013, Zuma fired three ministers: Dina Pule, Tokyo Sexwale, and Richard Baloyi. They were replaced by Yunus Carrim, Connie September, and Lech Tsenoli, respectively, and two other ministers – Ben Martins and Dipuo Peters – swopped portfolios.

== List of ministers ==
Legend
African National Congress

Post		Minister	Term		Party
	President of South Africa	His Excellency Jacob Zuma	2009	2018	ANC
	Deputy President of South Africa	His Excellency Kgalema Motlanthe	2009	2014	ANC
	Minister in the Presidency for the National Planning Commission	The Hon. Trevor Manuel MP	2009	2014	ANC
	Minister in the Presidency for Performance Monitoring, Evaluation and Administration	The Hon. Collins Chabane MP	2009	2014	ANC
	Minister of Agriculture, Forestry and Fisheries	The Hon. Tina Joemat-Peterson MP	2009	2014	ANC
	Minister of Arts and Culture	The Hon. Paul Mashatile MP	2010	2014	ANC
'	Minister of Arts and Culture	The Hon. Lulu Xingwana MP	2009	2010	ANC
	Minister of Basic Education	The Hon. Angie Motshekga MP	2009	2024	ANC
	Minister of Communications	The Hon. Yunus Carrim MP	2013	2014	ANC
	Minister of Communications	The Hon. Dina Pule MP	2011	2013	ANC
	Minister of Communications	The Hon. Roy Padayachie MP	2010	2011	ANC
	Minister of Communications	The Hon. Siphiwe Nyanda MP	2009	2010	ANC
	Minister of Cooperative Governance and Traditional Affairs	The Hon. Solomon Lechesa Tsenoli MP	2013	2014	ANC
	Minister of Cooperative Governance and Traditional Affairs	The Hon. Richard Baloyi MP	2011	2013	ANC
	Minister of Cooperative Governance and Traditional Affairs	The Hon. Sicelo Shiceka MP	2009	2011	ANC
	Minister of Correctional Services	The Hon. S'bu Ndebele MP	2012	2014	ANC
	Minister of Correctional Services	The Hon. Nosiviwe Mapisa-Nqakula MP	2009	2012	ANC
	Minister of Defence and Military Veterans	The Hon. Nosiviwe Mapisa-Nqakula MP	2012	2021	ANC
	Minister of Defence and Military Veterans	The Hon. Lindiwe Sisulu MP	2009	2012	ANC
	Minister of Economic Development	The Hon. Ebrahim Patel MP	2009	2019	ANC
	Minister of Energy	The Hon. Ben Martins MP	2013	2014	ANC
	Minister of Energy	The Hon. Dipuo Peters MP	2009	2013	ANC
	Minister of Finance	The Hon. Pravin Gordhan MP	2009	2014	ANC
	Minister of Health	The Hon. Aaron Motsoaledi MP	2009	2019	ANC
	Minister of Higher Education and Training	The Hon. Blade Nzimande MP	2009	2017	ANC
	Minister of Home Affairs	The Hon. Naledi Pandor MP	2012	2014	ANC
	Minister of Home Affairs	The Hon. Nkosazana Dlamini-Zuma MP	2009	2012	ANC
	Minister of Human Settlements	The Hon. Connie September MP	2013	2014	ANC
	Minister of Human Settlements	The Hon. Tokyo Sexwale MP	2009	2013	ANC
	Minister of International Relations and Cooperation	The Hon. Maite Nkoana-Mashabane MP	2009	2018	ANC
	Minister of Justice and Constitutional Development	The Hon. Jeff Radebe MP	2009	2014	ANC
	Minister of Labour	The Hon. Mildred Oliphant MP	2010	2019	ANC
	Minister of Labour	The Hon. Membathisi Mdladlana MP	2009	2010	ANC
	Minister of Mineral Resources	The Hon. Susan Shabangu MP	2009	2014	ANC
	Minister of Police	The Hon. Nathi Mthethwa MP	2009	2014	ANC
	Minister of Public Enterprises	The Hon. Malusi Gigaba MP	2010	2014	ANC
	Minister of Public Enterprises	The Hon. Barbara Hogan MP	2009	2010	ANC
	Minister of Public Service and Administration	The Hon. Lindiwe Sisulu MP	2012	2014	ANC
	Minister of Public Service and Administration	The Hon. Roy Padayachie MP	2011	2012	ANC
	Minister of Public Service and Administration	The Hon. Richard Baloyi MP	2009	2011	ANC
	Minister of Public Works	The Hon. Thulas Nxesi MP	2011	2017	ANC
	Minister of Public Works	The Hon. Gwen Mahlangu-Nkabinde MP	2010	2011	ANC
	Minister of Public Works	The Hon. Geoff Doidge MP	2009	2010	ANC
	Minister of Rural Development and Land Reform	The Hon. Gugile Nkwinti MP	2009	2018	ANC
	Minister of Science and Technology	The Hon. Derek Hanekom MP	2012	2014	ANC
	Minister of Science and Technology	The Hon. Naledi Pandor MP	2009	2012	ANC
	Minister of Social Development	The Hon. Bathabile Dlamini MP	2010	2018	ANC
	Minister of Social Development	The Hon. Edna Molewa MP	2009	2010	ANC
	Minister of Sport and Recreation	The Hon. Fikile Mbalula MP	2010	2017	ANC
	Minister of Sport and Recreation	The Hon. Makhenkesi Stofile MP	2009	2010	ANC
	Minister of State Security	The Hon. Siyabonga Cwele MP	2009	2014	ANC
	Minister of Tourism	The Hon. Marthinus van Schalkwyk MP	2009	2014	ANC
	Minister of Trade and Industry	The Hon. Rob Davies MP	2009	2019	ANC
	Minister of Transport	The Hon. Dipuo Peters MP	2013	2017	ANC
	Minister of Transport	The Hon. Ben Martins MP	2012	2013	ANC
	Minister of Transport	The Hon. S'bu Ndebele MP	2009	2012	ANC
	Minister of Water and Environmental Affairs	The Hon. Edna Molewa MP	2010	2014	ANC
	Minister of Water and Environmental Affairs	The Hon. Buyelwa Sonjica MP	2009	2010	ANC
	Minister of Women, Youth, Children and People with Disabilities	The Hon. Lulu Xingwana MP	2010	2014	ANC
	Minister of Women, Youth, Children and People with Disabilities	The Hon. Noluthando Mayende-Sibiya MP	2009	2010	ANC

== List of deputy ministers ==
Although deputy ministers are not members of the cabinet, they are appointed by the president and assist cabinet ministers in the execution of their duties. During the term of Zuma's second cabinet, the deputy ministers were, like the cabinet, appointed on 10 May 2009; they included one opposition politician, Pieter Mulder of the Freedom Front Plus. The allocation of deputy ministerial positions was affected by four of Zuma's five cabinet reshuffles: 17 portfolios were affected by the 31 October 2010 reshuffle (including the portfolio of former deputy minister Molefi Sefularo, who had died), six by the October 2011 reshuffle, five by the June 2012 reshuffle (including the portfolio of former deputy minister Enoch Godongwana, who had resigned amid a fraud scandal), and four by the July 2013 reshuffle.

These reshuffles also involved the establishment of several new deputy minister posts. In October 2010, Zuma appointed, for the first time, a Deputy Minister of Energy, Deputy Minister of Higher Education and Training, and Deputy Minister of Mineral Resources (the new name for the mining portfolio), as well as a Deputy Minister in the Presidency for Performance Monitoring, Evaluation, and Administration. In October 2011 he decreed that the Ministry of Public Works would no longer have a deputy minister but that the Ministry of Women, Youth, Children and People with Disabilities would have one, though a new Deputy Minister of Public Works was ultimately appointed in June 2012. The position of Deputy Minister of Science and Technology became vacant in October 2012, when the incumbent, Derek Hanekom, was promoted to cabinet, and it was not filled again until the next cabinet reshuffle in July 2013. Zuma did not at any stage appoint a Deputy Minister of Labour, a Deputy Minister of State Security, or a Deputy Minister for the National Planning Commission.

Post	Minister	Term		Party
Deputy Minister in the Presidency for Performance Monitoring, Evaluation and Administration	The Hon. Obed Bapela MP	2011	2014	ANC
Deputy Minister in the Presidency for Performance Monitoring, Evaluation and Administration	The Hon. Dina Pule MP	2010	2011	ANC
Deputy Minister of Agriculture, Forestry and Fisheries	The Hon. Pieter Mulder MP	2009	2014	FF+
Deputy Minister of Arts and Culture	The Hon. Joe Phaahla MP	2010	2014	ANC
Deputy Minister of Arts and Culture	The Hon. Paul Mashatile MP	2009	2010	ANC
Deputy Minister of Basic Education	The Hon. Enver Surty MP	2009	2014	ANC
Deputy Minister of Communications	The Hon. Stella Ndabeni MP	2011	2014	ANC
Deputy Minister of Communications	The Hon. Obed Bapela MP	2010	2011	ANC
Deputy Minister of Communications	The Hon. Dina Pule MP	2009	2010	ANC
Deputy Minister of Cooperative Governance and Traditional Affairs	The Hon. Andries Nel MP	2013	2014	ANC
Deputy Minister of Cooperative Governance and Traditional Affairs	The Hon. Yunus Carrim MP	2009	2013	ANC
Deputy Minister of Correctional Services	The Hon. Ngoako Ramatlhodi MP	2010	2014	ANC
Deputy Minister of Correctional Services	The Hon. Hlengiwe Mkhize MP	2009	2010	ANC
Deputy Minister of Defence and Military Veterans	The Hon. Thabang Makwetla MP	2009	2014	ANC
Deputy Minister of Economic Development	The Hon. Hlengiwe Mkhize MP	2012	2014	ANC
Deputy Minister of Economic Development	The Hon. Enoch Godongwana MP	2010	2012	ANC
Deputy Minister of Economic Development	The Hon. Gwen Mahlangu-Nkabinde MP	2009	2010	ANC
Deputy Minister of Energy	The Hon. Barbara Thomson MP	2010	2014	ANC
Deputy Minister of Finance	The Hon. Nhlanhla Nene MP	2009	2014	ANC
Deputy Minister of Health	The Hon. Gwen Ramokgopa MP	2010	2014	ANC
Deputy Minister of Health	The Hon. Molefi Sefularo MP	2009	2010	ANC
Deputy Minister of Higher Education and Training	The Hon. Mduduzi Manana MP	2012	2014	ANC
Deputy Minister of Higher Education and Training	The Hon. Hlengiwe Mkhize MP	2010	2012	ANC
Deputy Minister of Home Affairs	The Hon. Fatima Chohan MP	2010	2014	ANC
Deputy Minister of Home Affairs	The Hon. Malusi Gigaba MP	2009	2010	ANC
Deputy Minister of Human Settlements	The Hon. Zou Kota MP	2009	2019	ANC
Deputy Minister of International Relations and Cooperation 1st	The Hon. Ebrahim Ebrahim MP	2009	2014	ANC
Deputy Minister of International Relations and Cooperation 2nd	The Hon. Marius Fransman MP	2010	2014	ANC
Deputy Minister of International Relations and Cooperation 2nd	The Hon. Sue van der Merwe MP	2009	2010	ANC
Deputy Minister of Justice and Constitutional Development	The Hon. John Jeffery MP	2013	2014	ANC
Deputy Minister of Justice and Constitutional Development	The Hon. Andries Nel MP	2009	2013	ANC
Deputy Minister of Mineral Resources	The Hon. Godfrey Oliphant MP	2010	2014	ANC
Deputy Minister of Police	The Hon. Maggie Sotyu MP	2010	2014	ANC
Deputy Minister of Police	The Hon. Fikile Mbalula MP	2009	2010	ANC
Deputy Minister of Public Enterprises	The Hon. Gratitude Magwanishe MP	2012	2014	ANC
Deputy Minister of Public Enterprises	The Hon. Ben Martins MP	2010	2012	ANC
Deputy Minister of Public Enterprises	The Hon. Enoch Godongwana MP	2009	2010	ANC
Deputy Minister of Public Service and Administration	The Hon. Ayanda Dlodlo MP	2010	2014	ANC
Deputy Minister of Public Service and Administration	The Hon. Roy Padayachie MP	2009	2010	ANC
Deputy Minister of Public Works	The Hon. Jeremy Cronin MP	2012	2014	ANC
Deputy Minister of Public Works	The Hon. Hendrietta Bogopane-Zulu MP	2009	2011	ANC
Deputy Minister of Rural Development and Land Reform	The Hon. Pam Tshwete MP	2013	2014	ANC
Deputy Minister of Rural Development and Land Reform	The Hon. Lech Tsenoli MP	2011	2013	ANC
Deputy Minister of Rural Development and Land Reform	The Hon. Thulas Nxesi MP	2010	2011	ANC
Deputy Minister of Rural Development and Land Reform	The Hon. Joe Phaahla MP	2009	2010	ANC
Deputy Minister of Science and Technology	The Hon. Michael Masutha MP	2013	2014	ANC
Deputy Minister of Science and Technology	The Hon. Derek Hanekom MP	2009	2012	ANC
Deputy Minister of Social Development	The Hon. Maria Ntuli MP	2010	2014	ANC
Deputy Minister of Social Development	The Hon. Bathabile Dlamini MP	2009	2010	ANC
Deputy Minister of Sport and Recreation	The Hon. Gert Oosthuizen MP	2009	2014	ANC
Deputy Minister of Tourism	The Hon. Tokozile Xasa MP	2009	2014	ANC
Deputy Minister of Trade and Industry 1st	The Hon. Thandi Tobias MP	2009	2014	ANC
Deputy Minister of Trade and Industry 2nd	The Hon. Elizabeth Thabethe MP	2010	2014	ANC
Deputy Minister of Trade and Industry 2nd	The Hon. Maria Ntuli MP	2009	2010	ANC
Deputy Minister of Transport	The Hon. Sindy Chikunga MP	2012	2014	ANC
Deputy Minister of Transport	The Hon. Jeremy Cronin MP	2009	2012	ANC
Deputy Minister of Water and Environmental Affairs	The Hon. Joyce Mabudafhasi MP	2009	2014	ANC
Deputy Minister of Women, Youth, Children and People with Disabilities	The Hon. Hendrietta Bogopane-Zulu MP	2011	2014	ANC
