= Richard Baloyi =

South African politician (born 1958)

Member of the National Assembly
- In office 14 June 1999 – 10 July 2013
- Constituency: Limpopo (1999–2009)

Minister of Cooperative Governance and Traditional Affairs
- In office 24 October 2011 – 9 July 2013
- President: Jacob Zuma
- Deputy: Yunus Carrim
- Preceded by: Sicelo Shiceka
- Succeeded by: Lech Tsenoli

Minister of Public Service and Administration
- In office 25 September 2008 – 24 October 2011
- President: Jacob Zuma; Kgalema Motlanthe
- Deputy: Ayanda Dlodlo; Roy Padayachie
- Preceded by: Geraldine Fraser-Moleketi
- Succeeded by: Roy Padayachie

Personal details
- Born: 25 December 1958 (age 67) Shawela, Transvaal; Union of South Africa
- Party: African National Congress
- Education: University of the North

Masenyani Richard Baloyi (born 25 December 1958) is a South African politician from Limpopo. He was the Minister of Cooperative Governance and Traditional Affairs from October 2011 to July 2013 and, before that, the Minister of Public Service and Administration from September 2008 to October 2011. He represented the African National Congress (ANC) in the National Assembly of South Africa between 1999 and 2013.

Baloyi joined the national executive in 2008 as a member of the cabinet of President Kgalema Motlanthe, and he was retained in the first-term cabinet of President Jacob Zuma. After Zuma sacked him from the cabinet in July 2013, Baloyi resigned from the National Assembly; he went on to serve as Zuma's Ambassador to the Republic of Congo between March 2014 and June 2018.

== Early life and education ==
Baloyi was born on 25 December 1958, in Shawela in present-day Limpopo Province. He holds a Bachelor of Arts from the University of the North, and he also completed a leadership development programme at the University of Botswana.

== Political career ==
During apartheid, Baloyi was an activist in the United Democratic Front. He later became active in the African National Congress (ANC) in his home region, serving as secretary of his local branch in Giyani and ultimately rising to membership in the party's Provincial Executive Committee in Limpopo. At the same time, he represented the ANC in the Parliament of South Africa, gaining election to the National Assembly in the June 1999 general election and re-election in the April 2004 general election. During his two terms as an ordinary Member of Parliament, he represented the Limpopo constituency and served in several parliamentary committees, including the Portfolio Committee on Public Service and Administration, the National Assembly Rules Committee, the Joint Committee on Ethics and Members' Interest, and an ad hoc committee on the African Peer Review Mechanism on Democracy and Good Governance.

=== Minister of Public Service and Administration: 2008–2011 ===
On 25 September 2008, Baloyi was appointed as Minister of Public Service and Administration by Kgalema Motlanthe, who had that day been elected as the third President of South Africa. Motlanthe's cabinet served only until the April 2009 general election, but Baloyi was reappointed to the same position in the successor cabinet of President Jacob Zuma. At the same time, in the 2009 election, he secured election to his third term in the National Assembly, this time gaining election from the ANC's national party list.

The Mail & Guardian reported that Baloyi had an unhappy relationship with Ayanda Dlodlo, who was Deputy Minister of Public Service and Administration from November 2010.

==== Public-sector wage negotiations ====
In August 2010, Baloyi's department failed to settle wage negotiations with public servants, leading to a major strike by public-sector unions. The dispute was resolved in October 2010, when a majority of unions accepted a 7.5 per cent salary increase, but Baloyi was roundly criticised for his handling of the strike. Themba Mthembu of the South African Communist Party said he was a "bad negotiator" who had "handled the strike and negotiations... like he was watching the Olympics", while Athol Trollip of the opposition Democratic Alliance called for Zuma to fire Baloyi for his "clumsy handling of labour relations". In October 2019, Finance Minister Tito Mboweni publicly alleged that Baloyi was partly responsible for unsustainable inflation of the public-sector wage bill.

==== Themba Maseko transfer ====
In February 2011, Baloyi announced the appointment of Jimmy Manyi as head of the Government Communication and Information System (GCIS), controversially transferring the incumbent GCIS head, Themba Maseko, to become director-general in Baloyi's own Department of Public Service and Administration. Maseko later claimed that he was transferred because he refused to acquiesce in state capture by the Gupta brothers, an allegation which precipitated an inquiry by the Zondo Commission. Appearing at the Zondo Commission in 2019, Baloyi claimed that he had not made the decision to transfer Maseko and appoint Manyi, but rather had been instructed by the Minister in the Presidency, Collins Chabane, to carry out the transfer; the commission's report described his testimony as flimsy and tinged with "desperation".

=== Minister of Cooperative Governance and Traditional Affairs: 2011–2013 ===
On 24 October 2011, President Zuma announced a cabinet reshuffle in which Baloyi was appointed as Minister of Cooperative Governance and Traditional Affairs. He replaced Sicelo Shiceka, who had been implicated in misconduct by the Public Protector. The Mail & Guardian said that, during his two years in this portfolio, Baloyi was viewed "as one of the worst performing ministers in the Cabinet".

On 9 July 2013, in another cabinet reshuffle, President Zuma announced that Baloyi had been sacked and replaced by Lech Tsenoli. Two weeks later, a parliamentary spokesperson announced that Baloyi had resigned from his parliamentary seat soon after the reshuffle, with effect from 10 July. His seat was filled by Francois Beukman.

== Diplomatic career ==
In the aftermath of Baloyi's resignation from Parliament, press reported that he was expected to replace Stan Mathabatha as South African Ambassador to Ukraine. Instead, Zuma appointed him as South African Ambassador to the Republic of Congo; he was stationed in Brazzaville between March 2014 and June 2018.

== Personal life ==
In 2010 Baloyi launched a philanthropic trust which aimed to support soccer development in his hometown.
