= Obed Bapela =

South African politician

The Honourable Obed Bapela

Deputy Minister of Public Enterprises
- In office 6 March 2023 – 17 June 2024
- President: Cyril Ramaphosa
- Minister: Pravin Gordhan
- Preceded by: Phumulo Masualle

Member of the National Assembly
- In office 2002 – 28 May 2024

Deputy Minister of Cooperative Governance and Traditional Affairs
- In office 26 May 2014 – 6 March 2023 Serving with Andries Nel, Parks Tau and Thembi Nkadimeng
- President: Jacob Zuma; Cyril Ramaphosa
- Minister: Pravin Gordhan; Des van Rooyen; Zweli Mkhize; Nkosazana Dlamini-Zuma
- Succeeded by: Zolile Burns-Ncamashe

Deputy Minister in the Presidency for Performance Monitoring and Evaluation
- In office 24 October 2011 – 24 April 2014
- President: Jacob Zuma
- Minister: Collins Chabane
- Preceded by: Dina Pule
- Succeeded by: Buti Manamela

Deputy Minister of Communications
- In office 1 November 2010 – 24 October 2011
- President: Jacob Zuma
- Minister: Roy Padayachie
- Preceded by: Dina Pule
- Succeeded by: Stella Ndabeni

Personal details
- Born: Kopeng Obed Bapela; 28 February 1958 (age 68) Alexandra, Transvaal; Union of South Africa
- Party: African National Congress
- Spouse: Constance Bapela (died 2018)

Kopeng Obed Bapela (born 28 February 1958) is a South African politician who is currently serving as the Deputy Minister of Public Enterprises since 6 March 2023. Before that, he was Deputy Minister of Cooperative Governance and Traditional Affairs from 2014 to 2023. A member of the African National Congress (ANC), he has been a member of the National Assembly since 2002 and a deputy minister since 2010.

Bapela rose to prominence through the anti-apartheid movement in Alexandra, and he served in the Gauteng Provincial Legislature from 1994 to 1999. After joining Parliament in 2002, he rose to become Chairperson of the National Assembly before President Jacob Zuma appointed him as Deputy Minister of Communications from 2010 to 2011. After that he served as Deputy Minister in the Presidency from 2011 to 2014 and then as Deputy Minister of Cooperative Governance and Traditional Affairs from 2014 until 2023, when President Cyril Ramaphosa appointed him to his current position.

A longstanding member of the ANC, Bapela was formerly Provincial Secretary of the party's Gauteng branch. He has been a member of the ANC National Executive Committee since 2012 and has been particularly active in foreign affairs, including as the party's head of international relations between 2013 and 2015.

== Early life and career ==
Bapela was born on 28 February 1958 in Alexandra, a township outside Johannesburg in the former Transvaal Province. He was the eldest of seven children, with four brothers and two sisters. With their mother and stepfather, they lived in a one-room house in Alexandra, except for a brief period in the late 1960s, when Bapela lived with his grandfather in Ga-Masemola in the Northern Transvaal.

Bapela's first substantive involvement in political organising was during the 1976 Soweto uprising; still in high school, he was involved in the protests in Alexandra and became a student activist in the aftermath. He and other activists were expelled from their school in 1978, but he earned several tertiary certificates and a diploma in journalism. He trained as a cadet reporter at the Weekly Mail, in a cohort of trainees that also included Ferial Haffajee.

At the same time, his involvement in anti-apartheid activism intensified in the early 1980s. In 1979, he joined underground structures of the African National Congress (ANC), which at the time was banned inside South Africa; in his ANC activism, he worked closely with Paul Mashatile and other activists in Alexandra. He was also a member of the Congress of South African Students, and in 1983 he became a founding member both of the Alexandra Youth Congress and of the United Democratic Front. He was later the deputy president of the Alexandra Youth Congress.

In May 1986, he was elected as publicity secretary in the executive of the Alexandra Action Committee, chaired by Moses Mayekiso; his involvement in the committee led to his indictment in the Rand Supreme Court on treason charges, with Bapela, Mayekiso, Richard Mdakane, and two others accused of attempting to render Alexandra "ungovernable". He was detained on several other occasions in the 1980s and remained on trial between 1987 and 1990. The ANC was unbanned in 1990 during the negotiations to end apartheid, and Bapela became involved in the party's newly re-established overt structures, serving as regional secretary of its PWV regional branch from 1991 to 1994.

== Post-apartheid political career ==
In the first post-apartheid elections in April 1994, Bapela was elected to represent the ANC in the Gauteng Provincial Legislature. He served a single term in his seat, leaving in 1999. During the term, he chaired the legislature's portfolio committee on safety and security. In the same period, he was Deputy Provincial Secretary and then Provincial Secretary of the ANC's Gauteng branch.

After that, in 2000, Bapela was assigned to the ANC's headquarters at Luthuli House, where he was the party's coordinator for international relations. He joined the National Assembly in 2002, filling a casual vacancy. He has served continuously in the National Assembly since then: he was elected to a full term in the seat in the 2004 general election and later was appointed as chairperson of the assembly, deputised by Andries Nel. He also remained involved in foreign policy; in 2005, the Mail & Guardian named him one of 100 people who would "shape South Africa in the decade ahead", in his case as "a growing force in foreign affairs".

=== Deputy Minister of Communications: 2010–2011 ===
On 31 October 2010, President Jacob Zuma announced that Bapela would become Deputy Minister of Communications under newly appointed Minister Roy Padayachie. The opposition Congress of the People welcomed his appointment, saying that he had been "highly focused on modernising Parliament" in his former positions.

=== Deputy Minister in the Presidency: 2011–2014 ===
On 24 October 2011, President Zuma announced a major cabinet reshuffle in which Bapela was appointed to succeed Dina Pule as Deputy Minister in the Presidency for Performance Monitoring and Evaluation. He deputised Minister Collins Chabane.

During this period, at the ANC's 53rd National Conference in December 2012, Bapela was elected for the first time to a five-year term as a member of the ANC's National Executive Committee (NEC). According to the Mail & Guardian, he had been "one of the key lobbyists" on Zuma's successful campaign to be re-elected as ANC president at the conference. He was appointed to lead the NEC's subcommittee on international relations, although he held that position for less than three years before he was replaced by Edna Molewa in September 2015. His replacement followed reports that, under his leadership, the subcommittee had contradicted the government's position on certain sensitive issues – such as South Africa's membership of the International Criminal Court – and thus had complicated diplomatic relations.

=== Deputy Minister of COGTA: 2014–2023 ===
Pursuant to the 2014 general election, Bapela was appointed as Deputy Minister of Cooperative Governance and Traditional Affairs in Zuma's second-term cabinet. He was one of two deputy ministers in the portfolio, handling traditional affairs while Andries Nel took responsibility for provincial and local government. He held the office for close to nine years, gaining appointment to the same position in the first and second cabinets of Zuma's successor, President Cyril Ramaphosa.

During this period, Bapela remained in the ANC NEC: he was re-elected to the committee at the party's 54th National Conference in December 2017 (on that occasion as the tenth-most popular candidate) and at its 55th National Conference in December 2022 (as the 37th-most popular candidate). After the 55th National Conference, in early 2023, he was appointed to return to the NEC's subcommittee on international relations, this time as deputy chairperson under Nomvula Mokonyane.

=== Deputy Minister of Public Enterprises: 2023–present ===
Weeks after the 55th National Conference, on 6 March 2023, Ramaphosa announced a cabinet reshuffle which saw Bapela moved to become Deputy Minister of Public Enterprises.

Bapela was given the 96th spot on the ANC's national parliamentary list ahead of the 2024 general election. At the election, the ANC won only 73 seats from the national list, resulting in Bapela losing his seat in the National Assembly.

== Personal life ==
Bapela met his first wife, politician Connie Bapela, in 1981; they had three adult children before she died in February 2018. In October 2019, he announced his engagement to Palesa Ngomane, a civil servant from Mpumalanga.

Bapela's parliamentary residence in Cape Town was burgled in 2005. In February 2016, he was admitted to Milpark Hospital with minor injuries sustained in a car accident on the N12 highway near Fochville, Gauteng.

== See also ==
- History of the African National Congress
- Politics in South Africa
- Provincial governments of South Africa
