= Dina Pule =

South African politician (born 1960)

The Honourable Dina Pule MP
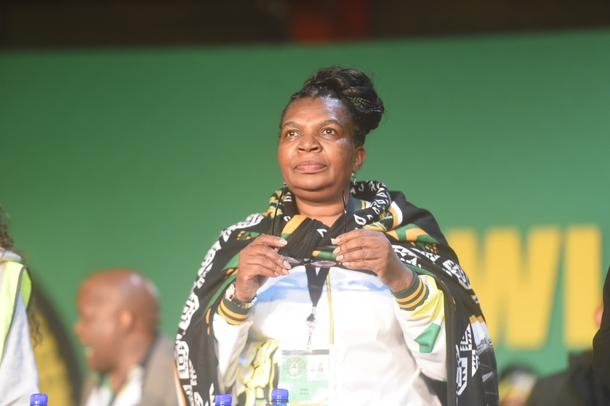
- Pule at the 13th National Conference of the ANC Women's League in July 2023

Minister of Social Development
- Incumbent
- Assumed office 1 July 2026
- President: Cyril Ramaphosa
- Preceded by: Sindisiwe Chikunga (acting); Sisisi Tolashe

Member of the National Assembly
- Incumbent
- Assumed office 14 June 2024
- In office 6 May 2009 – 6 May 2014

Deputy Secretary-General of the African National Congress Women's League
- Incumbent
- Assumed office 23 July 2023
- President: Sisi Tolashe
- Secretary-General: Nokuthula Nqaba
- Preceded by: Weziwe Tikana

Minister of Communications
- In office 24 October 2011 – 9 July 2013
- President: Jacob Zuma
- Preceded by: Roy Padayachie
- Succeeded by: Yunus Carrim

Member of the Mpumalanga Executive Council for Agriculture and Land Administration
- In office 13 February 2007 – 14 May 2008
- Premier: Thabang Makwetla
- Succeeded by: David Mabuza

Personal details
- Born: 19 July 1960 (age 66) Hazyview, Transvaal; Union of South Africa
- Party: African National Congress
- Education: University of South Africa

Dina Deliwe Pule (born 19 July 1960) is a South African politician who has been the Minister of Social Development since July 2026. She represents the African National Congress (ANC) in the National Assembly of South Africa. She has been the Deputy Secretary-General of the ANC Women's League since July 2023. Before that, she was Minister of Communications under President Jacob Zuma from October 2011 to July 2013.

Born in Mpumalanga, Pule first held public office as a member of the Mpumalanga Provincial Legislature for a single term between 2004 and 2009. During that period, she held several portfolios as a Member of the Executive Council under former Premier Thabang Makwetla. After her election to the National Assembly in 2009, she served under Zuma as Deputy Minister of Communications from 2009 to 2010 and Deputy Minister in the Presidency for Performance Monitoring and Evaluation from 2010 to 2011, before being appointed to Zuma's cabinet in 2011.

She was fired from the cabinet in July 2013 during a parliamentary inquiry into allegations that she had contravened the parliamentary code of conduct. The allegations were ultimately substantiated by Parliament's Joint Committee on Ethics and Members' Interests and by the Public Protector, leading Parliament to suspend and reprimand Pule. After this misconduct finding, Pule declined to stand for re-election as an ordinary Member of Parliament in the 2014 general election.

At the ANC's 55th National Conference in December 2022, Pule was elected to a five-year term as a member of the ANC National Executive Committee. She had previously served on the committee between 2007 and 2012. Thereafter, she returned to the National Assembly in the 2024 general election. In a cabinet reshuffle in June 2026, president Cyril Ramaphosa appointed her as the Minister of Social Development.

== Early life and career ==
Pule was born on 19 July 1960 in a village on the outskirts of Hazyview in the former the Eastern Transvaal (now Mpumalanga province). She attended Elijah Mango College of Education in Nelspruit from 1987 to 1989, where she trained as a secondary school teacher; while there, she served on the student representative council (first as secretary and then as deputy president) and as a founding member of the anti-apartheid South African National Students Congress. In addition to her teaching diploma, Pule subsequently received a Bachelor of Arts degree in communications from the University of South Africa.

In 1990 and 1991, while working as a teacher, Pule was a founding member of the Eastern Transvaal Women's Union and the secretary of a local branch of the South African Democratic Teachers' Union (SADTU). From 1991 to 1993, she was Provincial Treasurer of the Mpumalanga branch of SADTU. At the same time, Pule became active in structures of the African National Congress (ANC), which was unbanned by the apartheid government in 1990: from 1990 to 1991, she was the Provincial Secretary of the ANC Women's League in Mpumalanga and a regional leader of the ANC Youth League in the region.

She joined the post-apartheid government as a public servant in 1996, when she was appointed community liaison officer at the health department in the provincial government of Mpumalanga. The following year, she was elected secretary of her local ANC branch in Nelspruit. She held that position until 1999, when she was elected chairperson of the local branch of the ANC Women's League in Nelspruit. In 2001, Pule ascended a rung in the ANC hierarchy when she was elected deputy secretary of the ANC's entire Ehlanzeni region; she held that position until 2004.

== Provincial government: 2004–2009 ==
In the 2004 general election, Pule was elected as a Member of the Mpumalanga Provincial Legislature. In 2005, she was appointed as a Member of the Executive Council (MEC) in Mpumalanga by Thabang Makwetla, who was then the Premier of Mpumalanga. She was MEC for Safety and Security until February 2007, when – in what was viewed as a promotion for Pule – she was moved to the Agriculture and Land Administration portfolio in a reshuffle by Makwetla. In a subsequent reshuffle in May 2008, she succeeded Jabu Mahlangu as MEC for Culture, Sport and Recreation. In that capacity, she chaired the Mpumalanga government's political task team ahead of the 2010 Soccer World Cup.

Over the same period, Pule continued to rise in the ranks of the provincial ANC. She was Chairperson of the ANC's Ehlanzeni region from 2004 to 2007 and in June 2005 she was elected as a three-year term as Deputy Provincial Secretary of the Mpumalanga ANC, serving under Provincial Secretary Lucas Mello. Towards the end of her term as Deputy Provincial Secretary, at the ANC's 52nd National Conference in December 2007, Pule was elected to a five-year term on the ANC National Executive Committee. She was also elected to the party's National Working Committee.

== National government: 2009–2013 ==
=== Deputy Minister: 2009–2011 ===
In the 2009 general election, Pule was elected as a Member of the National Assembly, the lower house of South Africa's national Parliament. Newly elected President Jacob Zuma appointed her Deputy Minister of Communications under Minister Siphiwe Nyanda. In a subsequent reshuffle on 31 October 2010, she became Deputy Minister in the Presidency for Performance Monitoring and Evaluation under Minister Collins Chabane.

=== Minister of Communications: 2011–2013 ===
On 24 October 2011, Zuma appointed Pule to succeed Roy Padayachie as Minister of Communications in his cabinet. According to News24, Pule was the first post-apartheid cabinet minister from Mpumalanga.

During Pule's tenure as Minister, her term on the ANC National Executive Committee expired, and she was not re-elected at the next party elective conference in December 2012. More significantly, Pule was subject to public controversy surrounding allegations that she had abused her public office. On 9 July 2013, while an investigation into the allegations was ongoing, Zuma fired Pule and replaced her with Yunus Carrim.

The so-called Gupta Leaks, published in 2017 after Pule had left government, appeared to suggest that Pule, while still a Minister, had met the controversial Gupta family at their home in Saxonwold in October 2012.

== Misconduct finding: 2013 ==
The misconduct allegations against Pule stemmed from her romantic relationship with Phosane Mngqibisa, a businessman who was alleged to have received improper benefits as a result of his relationship with Pule. In response, Pule initiated a public spat with the Sunday Times, which had reported the initial allegations against her, according to her as part of a political conspiracy. She denied continuously that she had a relationship with Mngqibisa or that his trips abroad had been subsidised by the government.

=== Parliamentary inquiry ===
The allegations were investigated by a nine-member multi-party panel appointed by Parliament's Joint Committee on Ethics and Members' Interests. The chairperson of the panel, Ben Turok of the ANC, later said that he and the committee's registrar had both been assigned bodyguards during the inquiry because they had received death threats; Turok also said that witnesses at the inquiry had been bullied to change their testimony.

==== Findings ====
On 7 August, the panel released its findings, which affirmed most of the allegations against Pule. The panel found that Pule had contravened the parliamentary code of conduct by concealing her relationship with Mngqibisa, which it said appeared to have begun in 2009 while Pule was Deputy Minister of Communications, and that Mngqibisa, "through Hon. Pule's influence, benefited improperly by receiving R6-million for his company and enjoyed the benefit of the DOC [Department of Communications] paying for his overseas trips and accommodation". Mngqibisa had received the R6 million through his company during MTN's 2012 ICT Indaba. However, the panel did not find sufficient evidence to substantiate the Sunday Times's further claim that Pule had received, and had failed to disclose, a gift from Mngqibisa (allegedly a pair of Christian Louboutin shoes).

==== Sanctions ====
In addition to recommending that Pule should be subject to a criminal investigation, the parliamentary committee recommended that Pule should be subject to the harshest sanctions permitted by the parliamentary rules: a public reprimand in the National Assembly, a fine equivalent to 30 days' salary, and 15 days' suspension from the assembly. The recommendations were accepted by the assembly and the sanctions were applied later in August. Following her public reprimand by Speaker of the National Assembly Max Sisulu, Pule offered what the Mail & Guardian called "a qualified apology": she said, "I want to say in this House that I gave the best I could do to do my job; and that if in the course of me doing my job, if I made a mistake I am sorry, I apologise".

=== Public Protector report ===
The allegations were also investigated by the Public Protector, Thuli Madonsela, who concurred with the parliamentary inquiry in finding Pule guilty of misconduct and of "persistently lying". Madonsela's report, released in 2013, found that Pule's conduct had been unlawful; Madonsela added that it was "grossly improper and unethical that she tried to pass the buck to her staff". She recommended that Pule should apologise to Parliament, to the Department of Communications, and to the Sunday Times, and that the department should be reimbursed fully for the money spent on Mngqibisa's travel.

== Later offices ==
After being subject to dismissal and punishment, Pule completed her term as an ordinary member of the National Assembly. Controversially, in the 2014 general election, she was again included on the ANC's party list. Although she was ranked high enough (70th) to secure a seat, she withdrew her name from the party list and retreated from frontline politics.

In 2019, City Press reported that Pule was "set for a big comeback" in provincial politics as a contender for election as Provincial Chairperson of the Mpumalanga ANC. According to the newspaper, Pule's supporters also supported the election of Lindiwe Ntshalintshali, Mandla Ndlovu, Pat Ngomane, and Vusi Shongwe to top positions in the provincial party. However, the party's elective conference was delayed due to the COVID-19 pandemic; when it was finally held in 2022, Pule did not contest a top position.

In August 2021, Pule was appointed to a four-year term as deputy chairperson of the Mpumalanga Economic Growth Agency, a public entity. The following month, the Mpumalanga ANC appointed her as one of three members of an internal panel that was tasked with resolving disputes about the selection of ANC candidates for the 2021 local government elections. By that time, Pule was also a full-time staff member of the ANC in Mpumalanga.

=== ANC Women's League ===
In 2022, Pule was appointed to the interim task team formed to lead the national ANC Women's League after the league's elected leadership, headed by Bathabile Dlamini, was disbanded. At the ANC's 55th National Conference in December 2022, she was additionally elected to a five-year term on the ANC National Executive Committee. She was ranked 67th of the 80 candidates elected to the committee by the number of votes received.

The ANC Women's League held its 13th National Conference in July 2023, and Pule was nominated from the floor of the conference to stand for election as the league's Deputy Secretary-General. She was elected to the office on 23 July, deputising Nokuthula Nqaba.

=== Return to Parliament and national government: 2024–present ===
Amid the ANC experiencing a decline in electoral support in the May 2024 general election, Pule was elected to return to an ANC seat in the National Assembly. During a cabinet reshuffle on 30 June 2026, president Cyril Ramaphosa appointed her as the Minister of Social Development. She was sworn in the following day.
