= Roy Padayachie =

South African politician and activist (1950–2012)

Minister of Public Service and Administration
- In office 24 October 2011 – 5 May 2012
- President: Jacob Zuma
- Deputy: Ayanda Dlodlo
- Preceded by: Richard Baloyi
- Succeeded by: Lindiwe Sisulu

Minister of Communications
- In office 1 November 2010 – 24 October 2011
- President: Jacob Zuma
- Deputy: Obed Bapela
- Preceded by: Siphiwe Nyanda
- Succeeded by: Dina Pule

Deputy Minister of Public Service and Administration
- In office 11 May 2009 – 30 October 2010
- President: Jacob Zuma
- Minister: Richard Baloyi
- Preceded by: Position established
- Succeeded by: Ayanda Dlodlo

Deputy Minister of Communications
- In office 29 April 2004 – 10 May 2009
- President: Jacob Zuma; Kgalema Motlanthe
- Minister: Ivy Matsepe-Casaburri
- Succeeded by: Dina Pule

Member of the National Assembly
- In office 23 April 2004 – 5 May 2012

Personal details
- Born: Radhakrishna Lutchmana Padayachie; 1 May 1950 Clairwood, Durban; Natal, Union of South Africa
- Died: 5 May 2012 (aged 62) Addis Ababa, Ethiopia
- Party: African National Congress
- Spouse: Sally Padayachie
- Education: University of Durban-Westville; University of London

Radhakrishna Lutchmana "Roy" Padayachie (1 May 1950 – 5 May 2012) was a South African politician and activist. He was a cabinet minister between November 2010 and his death in May 2012. At the same time he represented the African National Congress (ANC) in the National Assembly between April 2004 and May 2012.

Born and raised in Durban, Padayachie worked as a chemist from 1974 to 1980, as a community organiser in Chatsworth from 1980 to 1999, and as a business consultant from 1999 to 2004. Throughout that time he was prominent in civic and political activism in Durban; as an anti-apartheid activist, he served in leadership positions in the Natal Indian Congress and United Democratic Front. He joined the ANC underground in 1972.

Padayachie joined the National Assembly in the April 2004 general election and served as Deputy Minister of Communications until May 2009 under Presidents Thabo Mbeki and Kgalema Motlanthe. Under President Jacob Zuma, he served as Deputy Minister of Public Service and Administration from May 2009 to October 2010 before being elevated to Zuma's cabinet. He was Minister of Communications from November 2010 to October 2011 and then was Minister of Public Service and Administration from October 2011 to May 2012. He died in office on an official visit to Addis Ababa.

== Early life and education ==
Radhakrishna Lutchmana Padayachie, known as "Roy", was born on 1 May 1950 in Clairwood on the outskirts of Durban in the former Natal Province. His great-grandfather was a Tamil emigrant from the village of Ooramangalam near Chennai; his grandparents were born in Mauritius and his parents in South Africa.

Classified as Indian under apartheid, he attended the Tagore High School in Clairwood and went on to the University of Durban–Westville, where he completed a Bachelor of Science. He later completed a Master of Science at the University of London.

== Early career and activism ==
Between 1974 and 1980, Padayachie worked as a chemist: he was a formulations chemist at paint company Plascon Evans until 1976, then a microbiologist at Reckitt and Colman until 1979, and finally a research chemist at Shell Chemical until 1980. Between 1980 and 1999 he worked in community development and organising, primarily in the Durban suburb of Chatsworth, where he established the Chatsworth Early Learning Centre.

Meanwhile, he was a prominent figure in the anti-apartheid movement in Natal, particularly in the Natal Indian Congress, where he served in the executive leadership. He joined the underground of the African National Congress (ANC) in 1972. He was also active in the Housing Action Committee in Chatsworth and the Residents' Association in Croftdene, and after the United Democratic Front was formed in 1983 he joined its provincial executive committee in Natal.

During the negotiations to end apartheid, Padayachie was a member of the ANC's Natal delegation to the Convention for a Democratic South Africa. After the first democratic elections in 1994, he started a business consultancy, advising small, medium and micro enterprises. He continued that business until he was appointed to government in 2004. By 2004 he had interests in a number of companies. At the same time, he was a member of the policy advisory group on the establishment of the National Development Agency, and he also served as the spokesperson for the Community Distress Committee formed in the aftermath of the 2000 Throb nightclub disaster in Chatsworth.

== Political career ==
=== Deputy Minister of Communications: 2004–2009 ===
In the April 2004 general election, Padayachie was elected to represent the ANC in the National Assembly, the lower house of the South African Parliament. In the aftermath of the election, President Thabo Mbeki appointed Padayachie as Deputy Minister of Communications under Minister Ivy Matsepe-Casaburri.

The Mail & Guardian referred to him as "the great unknown" among Mbeki's new appointments, given his relative paucity of experience in frontline politics. Indeed, Minister Matsepe-Casaburri reportedly did not recognise his full name in the cabinet announcement; he had to be re-introduced as comrade Roy. He served in the deputy ministerial portfolio throughout the Third Parliament, gaining re-appointment when Kgalema Motlanthe replaced Mbeki in a midterm presidential election.

=== Deputy Minister of Public Service: 2009–2010 ===
Padayachie was re-elected to the National Assembly in the April 2009 general election. Announcing his first-term cabinet on 10 May, President Jacob Zuma moved Padayachie to the post of Deputy Minister of Public Service and Administration, in which capacity he deputised Minister Richard Baloyi. As in his prior position, he "played a background role" in the ministry.

=== Minister of Communications: 2010–2011 ===
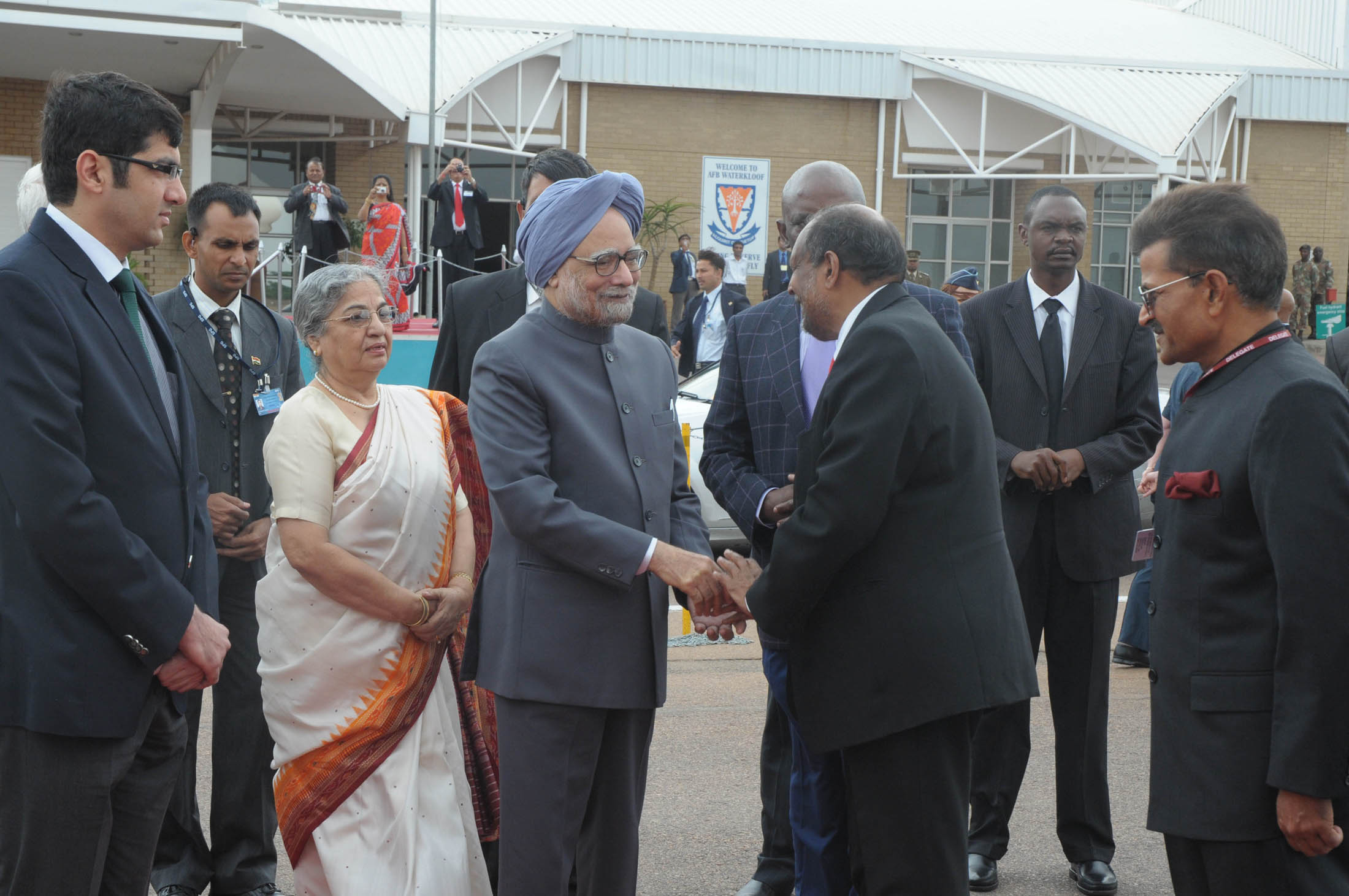
Padayachie with Indian Prime Minister Manmohan Singh and his wife Gursharan Kaur in Pretoria on 19 October 2011

Padayachie was in the Ministry of Public Service and Administration for less than two years before Zuma promoted him to the cabinet in a reshuffle on 31 October 2010. He replaced Siphiwe Nyanda as Minister of Communications, with Obed Bapela as his deputy. His return to the Ministry of Communications was generally welcomed in the private sector, and the Mail & Guardian noted that, with his prior experience in the portfolio, he was prepared to "hit the ground running". Even before he was sworn in to the ministry, he told press that his priority would be "to intervene on the issue of the SABC board because the people deserve a public broadcaster that is functioning".

Upon taking office, Padayachie's first task was to appoint a new director-general in the Department of Communications, as the incumbent had been sacked by his predecessor. Within three weeks in office, he withdrew the draft Public Service Broadcasting Bill from Parliament, pending a policy review and further consultation; the move was welcomed both by Media Monitoring Africa and by the opposition Democratic Alliance. In the next two months he announced that South Africa would adopt the DVB-T2 digital television standard, complete its digital migration by December 2012, and complete Telkom's local loop unbundling by November 2012, though neither of the latter targets were met. Padayachie nonetheless remained well respected in the communications industry.

==== Phil Molefe appointment ====
In July 2011, Padayachie was accused of undue political interference in the governance of the SABC after he called a shareholders' meeting to encourage the board to amend the SABC's articles of association. The amendments allowed the board to appoint any SABC employee to top management positions, facilitating the appointment of the SABC's head of news, Phil Molefe, as acting chief executive officer. Board member Peter Harris resigned in protest of the intervention. Padayachie said that the intervention was not intended to facilitate Molefe's appointment but conversely was intended to give the board greater discretion in choosing among potential candidates for the top job.

==== Alleged Gupta influence ====
After Padayachie's death, media and public inquiries unearthed indications that Zuma's presidency was characterised by the capture of certain state institutions by Zuma's allies in the Gupta family. In September 2018, in a front-page story, the Sunday Times printed the hypothesis that Padayachie had been appointed to the Ministry of Communications in order to facilitate the Guptas' access to the communications sector, particularly the SABC. Padayachie's predecessor, Siphiwe Nyanda, said that he had been fired from the post after he refused to meet with the Guptas. and the newspaper said that as minister Padayachie had "given special recognition" to the Guptas and their company, Sahara Computers. Calling Padayachie "a close ally" of the Gupta family, the newspaper also claimed that it was under Padayachie that Hlaudi Motsoeneng, a notorious Gupta supporter, had begun his ascent at the SABC and had signed favourable contracts between the SABC and the Guptas' New Age newspaper.

Notwithstanding the lack of conclusive evidence against Padayachie, the Sunday Times story was met with disappointment from Padayachie's supporters.

=== Minister of Public Service: 2011–2012 ===
Less than a year after Padayachie's appointment to the Ministry of Communications, Zuma announced another reshuffle on 24 October 2011. Padayachie was appointed as Minister of Public Service and Administration, replacing his former boss, Richard Baloyi. His deputy was Ayanda Dlodlo. In early 2012 he announced that, in the following year, his department would seek to put in place a framework for the establishment of a single public service.

== Death and personal life ==
On 4 May 2012, Padayachie died of a heart attack in a hotel room in Addis Ababa, Ethiopia. He had been in Ethiopia on official business, attending a high-level meeting on the African Peer Review Mechanism. The Presidency announced that he would have a category-one official funeral. The funeral was held on 9 May at Sahara Kingsmead Stadium in Durban; the eulogy was delivered by President Zuma, who had known him since they met in the anti-apartheid movement in December 1973. His remains were cremated at Clare Estate in Durban.

He was married to Sally Padayachie, whom he had spoken to on the telephone shortly before his death, and he had two daughters.
