= Zizi Kodwa =

South African politician (born 1970)

The Honourable Zizi Kodwa MP

Minister of Sports, Arts and Culture
- In office 7 March 2023 – 5 June 2024
- President: Cyril Ramaphosa
- Deputy: Nocawe Mafu
- Preceded by: Nathi Mthethwa
- Succeeded by: Gayton McKenzie

Member of the National Assembly
- In office 22 May 2019 – 24 July 2024
- In office 21 May 2014 – 26 May 2014

Deputy Minister in the Presidency for State Security
- In office 5 August 2021 – 6 March 2023
- President: Cyril Ramaphosa
- Minister: Mondli Gungubele
- Preceded by: Himself (for State Security)
- Succeeded by: Kenny Morolong; Nomasonto Motaung

Deputy Minister of State Security
- In office 30 May 2019 – 5 August 2021
- President: Cyril Ramaphosa
- Minister: Ayanda Dlodlo
- Preceded by: Ellen Molekane
- Succeeded by: Himself (in the Presidency)

National Spokesperson of the African National Congress
- In office 26 May 2014 – 6 February 2018
- President: Jacob Zuma; Cyril Ramaphosa
- Preceded by: Jackson Mthembu
- Succeeded by: Pule Mabe

Personal details
- Born: Ncediso Goodenough Kodwa; 19 January 1970 (age 56) Gugulethu, Cape Province; South Africa
- Party: African National Congress
- Spouse: Zama Ngubane (m. 2011)
- Education: University of the Western Cape

Ncediso Goodenough "Zizi" Kodwa (born 19 January 1970) is a South African politician and communications strategist who served as the Minister of Sports, Arts and Culture from March 2023 until his resignation in June 2024. Before that, he was the Deputy Minister of State Security from 2019 to 2023. He was formerly the national spokesperson of the African National Congress (ANC) from 2014 to 2018.

Formerly a student activist in Cape Town, Kodwa rose to prominence as the national spokesperson of the ANC Youth League. He held that office during the tenure of league president Fikile Mbalula, and he, like Mbalula, was an outspoken supporter of Jacob Zuma. After Zuma was elected as ANC president in December 2007, Kodwa was the spokesman in Zuma's party office; from 2010 to 2012, he was also Zuma's special advisor on communications in the Presidency of South Africa. After that, for most of Zuma's second term as president, Kodwa was the ANC's national spokesperson from May 2014 to February 2018.

From 2018 to 2019, he was briefly the head of the ANC presidential office under Zuma's successor, President Cyril Ramaphosa. He joined the National Assembly in the 2019 general election – following an earlier, week-long tenure in the assembly in May 2014 – and was appointed by Ramaphosa to as Deputy Minister of State Security. He retained the state security position after it was restructured and renamed as Deputy Minister in the Presidency for State Security in 2021, and he was appointed to a cabinet position in a reshuffle in March 2023.

In addition to his various communications posts at Luthuli House, Kodwa has been a member of the ANC National Executive Committee since December 2012.

== Early life and education ==
Kodwa was born on 19 January 1970 in Gugulethu outside Cape Town in the former Cape Province. He was the youngest of six siblings born to a single mother, Esther Kodwa, who was a domestic worker.

He was active in the Congress of South African Students in his youth. Later, as a student at the University of the Western Cape, he joined the South African Students Congress and also served as president of the student representative council. He graduated from the university with a Bachelor of Arts and Honours in development studies.

== ANC Youth League ==
By the time of his graduation, Kodwa's work in the students' movement had attracted the attention of the ANC Youth League. He rose through the ranks of the league in the Western Cape, working meanwhile as a marketing manager for Denel's pyrotechnics division (Swartklip). Later, he was recruited to work in a communications role for the ANC Youth League's president, Malusi Gigaba. Under Gigaba's successor, Fikile Mbalula, he was the ANC Youth League's national spokesperson. He was also elected to the league's National Executive Committee.

During this period, Kodwa and Mbalula together rose to prominence as vocal supporters of Jacob Zuma, who was ousted as Deputy President of South Africa in 2005 and who became the major political rival to President Thabo Mbeki. During Zuma's rape trial in 2006, Kodwa frequently appeared at pro-Zuma political rallies outside the Johannesburg High Court. He attracted particular public attention for encouraging Zuma's supporters to "hit the dog until the owner comes out", an allusion to alleged political interference in Zuma's prosecution. Kodwa later said that the ANC Youth League had often used "hyperbole and exaggeration" to communicate its messages, but conceded that "in 2018, I would not use that type of language".

Kodwa's support for Zuma continued during Zuma's bid to be elected as ANC president at the party's 52nd National Conference, held in Polokwane in 2007. Indeed, the Mail & Guardian described Kodwa and Mbalula as Zuma's "chief propagandist[s]" ahead of the conference.

== Presidency of South Africa ==
In the aftermath of the Polokwane conference, Kodwa worked for Zuma in the ANC, managing the office of the ANC president and acting as the office's spokesperson. He continued in this role during the 2009 general election campaign and after Zuma was elected as President of South Africa in May 2009. On 16 March 2010, he was appointed as a special adviser on communications to Zuma in Zuma's government office, the Presidency of South Africa. It was proposed that, by taking on an additional advisory role at the Union Buildings, Kodwa would be able to coordinate between Zuma's government office and his ANC office at Luthuli House. More directly, Kodwa was believed to have been recruited to help restore Zuma's image following a sex scandal.

In mid-2010, Zuma's official government spokesman, Vincent Magwenya, resigned amid reports that he had clashed with Kodwa. Thereafter, Kodwa acted as Zuma's government spokesman too. However, in July 2011, Mac Maharaj was abruptly appointed as the spokesman in the Presidency. Although Kodwa said that he had been hired as an adviser and had only been acting temporarily as spokesman, Maharaj's appointment was perceived as a snub to Kodwa, perhaps motivated by suspicion of Kodwa's continued closeness with his former ANC Youth League comrades, Fikile Mbalula and Julius Malema.

In June 2012, Kodwa left the Presidency altogether to take up a position as a communications and marketing manager at the Gauteng Film Commission. There remained reports that his relationship with Zuma had been harmed by his ties to Mbalula and Malema, who were increasingly hostile towards Zuma.

In December 2012, at the ANC's 53rd National Conference in Mangaung, Kodwa was elected for the first time to a five-year term as a member of the ANC's National Executive Committee; by number of votes received, he was the 23rd-most popular candidate of the 80 ordinary members elected to the committee.

== Luthuli House ==
=== National spokesperson: 2014–2018 ===
In the May 2014 general election, Kodwa stood as a candidate for the ANC, ranked 22nd on the party's national party list, and gained election to a seat in the National Assembly. However, on 26 May 2014, the ANC announced that Kodwa would become the party's national spokesperson. He replaced Jackson Mthembu, who had also joined the National Assembly. Later the same day, Kodwa resigned from his parliamentary seat in order to work full-time from the ANC's headquarters at Luthuli House in Johannesburg. He later said that his abrupt transfer from the National Assembly to Luthuli House taught him "that you don't make your own decisions in the ANC."

He remained in the spokesman position, working under ANC secretary-general Gwede Mantashe, until after the ANC's next elective conference, the 54th National Conference held in December 2017 at Nasrec. At the conference, Kodwa openly endorsed Cyril Ramaphosa's successful bid to succeed Zuma as ANC president, and Kodwa was himself re-elected to the ANC National Executive Committee, ranked eighth among the 80 ordinary members elected. During the proceedings, Kodwa told the press:

The worst punishment the ANC can give me now is to say I must be a spokesperson of the ANC again. It's better to leave the stage when everybody says we want more. If you stay too long you may commit serious mistakes.

On switching allegiances from Zuma to Ramaphosa, Kodwa said in early 2018:

I don't have what is called blind loyalty. I don't worship an individual... I knew that Zuma was not coming back in Nasrec. Then in my mind I was very clear that we needed somebody who will take over. And I realised that Matamela [Ramaphosa] is the only person who can take over. He is the kind of leadership that the ANC needs at this current moment.

=== Head of presidency: 2018–2019 ===
In the aftermath of the 54th National Conference, Kodwa was elected to the influential National Working Committee and appointed to a different full-time position at Luthuli House, this time as the head of the office of the ANC president. Pule Mabe succeeded him as national spokesman.

When Mabe was accused of sexual harassment in December 2018 and temporarily stepped aside as spokesman, Kodwa returned to his earlier role in an acting capacity. However, in February 2019, he too stepped aside from the spokesman role after separate allegations were laid against him: a woman had written to the ANC to claim that Kodwa had drugged and raped her at a private event in a Sandton hotel in April 2018. ANC deputy secretary-general Jessie Duarte said that the woman had been advised to seek recourse through the criminal justice system, and Kodwa strongly denied the woman's allegation, describing it as part of a "feeble yet dangerous attempt at political blackmail and manipulation". In May 2019, the woman withdrew her complaint against Kodwa, saying that the public discussion of her case had "caused immeasurable damage to me, my family and no doubt to Mr Kodwa".

== National government ==
=== Deputy Minister of State Security: 2019–2023 ===
Pursuant to the next general election in 2019, Kodwa was again elected to an ANC seat in the National Assembly. In addition, Ramaphosa – who was re-elected as President of South Africa – appointed him as Deputy Minister of State Security under Minister Ayanda Dlodlo. Sibongile Besani was therefore appointed to replace Kodwa as head of the ANC presidency. By then, Kodwa was viewed as "one of President Ramaphosa's most trusted lieutenants".

==== 2021 civil unrest ====
Kodwa was in the Ministry of State Security during the civil unrest of July 2021, which Kodwa described as a "well-coordinated and planned attack to cripple the state"; Minister Dlodlo's messaging about the unrest was markedly more pacific. In the aftermath, in August 2021, Ramaphosa restructured the state security forces: the Ministry of State Security was absorbed into the Presidency, and responsibility for the State Security Agency was designated to the Minister in the Presidency. Mondli Gungubele was appointed as that Minister, and Kodwa became Gungubele's deputy, retaining his state security portfolio.

==== Zondo Commission findings ====
In 2021, Kodwa was summoned to testified before the Zondo Commission, established to investigate allegations of state capture during Zuma's presidency. At the commission, he was questioned about his relationship to a private technology company, EOH, and its employees; in particular, Kodwa had received in 2015, and had not yet repaid, a R1-million loan from a former EOH executive. According to the final report of the Zondo Commission, published in 2022, Kodwa was paid an aggregate amount of R1.68 million by EOH and related agents between 2014 and 2015. The head of the commission, Justice Raymond Zondo, concluded in the commission's report that EOH executives had attempted to "induce [Kodwa] to interfere with procurement processes in the interests of EOH", but he also noted that there was no evidence of improprieties by Kodwa, given that he had been the ANC spokesman – not a public employee – at the time the payments were made.

However, the commission recommended that EOH should be investigated and prosecuted for its role in tender fraud and for its improper relationships with ANC politicians, including former Johannesburg Mayor Geoff Makhubo. On this basis, Zondo recommended that President Ramaphosa should "consider" Kodwa's position at the Ministry of State Security. According to Zondo:

It would not be difficult for an influential or important figure in a political party that is the majority party in a municipality to influence either officials within such a municipality or councillors to influence relevant officials. This point is made here in general and not necessarily suggesting that the commission is aware of any evidence that Mr Kodwa did not influence anybody to do anything improper or unlawful... However, as Deputy Minister for State Security, Mr Kodwa now finds himself in an impossible position. Mr Kodwa is beholden to [former EOH executive] Mr Jehan Mackay to whom he owes more than R1.7-million... It is untenable for the deputy minister of state security to find himself in a position where he is beholden to a suspect in multiple criminal investigations.

==== 55th National Conference ====
At the ANC's 55th National Conference in December 2022, Kodwa was re-elected to the ANC National Executive Committee, now ranked ninth of 80, and was also re-elected to the National Working Committee. After the conference, he was appointed as the committee's deployee to KwaZulu-Natal.

=== Minister of Sports, Arts and Culture: 2023–2024 ===
Weeks after the 55th National Conference, on 6 March 2023, President Ramaphosa announced a cabinet reshuffle in which Kodwa was appointed as Minister of Sports, Arts and Culture, replacing Nathi Mthethwa. The reshuffle followed rumours that Fikile Mbalula had been lobbying for Kodwa to succeed him as Minister of Transport, a more senior portfolio than Sports, Arts and Culture.

== Corruption ==
On 4 June 2024, Kodwa was arrested for allegedly receiving R1.6 million in bribes. The Hawks arrested Kodwa based on recommendations of the Zondo Commission. In 2016, contracts worth R460 million were given by the City of Johannesburg Metropolitan Municipality to EOH Holdings to facilitate the upgrade of the metro's software systems. In October 2024, Kodwa applied for the corruption charges against him to be withdrawn, claiming that the state has a weak case. Zizi Kodwa's charges were dropped and he was released.

== Personal life ==
Kodwa married Zama Ngubane at the Durban Botanic Gardens in December 2011. He is known for his penchant for silk cravats, and in early 2010 he celebrated his 40th birthday with a sequence of four large parties over two weeks.

In the early hours of 11 November 2011, Kodwa was arrested in Rosebank on suspicion of drunk driving. He was charged and released on bail, but he said that he intended to fight the charge and sue for wrongful arrest, arguing that he had been arrested because he had refused to pay a bribe. In December, the results of the police's blood-alcohol content testing were released, showing that Kodwa had not been drinking; the charges against him were dropped.
