= Faith Muthambi =

South African politician

The Honourable Faith Muthambi MP

Member of the National Assembly
- Incumbent
- Assumed office 14 June 2024
- In office 6 May 2009 – 28 November 2022
- Constituency: Limpopo (2009–2014)

Minister of Public Service and Administration
- In office 31 March 2017 – 26 February 2018
- President: Jacob Zuma; Cyril Ramaphosa
- Deputy: Dipuo Letsatsi-Duba
- Preceded by: Ngoako Ramatlhodi
- Succeeded by: Ayanda Dlodlo

Minister of Communications
- In office 26 May 2014 – 31 March 2017
- President: Jacob Zuma
- Deputy: Stella Ndabeni-Abrahams
- Preceded by: Yunus Carrim
- Succeeded by: Ayanda Dlodlo

Personal details
- Born: Azwihangwisi Faith Muthambi; 19 February 1974 (age 52)
- Citizenship: South Africa
- Party: African National Congress
- Education: University of Venda

Azwihangwisi Faith Muthambi (born 19 February 1974) is a South African politician who represents the African National Congress (ANC) in the National Assembly of South Africa. She was formerly the Minister of Public Service and Administration and Minister of Communications under President Jacob Zuma. She returned to the National Assembly in June 2024 after serving a prior stint in her seat between 2009 and 2022.

Muthambi is an admitted attorney of the High Court of South Africa and formerly held various positions in the civil service in Limpopo, most proximately as the municipal manager of Makhado Local Municipality from 2004 to 2009. She joined the National Assembly in the April 2009 general election and spent five years as a backbencher before she was appointed as Minister of Communications in Zuma's second-term cabinet.

She led the communications ministry between May 2014 and March 2017, and later she was Minister of Public Service and Administration from March 2017 to February 2018. Her tenure as a minister was controversial due to her apparent links to the Gupta family, and the Zondo Commission labelled her "a Gupta minister" and referred her for prosecution on corruption charges.

After she was sacked from the cabinet by President Cyril Ramaphosa in February 2018, Muthambi served stints as chairperson of the Portfolio Committee on Cooperative Governance and Traditional Affairs and Portfolio Committee on Environment, Forestry and Fisheries. She resigned from Parliament on 28 November 2022 but returned in the next general election in May 2024. In December 2022, she was elected to her second consecutive five-year term as a member of the ANC's National Executive Committee.

== Early life and education ==
Muthambi was born on 19 February 1974. She was a student activist as a teenager, first in the South African National Students Congress between 1989 and 1990 and then, after the African National Congress (ANC) was unbanned in 1990, through the ANC Youth League. She was the secretary of the league's branch in Tshimbupfe in the former Northern Transvaal (present-day Limpopo) from 1991 to 1992, and she joined the branch executive committee of the mainstream ANC in Tshimbupfe in 1992.

From 1993 to 1996, she was a student at the University of Venda, during which time she continued to rise through the ANC's ranks, gaining election as deputy secretary of the ANC branch in the Vuwani zone. She graduated with a BProc in 1996.

== Early career ==
Muthambi was admitted as an attorney of the High Court of South Africa in 2000. She worked as manager for labour relations in the office of the Premier of Limpopo and as a legal adviser and then manager in various municipalities in Limpopo. Most proximately, she worked at Makhado Local Municipality, where she was the director of the municipal secretariat until July 2004, when she was appointed as acting municipal manager after the incumbent was suspended on corruption charges. She was later appointed to the position permanently, becoming the first woman to hold the job. After some political wrangling, her contract was extended by five years in November 2007.

=== Suspension as municipal manager ===
Her tenure as municipal manager was controversial. Less than a year into her term, on 26 May 2005, she was arrested by the Serious Economic Crime Unit on charges of fraud in relation to the sale of a luxury vehicle. She denied the charges, and they were withdrawn on 1 July. In April 2008, members of the South African Municipal Workers' Union (SAMWU) held a protest demanding Muthambi's immediate suspension; the union accused her of nepotism and corruption, among other things in a municipal construction tender awarded to the company of Stanley Radzilani, who allegedly had a close friendship with Muthambi and who was allegedly overpaid for shoddy work. Following further protests and an internal investigation, during which Muthambi took special leave, she was suspended at the end of June 2008. A municipal spokesperson said that Radzilani appeared to be "a boyfriend of some sort", which Muthambi denied, and also said that she was under investigation for nepotism for having allegedly appointed her cousin as a municipal librarian without any job interview. Muthambi said that her suspension had been unprocedural and was "personal", arising from her deteriorating relationship with Makhado mayor Glory Mashaba.

Muthambi returned to work as municipal manager in September 2008 after the Labour Court ruled in her favour, though SAMWU immediately held an illegal strike to protest her return. Later that year, she sued SAMWU and two local newspapers, the Limpopo Mirror and Zoutbansberger, alleging that they had defamed her in connection with the saga; her suit was dismissed.

=== Rise in the ANC ===
Throughout this period, Muthambi remained active in the ANC. She was a member of the regional executive committee of the ANC Youth League in Vhembe from 2003 until 2005, when she was elected to a three-year term as provincial treasurer of the league. She was elected to the regional executive committee of the mainstream ANC in Vhembe in 2006, and to the provincial executive committee of the ANC Women's League in 2008. She later joined the Provincial Executive Committee of the mainstream ANC in Limpopo, and she also served a stint as chairperson of the Black Management Forum's branch in Thohoyandou.

== National Assembly: 2009–2014 ==
Muthambi left Makhado after the 2009 general election, in which she was elected to an ANC seat in the National Assembly, the lower house of the South African Parliament. During her first term in the assembly, she represented the Limpopo constituency and served as a member of the Standing Committee on Public Accounts and Portfolio Committee on Communications; she was the ANC's whip in the latter. She was also a member of the Pan African Parliament from 2009 to 2014. At the very end of the parliamentary term, she was one of seven ANC representatives nominated to serve on the ad hoc committee tasked with devising Parliament's response to the Nkandla scandal.

== Minister of Communications: 2014–2017 ==
In the next general election in 2014, Muthambi was re-elected to her parliamentary seat, now ranked 104th on the ANC's national party list. After the election, President Jacob Zuma appointed her to his second-term cabinet, where she succeeded Yunus Carrim as Minister of Communications, a newly reconfigured portfolio. Marian Shinn, the Shadow Minister of Communications for the opposition Democratic Alliance, welcomed Muthambi's appointment, saying that, in the Portfolio Committee on Communications, she had shown herself to be "a person of integrity" with extensive knowledge of ICT.

Within several months of her appointment, Zuma transferred various communication functions to the Ministry in the Presidency under Jeff Radebe, a move interpreted by the Mail & Guardian as meaning that Muthambi had been "tacitly demoted". Also within her first months in office, Muthambi made the controversial decision to appoint Hlaudi Motsoeneng permanently as the chief operating officer at the public broadcaster, the SABC, despite a recent finding by the Public Protector that he had misconducted himself. The High Court overturned Motsoeneng's appointment as irrational in November 2015.

=== Misconduct allegations ===
Muthambi's tenure in the communications portfolio was highly controversial. The Mail & Guardian labelled her as "the worst minister", and Ferial Haffajee said that, among Zuma's cabinet, she was "the biggest dingbat of all". In February 2017, an ad hoc parliamentary committee on the management of the SABC adopted a report that pointed to prima facie indications of mismanagement by Muthambi, but the committee referred Muthambi's role for further investigation by the parliamentary ethics committee and the president.

In August 2017, Muthambi failed to appear before the Portfolio Committee on Communications, which at the time was probing reports by the Sunday Times that Muthambi had misused public funds for nepotistic purposes, spending R300,000 on flying 30 friends to Cape Town to watch her budget speech and hiring an inflated support staff of 27 people. The chairperson of the committee, Makhosi Khoza, was removed from her post by the ANC shortly after the meeting that Muthambi missed. Muthambi had also had a troubled relationship with Khoza's predecessor in the chair, Joyce Moloi-Moropa.

=== Later revelations ===
==== Gupta Leaks ====
In July 2017, after Muthambi had left the ministry, the so-called Gupta Leaks revealed that Muthambi had corresponded directly with businessman Tony Gupta and his staff on government policy. Among other things, in July 2014, shortly after her appointment, Muthambi emailed Ashu Chawla, Gupta's business associate, a copy of a memo from Telecommunications and Postal Service Minister Siyabonga Cwele. The memo raised Cwele's concerns about proposed amendments to digital migration policy, and, according to the text of Muthambi's email, "Despite my request, the cde is determined to table the matter in cabinet tomorrow". The email was subsequently forwarded to Tony Gupta. Muthambi denied that she had ever "shared any state confidential documents with people I was not supposed to share such information with"; she said that she had emailed Chawla "as a stakeholder and interested party... based on the fact that he owned ANN7". In response to the leaks, the Organisation Undoing Tax Abuse laid charges of high treason and corruption against Muthambi for unauthorised circulation of confidential cabinet documents.

==== Thloloe Commission ====
In August 2019, a commission of inquiry into editorial interference at the SABC published its findings, including the conclusion that Muthambi had abused her power to influence news coverage by the SABC. In the aftermath, Phumzile van Damme of the opposition Democratic Alliance said that the party had laid criminal charges against Muthambi for contravention of the Broadcasting Act, which established the SABC's independence. The party would also pursue a charge of misleading Parliament: according to van Damme, the commission's findings proved that Muthambi had contravened the Powers, Privileges and Immunities of Parliament and Provincial Legislatures Act when she testified in 2016 that she had "never" interfered with the SABC's coverage.

==== Zondo Commission ====
Also after Muthambi's tenure had ended, the Zondo Commission, established to investigate state capture during Zuma's administration, heard evidence about Muthambi's activities at the SABC and the Government Communications and Information System (GCIS). Among other things, Phumla Williams of GCIS testified that Muthambi had systematically weakened the unit, wanting "to steal at all costs"; Williams also said that Muthambi created a hostile work environment tantamount to "torture".

In the final report of the commission, chairperson Raymond Zondo recommended that Muthambi should be referred to the National Prosecuting Authority for contravening the Constitution, her oath of office, and the Prevention and Combatting of Corrupt Activities Act. According to Zondo, Muthambi – with the sanction of Zuma and with the assistance of Hlaudi Motsoeneng – had supported a campaign by the Gupta family to gain undue influence in the communications sector. Zondo confirmed the suggestion of the Gupta Leaks that Muthambi had unauthorised communications with the Gupta family, including by sharing confidential information; he said that, "It is clear that she had abused her powers in a number of instances" and that "like Mr Mosebenzi Zwane, Ms Lynne Brown and Mr Malusi Gigaba, who were Gupta ministers, she too, was a Gupta minister."

== Minister of Public Service and Administration: 2017–2018 ==
In the early hours of 31 March 2017, Zuma announced a major cabinet reshuffle in which Muthambi replaced Ngoako Ramatlhodi as Minister of Public Service and Administration. During her tenure in the ministry, in December 2017, Muthambi attended the ANC's 54th National Conference, where she was elected to her first term on the National Executive Committee (NEC) of the ANC. By popularity, she was ranked 75th among the 80 members elected to the committee.

In early February 2018, the Public Service Commission said that it would investigate the Democratic Alliance's allegation that Muthambi had abused her powers by hiring an over-inflated private office that included her own friends and family. However, weeks later, on 26 February 2018, Muthambi was sacked from the cabinet in the first reshuffle by Zuma's recently elected successor, President Cyril Ramaphosa.

== Return to the backbenches: 2018–present ==
After she was sacked from the cabinet, Muthambi remained an ordinary Member of Parliament, serving in the Portfolio Committee on Labour. She was re-elected to her seat in the 2019 general election, ranked 79th on the ANC's national party list, and afterwards was elected as chairperson of the Portfolio Committee on Cooperative Governance and Traditional Affairs. She held that position until August 2021, when the ANC reshuffled its parliamentary caucus, announcing that Muthambi would swop positions with Fikile Xasa to become chairperson of the Portfolio Committee on Environment, Forestry and Fisheries.

She resigned from the National Assembly on 28 November 2022, and Phillip Modise was elected to succeed her at the head of the environment committee. Despite her departure from frontline politics, she was re-elected to the ANC's NEC in December 2022; she retained her rank of 75 out of 80, receiving 992 votes across roughly 4,000 ballots. She was appointed as deputy chairperson of the NEC's subcommittee on legal and constitutional affairs, deputising Cyril Xaba, and was appointed as a member of the ANC's influential National Disciplinary Committee.

After 18 months away from the National Assembly, Muthambi was returned to her seat in the May 2024 general election, ranked 38th on the ANC's national party list.

== Personal life ==
In 2006, Muthambi's younger sister, Mpho, was abducted from her shack in Vuwani and murdered; her body was found in the Luvuvhu River.
