= University of Durban-Westville =

South African university (1972–2004)

- Established: 1972
- Location: Westville
- Website: udw.ac.za

The University of Durban-Westville (UDW) was a university situated in Westville, a town situated near Durban, South Africa. It was a university for Indian South Africans opened during the apartheid years in 1972, replacing the University College for Indians. It is now one of the campuses of the University of KwaZulu-Natal.

== History ==
The University of Durban-Westville was initially established in 1972 for South Africans of Indian origin, as during apartheid there were few universities that admitted "Non-White" students. Prior to the building of UDW, Indian students travelled by ferry to a facility at Salisbury Island, which had been established in 1961 as the University College for Indians Under apartheid, the different population groups in South Africa had to have separate facilities. The college was the first fully-fledged tertiary educational institution for Indian South Africans. Students used to commute to the college by ferry or boarded in hostels on the island.

UDW offered degrees in commerce, the arts, law, engineering, and health sciences and sciences in general. Later an indoor sports centre was built, which hosted national sporting events. UDW was the hub of many student anti-apartheid political rallies.

== Campaign of intimidation ==
In 1995 it was reported that staff members had been subjected to death threats, violence, break-ins to their homes and offices and smear campaigns by other staff members.

== Merger ==
On 1 January 2004 the university was merged with the University of Natal to create the University of KwaZulu-Natal, as part of a broader reorganisation of South African universities.

== Notable alumni ==
Alumni of University College for Indians include:

- Pravin Gordhan, Minister of Finance
- Sarat Maharaj, author and curator
- Roy Padayachie, Minister of Public Service and Administration in the South Africa

Alumni of UDW include:

- Malusi Gigaba, former Minister of Home Affairs
- Karthy Govender, commissioner for South African Human Rights Commission
- Quarraisha Karim, prominent HIV prevention expert
- Kgosientso Ramokgopa, Executive Mayor of the City of Tshwane in 2010
