= Constance Bapela =

South African politician

Constance Bapela (died 16 February 2018) was a former speaker for the South African city of Johannesburg, and wife of current Deputy Minister of Co-operative Governance and Traditional Affairs Obed Bapela.

== Death ==
Bapela died of a heart attack, three days after a surgery, on 16 February 2018.

== See also ==
- African Commission on Human and Peoples' Rights
- Constitution of South Africa
- History of the African National Congress
- Politics in South Africa
- Provincial governments of South Africa
