= Xawela =

Shawela Shawela Block 23 Shawcity
- Location within Limpopo Location within South Africa
- Coordinates: 23.484°S 30.864°E
- Country: South Africa
- Province: Limpopo
- District: Mopani
- Municipality: Greater Giyani
- Established: 1965

Government
  - Councillor: William Mthombeni (ANC)

Area
  - Total: 4.23 km^{2} (1.63 sq mi)

Population (2011)
  - Total: 4,037
  - Density: 954/km^{2} (2,470/sq mi)

Racial makeup (2011)
  - Black African: 99.7%
  - Indian/Asian: 0.2%

First languages (2011)
  - Tsonga: 90.7%
  - Sotho: 5.4%
  - Northern Sotho: 2.0%
  - Other: 1.8%
- Time zone: UTC+2 (SAST)
- Postal code (street): 0826
- Area code: 015

Xawela is a village in Greater Giyani Local Municipality in the Limpopo province of South Africa. The village was founded in the early 1965 by the homeland or bantustan system under the homeland of Gazankulu.

The community is split into three sections:

First being Xawela is split into two with Ndhuna Manganyi and Ndhuna Cuma responsible for each section. Mahumani ville is The township section of the community and comprise RDP houses and is under Ndhuna Makhongele.

All the three headmen reports to Hosi AK Mahumani of the Mahumani Traditional Council.

== Politics ==
The leading political party is the ANC and the ward councillor is William Mthombeni. The tribal chief for Shawela is Chief Mahumani (Hosi Nkomo).

== Education ==
There are three schools in Shawela, namely Baleni Primary School (1960s); Khwezu Primary School (1993); and Mukula High School.

== Sports, recreation and leisure ==
Shawela United is the biggest team in the area. They make use of JB Chauke Stadium for their home ground matches. In 2012, Shawela United were crowned champions of the tournament of the Minister of Cooperative Governance and Traditional Affairs.

There are also private swimming pools at the local Holobye Lodge and Resort which are available for public use.

An international renowned Salt evaporation pond and hot water spring; the Baleni Rest Camp exists some 3 km from the village. The Camp is run by local women with assistance from African Ivory Route

== Notable people ==
Former cabinet minister and ambassador, His Excellency Masenyani Richard Baloyi is from Xawela.

== Religious views ==
- El Shaddai international evangelism explosion in Mahumani ville led by Prophet ISAIAH SIBANDA
- Gospel Pentecostal Church in Mahumani ville led by Pastor Mpakathi
- Assemblies of God in Main Shawela
- Baleni full gospel church in main Shawela
- Brightness of God of Pastor Ngoveni
- Light of the World of Prophet Lawrence Khosa
- Jerusalem of Pastor Mthuki
