= Jay Naidoo =

South African politician and businessman (born 1954)

Minister of Post, Telecommunications and Broadcasting
- In office 1996–1999
- President: Nelson Mandela
- Preceded by: Pallo Jordan
- Succeeded by: Ivy Matsepe-Casaburri

Minister responsible for the Reconstruction and Development Programme
- In office 1994–1996
- President: Nelson Mandela

General Secretary of the Congress of South African Trade Unions
- In office 1985–1993

Personal details
- Born: 1954 (age 71–72) South Africa
- Party: African National Congress
- Spouse: Lucie Pagé
- Education: University of Durban-Westville
- Occupation: Trade unionist; Politician; Businessman
- Known for: Founding general secretary of COSATU; Cabinet minister under Nelson Mandela
- Awards: Chevalier de la Légion d'Honneur; Drivers for Change Award (2010); Ellen Kuzwayo Award (2012); Honorary doctorate, Durban University of Technology (2013)

Jayaseelan Naidoo (born 1954) is a South African politician and businessman who served as the founding general secretary of the Congress of South African Trade Unions (COSATU) from 1985 to 1993. He then served as Minister responsible for the Reconstruction and Development Programme in the first post-apartheid cabinet of President Nelson Mandela (1994–1996) and as Minister of Post, Telecommunications, and Broadcasting (1996–1999).

Naidoo was a member of the NEC of the African National Congress.

== Early life and education ==
Born in 1954, Naidoo enrolled at the University of Durban-Westville to study for a Bachelor of Science (BSc) degree in pursuance of a medical career in 1975 to be a medical doctor but his studies were interrupted by the political turmoil at the time because of student uprisings.

== Career ==
=== Political career ===
Naidoo became active in the South African Students' Organisation (SASO) that was banned in 1977 just after its leader Steve Biko was murdered in police detention. He then became a community-based organizer working with grassroots civic structures. He joined the Federation of South African Trade Unions as a volunteer in 1979. Naidoo was later appointed secretary general of the Sweet, Food and Allied Workers' Union (SFAWU). In this capacity, he led the country's largest ever nationwide strike with around 3.5 million participants in 1991, paralyzing factories and businesses across South Africa and leaving people without the basic services normally provided by black employees.

In 1995, Naidoo served on the selection panel appointed by President Mandela to interview and shortlist candidates for South Africa's Truth and Reconciliation Commission.

=== Later career ===
From 2002 until 2015, Naidoo was chair of the board of directors and chair of the Partnership Council of the Global Alliance for Improved Nutrition (GAIN) headquartered in Geneva and launched at the 2002 UN Summit on Children as a public private partnership to tackle malnutrition. He is the founder of the social development arm of an investment and management company, J&J Group, which he co-founded in 2000 in South Africa.

From 2001 to 2010, Naidoo served as chairperson of the Development Bank of Southern Africa (DBSA).

In 2010, Naidoo reportedly sold off a third of his stake in J&J Group and donated the proceeds to two unnamed charitable trusts. He has published his autobiography, ‘Fighting for Justice’ and more recently published his book 'Change: Organising Tomorrow, Today.'

In 2013, at the request of the French Minister of Development, Pascal Canfin, Naidoo co-authored a report (with Emmanuel Faber) on reforming Official Development Assistance. That same year, he chaired an international inquiry into labour rights violations in Swaziland, alongside Alec Muchadehama, Paul Verryn and Nomthetho Simelane.

=== Corporate boards ===
- Old Mutual, non-executive member of the board of directors (since 2007)
- Hystra, member of the advisory board

== Recognition ==
Naidoo received the Chevalier de la Légion d’Honneur (Legion of Honour), one of France's highest decorations, and received the ‘Drivers for Change Award’ from the Southern African Trust and Mail & Guardian newspaper in October 2010.

He received the Ellen Kuzwayo Award from the University of Johannesburg, in November 2012, as well as an honorary doctorate technology degree in engineering and the built environment from the Durban University of Technology awarded September 2013.

== Personal life ==
Jay Naidoo is married to Lucie Pagé, a French-Canadian writer and journalist, and has three children.

Political offices
Preceded by Jordan Z.P.	Minister of Communications, Telecommunications and Postal Services. 1996–1999	Succeeded by Casaburri, I.F.M
