= Phillip Modise =

South African politician

Member of the National Assembly of South Africa
- In office 22 May 2019 – 28 May 2024
- Constituency: National List

Personal details
- Born: Phillip Matsapole Pogiso Modise; 5 May 1982 (age 43)
- Party: ANC
- Profession: Politician

Phillip Matsapole Pogiso Modise (born 5 May 1982) is a South African politician and a Member of Parliament for the African National Congress. He was elected to parliament in 2019.

From 2019 until 2024, Modise sat on the Portfolio Committee on Environment, Forestry and Fisheries. He was an alternate member of the Portfolio Committee on Sports, Arts and Culture between June 2019 and August 2021.
