= Minister of Public Service and Administration =

South African cabinet ministry

South Africa Minister of Public Service and Administration
- Flag of South Africa

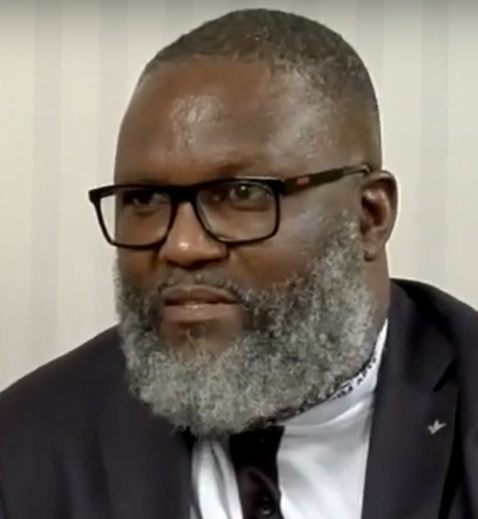
- Incumbent; Mzamo Buthelezi since 30 June 2024
- Department of Public Service and Administration
- Style: The Honourable
- Appointer: The president of South Africa
- Inaugural holder: Zola Skweyiya
- Formation: 11 May 1994
- Deputy: Pinky Kekana
- Website: Department of Public Service and Administration

The minister of public service and administration is a minister in the Cabinet of South Africa. The ministry provides political leadership to the national Department of Public Service and Administration.

== List of ministers ==
Minister	Term		President	Citation
Zola Skweyiya	1994	1999	Mandela (I)	
Geraldine Fraser-Moleketi	1999	2008	Mbeki (I)	
Geraldine Fraser-Moleketi	1999	2008	Mbeki (II)	
Richard Baloyi	2008	2011	Motlanthe (I)	
Richard Baloyi	2008	2011	Zuma (I)	
Roy Padayachie	2011	2012	Zuma (I)	
Lindiwe Sisulu	2012	2014	Zuma (I)	
Collins Chabane	2014	2015	Zuma (II)	
Ngoako Ramatlhodi	2015	2017	Zuma (II)	
Faith Muthambi	2017	2018	Zuma (II)	
Ayanda Dlodlo	2018	2019	Ramaphosa (I)	
Senzo Mchunu	2019	2021	Ramaphosa (II)	
Ayanda Dlodlo	2021	2022	Ramaphosa (II)	
Noxolo Kiviet	2023	2024	Ramaphosa (II)	
Mzamo Buthelezi	2024	–	Ramaphosa (III)	
