= Mondli Gungubele =

South African politician

The Honourable Mondli Gungubele MP
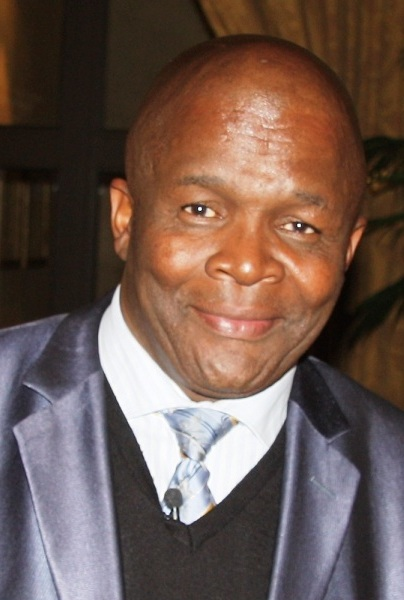
- Gungubele in 2011

Deputy Minister of Communications and Digital Technologies
- Incumbent
- Assumed office 30 June 2024
- Minister: Solly Malatsi
- Preceded by: Philly Mapulane

Minister of Communications and Digital Technologies
- In office 6 March 2023 – 19 June 2024
- President: Cyril Ramaphosa
- Preceded by: Khumbudzo Ntshavheni
- Succeeded by: Solly Malatsi

Minister in the Presidency
- In office 6 August 2021 – 6 March 2023
- President: Cyril Ramaphosa
- Deputy: Thembi Siweya; Pinky Kekana; Zizi Kodwa
- Preceded by: Khumbudzo Ntshavheni (acting); Jackson Mthembu
- Succeeded by: Khumbudzo Ntshavheni

Chairperson of the Portfolio Committee on Social Development
- In office 2 July 2019 – 5 August 2021
- Preceded by: Rosemary Capa
- Succeeded by: Queenie Mvana

Deputy Minister of Finance
- In office 27 February 2018 – 25 May 2019
- President: Cyril Ramaphosa
- Minister: Tito Mboweni
- Preceded by: Sfiso Buthelezi
- Succeeded by: David Masondo

National Executive Committee of the African National Congress
- Incumbent
- Assumed office December 2017

Mayor of Ekurhuleni
- In office 2 November 2010 – 23 August 2016
- Preceded by: Ntombi Mekgwe
- Succeeded by: Mzwandile Masina

National Assembly of South Africa
- Incumbent
- Assumed office 5 September 2016
- Preceded by: Mzwandile Masina
- Constituency: National list
- In office 6 May 2009 – 2 November 2010
- Succeeded by: Paul Mashatile
- Constituency: Gauteng

Gauteng Provincial Legislature
- In office June 1999 – April 2009

Personal details
- Born: Mondli Gungubele; 1 February 1957 (age 69)
- Party: African National Congress
- Occupation: Politician; trade unionist

Mondli Gungubele (born 1 February 1957) is a South African politician and trade unionist who is the current Deputy Minister of Communications and Digital Technologies and a member of the National Assembly of South Africa for the African National Congress. He previously served as Executive Mayor of the Ekurhuleni Metropolitan Municipality (2010–2016), as Deputy Minister of Finance (2018–2019), as Chairperson of the Social Development Committee (2019–2021) and as Minister in the Presidency (2021–2023).

He currently serves as Deputy Minister of Communications and Digital Technologies

== Early life and education ==
Gungubele was born on 1 February 1957. He has a Bachelor of Commerce (BCom) degree in law as well as a National Diploma in Nursing. He taught at Falo Senior Secondary School from 1980 to 1981.

== Early political career ==
Between 1983 and 1990, he served as a trade union leader in the National Union of Mineworkers (NUM). He was active in the Congress of South African Trade Unions from 1989 to 1991. Gungubele was the national organiser of the South African Health Workers Congress in 1991. A member of the African National Congress, he served as chairperson of the ANC's branches in Joubert Park and Vosloorus. Gungubele was a founder member of the ANC's East Rand region in 1991 after the party was unbanned. From 1992 to 2017 he served on the provincial executive committee of the ANC in Gauteng.

== Gauteng government ==
In the first multi-racial elections in 1994, he was elected to the Gauteng Provincial Legislature as an ANC representative. He served as the Member of the Executive Council for multiple portfolios during his time in the Gauteng government. He was the MEC for Social Development and Community Services from 1994 to 1997, when he was appointed as MEC for Health, a position he held until 1999. In 1999, he was appointed to head the Sport, Recreation, Arts and Culture portfolio. Gungubele later became chairperson of the Economic Affairs Portfolio Committee. He resigned from the legislature in 2007.

== National parliament and mayor of Ekurhuleni ==
Gungubele was elected to the National Assembly of South Africa in the 2009 parliamentary elections. He resigned in November 2010 to take up the position of mayor of the Ekurhuleni Metropolitan Municipality. Deputy Minister Mzwandile Masina was nominated as the ANC's mayoral candidate for Ekurhuleni for the August 2016 local elections. Masina was elected to replace Gungubele as mayor after the election, while Gungubele took up his seat in the National Assembly. In 2017, he was elected to the National Executive Committee of the African National Congress.

== Ministerial positions ==
After Cyril Ramaphosa was elected president of South Africa in February 2018, he appointed Gungubele as Deputy Minister of Finance. Gungubele held the position until after the May 8, 2019 elections when David Masondo was appointed to replace him. He was one of only two deputy ministers who were not reappointed to the national executive. In July 2019, he was elected to head the Portfolio Committee on Social Development.

In June 2021, he became a member of the Committee for Section 194 Enquiry which will determine Public Protector Busisiwe Mkhwebane's fitness to hold office.

During a cabinet reshuffle on 5 August 2021, Ramaphosa appointed Gungubele as Minister in the Presidency, replacing the late Jackson Mthembu, who succumbed to COVID-19 in January. As a consequence of this, Gungubele stepped down as chair of the social development committee and lost his committee memberships. He was sworn into office on 6 August.

In January 2022, Ramaphosa designated Gungubele in terms of Section 209(2) of the Constitution to "assume political responsibility for the control and direction" of the State Security Agency. Ramaphosa's decision was criticised by the Democratic Alliance (DA) as "nothing more than a political chess move".

Gungubele was re-elected to another five-year term on the ANC NEC at the party's 55th National Conference held in December 2022.

During a cabinet reshuffle on 6 March 2023, Gungubele was appointed as Minister of Communications and Digital Technologies.

Following the 2024 South African general election he was moved to Deputy Minister of Communications and Digital Technologies.

== Political positions ==
Gungubele has been described as a close ally to president Ramaphosa. He was critical of former president Jacob Zuma. He condemned the violent riots that occurred in KwaZulu-Natal and Gauteng in July 2021.

Political offices
Preceded by Khumbudzo Ntshavheni (acting); Jackson Mthembu	Minister in the Presidency; 2021–present	Succeeded by Khumbudzo Ntshavheni
Preceded by Rosemary Capa	Chairperson of the Portfolio Committee on Social Development; 2019–2021	Succeeded by Queenie Mvana
Preceded by Sfiso Buthelezi	Deputy Minister of Finance; 2018–2019	Succeeded by David Masondo
