= Minister of Communications and Digital Technologies =

Minister of the South African government

South Africa Minister of Communications
- List: 10 other official names: Minister van Kommunikasie (Afrikaans); uNgqongqotjhe wezokuThintana (Southern Ndebele); UMphathiswa lezoNxibelelwano (Xhosa); Indvuna wezokuXhumana (Zulu); Indvuna leTekuchumana (Swazi); Tona ya Dikgokagano (Northern Sotho); Letona la Dikgokahano (Sotho); Tona la Ditlhaeletsano (Tswana); Holobyeya swa Vuhlanganisi (Tsonga); Minisiṱa wa Vhudavhidzani (Venda)
- Flag of South Africa

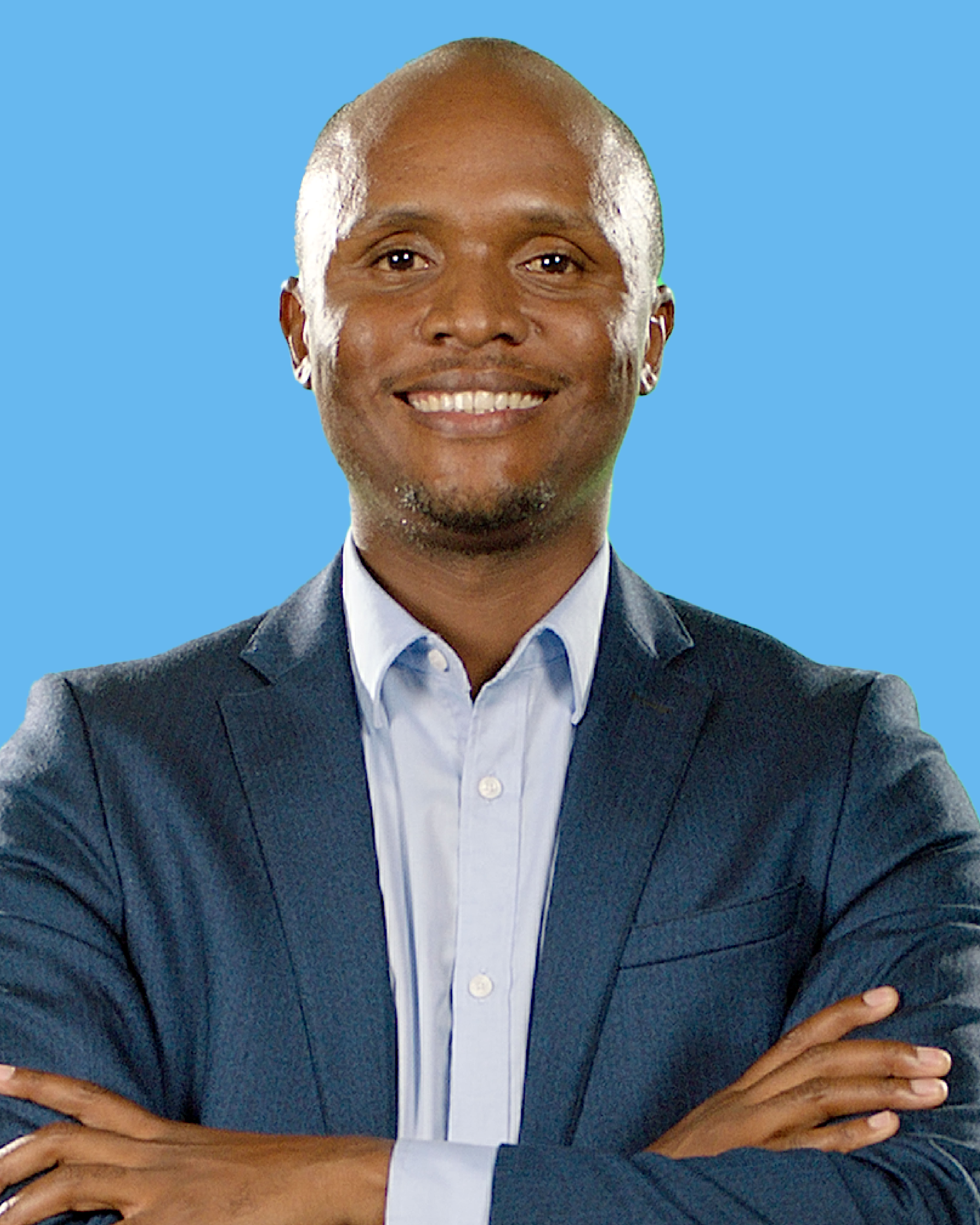
- Incumbent; Solly Malatsi since 3 July 2024
- Department of Communications and Digital Technologies
- Style: The Honourable
- Appointer: Cyril Ramaphosa
- Inaugural holder: Graaff, D.P.DeV
- Deputy: Mondli Gungubele
- Website: Department of Communications and Digital Technologies

The minister of communications and digital technologies (formerly minister of communications, minister of posts, telecommunications and broadcasting and minister of posts and yelecommunications) is a minister in the Government of South Africa, responsible for overseeing the Department of Communications and Digital Technologies.

In May 2014 President Jacob Zuma split the ministry by establishing the position of minister of telecommunications and postal services alongside the minister of communications. However, in a cabinet reshuffle in November 2018, President Cyril Ramaphosa announced the reversal of the split, absorbing the telecommunications and postal services functions back into the Ministry of Communications. The respective departments did not merge until after the 2019 general election. After the election Ramaphosa renamed the office as the minister of communications and digital technologies.

== List of ministers ==
List of ministers responsible for communications, 1994–present
Portfolio	Minister	Party	Term		President
Posts and Telecommunications	Pallo Jordan	ANC	May 1994	March 1996	Mandela
Posts and Telecommunications	Jay Naidoo	ANC	March 1996	June 1999	Mandela
Posts, Telecommunications and Broadcasting	Ivy Matsepe-Casaburri	ANC	June 1999	April 2004	Mbeki
Communications	Ivy Matsepe-Casaburri	ANC	April 2004	May 2009	Mbeki and Motlanthe
Communications	Siphiwe Nyanda	ANC	May 2009	October 2010	Zuma
Communications	Roy Padayachie	ANC	November 2010	October 2011	Zuma
Communications	Dina Pule	ANC	October 2011	July 2013	Zuma
Communications	Yunus Carrim	ANC	July 2013	May 2014	Zuma
Communications	Faith Muthambi	ANC	May 2014	March 2017	Zuma
Communications	Ayanda Dlodlo	ANC	March 2017	October 2017	Zuma
Communications	Mmamoloko Kubayi	ANC	October 2017	February 2018	Zuma
Communications	Nomvula Mokonyane	ANC	February 2018	November 2018	Ramaphosa
Telecommunications and Postal Services	Siyabonga Cwele	ANC	May 2014	November 2018	Zuma and Ramaphosa
Communications and Digital Technologies	Stella Ndabeni-Abrahams	ANC	November 2018	August 2021	Ramaphosa
Communications and Digital Technologies	Khumbudzo Ntshavheni	ANC	August 2021	March 2023	Ramaphosa
Communications and Digital Technologies	Mondli Gungubele	ANC	March 2023	June 2024	Ramaphosa
Communications and Digital Technologies	Solly Malatsi	DA	July 2024	Incumbent	Ramaphosa
