= 54th National Conference of the African National Congress =

Elective meeting of the African National Congress for the year 2017

- 16–20 December 2017

4,776 party delegates 50% + 1 votes needed to win
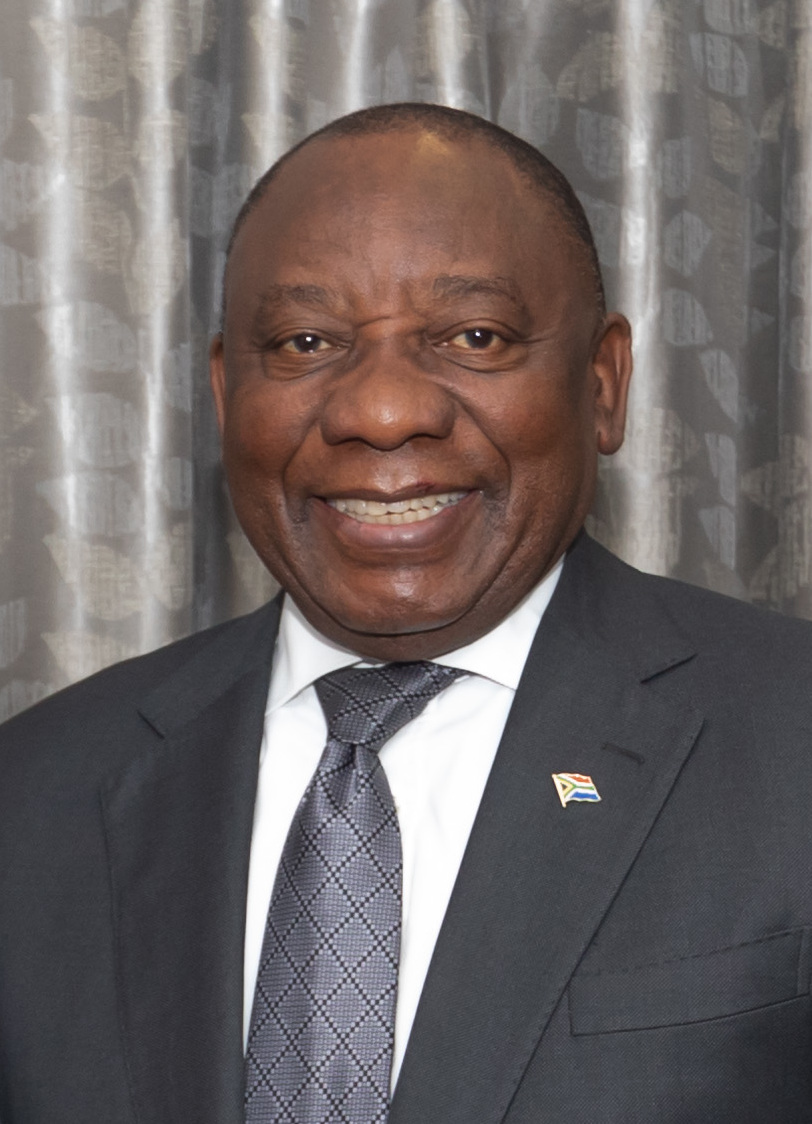

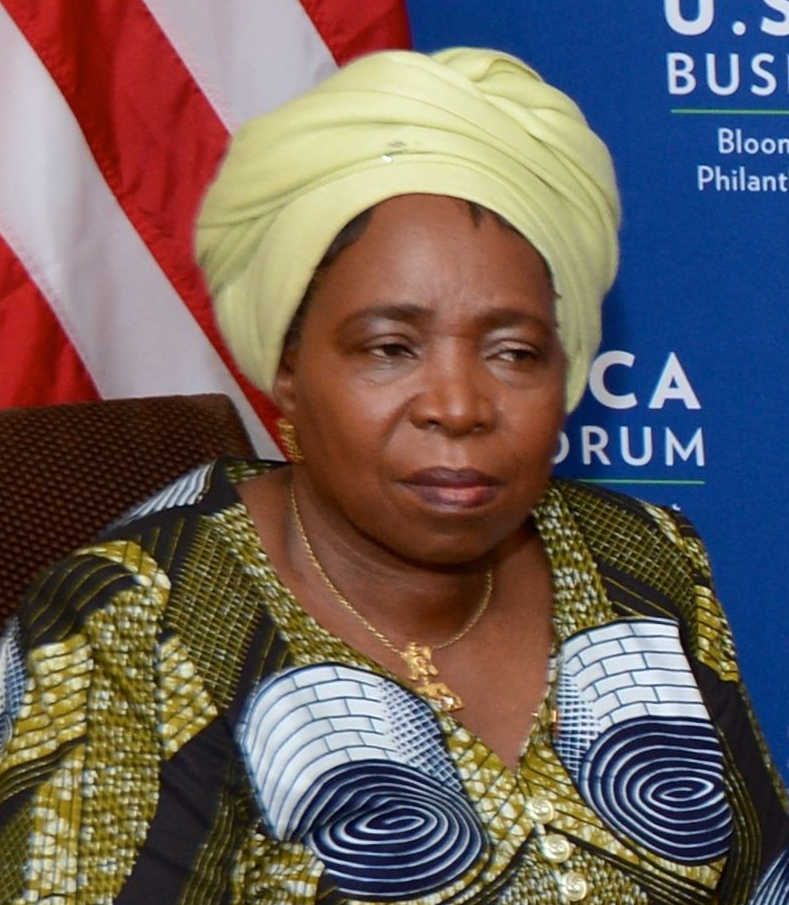
Candidate	Cyril Ramaphosa	Nkosazana Dlamini-Zuma
Delegate vote	2,440	2,261
Percentage	51.90%	48.10%
President before election
Jacob Zuma
Elected President
Cyril Ramaphosa

The 54th National Conference of the African National Congress (ANC) took place from 16 to 20 December 2017 at the Johannesburg Expo Centre in Nasrec, Gauteng. At the conference, the ANC elected its National Executive Committee (NEC) and other top internal leaders. Often referred to as the Nasrec Conference, it was held during the centenary of the birth of former ANC President Oliver Tambo and was convened under the theme, "Remember Tambo: Towards Unity, Renewal and Radical Socioeconomic Transformation."

On 18 December 2017, Cyril Ramaphosa, who had been deputy president of the ANC since 2012 and Deputy President of South Africa since 2014, was elected president of the ANC, narrowly defeating Nkosazana Dlamini-Zuma. On 15 February 2018, following Jacob Zuma's resignation, the National Assembly indirectly elected Ramaphosa, unopposed, as President of South Africa. As ANC President, Ramaphosa was the party's candidate for president in the 2019 South African general election, which the ANC won with 57.50% of the vote. Indeed, because of the ANC's entrenched electoral majority at the national level, every ANC President since Nelson Mandela has been elected president. The internal elections at the conference were hotly contested at least partly for that reason.

== Background ==
Jacob Zuma had been re-elected to a second five-year term as President of South Africa in 2014 and would be ineligible to stand for re-election in 2019. The ANC does not have internal presidential term limits, but Zuma had said as early as 2015 that he would step aside after two terms to allow the party to select a presidential candidate as his successor. In the run-up to the 54th National Conference, much of the campaigning was polarised by Zuma's controversial presidency, and especially by allegations that he had facilitated widespread state capture. In April 2017, there were nation-wide protests calling for Zuma's resignation, and by April a motion of no confidence had been tabled in Parliament, though it was narrowly defeated in August. However, Zuma and his allies retained substantial support, especially within certain party structures.

=== Ramaphosa campaign ===
The National Union of Mineworkers endorsed Cyril Ramaphosa for the presidency in September 2016, and the Young Communist League of the South African Communist Party endorsed him as early as January 2017. During the same period, Ramaphosa spoke out against corruption in his public addresses. However, internal ANC campaigning is rarely overt, and it is widely accepted that Ramaphosa did not publicly launch his campaign (though unofficially) until an SACP event, organised in memory of Chris Hani, in Uitenhage, Eastern Cape on 23 April 2017. Speaking at the event alongside Mcebisi Jonas, who had been fired as Deputy Finance Minister by Zuma shortly after making public claims about corruption in government, Ramaphosa criticised factionalism, patronage, and rent-seeking among state and party officials, and said that he would support a judicial commission of inquiry into allegations of state capture. Ramaphosa campaigned under the banner #CR17 Siyavuma, on a platform of anti-corruption and pro-industrialisation, pro-investment economic policies. His economic agenda was set out in his "10-Point Plan." He was supported by the Congress of South African Trade Unions and the SACP, as well as by politicians including Angie Motshekga and Pravin Gordhan.

The financing of Ramaphosa's campaign, which reportedly cost several hundred million rand, has more recently become the subject of various allegations against Ramaphosa. Most prominently, the Public Protector Busisiwe Mkhwebane implicated his campaign in financial misconduct. However, the Constitutional Court overturned her findings in July 2021.

=== Dlamini-Zuma campaign ===
Nkosazana Dlamini-Zuma had been the head of the African Union Commission in Addis Ababa, but in mid-2016 she announced that she would not stand for a second term, and she returned to South Africa in early 2017. She also received endorsements as early as January 2017, from the ANC Women's League, and on some accounts her supporters had been "lobbying openly" for her candidacy during 2016. She was also later endorsed by the ANC Youth League and the Umkhonto we Sizwe Military Veterans' Association. Dlamini-Zuma's campaign, under the banner #WeAreReady, centred on land redistribution, reform at the South African Reserve Bank, and economic transformation generally. Indeed, the ANC faction to which she was aligned was, and still is, sometimes referred to as the Radical Economic Transformation (RET) faction. "Radical economic transformation" was a longstanding policy slogan of the ANC, but was revived by Zuma in 2017 and subsequently was sometimes used by his allies to defend "rent-seeking practices" and the influence of the Gupta family. Thus, whereas Ramaphosa was taken as the anti-Zuma candidate, Dlamini-Zuma was seen as strongly aligned with her ex-husband and his allies.

=== Other presidential contenders ===
Although Ramaphosa and Dlamini-Zuma were long considered the frontrunners, other ANC members who campaigned officially or unofficially for the Presidency included Lindiwe Sisulu (under the slogan "It's a Must"), Zweli Mkhize ("#AbantuBathi"), Mathews Phosa ("Saving the ANC"), Baleka Mbete, and Jeff Radebe. However, in early December 2017, following the ANC provincial general congresses, the party branches in Gauteng, Limpopo, the Northern Cape, the Eastern Cape, and the Western Cape nominated Ramaphosa for the presidency; KwaZulu-Natal, the North West, Mpumalanga, and the Free State nominated Dlamini-Zuma. At that point, a serious challenge from a third candidate became unlikely, although one could still have emerged during the conference if he or she was nominated from the floor and received substantial support. Shortly afterwards, Sisulu dropped out of the presidency contest to pursue the nomination she had received for the deputy presidency, and she ultimately joined Ramaphosa's slate. Mkhize was also nominated for the deputy presidency, but withdrew his candidacy amid rumours that he had made a deal with the Dlamini-Zuma faction. Mbete endorsed Ramaphosa at the start of the conference.

== Leadership election ==
On the second day of the conference, delegates elected candidates for the "Top Six" leadership positions (president, deputy president, chairperson, secretary general, deputy secretary general and treasurer). Voting ran through the night on 17 to 18 December, and the results, announced on the evening of Monday 18 December, were as follows (victorious candidates in bold):

Position	Candidate	Votes	
President	**Cyril Ramaphosa**	**2,440**	**51.90%**
President	Nkosazana Dlamini-Zuma	2,261	48.10%
Deputy President	**David Mabuza**	**2,538**	**54.03%**
Deputy President	Lindiwe Sisulu	2,159	45.97%
National Chairperson	**Gwede Mantashe**	**2,418**	**51.59%**
National Chairperson	Nathi Mthethwa	2,269	48.41%
Secretary General	**Ace Magashule**	**2,360**	**50.26%**
Secretary General	Senzo Mchunu	2,336	49.74%
Deputy Secretary General	**Jessie Duarte**	**2,474**	**52.78%**
Deputy Secretary General	Zingiswa Losi	2,213	47.21%
Treasurer General	**Paul Mashatile**	**2,517**	**53.61%**
Treasurer General	Maite Nkoana-Mashabane	2,178	46.39%

Ramaphosa and Dlamini-Zuma had campaigned alongside slates of "preferred" candidates for the other Top Six positions. Of those elected, Gwede Mantashe and Paul Mashatile had run on the Ramaphosa slate; the other three winners campaigned with Dlamini-Zuma. Although all the races were close, the Secretary General contest was the tightest, with Free State Premier Ace Magashule winning by only 24 votes.

== Election of the National Executive Committee ==
The other 80 members of the National Executive Committee were elected and announced at the end of the conference. 235 candidates appeared on the ballot sheets, and 4,283 ballots were cast among the 4,776 eligible voters. The committee as constituted at the conference has been described as evenly split between Zuma supporters and Ramaphosa supporters. Among the incumbents who failed to gain re-election were Communist Party leaders Blade Nzimande and Thulas Nxesi, head of the umKhonto we Sizwe Military Veterans' Association Kebby Maphatsoe, and party stalwart Winnie Madikizela-Mandela. The following ten candidates received the most votes:

1. Zweli Mkhize (2,550 votes)
2. Lindiwe Zulu (2,280 votes)
3. Reginah Mhaule
4. David Masondo (2,076 votes)
5. Malusi Gigaba (2,029 votes)
6. Ronald Lamola
7. Violet Siwela (2,009 votes)
8. Zizi Kodwa (1,998 votes)
9. Nkosazana Dlamini-Zuma (1,975 votes)
10. Obed Bapela

== Resolutions ==
Notable resolutions agreed at the Conference included that the ANC should pursue land expropriation without compensation as a matter of national policy, that the mandate of the South African Reserve Bank should be expanded, and that ANC members alleged to have been involved in corruption should "step aside" pending further investigation. The former two resolutions are considered triumphs of the so-called Radical Economic Transformation faction over the Ramaphosa-aligned faction, and the implementation of all three has been much contested.
