= Ivy Matsepe-Casaburri =

South African politician (1937–2009)

President of South Africa
- Acting; 24 September 2008 – 25 September 2008
- Appointed by: Cabinet of South Africa
- Preceded by: Thabo Mbeki
- Succeeded by: Kgalema Motlanthe

Minister of Communications, Telecommunications and Postal Services
- In office 17 June 1999 – 6 April 2009
- President: Thabo Mbeki; Kgalema Motlanthe
- Preceded by: Jay Naidoo
- Succeeded by: Siphiwe Nyanda

2nd Premier of the Free State
- In office 18 December 1996 – 15 June 1999
- Preceded by: Mosiuoa Lekota
- Succeeded by: Winkie Direko

Personal details
- Born: 18 September 1937 Kroonstad, South Africa
- Died: 6 April 2009 (aged 71) Pretoria, South Africa
- Party: African National Congress
- Education: University of Fort Hare; Rutgers University
- Occupation: Politician; teacher

Ivy Florence Matsepe-Casaburri (18 September 1937 – 6 April 2009) was a South African politician. She was the 2nd premier of the Free State and South Africa's Minister of Communications from 1999 until her death. She served briefly as South Africa's acting president in 2005, when both President Thabo Mbeki and the deputy president were outside the country. Furthermore, she was chosen by the cabinet to be the constitutional and official head of state in an interim capacity for 14 hours on 25 September 2008, between the resignation of Thabo Mbeki and the taking of office by Kgalema Motlanthe. She was the first woman to have held the post of president in South Africa and the first woman to be head of state of South Africa since Elizabeth II's reign as Queen of South Africa ended in 1961. She remained the only woman with this distinction until July 2021, when Angie Motshekga was appointed acting president.

== Early life ==
Ivy Matsepe-Casaburri was born on 18 September 1937 in Kroonstad in the Free State. Her father was a principal, musician and sportsman and her mother was a teacher, and a social and community worker. She completed her primary education in Kroonstad and attended secondary school in Kwa-Zulu Natal. She then obtained her Bachelor of Arts degree from Fort Hare University and proceeded to teach in KZN for two years.

== Exile ==
At the age of 28, she went into exile and would return to South Africa only 25 years later. She first worked in Swaziland as a teacher for at least ten years before she moved to the United States. During her time in exile, she furthered her education. She went to the United States where she undertook her postgraduate studies. She worked for the United Nations Institute for Namibia as a lecturer and registrar, based in Zimbabwe. She obtained her PhD in sociology from Rutgers University–New Brunswick.

== Professional life ==
She served briefly as South Africa's acting president in 2005, when both President Thabo Mbeki and the deputy president were outside the country. Furthermore, she was chosen by the cabinet to be the constitutional and official head of state in an interim capacity for 14 hours on 25 September 2008, between the resignation of Thabo Mbeki and the taking of office by Kgalema Motlanthe. She was the first and to date only woman to have held the post of president in South Africa and the first woman to be head of state of South Africa since Elizabeth II's reign as Queen of South Africa in 1961.

== Offices held ==
- Minister of Communications in the South African Government from June 1999 to April 2009
- Member of Parliament in the National Assembly from 1999 to 2009
- Premier of the Free State from 1996 to 1999; first female premier
- Chairperson of Sentech, the first black person and woman
- Chairperson of the South African Broadcasting Corporation (SABC); the first female and black chairperson
- Lecturer at Rutgers University
- Associate professor at Rutgers University
- Senior lecturer and registrar at the United Nations Institute for Namibia
- Director for Council for Scientific and Industrial Research

== Death ==
She died of natural causes on 6 April 2009 during her term in office as the Minister of Communications.

Political offices
Preceded by Thabo Mbeki	President of South Africa; Acting; 2008	Succeeded by Kgalema Motlanthe
Preceded by Jay Naidoo	Minister of Communications; 1999–2009	Succeeded by Siphiwe Nyanda
Preceded by Mosiuoa Lekota	Premier of the Free State; 1996–1999	Succeeded by Winkie Direko
