= Yunus Carrim =

South African politician (born 1956)

Minister of Communications
- In office 10 July 2013 – 26 May 2014
- President: Jacob Zuma
- Preceded by: Dina Pule
- Succeeded by: Faith Muthambi

Personal details
- Party: African National Congress
- Education: University of Warwick; Darlington College of Technology

Yunus Carrim is a South African politician who served as the Minister of Communications from 2013–2014. Carrim is a self-proclaimed Marxist and serves on the South African Communist Party Central Committee and is a Politburo member.

Currently, Honorable Carrim is also a board member of The Parliamentary Network on the World Bank & International Monetary Fund.
