= Minister in the Presidency =

Minister in the Cabinet of South Africa

South Africa Minister of the Presidency
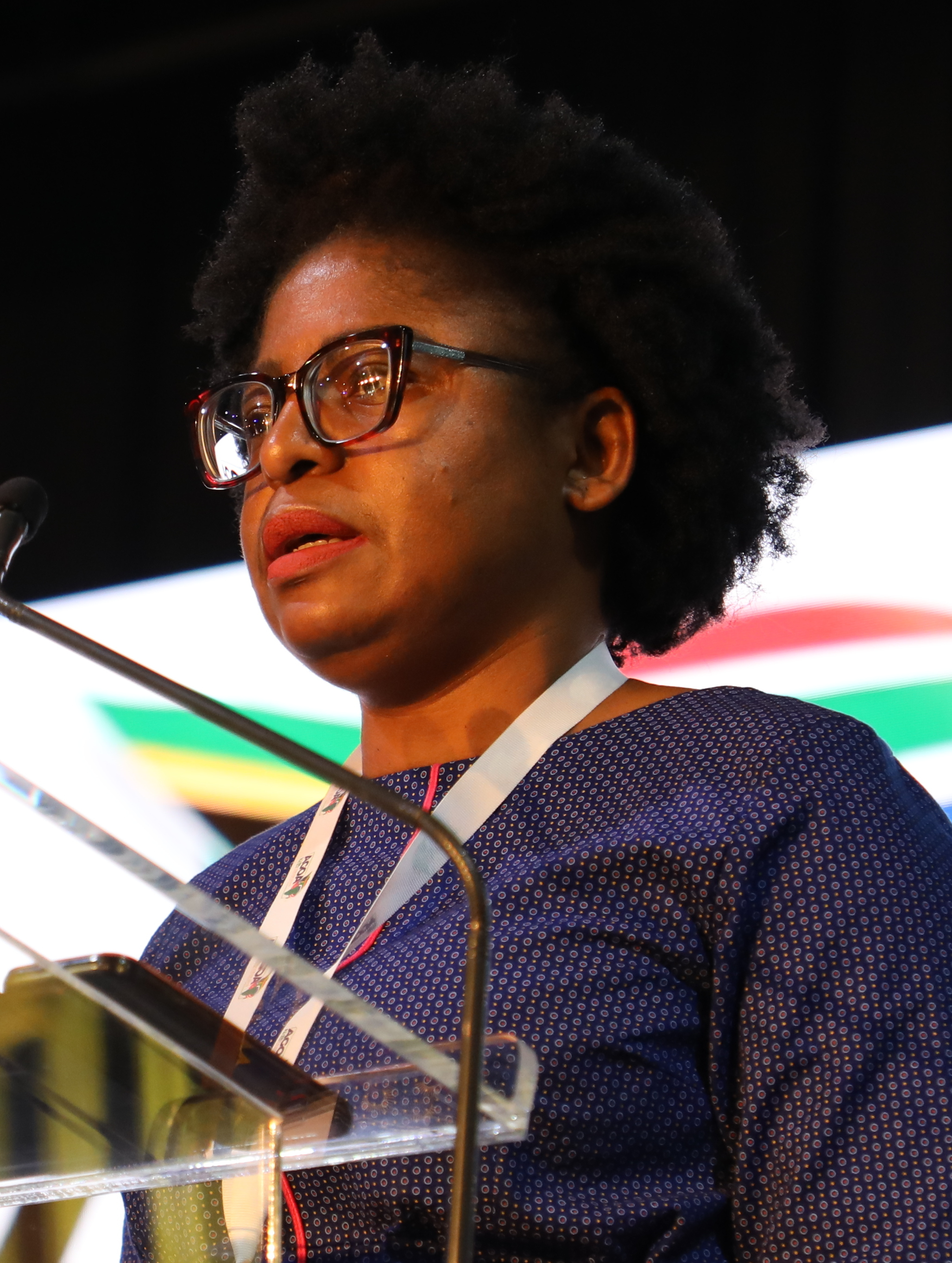
- Incumbent; Khumbudzo Ntshavheni since 6 March 2023
- The Presidency
- Style: The Honourable
- Appointer: President of South Africa
- Inaugural holder: Essop Pahad
- Formation: 1999; 27 years ago
- Website: thepresidency.gov.za

The Minister in the Presidency is a minister in the Cabinet of South Africa, appointed by the President of South Africa. The minister has general responsibility for portfolios in the Office of the President of South Africa. Some former Ministers in the Presidency have been assigned specific portfolios.

The current minister in the presidency is Khumbudzo Ntshavheni, who was appointed to the position in March 2023.

== History ==
The first minister in the presidency was Essop Pahad, who served in the position under President Thabo Mbeki's and who was a notoriously powerful figure in Mbeki's government.

== Functions and responsibilities ==
The minister in the presidency has political responsibility for the Department of Planning, Monitoring and Evaluation, Statistics South Africa, the Government Communication and Information System, the Media Development and Diversity Agency, Brand South Africa, and the State Security Agency.

== List of ministers with general portfolios ==
Name	Portrait	Term		Party	President
Essop Pahad		1999	2008	ANC	Thabo Mbeki (Mbeki I) (Mbeki II)
Manto Tshabalala-Msimang		2008	2009	ANC	Kgalema Motlanthe (Motlanthe)
Jeff Radebe		2014	2018	ANC	Jacob Zuma (Zuma II)
Nkosazana Dlamini-Zuma		2018	2019	ANC	Cyril Ramaphosa (Ramaphosa I)
Jackson Mthembu		2019	2021	ANC	Cyril Ramaphosa (Ramaphosa II)
Mondli Gungubele		2021	2023	ANC	Cyril Ramaphosa (Ramaphosa II)
Khumbudzo Ntshavheni		2023		ANC	Cyril Ramaphosa (Ramaphosa II)

== List of ministers with specialised portfolios ==
=== National Planning Commission, 2009–2014 ===
Name	Portrait	Term		Party	President
Trevor Manuel		2009	2014	ANC	Jacob Zuma (I)

=== Performance monitoring, evaluation and administration, 2009–2014 ===
Name	Portrait	Term		Party	President
Collins Chabane		2009	2014	ANC	Jacob Zuma (I)
