= Ayanda Dlodlo =

South African politician (born 1963)

The Honourable Ayanda Dlodlo
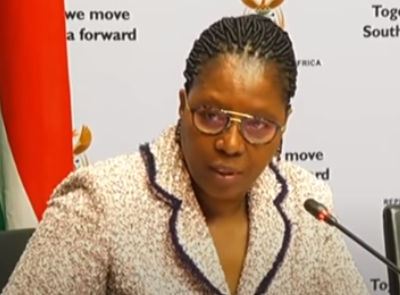

Minister of Public Service and Administration
- In office 5 August 2021 – 4 April 2022
- Preceded by: Senzo Mchunu
- Succeeded by: Thulas Nxesi (acting)
- In office 27 February 2018 – 25 May 2019
- Preceded by: Faith Muthambi
- Succeeded by: Senzo Mchunu

Minister of State Security
- In office 30 May 2019 – 5 August 2021
- Preceded by: Dipuo Letsatsi-Duba
- Succeeded by: Office abolished

Minister of Home Affairs
- In office 17 October 2017 – 28 February 2018
- Preceded by: Hlengiwe Mkhize
- Succeeded by: Malusi Gigaba

Minister of Communications
- In office 31 March 2017 – 17 October 2017
- Preceded by: Faith Muthambi
- Succeeded by: Mmamoloko Kubayi-Ngubane

Personal details
- Born: 22 May 1963 (age 62) South Africa
- Party: African National Congress

Ayanda Dlodlo (born 22 May 1963) is a South African politician and former cabinet minister. A former member of Umkhonto we Sizwe, she became a Member of Parliament for the African National Congress (ANC) in 2009. Thereafter, she was appointed Minister of Communications (2017), Minister of Home Affairs (2017–2018), Minister of Public Service and Administration (2018–2019, 2021–2022), and Minister of State Security (2019–2021).

Dlodlo is known for having been responsible for the state security portfolio during the 2021 civil unrest in South Africa, and has also been a member of the ANC National Executive Committee since 2007. In April 2022, she resigned from government to take up a directorship at the World Bank.

== Early life ==
Dlodlo was born in her grandmother's house in Soweto, Gauteng in South Africa, and had one sibling, a sister. Her mother was a student nurse and her father was studying toward a Bachelor of Science; he later earned an education degree and became a school principal. While Dlodlo was a toddler, her family moved to neighbouring Swaziland (now Eswatini), a self-imposed exile to avoid South Africa's apartheid system and especially the Bantu education system. She attended a private school in Swaziland until, when she was a teenager, her parents divorced, and she and her mother returned to Johannesburg. Shortly afterwards, in 1980, Dlodlo – then aged 17 – decided to leave South Africa again to join Umkhonto we Sizwe (MK), the armed wing of the anti-apartheid African National Congress (ANC).

She received MK military training in Angola and later received military intelligence training in the Soviet Union. Her work with MK included, in the first half of the 1980s, leading a unit which was responsible for infiltrating MK operatives across the Swazi border into Natal. In 1990, she was elected head of the youth section of the ANC for England and Northern Ireland; she was abroad in order to pursue postgraduate studies at the London Institute of Shipping. She ultimately earned a higher certificate in shipping and transport management (1990), a postgraduate diploma in business management (2017), and a Master of Business Administration (2020).

Dlodlo remained in exile with the ANC until 1994, when apartheid was formally abolished. Upon her return, she learned that her sister, during her absence, had been killed by apartheid security forces, and that her mother had been traumatised by detention and torture.

== Career ==
=== Business ===
Dlodlo's first post-apartheid job was at Portnet. In her subsequent career in the private sector, she worked at the South African National Ports Authority and South African Freight Rail Company, and also worked on special assignments for the Port Authority of New York and New Jersey and Associated British Ports. In 2014, she said that she had been a director or shareholder in at least 36 companies over the course of her career – including Rosschef Africa, the Wired Cloud, and Women in Energy – although she claimed to have resigned most of those positions when she joined the government.

Dlodlo was also director of a company called VIP Consulting Engineers, during the period in which the company had sanitation contracts with the government in Ekurhuleni, Gauteng. Because the company never fulfilled the contract, the National Treasury blacklisted the company and all its directors, including Dlodlo, restricting them from doing business with any level of government for five years between July 2012 and 2017. By the time the blacklisting came into effect in 2012, Dlodlo was working in the national government and had resigned from the company.

=== Government ===
Dlodlo was director of strategic operations at the Directorate of Special Operations, commonly known as the Scorpions, a specialised unit in the National Prosecuting Authority, but resigned in 2004. After her resignation, she was investigated and then indicted on charges of fraud and theft relating to her work at the Scorpions between 2003 and 2004: she was alleged to have stolen some amount (disputed in various reports) from a confidential NPA fund and to have fraudulently inflated a payment to an informant by R30,000. She was arrested in October 2006, but the charges against her were dropped in May 2007; she said she had expected it, given that the charges were "laughable".

Dlodlo resigned from the Scorpions in 2004 to join the Gauteng provincial government, and became head of the provincial Department of Safety and Security.

==== Zuma presidency (2007–2018) ====
Between 2007 and 2012, she was secretary general of the MK Military Veterans’ Association, and supported Jacob Zuma's successful bid to become ANC president at the Polokwane conference. At the conference, which took place in December 2007, Dlodlo was herself elected to the ANC's National Executive Committee. At the same time, pursuant to the 2009 national election, which also saw Zuma elected to the national presidency, Dlodlo became a Member of Parliament for the ANC; the following year, she was appointed parliamentary counsellor to President Zuma. In May 2010, Dlodlo was one of three members of an ANC disciplinary committee that found Julius Malema guilty of contravening aspects of the ANC constitution. Also in 2010, a memorandum from one-time consultant Gayton McKenzie to Gold Fields identified Dlodlo as a person of influence in Zuma's office who had "spent a great deal of time" helping Gold Fields to lobby Zuma in relation to mining contracts; excerpts from the memorandum were published by the Mail & Guardian in 2013.

In November 2010, Zuma appointed Dlodlo his Deputy Minister of Public Service and Administration, a position which she retained after Zuma's re-election in 2014 and which she held until March 2017. In this capacity she represented South Africa at the Open Government Partnership, and continued to do so from 2011 to 2019. In a cabinet reshuffle in the early hours of 31 March 2017, Zuma appointed Dlodlo to his second cabinet, making her Minister of Communications; in another reshuffle on 17 October 2017, Dlodlo was made Minister of Home Affairs, a portfolio which she retained for the rest of Zuma's tenure in office. During Zuma's administration, Dlodlo was also re-elected twice to the ANC National Executive Committee – in 2012 and then in 2017 – and she chaired its subcommittee on legislation and governance between 2015 and 2017.

During this period, she was implicated in two mild scandals. First, in 2015, while deputy minister, Dlodlo took a controversial holiday to the Oberoi Hotel in Dubai; it later transpired, in media reports based on the so-called Gupta Leaks, that the trip had been arranged by Sahara Computers, a company owned by the controversial Gupta family, and had been sponsored by Fana Hlongwane. Whistleblower Vytjie Mentor also alleged, in a Facebook post, that Dlodlo had accepted a free luxury trip to Paris. Following these reports, in 2017, Dlodlo acknowledged that she had been wrong not to disclose the Dubai trip as a gift. Pursuant to a complaint by opposition MP Phumzile van Damme, a parliamentary committee found that Dlodlo had breached the parliamentary code of conduct and should be reprimanded. Second, also in 2017, the Democratic Alliance, the ANC's main opposition, condemned Dlodlo for spending R1.5 million in public funds on two ministerial cars, both Audis.

==== Ramaphosa presidency (2018–2022) ====
When Zuma resigned in February 2018, Dlodlo was appointed Minister of Public Service and Administration in the first cabinet of his successor, Cyril Ramaphosa, where she was tasked with restructuring the national public service. However, after Ramaphosa was inaugurated for his first full term as president in May 2019, she became Minister of State Security in his second cabinet. She was in this position during the July 2021 civil unrest in South Africa, which led to vigorous public and political debate about alleged intelligence failures by state security agencies. Dlodlo later said that she felt she had been unfairly scapegoated. Weeks after the unrest, on 5 August 2021, Ramaphosa abolished the State Security portfolio and moved her back to the Public Service and Administration portfolio. However, in early April 2022, Dlodlo resigned from the cabinet and the National Assembly to become an executive director on the board of the World Bank, with special responsibility for Angola, Nigeria, and South Africa. She said she had handed in her resignation as early as October 2021, though Ramaphosa had not announced it until months later.

== Personal life ==
Dlodlo is married and has at least one son, Thabang Mnisi.
