= Collins Chabane =

South African politician (1960–2015)

The Honourable Ohm Collins Chabane

Minister of Public Service and Administration
- In office 26 May 2014 – 15 March 2015
- President: Jacob Zuma
- Preceded by: Lindiwe Sisulu
- Succeeded by: Nathi Mthethwa

Secretary General of the ANC
- In office 1997–1999

Personal details
- Born: Ohm Collins Chabane; 15 April 1960 Transvaal, Union of South Africa
- Died: 15 March 2015 (aged 54)
- Citizenship: South African
- Party: African National Congress
- Spouse: Mavis Nkhensani Chabane
- Children: Matimba Chabane and Tsakani Chabane
- Education: Technikon South Africa
- Occupation: Politician

Ohm Collins Chabane (15 April 1960 – 15 March 2015) was a South African Minister of Public Service and Administration. At the age of 17, he went into exile and joined the African National Congress (ANC) underground military wing Umkhonto we Sizwe (MK). Chabane also went to Angola for military training in 1980, and began work underground in 1981.

== Early life and education ==
Chabane was born in Xikundu Village, in what was then the Northern Transvaal District (now the Limpopo province) of the Transvaal province. He attended Shingwedzi High School and after high school registered for a BSc at Turfloop University, but a year at the age of 17 he joined the ANC underground. Chabane was arrested by the Security Police in 1984, and was sentenced to six years imprisonment on charges of terrorism. He was imprisoned at the same time as Tokyo Sexwale, Kgalema Motlanthe, Mosiuoa Lekota and Popo Molefe.

During his time in prison he obtained a Diploma in Electrical Engineering from Technikon South Africa, and studied aviation. Chabane also held a Diploma in Management from Arusha in Tanzania.

== Politician ==
After his release from prison, Chabane was elected to parliament in 1994, where he served on the constitutional affairs, defense and intelligence committees. In 1997, he was appointed MEC for Limpopo, in Premier Ngoako Ramatlhodi's cabinet. In 1998, he moved to public works, where he is credited as having established the province's Roads Agency. Under the first term of Jacob Zuma's presidency, he was appointed as Minister in the Presidency. He also arranged Nelson Mandela's funeral in December 2013.

== Personal life ==
Chabane also developed his interest in music (while in prison), headed a marimba band and recorded two CDs.

== Death ==
In the early hours of Sunday, 15 March 2015, Chabane was killed, aged 55, in a traffic accident when a truck made a U-turn in front of Chabane's car on the N1 near Polokwane, after attending a funeral of Samuel Dickenson Nxumalo, the third Chief Minister of Gazankulu homeland.

== See also ==
- List of members of the National Assembly of South Africa who died in office
