= Departments of the Government of South Africa =

The executive branch of the national government of South Africa is divided into the cabinet and the civil service, as in the Westminster system. Public administration, the day-to-day implementation of legislation and policy, is managed by government departments (including state agencies with department status), which are usually headed by permanent civil servants with the title of director-general.

Each department also has a political head, a cabinet minister, who is appointed by the president and who has ultimate oversight over and political responsibility for that department. A ministerial portfolio often includes more than one department. Even when the relationship between ministers and departments is one-to-one, the ministry is not coterminous with the department: they are legislatively and operationally distinct. The ministry usually consists of the minister, one or more deputy ministers, and a small number of advisors and other ministerial staff. According to Section 85 of the Constitution, ultimate executive authority in South Africa is vested in the president and exercised by the cabinet.

== Current departments ==
The following list shows the departments as they have been since September 2024, when a presidential proclamation formally implemented the restructuring that followed the appointment of the multi-party third cabinet of Cyril Ramaphosa.

Minister	Department	Previous name(s)
Minister of Agriculture	Department of Agriculture	
Minister of Basic Education	Department of Basic Education	
Minister of Communications and Digital Technologies	Department of Communications and Digital Technologies	Department of Communications
Minister of Cooperative Governance and Traditional Affairs	Department of Cooperative Governance	Department of Provincial and Local Government
Minister of Cooperative Governance and Traditional Affairs	Department of Traditional Affairs	
Minister of Correctional Services	Department of Correctional Services	
Minister of Defence and Military Veterans	Department of Defence	Department of Defence and Military Veterans (until 2009)
Minister of Defence and Military Veterans	Department of Military Veterans	
Minister of Electricity and Energy	Department of Electricity and Energy	Department of Energy
Minister of Employment and Labour	Department of Employment and Labour	Department of Labour (until 2019)
Minister of Finance	National Treasury	
Minister of Finance	South African Revenue Service	
Minister of Forestry, Fisheries and the Environment	Department of Forestry, Fisheries and the Environment	Department of Environment, Forestry and Fisheries
Minister of Health	Department of Health	
Minister of Higher Education, Science and Technology	Department of Higher Education and Training	
Minister of Higher Education, Science and Technology	Department of Science and Innovation	Department of Science and Technology (until 2019)
Minister of Home Affairs	Department of Home Affairs	
Minister of Human Settlements	Department of Human Settlements	Department of Housing (until 2009)
Minister of International Relations and Cooperation	Department of International Relations and Cooperation	Department of Foreign Affairs (until 2009)
Minister of Justice and Constitutional Development	Department of Justice and Constitutional Development	Department of Justice
Minister of Land Reform and Rural Development	Department of Land Reform and Rural Development	
Minister of Mineral and Petroleum Resources	Department of Mineral and Petroleum Resources	Department of Mineral Resources
Minister of Police	Department of Police	Department of Safety and Security (until 2009)
Minister of Police	South African Police Service	
Minister of Police	Independent Police Investigative Directorate	Independent Complaints Directorate
Minister of Police	Civilian Secretariat for the Police Service	
Minister in the Presidency	Department of Planning, Monitoring and Evaluation	Department of Performance Monitoring and Evaluation
Minister in the Presidency	Government Communication and Information System	South African Communication Service
Minister in the Presidency	State Security Agency	
Minister in the Presidency	Statistics South Africa	Central Statistical Service
Minister in the Presidency for Women, Youth and Persons with Disabilities	Department of Women, Youth and Persons with Disabilities	Department of Women, Children and People with Disabilities (until 2014); Department of Women (until 2019)
Minister of Public Service and Administration	Department of Public Service and Administration	Office of the Minister for the Public Service and Administration
Minister of Public Service and Administration	National School of Government	South African Management and Development Institute; Public Administration Leadership and Management Academy
Minister of Public Works and Infrastructure	Department of Public Works and Infrastructure	Department of Public Works (until 2019)
Minister of Science, Technology and Innovation	Department of Science, Technology and Innovation	Department of Science and Technology; Department of Science and Innovation
Minister of Small Business Development	Department of Small Business Development	
Minister of Social Development	Department of Social Development	Department of Welfare
Minister of Sport, Arts and Culture	Department of Sport, Arts and Culture	
Minister of Tourism	Department of Tourism	
Minister of Trade, Industry and Competition	Department of Trade, Industry and Competition	Department of Trade and Industry
Minister of Transport	Department of Transport	
Minister of Water and Sanitation	Department of Water and Sanitation	Department of Water Affairs

== History ==
=== Deputy presidents ===
During the Government of National Unity (GNU) after the 1994 election, the Office of the Executive Deputy President and the Office of the Executive Deputy President from the Largest Minority Party were established as separate departments. The latter was abolished after the National Party pulled out of the GNU in 1996, and the former was abolished after the 1999 election which terminated the GNU.

=== Restructuring ===
The following is a list of former departments which were dissolved in mergers or divisions, especially during major restructurings in 2009 and 2019:

Former departments of the South African government
Department	Term	Minister	Successor
Department of Education	Until 2009	Minister of Education	Divided into the Department of Basic Education and the Department of Higher Education and Training in 2009.
Department of Economic Development	2009–2019	Minister of Economic Development	Created in 2009, and merged with the Department of Trade and Industry in 2019 to create the Department of Trade, Industry and Competition.
Department of Telecommunications and Postal Services	2014–2019	Minister of Telecommunications and Postal Services	Created when split from the Department of Communications in 2014, and merged back into that department in 2019, creating the Department of Communications and Digital Technologies.
Department of Provincial and Local Government (until 2009) Department of Cooperative Governance and Traditional Affairs (2009)	Until 2009	Minister of Provincial and Local Government Minister of Cooperative Governance and Traditional Affairs	After being renamed briefly, divided in 2009 into the Department of Cooperative Governance and the Department of Traditional Affairs.
Finance
Department of Finance	Until 2000	Minister of Finance	Merged to create the National Treasury in 2000.
Department of State Expenditure	Until 2000	Minister of Finance	Merged to create the National Treasury in 2000.
Arts, recreation, and science
Department of Arts, Culture, Science and Technology	Until 2004	Minister of Arts, Culture, Science and Technology	Divided into the Department of Arts and Culture and the Department of Science and Technology (later renamed the Department of Science and Innovation) in 2004.
Department of Arts and Culture	2004–2019	Minister of Arts and Culture	Merged to create the Department of Sports, Arts and Culture in 2019.
Department of Sport and Recreation	Until 2019	Minister of Sport and Recreation	Merged to create the Department of Sports, Arts and Culture in 2019.
Minerals and energy
Department of Mineral and Energy Affairs (until 1998) Department of Minerals and Energy (1998–2009)	1994–2009	Minister of Minerals and Energy	Split into the Department of Mineral Resources and the Department of Energy.
Department of Mineral Resources	2009–2019	Minister of Mineral Resources	Merged in 2019, creating the Department of Mineral Resources and Energy.
Department of Energy	2009–2019	Minister of Energy	Merged in 2019, creating the Department of Mineral Resources and Energy.
Department of Mineral Resources and Energy	2019–2024	Minister of Mineral Resources and Energy	Split into the Department of Electricity and Energy and the Department of Mineral and Petroleum Resources.
Environment, land, and agriculture
Department of Environmental Affairs and Tourism	Until 2009	Minister of Environmental Affairs and Tourism	Divided into the Department of Environmental Affairs and the Department of Tourism in 2009.
Department of Water Affairs and Forestry	Until 2009	Minister of Water Affairs and Forestry	Divided in 2009: the water section became the Department of Water Affairs (later renamed the Department of Water and Sanitation), and the forestry section merged with the Department of Agriculture to create the Department of Agriculture, Forestry and Fisheries.
Department of Agriculture	Until 2009	Minister of Agriculture	Merged with the forestry section of the Department of Water Affairs and Forestry and the fisheries section of the Department of Environmental Affairs and Tourism in 2009, to create the Department of Agriculture, Forestry and Fisheries.
Department of Agriculture, Forestry and Fisheries	2009–2019	Minister of Agriculture, Forestry and Fisheries	Divided in 2019: one section merged with the Department of Rural Development and Land Reform to become the Department of Agriculture, Land Reform and Rural Development; the other merged with the Department of Environmental Affairs to become the Department of Environment, Forestry and Fisheries.
Department of Environmental Affairs	2009–2019	Minister of Environmental Affairs	Merged with the forestry and fisheries section of the Department of Agriculture, Forestry and Fisheries in 2019, creating the Department of Environment, Forestry and Fisheries.
Department of Land Affairs (Until 2009) Department of Rural Development and Land Reform (2009–2019)	Until 2019	Minister of Land Affairs Minister of Rural Development and Land Reform	Merged with the agriculture section of the Department of Environmental Affairs in 2019, creating the Department of Agriculture, Land Reform and Rural Development.
Department of Agriculture, Land Reform and Rural Development	2019–2024	Minister of Agriculture, Land Reform and Rural Development	Divided into the Department of Agriculture and the Department of Land Reform and Rural Development.
Intelligence
National Intelligence Agency	Until 2009	Minister of Intelligence Services	Merged in 2009 to create the State Security Agency.
South African Secret Service	Until 2009	Minister of Intelligence Services	Merged in 2009 to create the State Security Agency.
South African National Academy of Intelligence	Until 2009	Minister of Intelligence Services	Merged in 2009 to create the State Security Agency.

=== New departments ===
Presidents of South Africa may create new government departments. In 2009, the Department of Women, Children and People with Disabilities (later the Department of Women, Youth and Persons with Disabilities) was created. Later that year (after the Department of Defence had briefly been renamed the Department of Defence and Military Veterans), the Department of Military Veterans was created. And, in 2014, the Department of Small Business Development was created.

== See also ==
- Cabinet of South Africa
