= Parks Tau =

South African politician (born 1970)

The Honourable Parks Tau MP
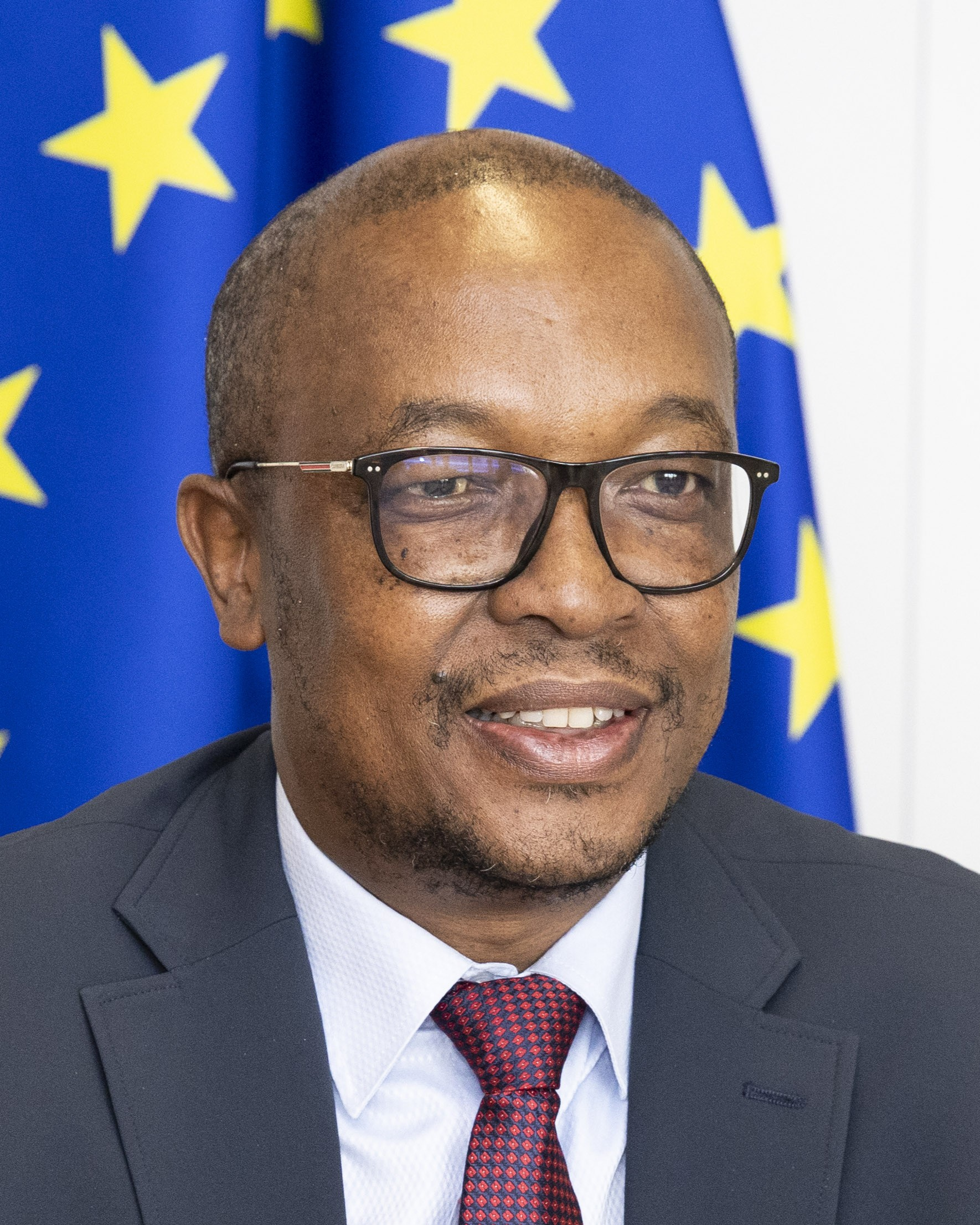
- Tau in May 2026

Minister of Trade, Industry and Competition
- Incumbent
- Assumed office 3 July 2024
- President: Cyril Ramaphosa
- Deputy: Zuko Godlimpi (3 July 2024-); Andrew Whitfield; (3 July 2024 – 26 June 2025), Alexandra Abrahams (17 Nov 2025-)
- Preceded by: Ebrahim Patel

Deputy Minister of Cooperative Governance and Traditional Affairs
- In office 7 March 2023 – 19 June 2024 Serving with Zolile Burns-Ncamashe
- President: Cyril Ramaphosa
- Minister: Thembi Nkadimeng
- Preceded by: Thembi Nkadimeng
- Succeeded by: Dickson Masemola
- In office 29 May 2019 – 9 December 2020 Serving with Obed Bapela
- President: Cyril Ramaphosa
- Minister: Nkosazana Dlamini-Zuma
- Preceded by: Andries Nel
- Succeeded by: Thembi Nkadimeng

Member of the Gauteng Executive Council for Economic Development
- In office 9 December 2020 – 6 October 2022
- Premier: David Makhura
- Preceded by: Morakane Mosupyoe
- Succeeded by: Tasneem Motara

Mayor of Johannesburg
- In office 26 May 2011 – 22 August 2016
- Preceded by: Amos Masondo
- Succeeded by: Herman Mashaba

Personal details
- Born: Mpho Parks Franklyn Tau; 6 June 1970 (age 56) Orlando West, Soweto; Transvaal, South Africa
- Party: African National Congress
- Spouse: Pilisiwe Twala-Tau
- Education: University of London

Mpho Parks Franklyn Tau (born 1970) is a South African politician from Gauteng. He has been the Minister of Trade, Industry and Competition since July 2024. A member of the African National Congress (ANC), he was the second post-apartheid Mayor of Johannesburg between 2011 and 2016.

Born and raised in Soweto, Tau joined the City of Johannesburg Metropolitan Council upon its inception in December 2000 and represented the ANC as a councillor until May 2019. He was elected as mayor in the May 2011 local elections but served only one term: though some observers admired Tau's technocratic policies, the ANC lost its electoral majority in the city in the August 2016 local elections. Tau remained in the council on the opposition benches for three years thereafter, serving as leader of the ANC caucus as well as leader of both the South African Local Government Association and United Cities and Local Governments.

After the May 2019 general election, Tau joined the national executive as Deputy Minister of Cooperative Governance and Traditional Affairs. He served two non-consecutive stints in that office, from May 2019 to December 2020 and later from March 2023 to June 2024; in the interim, he served in the Gauteng Executive Council as provincial minister for economic development under Premier David Makhura. He was elevated to his current ministerial portfolio after the May 2024 general election.

In December 2022, Tau was elected to a five-year term as a member of the ANC's National Executive Committee. He formerly served in party leadership positions at both the local and provincial levels, notably as party chairman in Johannesburg between 2011 and 2018 and then as provincial treasurer in Gauteng between 2018 and 2022.

== Early life and education ==
Tau was born on 6 June 1970 in the Orlando West neighbourhood of Soweto, where he grew up. A teenager during the last decade of apartheid, he became involved in political activism as a high school student at Pace Commercial College in Soweto, where he was president of the student representative council. He became president of the Soweto Youth Congress in 1989 and was also active in the Congress of South African Students and African National Congress (ANC) Youth League.

Later in his life, Tau studied public management at Regenesys Business School, and he holds a master's degree in public policy and management from the University of London.

== Local government ==
Tau became regional secretary of the Johannesburg branch of the governing ANC in 1994, shortly after the onset of the post-apartheid transition. Thereafter, he joined Johannesburg's transitional Southern Local Metropolitan Council as a representative of the ANC; aged 25, he became chairperson of the council's urban development committee and deputy chairperson of its executive committee.

=== Mayoral committee: 2000–2011 ===
The unified City of Johannesburg Metropolitan Municipality was launched in 2000, and Tau became a local councillor in the new municipality, representing the ANC, after the December 2000 local elections. For the next decade, Tau served as a Member of the Mayoral Committee (MMC) under the inaugural mayor, Amos Masondo; he was appointed as MMC for Development Planning, Transportation, and Environment in 2000 and went on to serve as MMC for Finance and Economic Development between 2003 and 2011. In 2009, he was elected to the Gauteng ANC's Provincial Executive Committee.

The Mail & Guardian later reported that Tau's wife was a minority shareholder in a black economic empowerment (BEE) consortium that also included a company, Regiments Capital, that had received state contracts from the Gauteng treasury. The newspaper suggested that Tau, as political head of the treasury, had ignored an improper conflict of interest. Public integrity commissioner Jules Browde investigated the allegations after they were published in 2012, and he reportedly concluded in 2013 that Tau had lacked any influence over the relevant tender processes.

=== Mayor of Johannesburg: 2011–2016 ===
Ahead of the 18 May 2011 local elections, Tau was the ANC's candidate in Johannesburg, touted to succeed Masondo as Mayor of Johannesburg. The ANC retained a comfortable majority of seats in the city council, and Tau was elected as mayor in the inaugural council meeting on 26 May, easily defeating a challenge from Mmusi Maimane of the opposition Democratic Alliance (DA). In October 2011, Tau was additionally elected as regional chairperson of the ANC's Johannesburg branch, again succeeding Masondo.

As mayor Tau was viewed as a technocrat. In his 2013 State of the City address, he introduced his so-called Corridors of Freedom agenda, which involved redressing apartheid-era spatial inequalities through inclusionary public transport, including continued expansion of the Rea Vaya bus rapid transit system. The policy was popular among some observers, but others criticized its conceptualization or implementation. Tau's 2015 State of the City address set out plans for transforming Johannesburg into a smart city, including through public Wi-Fi networks and "smart" pre-paid electricity meters. Tau also committed to major infrastructure investments and launched the Jozi@Work employment scheme.

In the next local elections in August 2016, Tau stood for re-election as the ANC's mayoral candidate, although some segments of the regional party suggested fielding an alternative candidate. But the ANC's vote share declined precipitously in the election: it remained the largest party on the Johannesburg council but lost its majority, winning only 45 per cent of the vote. At the inaugural council meeting on 23 August, the DA's Herman Mashaba was elected as mayor, receiving 144 votes to Tau's 125; decisive for the DA's victory was the support of the Economic Freedom Fighters.

=== Leader of the opposition: 2016–2019 ===
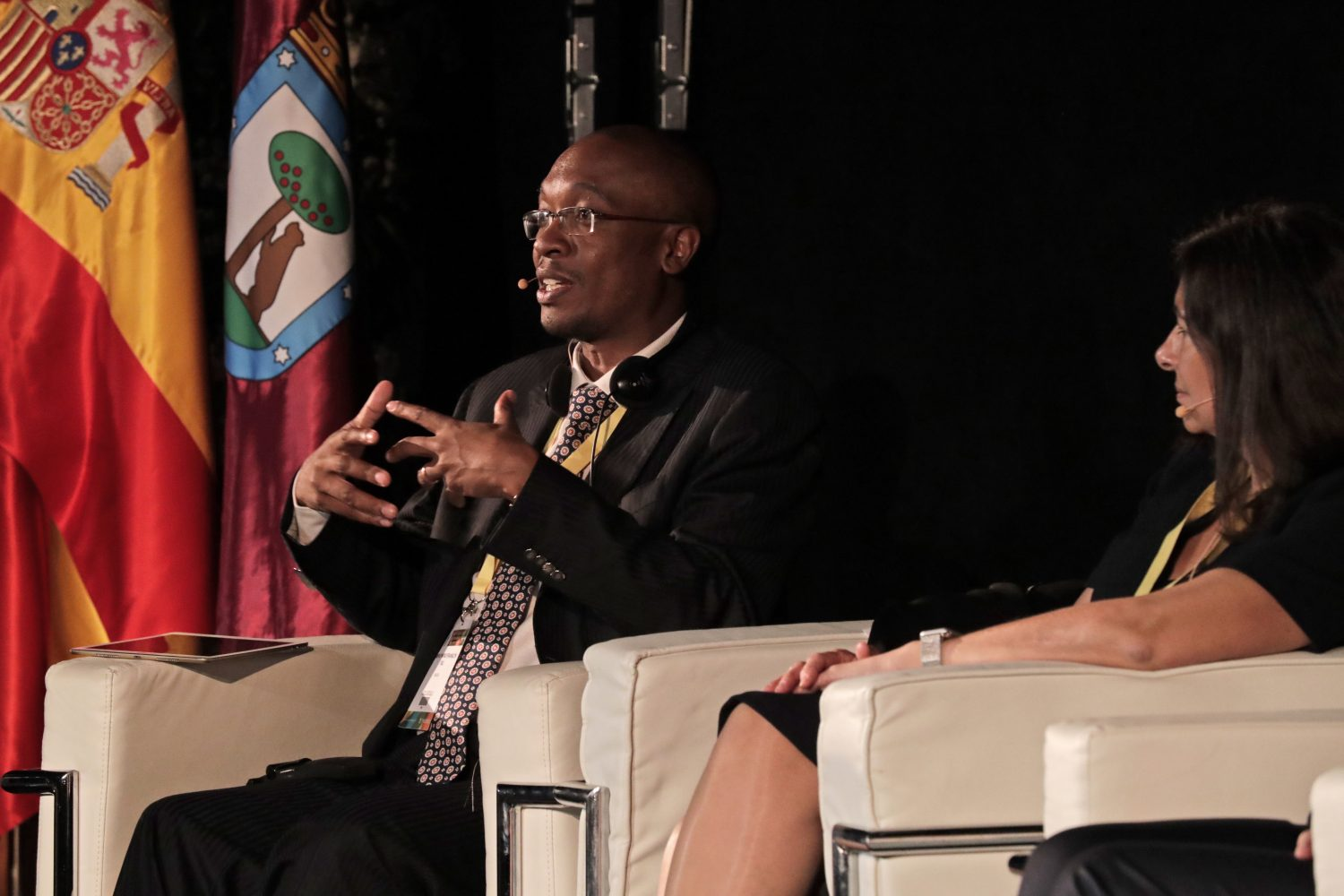
Tau at the World Forum on Urban Violence in Madrid, Spain in April 2017

After his defeat in August 2016, Tau remained in the Johannesburg city council as leader of the ANC caucus and leader of the opposition. He also became national chairperson of the South African Local Government Association in October 2016, a position he held until June 2019. During the same three-year period he was president of the United Cities and Local Governments.

On 1 July 2018, Tau ceded the position of ANC regional chairperson in Johannesburg to Geoff Makhubo. The party said that Tau had not stood for re-election because he was planning to pursue elevation to the party's provincial leadership at the upcoming provincial ANC conference, to be held in Irene on 21 July. Although he was nominated to stand for election as the provincial party's deputy chairman, the conference elected him as provincial treasurer instead. The Mail & Guardian reported that he stepped out of the deputy leadership race after making a deal with supporters of Panyaza Lesufi, who won the deputy chairman position.

== Provincial and national government ==
=== National executive: 2019–2020 ===
Tau was elected to the Gauteng Provincial Legislature in the May 2019 general election, and he resigned from the Johannesburg City Council to take up his legislative seat. However, though initially slated for appointment to a portfolio in the Gauteng Executive Council, Tau was excluded from the provincial executive announced by premier David Makhura shortly after the election. Instead, on 29 May, after just over a week in the provincial legislature, Tau was elevated to the national executive, appointed by President Cyril Ramaphosa as Deputy Minister of Cooperative Governance and Traditional Affairs. He was the only deputy minister appointed from outside the national Parliament.

=== Gauteng executive: 2020–2022 ===
In December 2020, Gauteng premier Makhura announced a reshuffle of his provincial executive, in which Tau was appointed as Member of the Executive Council (MEC) for Economic Development. He resigned from the national executive to take up the position and was sworn back in to a seat in the Gauteng Provincial Legislature. The provincial ANC Youth League reportedly opposed Tau's return to provincial politics.

Tau's term as ANC provincial treasurer ended at the party's provincial conference in June 2022, where Morakane Mosupyoe was elected to succeed him. Tau was not included in the party Provincial Executive Committee as elected at the conference, which led to speculation that he would be removed from the Gauteng Executive Council. After Panyaza Lesufi replaced Makhura as premier in October 2022, he sacked Tau as MEC for Economic Development, appointing Tasneem Motara in his stead.

Tau retained his legislative seat and was subsequently made chairperson of the legislature's finance committee. In addition, in December 2022, he attended the ANC's 55th National Conference and was elected to a five-year term as a member of the party's National Executive Committee. The committee in turn elected him to chair its subcommittee on local government intervention.

=== Return to national government: 2023–present ===
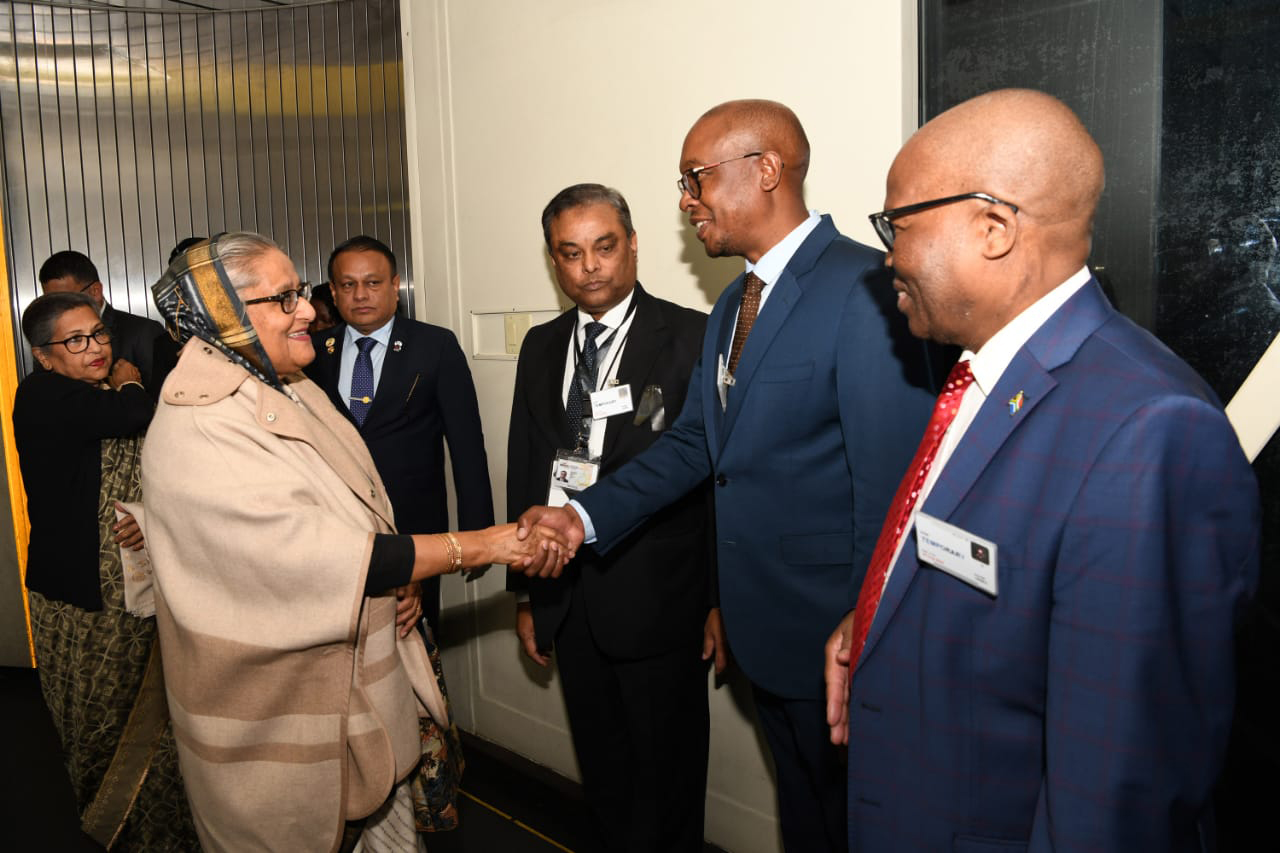
Tau receiving Bangladesh Prime Minister Sheikh Hasina at O. R. Tambo International Airport ahead of the BRICS Summit in August 2023

On 26 January 2023, the Sunday Times reported that Tau had resigned abruptly from his seat in the Gauteng Provincial Legislature. He was sworn in to a seat in the National Assembly of South Africa on 6 February, sparking rumors that he would be promoted to the national executive in an impending cabinet reshuffle. When the reshuffle was announced on 6 March, President Ramaphosa returned Tau to his former position as Deputy Minister of Cooperative Governance and Traditional Affairs.

In the next general election in May 2024, Tau stood for election to a full term in the National Assembly, but was initially ranked too low on the ANC's party list (74th) to win a seat. He was sworn in shortly after Parliament opened, on 19 June, when a casual vacancy arose. On 30 June, he was appointed as Minister of Trade, Industry and Competition in President Ramaphosa's ANC-led coalition government. Andrew Whitfield and Zuko Godlimpi, of the DA and ANC respectively, were named as his deputies.

== Personal life ==
He is married to Pilisiwe Twala-Tau, who trained as an accountant and also worked in the Johannesburg government. They have children.
