= Department of Traditional Affairs =

South African government department

Department overview
- Formed: December 1, 2009; 16 years ago
- Preceding department: Department of Cooperative Governance and Traditional Affairs
- Jurisdiction: Government of South Africa
- Headquarters: Pencardia 1, 509 Pretorius Street, Arcadia, Pretoria; 25.747°S 28.205°E
- Employees: 95 (2018/19)
- Annual budget: R173.4 million (2020/21)
- Minister responsible: Nkosazana Dlamini-Zuma, Minister of Cooperative Governance and Traditional Affairs
- Deputy Minister responsible: Obed Bapela Thembi Nkadimeng, Deputy Minister of Traditional Affairs
- Website: www.cogta.gov.za?services=department-of-traditional-affairs-dta

The Department of Traditional Affairs (DTA) is a department of the South African government, responsible for overseeing the traditional leadership of South Africa's indigenous communities. Along with the Department of Cooperative Governance, it is within the political responsibility of the Minister of Cooperative Governance and Traditional Affairs (CoGTA), who is assisted by a Deputy Minister of Traditional Affairs. As of October 2024 the minister is Velenkosini Hlabisa and his deputies are Dickson Masemola and Zolile Burns-Ncamashe.

In the 2020 budget, R173.4 million was appropriated for the department. In the 2018/19 financial year it had 95 employees.
