= Intergovernmental relations in South Africa =

Intergovernmental relations in South Africa take place in a framework of a unitary state with 3 tiers of government: national, provincial, and municipal.

== Chapter Three of the Constitution ==
Chapter 3 of the Constitution of South Africa spells out a description of co-operation between the different tiers of government where each tier has a distinct set of responsibilities which must be respected, and where each tier must not assume a power or function except those conferred on them in terms of the constitution.

== Fiscal intergovernmental relations ==
Central government is largely responsibility for maintaining the finances of the municipalities.

Infrastructure spending had an impact on local employment and economic growth, which was found to be statistically significant positive. There have been failures relating to the management and maintenance of infrastructure projects.

In 2002, there was a large imbalance between the income/expenditures - the national government's income is 2.3 times larger than its expenditure whereas total provincial governments' income was 27 times smaller than its expenditure.

== Relationships between different tiers ==
All three tiers meet through the President's Coordinating Council.

=== Relationship between the national government and the provincial governments ===
The national government and provincial government meet through "Minister and Members of Executive Council" meetings The Minister of Cooperative Governance and Traditional Affairs facilitates the relationship between the national and provincial governments.

=== Relationship between the provincial governments and their municipalities ===
The provincial governments meet their municipalities through "premiers' intergovernmental forums". For each province, municipalities co-ordinate their policies through chapters of the South African Local Government Association.

=== Relationship between the national government and the municipalities ===
The national government distributes significant funding to municipalities. The Minister of Cooperative Governance and Traditional Affairs facilitates the relationship between the national and local governments. The South African Local Government Association coordinates policies between municipalities.

=== Relationship between the district municipalities and their local municipalities ===
The district municipalities and their local municipalities meet through district local government.

== Relationships within tiers ==
=== Relationships between the provinces ===
The provincial governments may coordinate their policies through interprovincial forums. but they may also raise disputes in the supreme court.

=== Relationships between the municipalities ===
The South African Local Government Association coordinates policies between municipalities. IRFA allows for inter-municipal disputes to be raised in the official court.

== Intergovernmental Relations Framework Act, 2005 ==
Intergovernmental Relations Framework Act

Parliament of South Africa
- Long title: To establish a framework for the national government, provincial governments and local governments to promote and facilitate intergovernmental relations; to provide for mechanisms and procedures to facilitate the settlement of intergovernmental disputes; and to provide for matters connected therewith.
- Citation: No. 13 of 2005
- Territorial extent: South Africa
- Assented to: 2005-08-15
- Commenced: 2005-08-15

Legislative history
- Bill title: Intergovernmental Relations Framework Bill
- Bill citation: No. 825
- Status: In force

In 2005, the Intergovernmental Relations Framework Act was introduced to establish a greater degree of predictability in intergovernmental relations and to provide increased alignment of plans and expenditures of the different tiers of government.

The IRFA allows for a declaration of an intergovernmental financial dispute.

The District Development Model is anchored in the IRFA. In 2024, views were sought by the government on a proposed bill, which would seek to amend the Intergovernmental Relations Framework Act to create more intergovernmental coordination bodies.

IRFA allows for inter-municipal and inter-provincial disputes to be raised in the official court as well as disputes between the provincial and national governments.

The approach established by the Act has been described as "top-down" and has been characterised as ineffective as currently implemented, but several improvements have been suggested.

=== Uses of the Act ===
Eskom was found to not be allowed to use the Act to cut off electricity from municipalities, until it had taken all other reasonable steps.

== Sister/twin cities and provinces ==
Municipality and provincial governments maintain sister or twin relations with counterparts in other countries.
