= 2031 South African municipal elections =

- TBD

All councillors for all 8 metropolitan municipalities All councillors for all 205 local municipalities 40% of councillors for all 44 district municipalities
- Registered: 29,230,808 (2026)
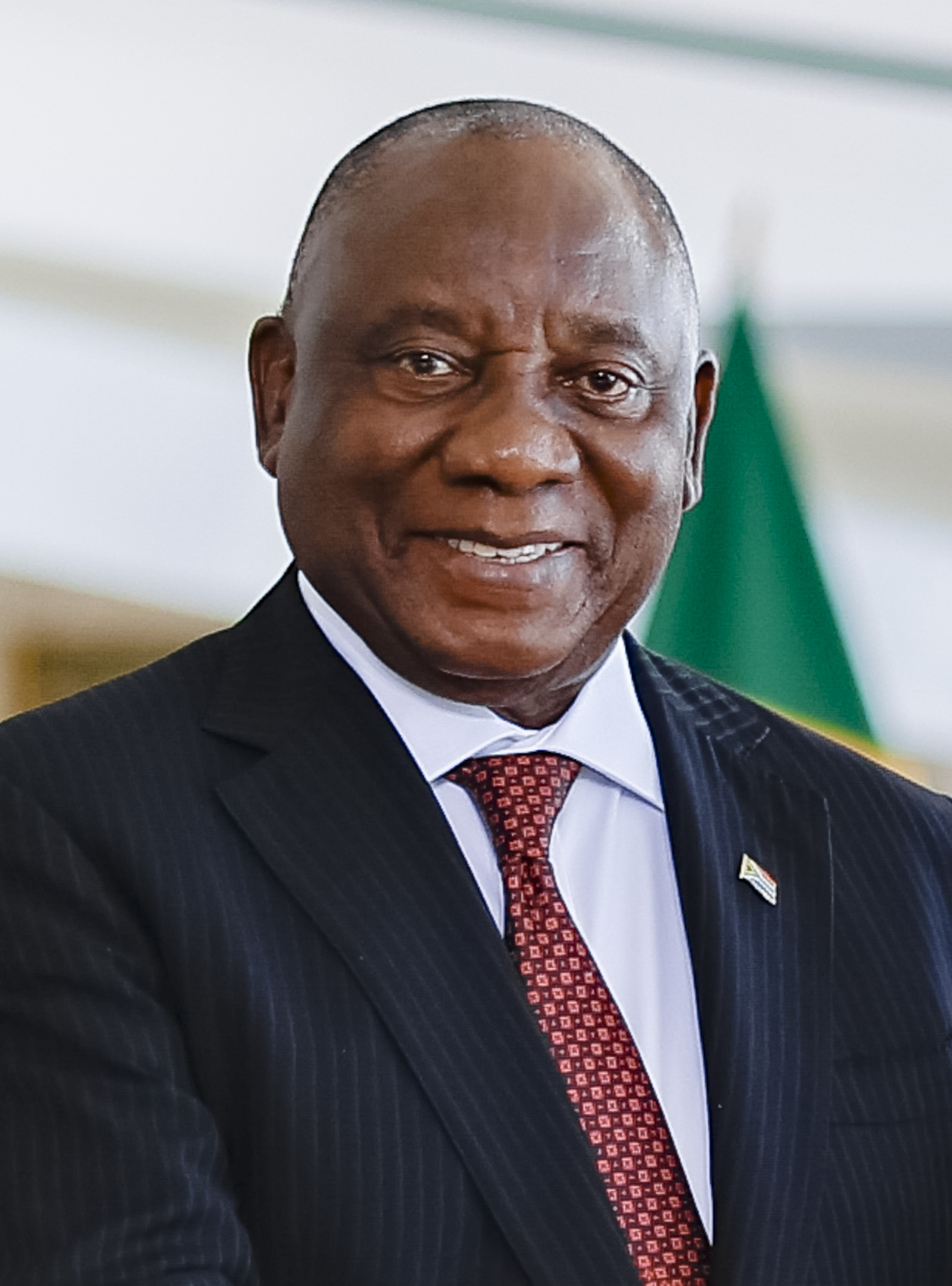

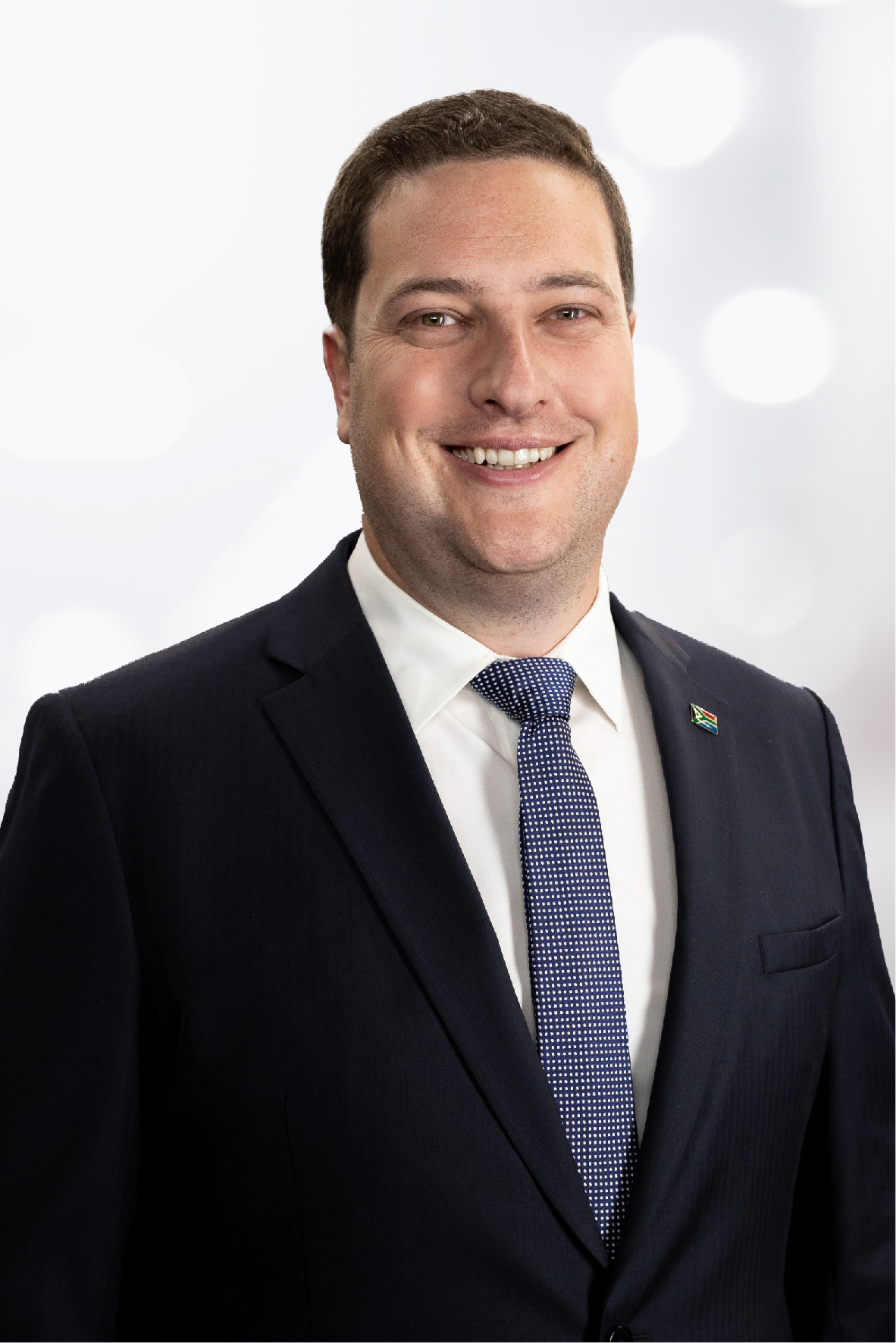

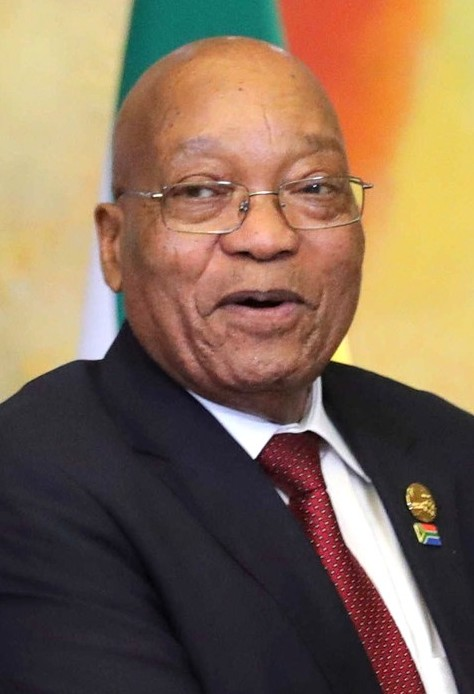

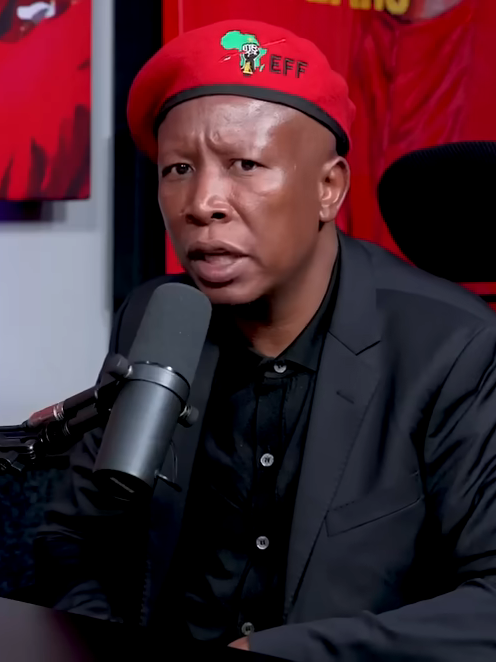

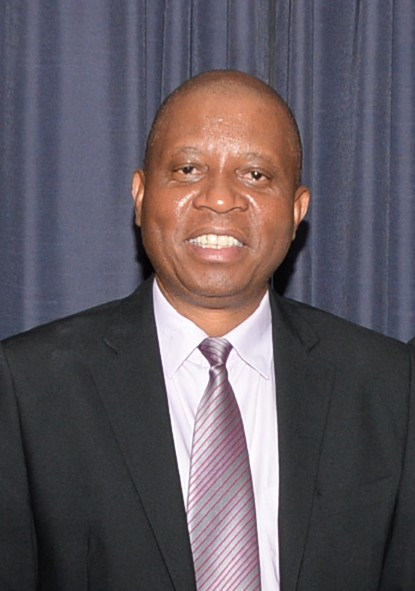

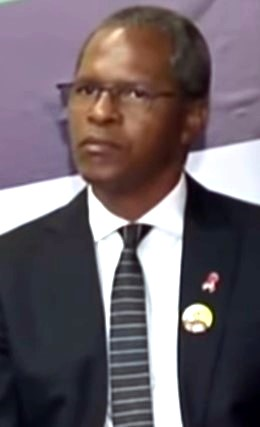

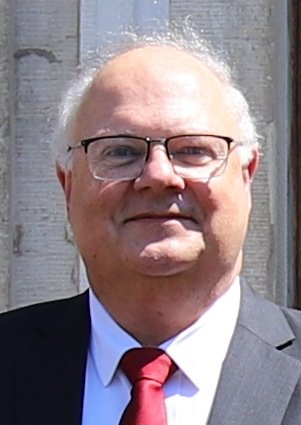

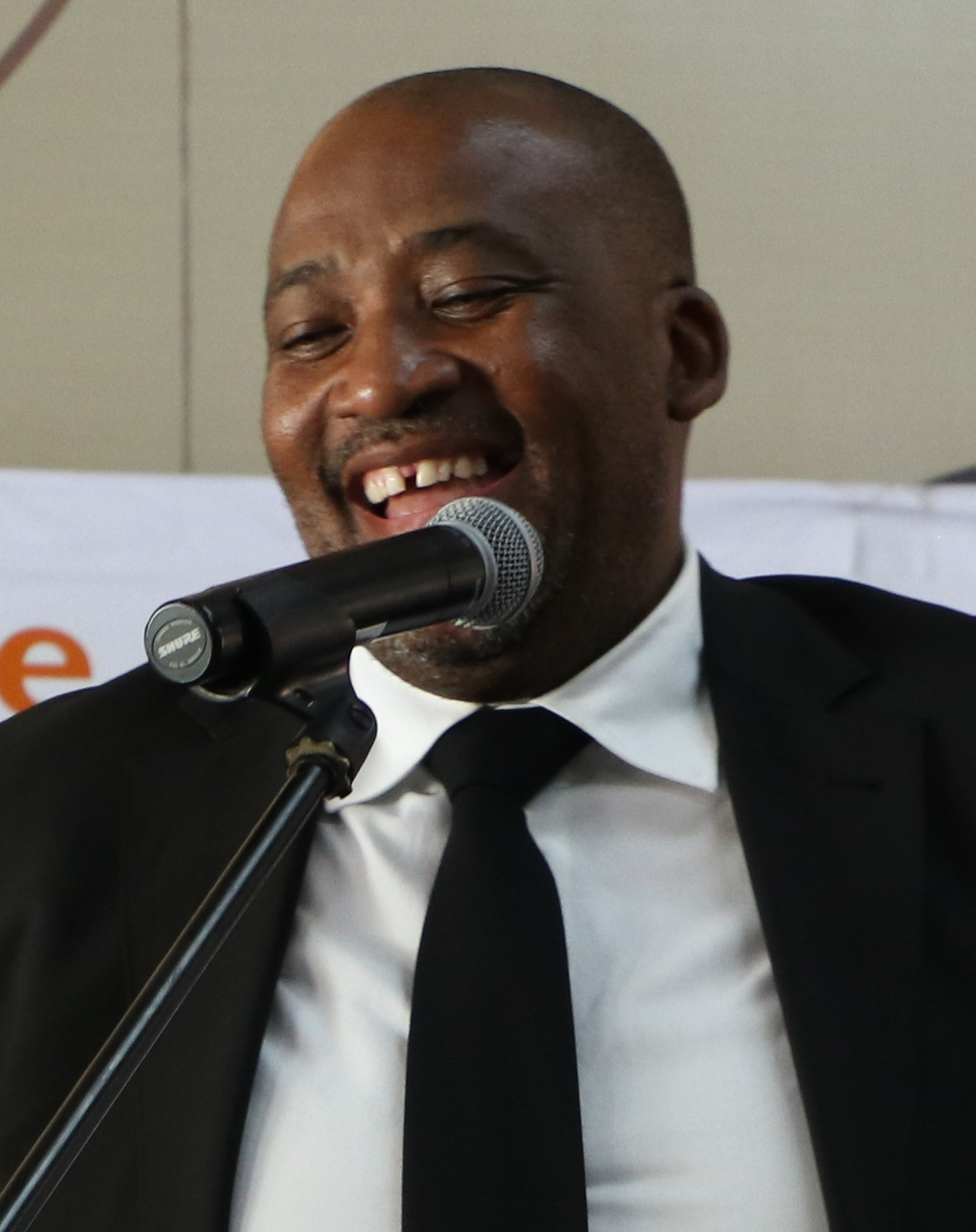
	First party	Second party	Third party
Leader	Cyril Ramaphosa	Geordin Hill-Lewis	Jacob Zuma
Party	ANC	DA	MK
Last election	30.76%	24.64%	9.76%
	Fourth party	Fifth party	Sixth party
Leader	Julius Malema	Herman Mashaba	Velenkosini Hlabisa
Party	EFF	ActionSA	IFP
Last election	6.22%	5.67%	4.69%
	Seventh party	Eighth party	Ninth party
Leader	Corné Mulder	Solly Mapaila	Gayton McKenzie
Party	VF+	SACP	PA
Last election	2.99%	2.38%	1.98%

The 2031 South African municipal elections will be held between 5 November 2031 and 2 February 2032 across South Africa, to elect councils for all district, metropolitan and local municipalities in each of the country's nine provinces.

The most recent local elections were held on 4 November 2026. Per Section 159 of the Constitution, municipal councils may serve no longer than five years and that elections must be conducted within 90 days after their terms expire. Section 24 of the Local Government: Municipal Structures Act, 1998 specifies that the five-year term is calculated from the day following the previous local election. It requires the Minister of Cooperative Governance and Traditional Affairs to proclaim the election date, after consulting the Electoral Commission of South Africa (IEC).

== Background ==
As with all major governmental elections in South Africa, the 2031 municipal elections will be organized by the country's independent election management body, the Electoral Commission (IEC). This is as per the body's establishment under chapter nine of the Constitution, and as per its obligations in Section 190 of the Constitution, and duties in Section 5 of the Electoral Commission Act, 1996.

=== Electoral Commission activities ===
==== Wards ====
For municipal elections, South African voters submit ballots within their ward, which is based on the area in which they primarily reside (and therefore register to vote in). Voters are represented by a particular Ward Councillor, who may or may not have an affiliation with a political party.

Municipal ward boundary demarcations are determined by an independent agency - the Municipal Demarcation Board (MDB). Around a year prior to elections, the MDB publishes its draft boundaries. There is then a 14-day period to challenge these formally, as well as a public consultation process. Subsequently, the MDB hands over the final demarcations to the Electoral Commission.

== Voters ==
=== Registration ===
South Africans register to vote once, and remain on the voters' roll indefinitely. Citizens can update their personal details, such as submit a change of address, via an online portal run by the Electoral Commission. Voters register where they live primarily, and vote at a voting station allocated to them, based on their area of registration. Voters can also request to vote from elsewhere, such as if they are on holiday in another city.

== Electoral system ==
Local government in South Africa consists of municipalities of various types. The largest metropolitan areas are governed by metropolitan municipalities, while the rest of the country is divided into district municipalities, each of which consists of several local municipalities. After the 2016 elections, there were eight metropolitan municipalities, 44 district municipalities and 205 local municipalities.

The councils of metropolitan and local municipalities are elected through a system of mixed-member proportional representation, in which half of the seats in each municipality are elected on the first-past-the-post system in single-member wards and the other half of the seats are allocated according to the proportional representation (PR) system.

The latter takes into account the number of ward seats won by a party and ensures that the final number of seats held by that party is proportional to their percentage of the total vote.

District municipality councils are partly elected by proportional representation (DC 40% votes) and partly appointed by the councils of the constituent local municipalities (DC 60% votes). Voters in both metropolitan and local municipalities elect a single ward candidate as well as a proportional representative in their municipal council.

Residents of municipalities that form part of district councils (that is, excluding metropolitan municipalities) also cast a third vote to elect a proportional representative for their district council in addition to the two votes they cast for their local council.

== Political parties ==
A total of 620 political parties registered to contest the previous local elections, held in 2026. Updated party registrations will be announced by the Electoral Commission prior to the 2031 elections.

== Timeline ==
=== 2026 ===
- 4 November 2026: The 2026 municipal elections took place across South Africa, with a 52.3% turnout – an increase of 6.4%.
