= Department of Cooperative Governance =

South African government department

Department overview
- Formed: December 1, 2009; 16 years ago
- Preceding department: Department of Cooperative Governance and Traditional Affairs
- Jurisdiction: Government of South Africa
- Headquarters: 87 Hamilton Street, Arcadia, Pretoria; 25.742°S 28.205°E
- Employees: 451 (2018/19)
- Annual budget: R 135.01 billion (2026/27)
- Minister responsible: Velenkosini Hlabisa, Minister of Cooperative Governance and Traditional Affairs
- Deputy Minister responsible: Parks Tau, Deputy Minister of Local Government
- Website: www.cogta.gov.za

The Department of Cooperative Governance (DCoG) is a department of the South African government, responsible for the relationship between the national government and the provincial governments and municipalities as well as disaster management. Along with the Department of Traditional Affairs, it is within the political responsibility of the Minister of Cooperative Governance and Traditional Affairs (CoGTA), who is assisted by a Deputy Minister of Local Government. As of August 2020 the minister is Nkosazana Dlamini-Zuma and her deputy is Parks Tau.

In the 2020 budget, R96,234 million was appropriated for the department, of which transfers and subsidies to provincial and local governments made up R91,272.8 million. In the 2018/19 financial year it had 451 employees.

The vision of the Department of Cooperative Governance is the realisation of an efficient and effective cooperative governance system that enables resilient, safe, sustainable, prosperous, cohesive, connected and climate smart communities. To this end, the Department's mission is to lead the Cooperative Governance System in support of integrated planning and implementation across all spheres of government.
