= Mncwango =

Mncwango is a surname. Notable people with the surname include:

- Albert Mncwango (born 1953), South African politician
- Zwakele Mncwango (born 1978), South African politician
