= Sicelo Shiceka =

South African politician (1966–2012)

Minister of Cooperative Governance and Traditional Affairs
- In office 11 May 2009 – 24 October 2011
- President: Jacob Zuma
- Deputy: Yunus Carrim
- Preceded by: Himself (for Provincial and Local Government)
- Succeeded by: Richard Baloyi

Minister of Provincial and Local Government
- In office 25 September 2008 – 10 May 2009
- President: Kgalema Motlanthe
- Deputy: Nomatyala Hangana
- Preceded by: Sydney Mufamadi
- Succeeded by: Himself (for Cooperative Governance and Traditional Affairs)

Personal details
- Born: 8 June 1966 Ingquza Hill, Cape Province; South Africa
- Died: 30 April 2012 (aged 45) Mthatha, Eastern Cape
- Party: African National Congress
- Children: Mthunzi Shiceka, Andile Shiceka

Sicelo Shiceka (8 June 1966 – 30 April 2012) was a South African politician who served as Minister of Cooperative Governance and Traditional Affairs from May 2009 until his death in April 2012. Before that, he was the Minister of Provincial and Local Government from September 2008 and May 2009. Throughout his service in the cabinet, he represented the African National Congress (ANC) in the National Assembly.

Born in rural Eastern Cape, Shiceka entered politics as an anti-apartheid activist in Johannesburg and Soweto. After the end of apartheid in 1994, he represented the ANC in the Gauteng Provincial Legislature from 1994 to 2004 and in the National Council of Provinces from 2004 to 2008. A political ally to Jacob Zuma, he was elected to the ANC's National Executive Committee in December 2007.

== Early life and education ==
Shiceka was born on 8 June 1966 in Ingquza Hill, a village near Flagstaff in the former Cape Province (present-day Eastern Cape). His father died before he was born, and his mother, a nurse, moved to Johannesburg to find work while he was still an infant. He grew up with extended family in Ingquza Hill, attending Mhlanga Primary School in nearby Lusikisiki. In 1979, he joined his mother in Johannesburg and enrolled at Jabulani Junior Secondary School in Soweto. However, he matriculated at the Inanda High School in Durban, where he lived with his sister.

In later years he completed a diploma in economics at the Wharton School in Pennsylvania, United States and a diploma in labour relations at Witwatersrand University. He also studied towards, but did not complete, a master's degree in political economy at the University of the Free State; the degree was falsely listed on his official résumé until 2010.

== Anti-apartheid activism ==
Shiceka's political influences included his grandfather and uncle, who were both anti-apartheid activists; the former died in exile after participating in the 1960 Pondo revolt, and the latter died in exile after joining Umkhonto we Sizwe. Shiceka himself became active in anti-apartheid politics as a high school student in Soweto, and he was elected as chairperson of the Soweto branch of the Congress of South African Students in 1980.

When he returned to Soweto after high school, he resumed his political activity, becoming a leading figure in the Azanian Students' Organisation, an affiliate of the Azanian People's Organisation (AZAPO). In 1987 he was shot and badly wounded in an apparent assassination attempt. In 1989 he joined the burgeoning trade union movement, recruited as an organiser for the Paper, Printing, Wood and Allied Workers' Union, an affiliate of the Congress of South African Trade Unions (COSATU). He was elected as the union's provincial secretary in PWV the following year.

As political restrictions were lifted during the negotiations to end apartheid, Shiceka became overtly involved in structures of the Tripartite Alliance. From 1991, he chaired a branch of the South African Communist Party in downtown Johannesburg; from 1992 he was provincial secretary of COSATU; and from 1993 he was deputy chairperson of the Kyalami regional branch of the African National Congress (ANC).

== Post-apartheid political career ==
=== Gauteng Provincial Legislature: 1994–2004 ===
In South Africa's first post-apartheid elections in April 1994, Shiceka was elected to represent the ANC in the newly established Gauteng Provincial Legislature. Gauteng Premier Tokyo Sexwale also appointed him to the Gauteng Executive Council as Member of the Executive Council (MEC) for Development Planning and Local Government. He served a full five-year term in that position. During that time, in 1996, he was elected for the first time to the ANC's Provincial Executive Committee.

After Shiceka's re-election to the provincial legislature in the June 1999 general election, newly elected Premier Sam Shilowa declined to re-appoint him to the Executive Council; Trevor Fowler replaced him as MEC. Critics accused Shilowa of "purging" the Executive Council of those who, like Shiceka, were viewed as political allies of his rival, Mathole Motshekga. During the provincial legislature's second term, Shiceka served instead as chairperson of the legislature's committee on safety and security.

=== National Council of Provinces: 2004–2008 ===
In the April 2004 general election, Shiceka was elected to his third term in the Gauteng Provincial Legislature. However, during its first sitting, the provincial legislature elected him as one of its permanent delegates to the National Council of Provinces, the upper house of the South African Parliament. In the National Council of Provinces, he chaired the Select Committee on Local Government, Constitutional Development and Administration.

Midway through the parliamentary term, in December 2007, Shiceka attended the ANC's 52nd National Conference in Polokwane, where Jacob Zuma was elected as ANC president. Shiceka was regarded as one of Zuma's key supporters in Gauteng. At the same conference, he was himself elected to a five-year term as a member of the party's National Executive Committee; by number of votes received, he was ranked 61st of the 80 ordinary members elected to the committee. He was appointed as deputy chairperson of the National Executive Committee's subcommittee on legislation and governance; under his leadership, the subcommittee developed a proposal to reconfigure government cabinet clusters. In addition, in January 2008, he was appointed to the powerful political committee of the ANC's parliamentary caucus.

=== Cabinet of South Africa: 2008–2011 ===
In September 2008, Thabo Mbeki resigned as the President of South Africa, precipitating a wave of subsidiary resignations and necessitating a major reshuffle. Announcing his cabinet on 25 September, Mbeki's successor, President Kgalema Motlanthe, appointed Shiceka to succeed Sydney Mufamadi as Minister of Provincial and Local Government. Nomatyala Hangana was named as his deputy. In order to take up the ministerial office, Shiceka resigned from the National Council of Provinces on 25 September and was sworn in to a seat in the National Assembly later the same day. He filled the seat in the lower house's Gauteng caucus that had been vacated by Jabu Moleketi's resignation, and Dikeledi Tsotetsi was appointed to fill his former seat in the upper house. Aged 42, Shiceka became the youngest minister in the cabinet.

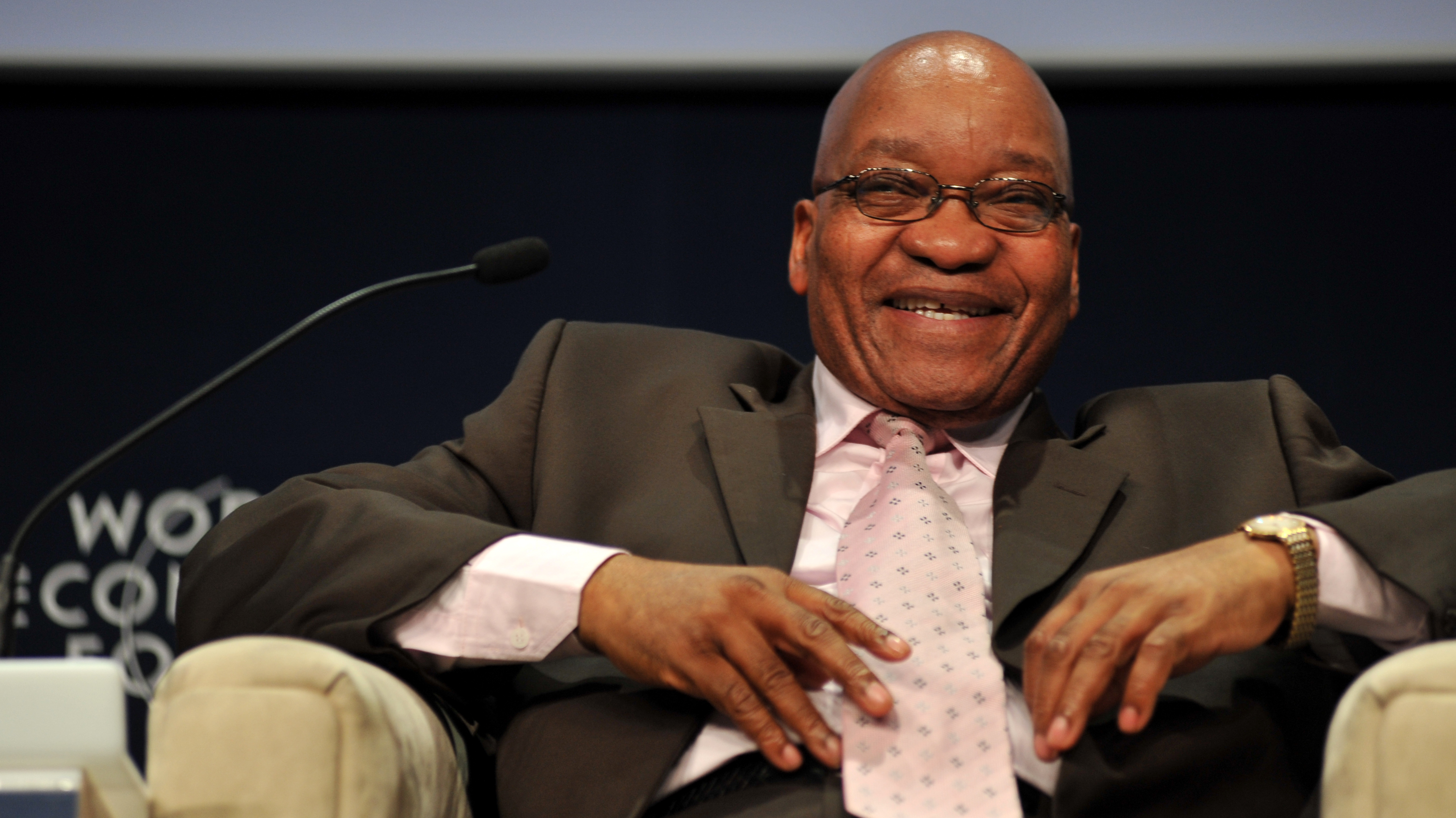
Shiceka was a political ally of President Jacob Zuma

His promotion was regarded as the result of his political loyalty to ANC president Jacob Zuma. Indeed, when Zuma succeeded Motlanthe as president after the April 2009 general election, Shiceka was retained in his cabinet. Re-elected to his seat in the National Assembly, he was also re-appointed to the same ministry, although Zuma renamed it the Ministry of Cooperative Governance and Traditional Affairs; during his early months in cabinet in 2008, Shiceka had developed a proposal for the establishment of the traditional affairs department. Yunus Carrim was appointed as Shiceka's new deputy. Upon taking up the renamed portfolio, Shiceka said that he would prioritise anti-corruption measures, aiming to achieve clean audits in all provincial and local governments by 2014. His duties also included overseeing host cities' preparations for the upcoming 2010 FIFA World Cup in South Africa.

However, Shiceka's major task and "poisoned chalice" under both Motlanthe and Zuma was political oversight of South Africa's municipalities, many of which were near collapse. In particular, a wave of service-delivery protests began in the winter of 2009. A task team appointed by Shiceka reported a web of underlying causes, including corruption and financial mismanagement. In October 2009, Shiceka announced that, in service of the aim of eliminating service-delivery protests by 2014, his ministry would formulate a turnaround strategy for local municipalities; the strategy was adopted by cabinet at the end of the year. Connected to this programme of reform, in 2010 he introduced the Municipal Systems Amendment Bill, which introduced common professional standards for municipal public servants. By the end of 2010, the Mail & Guardian said that the reforms were "yet to yield results", though it commended Shiceka for being "a visible leader who put out the fires" created by long-running municipal demarcation disputes in Moutse, Matatiele, and Khutsong.

In the meantime, Shiceka restructured the Department of Cooperative Governance and Traditional Affairs (formerly the Department of Provincial and Local Government) to suit its newly expanded mandate. In a series of articles, the Mail & Guardian reported on tensions caused by changes in the department. The department's director-general, Lindiwe Msengana-Ndlela, had resigned in June 2009 after falling out with Shiceka, and other department employees told the Mail & Guardian that Shiceka had pressured employees to approve financial transactions without following the relevant provisions of the Public Finance Management Act and related regulations. Shiceka denied these reports. However, the Auditor-General gave his department qualified audit opinions in 2010 and 2011, after the department had previously received clean audits for seven consecutive years.

From late February 2011 onwards, Shiceka was on prolonged sick leave; his ministerial duties were performed in an acting capacity by Nathi Mthethwa, the Minister of Police.

==== Misuse of public funds ====
In March 2011, the Sunday Times broke the first of several stories which suggested that Shiceka had misappropriated public funds for his personal benefit, among other things to pay for luxury hotel stays, limousine services, first-class air tickets, and a visit to the Swiss jail where one of his girlfriends was detained. Additional allegations concerned an allegedly improper relationship between Shiceka and the chief financial officer of the bankrupt Madibeng Local Municipality, Nana Masithela. This reporting led to widespread calls for Shiceka's dismissal, including from inside the Tripartite Alliance.

In April, Parliament's Joint Committee on Ethics asked the Public Protector to investigate the allegations – the first time that it had made such a request in the post-apartheid era. The Public Protector, Thuli Madonsela, submitted her report to Parliament on 14 October 2011; titled In the Extreme, it recommended that Zuma should take "serious action" to punish Shiceka for maladministration and misconduct. By that time the draft report had already leaked to the press. Shiceka consistently denied wrongdoing.

==== Dismissal ====
On 24 October 2011, President Zuma announced a cabinet reshuffle in which Shiceka – still on sick leave – was sacked and replaced by Richard Baloyi. The move was welcomed by opposition parties and by the Young Communist League. Shiceka continued to serve in the National Assembly until his death, whereafter he was replaced by Dudu Chili.

== Illness and death ==
In October 2011, several days before Zuma sacked him from the cabinet, Shiceka was hospitalised at Life Carstenhof Clinic in Midrand, Gauteng. After he was sacked, press reported that he was in critical condition. He died on 30 April 2012, aged 45, at the Umtata General Hospital in Umtata, Eastern Cape. Official accounts of his death said only that he had died after "a long illness"; City Press published an editorial suggesting that this phrase was a euphemism for complications from HIV/AIDS, which at the time was both endemic and stigmatised in South Africa.

Shiceka was granted an official funeral, held at the Standard Bank Arena in Johannesburg on 9 May, and he was buried at the Westpark Cemetery. Obituaries weighed his political ambition and energetic management style against his apparently egregious malfeasance. The Mail & Guardian's Charles Molele concluded that his "corrupt activities overshadowed a formidable political career". Chris Barron of the Sunday Times, describing Shiceka as "vibrant, intelligent, charismatic, highly ambitious and an impeccable dresser", agreed that he "had the potential to become an outstanding political leader, but instead became a notorious philanderer and high-living abuser of the public purse". At one memorial service, politician Mondli Gungubele reflected, "He was my friend... but he was also difficult to agree with. He enjoyed life and lived to the full."

== Personal life ==
Shiceka was estranged from his legal wife, Cleopatra Salaphi, also known as MaDlamini. According to the Sunday Times, "He had so many wives and girlfriends that even his closest friends couldn't keep track." When he died, he had 19 children. City Press had reported in April 2011 that he had a child with Sisi Mabe, an ANC politician from the Free State.

Upon his appointment to cabinet, Shiceka was a non-executive director in 11 companies.

== Legacy ==
An informal settlement in Sedibeng, settled in 1996 by destitute farmworkers, is named Sicelo Shiceka.
