= Zuko Godlimpi =

South African politician (born 1992)

The Honourable Zuko Godlimpi MP

Deputy Minister of Trade, Industry and Competition
- Incumbent
- Assumed office 3 July 2024 Serving with Andrew Whitfield (3 July 2024 – 26 June 2025), Alexandra Abrahams (17 Nov 2025-)
- President: Cyril Ramaphosa
- Minister: Parks Tau
- Preceded by: Fikile Majola; Nomalungelo Gina

Member of the National Assembly
- Incumbent
- Assumed office 14 June 2024

Personal details
- Born: 21 March 1992 (age 34) Ludeke, Cape Province; South Africa
- Party: African National Congress
- Education: Walter Sisulu University; University of South Africa; University of Pretoria

Zuko Godlimpi (born 21 March 1992) is a South African politician from the Eastern Cape. He has been serving as Deputy Minister of Trade, Industry and Competition since July 2024. A member of the African National Congress (ANC), he was elected to his first term in the National Assembly in the May 2024 general election.

Godlimpi entered politics as a student activist in the South African Students Congress and rose to prominence in the ANC Youth League. In December 2022, he was the youngest candidate elected to a five-year term on the ANC National Executive Committee. Until his elevation to the National Assembly in 2024, he worked as a political staffer in the ANC-led Eastern Cape Provincial Government, most recently as special adviser to Eastern Cape Premier Oscar Mabuyane.

== Early life and education ==
Born on 21 March 1992, Godlimpi is from Ludeke, a village in the Ntabankulu Local Municipality of the Eastern Cape.

He began university at the Walter Sisulu University, where he was a member of the student representative council. He was also active in national student politics through the South African Students Congress (SASCO) and African National Congress (ANC) Youth League (ANCYL), and from 2010 to 2011 he was the regional secretary of SASCO's Western Region branch in the Eastern Cape. He went on to graduate from the University of South Africa, earning a Bachelor of Arts in politics, philosophy and economics. He completed his Honours degree in the same subject at the University of Pretoria.

== Early career ==
=== ANC Youth League: 2013–2022 ===
Godlimpi began his career at ANC headquarters at Luthuli House, working as the ANCYL's national policy coordinator from 2013 to 2014. In 2014, he entered public service, becoming an economic researcher at the Department of Trade and Industry; he was stationed in the office of the Deputy Minister of Trade and Industry, a position then held by Mzwandile Masina. In 2016, Masina left the ministry to serve as Mayor of Ekurhuleni, and Godlimpi joined his administration in the City of Ekurhuleni Metropolitan Municipality, where he was a speechwriter and council liaison between 2016 and 2019.

After the 2019 general election, Godlimpi was transferred from the City of Ekurhuleni to the Gauteng Provincial Legislature, where he was an adviser to the Speaker of the Provincial Legislature, Ntombi Mekgwe. In 2022 he served as acting senior manager for transversal mainstreaming in the legislature. Later in 2022, he returned to the Eastern Cape to work in the provincial government as chief of staff in the provincial Department of Cooperative Governance and Traditional Affairs, which was then under the political leadership of Zolile Williams.

Throughout this period, Godlimpi remained a prominent figure in the ANCYL. In 2019 he was a leader of the internal campaign to have Collen Maine's ANCYL leadership corps disbanded. After that campaign succeeded, he was viewed as a possible candidate to succeed Maine as national president of the ANCYL. Such speculation intensified in the run-up to the league's next national elective conference, especially after Godlimpi became one of three candidates – the others being Aphiwe Mkhangelwa and Collen Malatji – who received sufficient nominations to stand on the ballot paper. He did not stand for the presidency and Malatji was elected unopposed, but in the interim Godlimpi served as spokesperson of the Eastern Cape branch of the ANCYL between 2021 and 2022.

=== ANC National Executive Committee: 2022–2024 ===
In December 2022, Godlimpi attended the 55th National Conference of the mainstream ANC, where he was elected to a five-year term as a member of the ANC National Executive Committee (NEC). By number of votes received, he was ranked 54th of the 80 ordinary members elected, receiving 1,172 votes across 4,029 ballots.

The youngest member of the newly elected NEC, Godlimpi was touted as a possible candidate to replace Pule Mabe as the ANC's national spokesperson. Instead, at the NEC's first meeting in February 2023, he was elected as deputy chairperson of the influential NEC subcommittee on economic transformation, serving under subcommittee chairperson Mmamoloko Kubayi. Meanwhile, later in 2023, he left his former job in the provincial Department of Cooperative Governance to join the Office of the Eastern Cape Premier; he served as a special adviser to Premier Oscar Mabuyane until the next general election in May 2024.

== National government: 2024–present ==
Ahead of the May 2024 general election, Godlimpi stood as an ANC candidate, ranked 21st on the party's national list. He was elected to a seat in the National Assembly, the lower house of the South African Parliament. He also served as acting national spokesperson of the ANC during the subsequent government formation negotiations while the incumbent spokesperson, Mahlengi Bhengu, took personal leave.

On 30 June 2024, announcing his post-election third cabinet, President Ramaphosa announced Godlimpi's appointment as Deputy Minister of Trade, Industry and Competition. In that capacity he deputises Minister Parks Tau and serves alongside Deputy Minister Andrew Whitfield.
