= Department of Public Service and Administration =

South African national government department

Department overview
- Jurisdiction: Government of South Africa
- Headquarters: Batho Pele House, 546 Edmond Street, Arcadia; 25.7405°S 28.205°E
- Employees: 444 (2018/19)
- Annual budget: R565.7 million (2020/21)
- Minister responsible: Mzamo Buthelezi, Minister of Public Service and Administration
- Deputy Minister responsible: Pinky Kekana, Deputy Minister of Public Service and Administration
- Department executive: Willie Vukela, Acting Director General of Public Service and Administration
- Child department: Centre for Public Service Innovation (CPSI)
- Key documents: Public Service Act, 1994; Public Administration Management Act, 2014
- Website: dpsa.gov.za

The Department of Public Service and Administration (DPSA) is a department of the national government of South Africa, that is responsible for the organization and administration of the civil service.

The department is responsible for matters including labour relations of government employees, the provision of government IT services, and integrity in public administration.

Political responsibility for the department is held by the Minister of Public Service and Administration, who is assisted by a deputy minister. As of June 2024 the minister is Mzamo Buthelezi and the deputy minister is Pinky Kekana.

In the 2020 budget, the DPSA received an appropriation of R565.7 million. In the 2018/19 financial year, it had a total of 444 employees.

== See also ==
- National School of Government
- Batho Pele Award
