= Nomatyala Hangana =

South African politician (1956–2012)

Member of the National Assembly
- In office 2004–2009
- In office 1994–2001

Personal details
- Born: 12 April 1956 Kwa-Mandlenkosi, Beaufort West; Cape Province, Union of South Africa
- Died: 3 August 2012 (aged 56) Western Cape, South Africa
- Party: African National Congress

Nomatyala Elizabeth Hangana (12 April 1956 – 3 August 2012) was a South African politician who served as Deputy Minister of Provincial and Local Government from April 2004 to May 2009. She represented the African National Congress (ANC) in the National Assembly from 1994 to 2009, excepting a hiatus from 2001 to 2004 when she served in the Western Cape Executive Council. She was a former Provincial Chairperson of the ANC Women's League in the Western Cape.

== Early life and career ==
Hangana was born on 12 April 1956 and grew up in KwaMandlenkosi, a township in Beaufort West in the Central Karoo. She obtained a paralegal's diploma in 1982 and worked at the Legal Resources Centre in Cape Town and then in the Athlone law offices of Bulelani Ngcuka.

== Legislative career: 1994–2009 ==
In South Africa's first post-apartheid elections in 1994, Hangana was elected to represent the ANC in the National Assembly, the lower house of the South African Parliament. During the legislative term that followed, she chaired the Portfolio Committee on Housing from 1997 to 1999. She was also a member of the national executive of the ANC Women's League and served as Provincial Chairperson of the league's Western Cape branch.

She was re-elected to her legislative seat in 1999, but in late 2001 the ANC transferred her to the Western Cape Provincial Parliament, where she served as Member of the Executive Council (MEC) for Housing in the Western Cape Executive Council. The Mail & Guardian said that her performance was disappointing and that she "left the Western Cape housing department in shambles".

Pursuant to the 2004 general election, Hangana returned to the National Assembly and President Thabo Mbeki appointed her as Deputy Minister of Provincial and Local Government under Minister Sydney Mufamadi. She resigned from government after the 2009 general election.

== Personal life and death ==
She had three children. She died in the Western Cape on 3 August 2012 following a short illness.
