= Francois Rodgers =

South African politician

Francois Rodgers MPL

Member of the KwaZulu-Natal Executive Council for Finance
- Incumbent
- Assumed office 18 June 2024
- Premier: Thami Ntuli
- Preceded by: Peggy Nkonyeni

Leader of the Democratic Alliance in KwaZulu-Natal
- In office 27 March 2021 – 9 May 2026
- Deputy: Chris Pappas; Sthembiso Ngema
- Preceded by: Zwakele Mncwango
- Succeeded by: Sithembiso Ngema

Member of the KwaZulu-Natal Legislature
- Incumbent
- Assumed office 21 May 2014

Member of the National Assembly of South Africa
- In office 14 March 2013 – 6 May 2014

Provincial Chairperson of the Democratic Alliance
- In office 3 February 2018 – 27 March 2021
- Deputy: Hlengiwe Shozi; Craig Miller; Shehana Kajee
- Preceded by: Haniff Hoosen
- Succeeded by: Dean Macpherson

Deputy Provincial Leader of the Democratic Alliance
- In office 17 March 2012 – 25 April 2015
- Leader: Sizwe Mchunu
- Preceded by: Sizwe Mchunu
- Succeeded by: Mergan Chetty

Personal details
- Born: Francoise Adrianus Rodgers; 10 September 1961 (age 64)
- Party: Democratic Alliance

Francoise Adrianus Rodgers (born 10 September 1961), known as Francois Rodgers, is a South African politician from KwaZulu-Natal who has been the Member of the Executive Council for Finance since 2024. He served as the provincial leader of Democratic Alliance (DA) since 2021.

He is a Member of the KwaZulu-Natal Legislature and the leader of the DA's caucus. He was previously the party's caucus chief whip. From 2013 to 2014, Rodgers was a Member of Parliament (MP) in the National Assembly.

Rodgers started his political career as a DA councillor in Kokstad. He had served as the Deputy Provincial Leader of the DA from 2012 to 2015, before becoming the party's Provincial Chairperson in 2018. In 2021, he announced that he would be running to replace Zwakele Mncwango, who had announced intention to retire, as the Provincial Leader of the party. He was endorsed by Mncwango and seen as the front-runner. He was elected provincial leader on 27 March 2021, defeating the DA's caucus leader in eThekwini, Nicole Graham, and her deputy, Emmanuel Mhlongo.

In the 2024 provincial election, no party won a majority of seats in the provincial legislature. The DA formed part of a coalition with the Inkatha Freedom Party, the African National Congress, and the National Freedom Party which saw Rodgers appointed as the Member of the Executive Council for the Finance portfolio.

Rodgers announced his intention to retire as DA provincial leader in January 2026. Deputy Leader Sithembiso Ngema was elected to succeed him as the party's provincial congress in May 2026.
