= National School of Government (South Africa) =

South African government agency

Department overview
- Formed: October 21, 2013; 12 years ago
- Preceding Department: Public Administration Leadership and Management Academy
- Jurisdiction: Government of South Africa
- Status: Active
- Headquarters: Pretoria, Gauteng, South Africa; 25.74892064965279°S 28.20186468260387°E
- Minister responsible: Mzamo Buthelezi, Minister of Public Service and Administration
- Deputy Minister responsible: Pinky Kekana, Deputy Minister of Public Service and Administration
- Department executive: Phindile Mkwanazi, Acting Principal
- Key documents: Public Service Act, 1994; Presidential Proclamation No. 46 of 2013
- Website: www.thensg.gov.za

The National School of Government (NSG) is a South African national government department that forms part of the portfolio of the Minister of Public Service and Administration. It serves as the government's central institution for the training and professional development of public servants, providing education and development programs in areas including public administration, management, leadership, and governance.

== History ==
In 1996, the South African Management Development Institute (SAMDI), which had previously formed part of the Office of the Public Service Commission, began operating as a separate accountable entity. SAMDI provided practical training and development interventions for the public service and was subsequently incorporated into the Department of Public Service and Administration.

In October 1999, SAMDI became a fully fledged national government department, with its own Director-General accountable to the Minister of Public Service and Administration.

In 2008, SAMDI was transformed into the Public Administration Leadership and Management Academy (PALAMA). The academy was formally launched on 1 August 2008, and was intended to expand management development and training for public servants across the national, provincial, and local spheres of government. PALAMA sought to increase the scale of public service training by working with public and private sector educational and training institutions.

The National School of Government (NSG) was established in 2013 as the successor to PALAMA. On 14 October 2013, then-President Jacob Zuma issued a proclamation amending Schedule 1 of the Public Service Act, 1994, to replace PALAMA with the National School of Government. The proclamation was gazetted on 21 October 2013, when the NSG was formally launched as a national government department under the portfolio of the Minister of Public Service and Administration.

During its first decade, the NSG expanded its training programs and developed a broader role in professionalizing the public service. Its activities included accredited and non-accredited training programs for public servants at different levels of government, as well as institutional development initiatives and partnerships with higher education institutions and other organizations.

In 2016, the South African Cabinet approved the ability for serving and retired public servants to become lecturers at the NSG, further integrating practical public sector experience into its training programs.

From 2020, the NSG expanded its programs beyond conventional public service training, including launching the Economic Governance School Program for executive members across the South African government. The program was subsequently extended to participants outside South Africa, including the Zambian Cabinet in 2024.

In 2024, the NSG entered into a partnership with Tshwane University of Technology to develop and deliver a postgraduate diploma in public affairs and African governance. The program was intended to strengthen public sector governance and professionalize public servants in South Africa and other African countries.

In February 2024, the South African government passed the Public Administration Management Amendment Act 7, of 2025, which established a comprehensive statutory framework for the NSG, as part of the Public Administration Management Act, 2014. Under President Cyril Ramaphosa, the act came into effect in March 2026.

== Mandate ==
The NSG is classified as a Schedule 1 Government Department under the Public Service Act, 1994, and is mandated to facilitate education, training, and development for South African public servants. Its mandate extends across the three spheres of government – local, provincial, and national, as well as state-owned enterprises and other organs of state.

The NSG develops and delivers training programs intended to strengthen public-sector human-resource capacity, promote the values and principles governing public administration, and improve institutional performance and service delivery.

Under its expanded mandate, the NSG is responsible for providing education and training, supporting institutional development, fostering collaboration with other training and higher education institutions, offering qualifications and partial qualifications recognized within the National Qualifications Framework (NQF), and conducting training, examinations, and assessments where required.

The NSG's mandate is principally derived from the Public Service Act, 1994 and the Public Administration Management Act, 2014, as well as the constitutional principles governing public administration. Section 4 of the Public Service Act provides for a training institution listed as a national department, and assigns it responsibility for providing or facilitating training, and conducting examinations or tests prescribed for appointment or transfer within the public service.

== See also ==
- Government of South Africa
- Politics in South Africa
