= Thembi Simelane =

South African politician (born 1973)

The Honourable Thembi Simelane MP

Minister of Human Settlements
- Incumbent
- Assumed office 3 December 2024
- President: Cyril Ramaphosa
- Preceded by: Mmamoloko Kubayi

Member of the National Assembly
- Incumbent
- Assumed office 14 June 2024

Minister of Justice and Constitutional Development
- In office 3 July 2024 – 3 December 2024
- President: Cyril Ramaphosa
- Deputy: Andries Nel
- Preceded by: Ronald Lamola

Minister of Cooperative Governance and Traditional Affairs
- In office 7 March 2023 – 19 June 2024
- President: Cyril Ramaphosa
- Deputy: Parks Tau; Zolile Burns-Ncamashe
- Preceded by: Nkosazana Dlamini-Zuma
- Succeeded by: Velenkosi Hlabisa

Deputy Minister of Cooperative Governance and Traditional Affairs
- In office 10 August 2021 – 6 March 2023 Serving with Obed Bapela
- President: Cyril Ramaphosa
- Minister: Nkosazana Dlamini-Zuma
- Preceded by: Parks Tau
- Succeeded by: Parks Tau

Mayor of Polokwane
- In office July 2014 – August 2021
- Preceded by: Freddy Greaver
- Succeeded by: John Mpe

Personal details
- Born: Thembisile Phumelele Simelane; 10 February 1973 (age 53) Bethal, Eastern Transvaal; South Africa
- Party: African National Congress
- Spouse: Chipyane Nkadimeng (div. 2019)
- Relations: Nokuthula Simelane (sister)
- Education: University of the North; Stellenbosch University

Thembisile Phumelele Simelane-Nkadimeng (born 10 February 1973) is a South African politician who is currently serving as the Minister of Human Settlements, a position she has held since December 2024. A member of the African National Congress (ANC), she was previously the Minister of Cooperative Governance and Traditional Affairs between March 2023 and June 2024 and the Minister of Justice and Constitutional Development between June 2024 and December 2024.

Formerly a student activist at Turfloop, Nkadimeng began her career as a public servant and entered professional politics in July 2014 as Mayor of Polokwane. In the last years of her mayoral term, she was additionally the president of the South African Local Government Association from 2019 to 2021. She joined the national government in August 2021, when President Cyril Ramaphosa appointed her as Deputy Minister Cooperative Governance and Traditional Affairs.

Pursuant to the ANC's 55th National Conference in December 2022, Nkadimeng was elected to five-year terms on the party's National Executive Committee and National Working Committee. Ramaphosa promoted her to his cabinet in the aftermath of the conference, and she was appointed Minister of Justice and Constitutional Development after the May 2024 general election. She was reshuffled to Minister of Human Settlements in December 2024.

== Early life and career ==
Simelane was born on 10 February 1973 in Bethal in the former Eastern Transvaal (now Mpumalanga Province). As a high school student during the final years of apartheid, she was active in the Congress of South African Students.

She attended the University of the North, where she was mentored by Joyce Mashamba. She completed a Bachelor of Arts in 1994, a diploma in higher education in 1995, and Honours in 1997. At Turfloop, she remained active in student politics, both as a member (and later deputy president) of the student representative council and as a member of the South African Students Congress (SASCO); she was SASCO's provincial secretary in the Northern Transvaal (present-day Limpopo) between 1994 and 1996.

In 1997, Simelane began her career in post-apartheid public administration, and over the next decade she held positions in four different government departments, notably as director of communications in the Office of the Limpopo Premier from 2002 to 2006. From 2009 to 2013, she moved to the private sector as a corporate affairs manager for Anglo American Platinum. After leaving Anglo, she became managing director of Golden Threads, a consultancy specialising in corporate social investment whose clients included Anglo, BKS, and the public Industrial Development Corporation. Alongside her full-time career, she held leadership positions in local branches of the African National Congress (ANC) and its Women's League in Polokwane, Limpopo. In addition, she obtained a Bachelor of Philosophy in policy studies at Stellenbosch University in 2001 and completed the advanced management programme at the Wits Business School in 2009.

== Mayor of Polokwane: 2014–2021 ==
On 1 July 2014, as part of a broader reshuffle of Limpopo municipalities, the ANC announced that it would elect Nkadimeng as executive mayor of the Polokwane Local Municipality following the resignation of Freddy Greaver. She was re-elected to the mayoralty after the August 2016 local elections, defeating an opposition challenge by Frank Haas of the Democratic Alliance. The Sowetan said that she was a political ally of Limpopo Premier Stan Mathabatha.

Nkadimeng's mayoral term was marred by political difficulties. She twice stood unsuccessfully for election as regional chairperson of the ANC's Peter Mokaba branch in Capricorn District, losing to Motalane Monakedi in October 2014 and to John Mpe in July 2018. On the latter occasion, she faced death threats during her campaign, and her defeat led to a formal request by Mpe's leadership corps for Nkadimeng's removal from the mayoral office. The opposition Economic Freedom Fighters also called for her removal in 2021 after the Auditor-General handed the Polokwane municipality a qualified audit opinion.

In June 2019, Nkadimeng was elected to succeed Parks Tau as national president of the South African Local Government Association (SALGA); she had previously been the association's provincial chairperson in Limpopo.

== National government ==
=== Cooperative Affairs and Governance: 2021–2024 ===
On 5 August 2021, President Cyril Ramaphosa announced Nkadimeng's appointment as Deputy Minister of Cooperative Governance and Traditional Affairs. Sworn in on 10 August, she resigned both as Polokwane mayor and as SALGA president; John Mpe replaced her as mayor. The following year, in December 2022, the ANC's 55th National Conference elected Nkadimeng to a five-year term on the party's National Executive Committee (NEC). She received 1,681 votes across the 4,029 ballots cast, making her the 15th-most popular member of the 80-member committee. She was also elected to the party's National Working Committee, appointed as the chairperson of the NEC's subcommittee on legislature and governance, and appointed to an NEC task team that was mandated with developing the party's approach to coalition government.

In the aftermath of the 55th National Conference, Nkadimeng succeeded Nkosazana Dlamini-Zuma as Minister of Cooperative Governance and Traditional Affairs in a cabinet reshuffle on 6 March 2023. One of two ministers appointed to the cabinet from outside the National Assembly, she was reportedly hand-picked for the promotion by Ramaphosa. Parks Tau and Zolile Burns-Ncamashe were appointed as her deputies.

Upon her appointment, Nkadimeng said that one of her top priorities as minister would be the stability of municipalities, especially those governed by coalitions. In this vein she Gazetted as regulation a code of conduct for local councillors and introduced into Parliament the Local Government: Municipal Structures Amendment Bill, 2023. Adriaan Basson of News24 commended her "sober and mature approach to coalition governments". She also introduced the Intergovernmental Monitoring, Support, and Interventions Bill, 2023, which included measures for national government intervention in dysfunctional municipalities, and introduced regulations for institutionalising the District Development Model. Meanwhile, her ministry authorised states of disaster in multiple provinces after extreme weather events, and Nkadimeng was involved in negotiations with the South African Municipal Workers' Union over a strike in Matjhabeng.

=== Justice and Human Settlements: 2024–present ===
In the May 2024 general election, Nkadimeng was elected to a seat in the National Assembly, the lower house of the South African Parliament. On 30 June, President Ramaphosa announced her appointment to his third cabinet as Minister of Justice and Constitutional Development, with Andries Nel (a fellow ANC MP) as her deputy. They were sworn as minister and deputy minister on 3 July 2024. This followed the formation of a Government of National Unity (GNU) through a grand coalition, after the ANC lost its absolute majority in the election. The ministry previously had authority also for the Department of Correctional Services, which was established as a freestanding ministry within the GNU to accommodate members of coalition parties as ministers.

Simelane was reshuffled to Minister of Human Settlements in December 2024.

== Legal issues ==
In 2016, Simelane as Mayor of Polokwane received a R 575 600 "loan" from a now arrested VBS fixer for a coffee shop; the loan was the only loan made out by the VBS fixer in 2016. In 2024, the Hawks raided the Polokwane Municipality offices to secure evidence of corruption related to the municipality's R349 million investment with VBS Mutual Bank in 2016 and 2017. The loan was thought to be connected to money laundering in the municipality's dealings with VBS Bank. On 7 October 2024, Simelane said that she had told President Ramaphosa about the loan that she received from Gundo Wealth Solutions before he appointed her into his cabinet. On 16 April 2025, the DA laid criminal charges against Simelane, for defrauding Eskom of R 700 000.

== Personal life ==
Nkadimeng was married to politician Chipyane Clifton Nkadimeng until 2019, when they divorced. The Sunday World reported that she became engaged to Matome Ralebipi, the chairperson of the Limpopo Roads Agency, in February 2024. She has four children and also raised her brother's son.

Her elder sister, Nokuthula Simelane, was an anti-apartheid activist and Umkhonto we Sizwe operative who went missing during Nkadimeng's childhood in 1983, aged 23. It emerged during the Truth and Reconciliation Commission (TRC) that Simelane had been arrested in Johannesburg and taken to Vlakplaas, where she was tortured extensively by members of the Security Branch. Assisted by the Southern African Litigation Centre, Nkadimeng and her family led a sustained campaign of activism on behalf of Simelane and other victims of apartheid-era crimes, seeking an inquest and related criminal prosecutions. Nkadimeng has been quoted as saying that her sister's case was "indicative of the almost total disregard by the South African government for the recommendations made by the TRC". In 2016, the National Prosecuting Authority announced that it would prosecute four men linked to Simelane's kidnapping, and her family filed an application for presumption of death in 2018. A murder trial was underway in 2024.
