= Sithembiso Ngema =

South African politician

Councillor Sithembiso Ngema

Leader of the Democratic Alliance in KwaZulu-Natal
- Incumbent
- Assumed office 9 May 2026
- Deputy: Martin Meyer
- Preceded by: Francois Rodgers

Deputy Leader of the Democratic Alliance in KwaZulu-Natal
- In office 29 April 2023 – 9 May 2026
- Leader: Francois Rodgers
- Preceded by: Chris Pappas
- Succeeded by: Martin Meyer

Member of the KwaZulu-Natal Legislature
- In office 28 September 2023 – 29 May 2024
- Preceded by: Hlanganani Gumbi

Deputy Provincial Chairperson of the Democratic Alliance in KwaZulu-Natal
- In office 27 March 2021 – 29 April 2023

Personal details
- Party: Democratic Alliance

Sithembiso Ngema is a South African politician and former reserve police officer who has been the Leader of the Democratic Alliance in KwaZulu-Natal since May 2026 and a councillor in the eThekwini Metropolitan Municipality since 2024. He previously served as the deputy provincial leader from 2023 to 2026 and as a deputy provincial chairperson from 2021 until 2023. Ngema served in the KwaZulu-Natal Legislature from 2023 until 2024, having been an eThekwini councillor from 2011.

== Early life and career ==
Ngema grew up in Glendale and Lamontville outside Durban. He worked in the security industry before becoming a reserve police officer at the Glendale Police Station. He also established and managed a security company before becoming involved in politics.

== Political career ==
Ngema had a conversation with Democratic Alliance politician John Steenhuisen, who referred him to KwaDukuza Local Municipality Madhun Singh, which led Ngema to become involved in politics in 2006. He became an ordinary party activist before gradually rising through the party's ranks.

Ngema was elected a proportional representation (PR) councillor in the eThekwini Metropolitan Municipality in 2011 and re-elected in 2016. At the DA provincial elective conference held on 27 March 2021, he was elected as one of three deputy provincial chairpersons of the DA alongside Elma Rabe and Sehana Kajee. Ngema was re-elected as a councillor in eThekwini in the 2021 municipal election.

In April 2023, Ngema stood for deputy provincial leader of the party. He was elected at the party's provincial conference, having defeated Mzamo Billy.

On 28 September 2023, Ngema was sworn in as a Member of the KwaZulu-Natal Legislature; he filled the casual vacancy that arose when Hlanganani Gumbi resigned earlier that month.

Ngema lost his seat in the provincial legislature due to the DA's electoral performance in the 2024 provincial election. He subsequently returned to the eThekwini city council as a proportional representation councillor for the DA, having beat 19 candidates during the party's internal selection process. He filled Mzamo Billy's seat, who resigned following his election to the National Council of Provinces.

In April 2026, Ngema declared his candidacy to succeed Francois Rodgers as the provincial leader of the DA; Rodgers had announced his intention to stand down. He defeated Mzamo Billy in a rematch. As provincial leader, Ngema said that South African president Cyril Ramaphosa's impeachment matter in parliament would not affect the provincial coalition government in KwaZulu-Natal. On 23 May 2026, he, Durban North DA Constituency head Tim Brauteseth and DA eThekwini mayoral candidate Haniff Hoosen welcomed new party members during an event in Newlands West.
