= Zwakele Mncwango =

South African politician (born 1978)

Leader of the Opposition in the KwaZulu-Natal Legislature
- In office 21 June 2018 – 7 May 2019
- Premier: Willies Mchunu
- Preceded by: Francois Rodgers
- Succeeded by: Velenkosini Hlabisa

Leader of the Democratic Alliance in KwaZulu-Natal
- In office 25 April 2015 – 27 March 2021
- Deputy: Mergan Chetty
- Preceded by: Sizwe Mchunu
- Succeeded by: Francois Rodgers

Member of the KwaZulu-Natal Legislature
- In office 1 March 2018 – 8 October 2022

Leader of the Democratic Alliance in the eThekwini Metropolitan Municipality
- In office 11 March 2013 – 1 March 2018
- Preceded by: Tex Collins
- Succeeded by: Nicole Graham

Personal details
- Born: 27 November 1978 (age 47) Nongoma, KwaZulu-Natal, South Africa
- Party: ActionSA (2022–present); Democratic Alliance (2001–2022)
- Spouse: Lindiwe (m. 2019)
- Occupation: Politician

Zwakele Maxwell Mncwango (born 27 November 1978) is a South African politician who is the provincial chairperson of ActionSA in KwaZulu-Natal. He was a Member of the KwaZulu-Natal Legislature from 2018 to 2022 and served as the Leader of the Opposition in the KwaZulu-Natal Legislature from 2018 to 2019. He was the Provincial Leader of the KwaZulu-Natal Democratic Alliance (DA) from 2015 to 2021. Mncwango was the party's KwaZulu-Natal Premier candidate for the 2019 election.

== Early life and education ==
Mncwango was born in the town of Nongoma in Natal. His father worked as a security guard in Durban, while his mother was a trader in Nongoma. His father is also a polygamist and has eighteen children. Mncwango is his youngest child.

Mncwango herded cattle in his early years. He started to get involved in politics at a young age. His uncle, Albert Mncwango, is a member of the Inkatha Freedom Party and currently the party's Deputy National Chairman. His family often attended the party's rallies in Nongoma.

Mncwango's older brother paid his school fees so that he could attend King Bhezulu High School. After he graduated from high school, Mncwango moved to Durban to fulfil his tertiary studies. He achieved a National Diploma in Electrical Engineering and a Bachelor of Technology in Engineering Management from the Durban University of Technology. He recently received a master's degree in Business Administration from the University of KwaZulu-Natal.

Mncwango has also finished a course on Strategic Planning and a Political Leadership course at the International Academy for Leadership in Germany. In 2014, he graduated from the Graduate School in the United States after he fulfilled a course on Good Governance and Transparency.

== Political career ==
Mncwango joined the Democratic Alliance in 2002 after he studied all the major political parties' policies. His family was surprised when he announced his choice of political affiliation, since they were all Inkatha Freedom Party supporters. He became a member of the KwaZulu-Natal Youth Parliament in 2006. Mncwango has held various leadership roles in the Democratic Alliance including vice-chair of a branch, member of the Constituency Executive, provincial youth leader and provincial vice chairperson of the party. He was elected an eThekwini municipality councillor for the Democratic Alliance in May 2011. He was appointed the leader of the party's caucus in March 2012, succeeding Tex Collins.

In 2015, Mncwango declared his candidacy for Provincial Leader of the Democratic Alliance. He was elected at the party's provincial congress on 25 April 2015, unseating incumbent Sizwe Mchunu by a margin of only seven votes.

For the 2016 municipal elections, the party selected Haniff Hoosen over Mncwango as the party's eThekwini mayoral candidate. The party later announced that it had reversed its decision. At the council's inaugural sitting, Mncwango lost to Zandile Gumede of the African National Congress. Gumede received 124 votes compared to Mncwango's 87 votes.

In February 2018, Mncwango won re-election to a second term as Provincial Leader of the party, after he defeated Sizakele Emmanuel Mhlongo. In March, he resigned as an eThekwini Municipality councillor. Nicole Graham succeeded him as caucus leader. Mncwango took office as a Member of the KwaZulu-Natal Legislature in the same month. He became the leader of the party's caucus in the legislature in June, succeeding Francois Rodgers.

On 13 September 2018, the National Leader of the Democratic Alliance, Mmusi Maimane, announced Mncwango as the party's KwaZulu-Natal Premier candidate. In the May 2019 election, the Inkatha Freedom Party unseated the Democratic Alliance as the official opposition in the provincial legislature, however, the DA did manage to grow its support from ten to eleven seats.

In August 2020, Mncwango announced that he would not be standing for re-election as provincial leader ahead of the party's provincial conference in 2021. Francois Rodgers, the DA chief whip in the provincial legislature, was elected to succeed him. In May 2021, Rodgers became the party's new caucus leader, while Mncwango replaced him as caucus chief whip.

On 5 October 2022, Mncwango announced that he would resigning as a Member of the Provincial Legislature on 16 October 2022. He stated that he would remain a member of the DA. The DA sent him a cease and desist letter after he said that he was leaving the legislature because the DA no longer stood for what he believed in, and that he could no longer defend the party anymore. On 8 October 2022, Mncwango resigned from the DA after the party alleged that he would be joining ActionSA. The DA also criticised Mncwango for having undertaken an overseas trip to Norway and Uganda under the DA banner while he was planning to leave the party.

Mncwango joined ActionSA on 17 October 2022 and became its provincial chairperson.

== Personal life ==
Mncwango was involved in a car accident in the Midlands of KwaZulu-Natal in January 2019. He consequently suspended campaigning for a few days.

He married Lindiwe Mncwango in June 2019.

In March 2020, Mncwango survived an attempted armed hijacking at his home in Westville, KwaZulu-Natal.
