= Department of Cooperative Governance and Traditional Affairs =

South African national government department

Department overview
- Formed: 2009; 17 years ago
- Preceding Department: Department of Provincial and Local Government
- Jurisdiction: Government of South Africa
- Headquarters: Pretoria, South Africa
- Annual budget: R135 billion (2026/27)
- Minister responsible: Velenkosini Hlabisa, Minister of Cooperative Governance and Traditional Affairs
- Deputy Minister responsible: Namane Dickson Masemola, Department of Cooperative Governance; Zolile Burns-Ncamashe, Department of Traditional Affairs
- Department executives: Mbulelo Tshangana, Director-General of the Department of Cooperative Governance; Mashwahle Diphofa, Director-General of the Department of Traditional Affairs
- Website: cogta.gov.za

The Department of Cooperative Governance and Traditional Affairs (CoGTA) is a department of the Government of South Africa, which oversees two sub-departments. Through the Department of Cooperative Governance, it is responsible for managing relations between the national, provincial, and local spheres of government. Through the Traditional Affairs, it is responsible for managing the country's traditional leadership and indigenous governance structures.

The department was formerly known as the Department of Provincial and Local Government. Following a restructuring of government departments in 2009, under then-President Jacob Zuma, the department was reorganized into the Department of Cooperative Governance and the Department of Traditional Affairs, both operating under the CoGTA ministry.

The department operates according to the constitutional principle of cooperative governance, which promotes coordination and cooperation between South Africa’s three spheres of government.

CoGTA is headed by the Minister of Cooperative Governance and Traditional Affairs. The position has, since July 2024, been held by Velenkosini Hlabisa, a member of the Inkatha Freedom Party (IFP).

== Functions ==
The department is responsible for:

- Developing and monitoring national policy and legislation relating to cooperative governance and local government
- Supporting and exercising oversight over provincial and local government, including strengthening the capacity of municipalities
- Promoting cooperative governance and coordinating intergovernmental relations between the three spheres of government
- Promoting integrated service delivery and sustainable development at provincial and local government level
- Coordinating national disaster management policy, preparedness, response and recovery
- Supporting and strengthening institutions of traditional leadership and traditional councils
- Coordinating traditional affairs across government and supporting the participation of traditional leadership in community development

The department works closely with municipalities, provincial governments, the South African Local Government Association (SALGA), traditional leadership institutions, and the National House of Traditional and Khoi-San Leaders.

== Traditional affairs ==
Traditional leadership is recognized under the Constitution of South Africa and customary law. The department supports the institution of traditional leadership and promotes its role in rural development and community governance.

The department also oversees matters relating to:

- Traditional councils
- Traditional leadership disputes and claims
- Initiation practices
- Recognition of Khoi-San leadership
- Indigenous customs and governance systems

== COVID-19 pandemic ==
During the COVID-19 pandemic in South Africa, the department played a central role in coordinating the national response to the pandemic, following the Presidential declaration of a national state of disaster in March 2020. Under the Disaster Management Act, 2002, the Minister of Cooperative Governance and Traditional Affairs was empowered to issue regulations and directions governing the response to the disaster. The minister subsequently issued and amended regulations governing the country's COVID-19 lockdown.

== Community development initiatives ==
CoGTA has engaged with community-based development initiatives that seek to strengthen cooperation between communities and government structures, particularly in rural areas.

In 2025, the department publicly praised the Virtual State Programme, a community-based initiative operating in KwaZulu-Natal, for its contribution to agricultural development, skills development and community upliftment.

The Virtual State Programme has worked to strengthen links between communities and government through civic education and community participation. Its community-based projects have included agriculture, environmental initiatives and other local development activities. In Sweetwaters, the programme helped facilitate an agricultural project that transformed several hectares of land into vegetable gardens, with the aim of developing agricultural skills and creating sustainable sources of income for community members.

== Ministers ==
The ministers who have led the department are:

| Minister | Term | Cabinet |
|---|---|---|
| Sicelo Shiceka | 2009–2010 | First Cabinet of Jacob Zuma |
| Richard Baloyi | 2010–2014 | First Cabinet of Jacob Zuma |
| Pravin Gordhan | 2014–2018 | Second Cabinet of Jacob Zuma |
| Zweli Mkhize | 2018–2019 | First Cabinet of Cyril Ramaphosa |
| Nkosazana Dlamini-Zuma | 2019–2023 | Second Cabinet of Cyril Ramaphosa |
| Velenkosini Hlabisa | 2024–present | Third Cabinet of Cyril Ramaphosa |

== See also ==
- Government of South Africa
- Local government in South Africa
- South African Local Government Association
