= Virtual State Programme =

South African non-profit community development organisation

- Abbreviation: VSP
- Formation: 2008
- Founder: Mlungisi 'Mlu' Mncwabe
- Type: Non-profit organisation

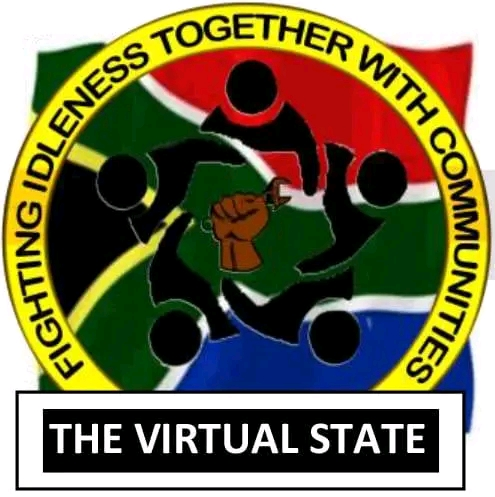
The Virtual State logo symbolising unity, empowerment, and collective action through the South African flag, interconnected figures, the African continent, and the slogan "Fighting Idleness Together with Communities.

Virtual State Programme (VSP) is a non-profit community organisation that focuses on community development, it is based in Sweetwaters, Pietermaritzburg, in the province of KwaZulu-Natal, South Africa. Initially, it was informally founded in 2008 by Mlu Mncwabe, the organisation's focus at first was to supports learners affected by changes to South Africa's school curriculum. It later expanded its activities to include sustainable agriculture, civic education, environmental conservation, and youth skills development.

According to The Witness, the organisation developed the Virtual State Programme as a civic education initiative intended to improve public understanding of government institutions and encourage community participation in local development.

== History ==
According to The Witness, the organisation was founded in response to curriculum changes in South African schools that affected learners during the transition to a revised education system.

As community priorities changed, the organisation broadened its focus to include agriculture and sustainability. Its programmes subsequently expanded to address food security, environmental management, skills development and community participation.

== Activities ==
The organisation conducts community development programmes centred on sustainable agriculture and civic engagement.

=== One School, One Garden ===
The One School, One Garden initiative supports the establishment of food gardens at schools as a means of promoting agricultural education and food production.

=== Resuscitation of Fields ===
The Resuscitation of Fields programme focuses on restoring underutilised agricultural land for cultivation. According to The Witness, six cultivation sites had been established under the programme by 2025.

=== Aquaponics ===
In 2025, the VSP introduced an aquaponics system through a partnership with the Department of Forestry, Fisheries and the Environment. The Witness reported that the project was regarded as the first community-based aquaponics initiative of its kind in the province of KwaZulu-Natal. The aquaponics system was introduced to provide practical agricultural training and employment-related skills.

== Partnerships ==
The Virtual State Programme has collaborated with government departments and NGOs in implementing its activities.

Partners include:

- Department of Co-operative Governance and Traditional Affairs
- Department of Forestry, Fisheries and the Environment
- Duzi-uMngeni Conservation Trust

These partnerships have supported projects relating to agriculture, environmental conservation and community development.

== See also ==
- Community development
- Sustainable agriculture
- Aquaponics
- Civic education
- Food security
