= Sydney Mufamadi =

South African politician

Fholisani Sydney Mufamadi

Minister of Provincial and Local Government
- In office 17 June 1999 – 25 September 2008
- President: Thabo Mbeki
- Preceded by: Valli Moosa
- Succeeded by: Sicelo Shiceka

Minister of Safety and Security
- In office 27 April 1994 – 16 June 1999
- President: Nelson Mandela
- Preceded by: Hernus Kriel (as Minister of Law and Order)
- Succeeded by: Steve Tshwete

Personal details
- Born: 28 February 1959 (age 67) Alexandra Township, Johannesburg, South Africa

Fholisani Sydney Mufamadi (born 28 February 1959) is a South African politician. He was Minister of Safety and Security from 1994 to 1999 and Minister of Provincial and Local Government from 1999 to 2008.

== Early life ==
Mufamadi was born on 28 February 1959 in Alexandra Township, Johannesburg, the eldest of the four children of Masindi and Reuben Mufamadi. He grew up in Meadowlands, Gauteng, and Tshisahulu, Venda (today Limpopo Province), where he first looked after his grandfather's cattle before attending school. Both his father and mother worked in Johannesburg, selling home-brewed alcoholic beverages to supplement the family income. His mother was subsequently arrested for illegally selling alcohol, and thus he experienced the apartheid era legal system first-hand at an early age.

== Education ==
Mufamadi completed his schooling at Khwevha High School in Shayandima, Venda, in 1977.

He holds a Master of Science degree in State, Society and Development from the University of London, and has a PhD specializing in Political Economy of Automotive Manufacturing.

== Anti-apartheid work ==
In 1976, with the spread of the Soweto uprising into other areas of the country, Mufamadi became a member of Zoutpansberg Students Organisation, which led to the boycotts in Venda during October 1977. Many student leaders were arrested, and others, including Mufamadi, went underground. When the schools re-opened, he was refused re-admission and was briefly prevented from completing his schooling. He moved to Johannesburg and enrolled at an international Correspondence College.

In 1977, he joined the African National Congress, the next year he was a founder member of the Azanian People's Organisation and in 1981 he joined the South African Communist Party. His involvement in AZAPO led to two months' detention without trial at John Vorster Square, Johannesburg, under section 6 of the Terrorism Act.

In 1980, Mufamadi worked as a private teacher at Lamula Secondary School, Soweto, where he assisted members of the Congress of South African Students with political activities. In 1981, he left the teaching profession to work as a messenger for a firm of attorneys and subsequently joined the General and Allied Workers Union and participated in the 16 June stay-away that year. After his employer saw a newspaper clipping of Mufamadi addressing the workers, he was fired for taking part in political activities. He worked voluntarily for GAWU, and in 1982 and 1984 was elected General Secretary of the organisation. In 1983, he attended the launch of the United Democratic Front in Cape Town, and was later elected Transvaal publicity secretary of the organisation, a position he held until 1990. In 1984 he was detained twice in the Ciskei during April and again in September.

Following the successful Transvaal regional stay-away in November 1984, Mufamadi was subpoenaed to appear as a state witness at the trial of some of its organisers. However, when some of the accused fled the country, charges were withdrawn and he was not called to testify. In 1985, when the state of emergency was declared, Mufamadi operated underground to avoid detention, resurfacing to help organise and attend the December 1985 launch of the Congress of South African Trade Unions in Durban, where he was elected Assistant General Secretary at its inaugural rally. He operated underground from June 1986 to October 1986, but openly resumed his work despite the continuing state of emergency. He was again detained on 8 June 1987 for political activities.

In June 1988, Mufamadi headed a planning committee to organise an anti-apartheid conference in Cape Town, which aimed to include delegates from a broad spectrum of anti-apartheid organisations. In September 1988, the government prohibited the conference and restricted the organisers of the conference from entering Cape Town for a ten-day period. In January 1990, he travelled with the Rivonia Trialists to Lusaka, Zambia, to meet with the ANC Executive Committee. In 1991, he was elected to the party's central committee, and was elected to the party's National Executive Committee and to serve on its working committee at an ANC congress held in Durban in July later that year. He did not stand for re-election as COSATU Assistant General Secretary that year. He was an SACP delegate at the Convention for a Democratic South Africa working group, which dealt with the future of the independent Bantustans, or homelands.

== Government of South Africa ==
=== Minister of Safety and Security: 1994–1999 ===
After the 1994 general election, Mufamadi was appointed as Minister of Safety and Security in the Government of National Unity until 1999, after having served on the sub-council on law and order of the Transitional Executive Council.

==== Post-apartheid transition and political violence ====
Mufamadi was widely acknowledged to have received a difficult portfolio, in part because he inherited the apartheid-era police forces—split across twelve different police agencies, including police forces in the former bantustans—and was tasked by the Interim Constitution with unifying them in a single, professionalised South African Police Service (SAPS) under civilian control. Moreover, his department's governing legislation, the South African Police Service Act, was not finalised and enacted until late 1995. The incumbent National Police Commissioner, Johan van der Merwe, was himself a holdover from the apartheid-era South African Police; when he announced his retirement in January 1995, press reported that he did so under pressure from Mufamadi. Mufamadi maintained a moratorium on police recruitment between August 1994 and May 1997, when he announced a major recruitment drive, which he said would proceed in terms of his department's new and more stringent policies on police recruitment. Also in 1997, he announced a plan to require all police officers to sign performance-based contracts, which he said would improve police performance and help restore public confidence in the police.

Mufamadi's department also inherited the political violence of the apartheid era and apartheid transition. Azhar Cachalia, who was head of the safety and security secretariat under Mufamadi, said in 1995 that the department viewed police work as critical to the success of the ongoing Truth and Reconciliation Commission, because the government could not induce participation in the commission unless it could credibly threaten prosecution of those who failed to disclose their apartheid-era crimes. Some of the worst political violence had occurred—and continued to simmer—between supporters of the ANC and supporters of its coalition partner, the Inkatha Freedom Party (IFP), and Mufamadi undertook several related initiatives. In September 1994, he appointed Frank Dutton to lead a commission of inquiry into allegations that there were political hit squads operating illicitly in the KwaZulu Police. The KwaZulu-based IFP reacted with hostility; the IFP government in KwaZulu-Natal said that it would not cooperate with the inquiry, and IFP leader Mangosuthu Buthelezi strongly hinted that the party would withdraw from the coalition government if the inquiry proceeded. Later, Mufamadi established the Independent Task Unit, a team of lawyers and investigators that ultimately was fairly successful in its investigations of collaborations between IFP members and a so-called Third Force supported by the apartheid government. In addition, in advance of gatherings planned in 1996 to commemorate the anniversary of the Shell House massacre, Mufamadi laid down controversial regulations on the carrying of so-called traditional weapons, often used in political violence in KwaZulu-Natal.

==== Foreign affairs ====
After the South African intervention in neighbouring Lesotho in 1998, Mufamadi was involved in political mediation in Lesotho and led the South African Development Community delegation that observed the launch of the country's transitional government.

=== Minister of Provincial and Local Government: 1999–2008 ===
Mufamadi has been the Minister of Provincial and Local Government since 17 June 1999. Following the resignation of President Mbeki in September 2008, Mufamadi was among those members of the Cabinet who submitted their resignations on September 23.

== Subsequent career ==
=== Academia and business: 2008–present ===
Ahead of the April 2009 general election, several ANC branches nominated Mufamadi to stand for re-election to Parliament, but he did not appear on the party's final list of candidates in the election. Instead, Mufamadi completed his doctoral dissertation, obtaining his degree in 2009. He became affiliated with the University of Johannesburg, where he was appointed in 2011 as the director of the School of Leadership—later renamed the Centre for Public Policy and African Studies—and where his research interests include industrial policy and peace and conflict studies. He has also chaired the university's Public and Environmental Economics Research Centre.

During the same period, Mufamadi accepted several private-sector directorships, including positions on the board of Impala Platinum and its subsidiary Zimplats, where he later served as chairman. He was also appointed to public entities; Gauteng provincial minister Nkosiphendule Kolisile appointed him as deputy chairperson of the Gauteng Gambling Board in 2013, and national Public Enterprises Minister Pravin Gordhan appointed him to the board of Transnet in 2018.

However, Mufamadi retreated from frontline ANC politics over this time, with some limited exceptions. In June 2012, addressing a local ANC branch in Liliesleaf Farm, he criticized the party's prevailing political and policy direction, saying to those who had celebrated Mbeki's ousting that, "[T]he time has finally come to let the curtain fall on the victory celebration... The time has come to contemplate how to better the movement." In December 2017, during the ANC conference where Cyril Ramaphosa succeeded Zuma as party president, Mufamadi told Radio 702 that Zuma should be removed from the national presidency immediately after the conference, saying that "he has got nothing of value to add" and it was time for a "fresh start". In early 2020 Mufamadi told News24 that he believed that the "quality of governance" had improved since Ramaphosa's ascension, after a "debilitating" decline during Zuma's presidency.

=== Ramaphosa presidency: 2018–present ===
After Ramaphosa became national president in early 2018, he announced in June 2018 that he would appoint a high-level review panel to assess the mandate and integrity of the State Security Agency (SSA), amid allegations that the agency had been subject to political capture during Zuma's presidency. Mufamadi was appointed to chair the panel. His confidential report to the president was finalised in December 2018, and Ramaphosa announced in his 2019 State of the Nation Address that he would undertake major reforms of the security services on the basis of Mufamadi's findings.

As was revealed when a redacted portion of the report was published later in 2019, Mufamadi had found serious problems at the SSA; he accused Zuma's presidential office and several of Zuma's ministers of involvement in "the manipulation of the SSA for factional purposes". Among other things, Mufamadi recommended—and Ramaphosa undertook—a restructuring of the SSA to split its foreign intelligence and domestic intelligence functions. Mufamadi later testified about his findings at the Zondo Commission.

In August 2020, Ramaphosa enlisted Mufamadi's services again, appointing him and former deputy president Baleka Mbete as his special envoys to neighbouring Zimbabwe amid a wave of civil unrest and increased state repression by Zimbabwean President Emmerson Mnangagwa.

A year later, in a cabinet reshuffle announced on 5 August 2021, President Ramaphosa appointed Mufamadi to succeed Charles Nqakula as his National Security Advisor. In that capacity, Mufamadi undertook diplomatic initiatives related to the Russian invasion of Ukraine and South Africa's worsening relations with the United States; his handling of both was admired by the Africa Report. He also chaired the selection panel that recommended the appointment of Fannie Masemola as National Police Commissioner, and in 2024 he was Ramaphosa's special envoy to Mozambique during an outbreak of post-election violence there.

== Personal life ==
Mufamadi is married and has three children.

His wife, Nomusa Mufamadi, is a businesswoman and accountant. In 2003, press uncovered that she was a significant shareholder in the South African Oil Company, a private company registered in the Cayman Islands that was majority-owned by Nigerian businessman Kase Lawal and that had benefitted from a dubious bilateral oil contract between the South African and Nigerian governments. Mufamadi denied any impropriety, saying that he had declared his wife's interest in the company in a confidential section of the parliamentary register and that he was capable of averting any potential conflicts of interest. In 2006, in a separate exposé, Pretoria News reported that his wife's company had been improperly awarded a contract with the Gauteng Department of Transport.
