= South African Local Government Association =

South African political association

The South African Local Government Association
- Nickname: SALGA
- Headquarters: Pretoria, Gauteng, South Africa
- Region served: South Africa
- Official language: English
- Key people: Bheki Stofile (President); Sithole Mbanga (CEO)
- Website: salga.org.za

The South African Local Government Association (SALGA) is a national, voluntary political association in South Africa. It is a public entity composed of South Africa's local governments. The association's members are made of all South Africa's 257 local governments.

The purpose of SALGA is to represent local governments of South Africa at various stages and levels of government. It supports local governments in their efforts of development, assists members in varying ways, and even works to promote women in local government.

There has been criticism that the SALGA is weak and ineffective at representing local government interests.

== Local Government in South Africa ==
Municipalities of South Africa, 2016

The Constitution of South Africa enshrines the many roles and powers of local and municipal government. South Africa is a developmental state, in the context that the social development is promoted through the state intervening in the economy.

Per section 152, this means that economic and social development relies heavily on municipalities. Section 152 is part of Chapter 7 of the Constitution, which features policy on local government. Section 151 states the many rights municipalities have in governance of their communities. It also states the restrictions of the national and provincial government in infringing on the governmental power of municipalities. Municipalities have broad authorities and power, much more codified than in many other countries.

Scholars including Van der Waldt and Thornhill assert that the nexus of public service delivery in South Africa is local government. Local government is not simply a single municipality, but a whole, separate sphere of government. It is the closet government to the people.

== History ==
Local, provincial, and national government must work together in South Africa. The South African Local Government Association was created in 1997 to better ensure this, as heavy emphasis was placed on the importance of local and municipal governments in South Africa's development. The 1997 Organised Local Government Act recognizes the South African Local Government Association. Section 21 of the 1973 Companies Act recognized its status as a public entity.

The constitution governing the SALGA was adopted in the year 2000. It was amended in 2004, with substantive changes to membership policies, creating three categories of membership. The constitution of the SALGA was again amended in 2007, adding various changes pertaining to its governance structure.

The SALGA is tied into international donor politics as well. In the later 1990s, the US National Democratic Institute for International Affairs (NDI) had a goal of strengthening countries' legislatures to ensure their governments are more accountable to their citizens. Ethics codes and comparable legislation were among the activities to develop "structural framework for local government". The main project included the SALGA among various other South African agencies, organizations, and provincial legislatures in a USAID program that provided over $3.8 million in funding. The project was also supplemented by another project that studied parliaments of other countries to increase the effectiveness of legislatures; it was received around $270,000 from the US funded National Endowment for Democracy (NED).

== Structure ==
Fees from members, donors for various projects, various other sources, and funds from the national budget provide funding for the SALGA.

The South African Local Government Association is structured in two main divisions; its political structure and administrative structure.

The political structure consists of the organization's arm in developing policy. It is divided into the National Executive Committee and the Provincial Conferences. The National Executive Committee is divided into the National Conference, National Executive Committee, Working Groups, and the chief executive officer. The Provincial Conference is structured into the Provincial Conference, Provincial Member Assembly, Provincial Executive Committee, Working Groups, and the Provincial Executive Officer. The National Executive Committee and the Provincial Conferences aim to implement policy.

The administrative organization is structured in a way that the SALGA can easily work with support municipalities, to ensure that they can provide services to their communities. It is organized into eight directorates, led by the office of the CEO. The current chief executive officer is Xolile George.

The eight directorates are the Provincial Offices, Governance and IGR, Strategy, Policy & Research, Municipal Institutional Development, Economic Development & Development Planning, Municipal Infrastructure & Services, Community Development, and Finance & Corporate Services.

The SALGA has ten permanent seats on the National Council of Provinces, though these are not voting delegates.

The South African Local Government Association releases an Annual Performance Plan (APP).

== Role and function ==
Local government in South Africa is strong and the South African Local Government Association is another avenue for local governments to meet their goals of development and providing services. The SALGA advocates for local and municipal interests at the provincial and national political levels. It analyzes and attempts to offer solutions to problems faced by local and municipal governments. It analyzes numerous elements of local and municipal government, sharing findings and recommendations with all its members. The SALGA supports and advises localities in various manners, to promote and sustain development in communities.

The South African local Government Association has many mandates. This includes aiding and counseling members, advocating on behalf of municipalities to various stakeholders, standing as a body to represent members, and "contributing to the positioning of local government". Regarding local economic development planning (LED), it cannot direct support to a particular local authority. There are services intended to build up LED which the SALGA cannot direct the delivery of these services. SALGA has many mandated roles to improve LED.

The SALGA works to coordinate LED throughout the country, through the project known as LED networks. The network gathers and shares information about LED to localities throughout the country. The association works on LED internationally with the Commonwealth Local Government Association and the Swedish Association of Local Authorities and Regions.

The SALGA advocates for local government and municipalities at other levels of government, and it works to foster positive intergovernmental relations between the other government spheres and local government. The SALGA, following prescriptions of the Intergovernmental Relations (IGR) Framework Act, supports various IGR policies, structures, and institutions. The association also works to ensure local government input is included in the national budget.

A study of the South African Local Government Association found that regarding LED, there are two ways SALGA and its activities could maintain a crucial role. The first is that it could foster a better understanding of what LED is and the role municipalities and local governments have in it. This will also raise awareness of LED. The second is that the data SALGA supplies for local planning, along with the support of localities to understand LED networks and economic chains, leads to stimulation of local economies, which contributes to alleviating poverty.

The SALGA takes action to empower women and support gender equality in local government. The 2006 election saw a 50:50 campaign ran by SALGA to promote equal gender councillor representation. The association also organizes summits and conferences for women in local government.

== Actions taken by the SALGA ==
The SALGA publishes a magazine entitled Voice of the Local Government in association with Picasso Headline, which is part of the Tiso Blackstar Group. This magazine concerns local government and municipalities, boosting the visibility of the issues concerning them. It features content regarding the transformation of local governments and developmental service delivery.

In 2006, the South African Local Government Association implemented a program that was part of the Development Bank of Southern Africa's "Operation Siyenza Manzi". The program was run in collaboration with DPLG and the National Treasury.

In 2007, the SALGA published a report on municipal affairs, explaining what weakened municipality performance. Findings include that councillors' duties are not clearly defined, their offices lack legal support, and lack counseling when making decisions. The South African Local Government Association partnered with other institutions, including the University of Pretoria to provide relevant programming to local governments. Executive leadership and management is among this programming.

In 2009, the South African Local Government Association received a study it commissioned on the arrangements of internal municipal governments and municipal service delivery. The study found political parties interfered in the function of municipalities' administrations. Many municipal political appointments were due to political loyalties rather than merit. The reports' authors found that this could have destructive consequences on municipal governments.

In 2010, the SALGA developed a plan to ensure municipalities and local communities could all receive benefits brought in from the 2010 World Cup.

In 2014, the City of Johannesburg expressed concern that its expansion would mean that landfill sites would be unable to be hidden in the coming years. The SALGA intervened and appealed to other cities and municipalities in the province to find creative solutions to this issue. The SALGA provided a waste management specialist to aid in resolving the crisis.

The 2016 Annual Performance Plan (APP) features much reflection, as the twentieth anniversary of the association approached. The Plan identified municipalities' key problem areas. A ten-point plan was featured, containing actions and recommendations to improve community experiences. The Plan featured a revenue model, which was questioned by members at the National Assembly meeting discussing the APP. This questioning was due to the number of municipalities being reduced from 278 to 257; members expressed this could affect their model. Members also questioned the claim that the SALGA was capacitating municipalities. They wanted to know the plans and actions SALGA would take to deliver through these claims.

In June 2017, then South African Local Government Association President, Parks Tau, addressed the Council of Mayors in Cape Town. He expressed that a "capable and developmental state", especially locally, can implement the goals of the SALGA. The SALGA national executive committee recommended that new and innovative revenue streams were needed to fund local spheres of government. Tau proposed various types of bonds, as well as public private partnerships to accomplish this. He also remarked on the need to work with government and parliament to achieve these goals.

== Criticism ==
The South African Local Government Association has faced criticism regarding its effectiveness, as shown in a study conducted by the Department and Ministry of Provincial and Local Government. The SALGA is seen as lacking the ability to effectively advocate for local and municipal interests and bring about change and substantive policy.

In 2016, SALGA had been waiting over eight years for a Departmental grant. The absence of this grant hindered many of its proposed and desired activities.

The South African Local Government Association was criticized by members at a 2016 National Assembly meeting regarding its response to municipalities suffering from drought. Some members remarked that SALGA should be more bold in its recommendations to combat the drought and its effects.

The SALGA, along with general municipalities, was criticized as hindering the expression of freedom of speech, because different restrictions and policies prevented people from protesting mining and other work. Critics called for SALGA to comply with court rulings, ensure staff are trained in knowing protest policy, to investigate impartially allegations of improper restrictions on protesting, and that there is appropriate discipline for localities implementing improper protest policy.

== List of national chairpersons ==
- Thabo Manyoni (2011–2016)
- Parks Tau (2016–2019)
- Thembi Simelane (2019–2021)
