= Alexandra Abrahams =

South African politician

The Honourable Alexandra Abrahams MP

Deputy Minister of Electricity and Energy
- Incumbent
- Assumed office 30 June 2026
- President: Cyril Ramaphosa
- Preceded by: Samantha Graham-Maré

Deputy Minister of Trade, Industry and Competition
- In office 17 November 2025 – 30 June 2026
- President: Cyril Ramaphosa
- Preceded by: Andrew Whitfield
- Succeeded by: John Steenhuisen

Shadow Deputy Minister of Social Development
- In office 5 December 2020 – 14 June 2024
- Leader: John Steenhuisen
- Preceded by: Thandi Mpambo-Sibhukwana
- Succeeded by: Position vacant

Member of the National Assembly of South Africa
- Incumbent
- Assumed office 22 May 2019

Personal details
- Born: Alexandra Lilian Amelia Abrahams; 13 July 1986 (age 40)
- Party: Democratic Alliance
- Education: Stellenbosch University
- Occupation: Member of Parliament
- Profession: Politician

Alexandra Lilian Amelia Abrahams (born 13 July 1986) is a South African politician who has been the Deputy Minister of Electricity and Energy since June 2026 and a Member of the National Assembly since May 2019. She was the Deputy Minister of Trade, Industry and Competition between November 2025 and June 2026. She served as Shadow Deputy Minister of Social Development from December 2020 until June 2024. Abrahams is a member of the Democratic Alliance.

== Biography ==
Abrahams obtained an honours degree in political science from Stellenbosch University. She also has an undergraduate degree in international relations.

Abrahams joined the Democratic Alliance in 2009, when she became the assistant to the party's provincial campaign manager for that year's general election. Two years later, she found employment at the provincial Department of Social Development. She worked for the department until May 2019.

Abrahams was placed third on the DA's regional list for the general election on 8 May 2019. As a result of the DA's electoral performance, Abrahams was elected. She was sworn in as a Member of the National Assembly on 22 May 2019. On 27 June 2019, she was appointed as an Alternate Member of the Portfolio Committee on Social Development.

In December 2020, the DA parliamentary leader, John Steenhuisen, appointed her to his shadow cabinet as Shadow Deputy Minister of Social Development. Abrahams was re-elected to Parliament in the 2024 general election. With the DA entering into a national coalition government with the ANC, Abrahams' tenure as Shadow Deputy Minister came to an end.

== National government ==
On 12 November 2025, Abrahams was appointed as the Deputy Minister of Trade, Industry and Competition by president Cyril Ramaphosa, following a request by Steenhuisen. She replaced Andrew Whitfield, who was sacked by Ramaphosa in June. She was sworn into office on 17 November 2025.

On 17 June 2026, the newly elected DA leader Geordin Hill-Lewis requested that Ramaphosa appoint her as the Deputy Minister of Electricity and Energy. Ramaphosa acceded to Hill-Lewis's request on 30 June 2026.
