= Zolile Burns-Ncamashe =

South African politician and traditional leader (born 1965)

Zolile Burns-Ncamashe MP

Deputy Minister of Cooperative Governance and Traditional Affairs
- Incumbent
- Assumed office 6 March 2023 Serving with Dickson Masemola (since June 2024)
- President: Cyril Ramaphosa
- Minister: Thembi Nkadimeng; Velenkosi Hlabisa
- Preceded by: Obed Bapela

Member of the National Assembly

Assembly Member for Eastern Cape
- Incumbent
- Assumed office 19 February 2021

Personal details
- Born: 13 September 1965 (age 60) Alice, South Africa
- Party: African National Congress
- Education: Lovedale College
- Alma mater: University of Fort Hare
- Nickname: Aa! Zweliyajika!

Prince Zolile Burns-Ncamashe Aa! Zweliyajika! (born 13 September 1965) is a South African politician from the Eastern Cape. He has served as the Deputy Minister of Cooperative Governance and Traditional Affairs since March 2023. A traditional leader of the amaRharhabe clan, he joined the National Assembly as a representative of the African National Congress in February 2021. As AmaGwali Prince his praise name (isikhahlelo) is Zweliyijika.

== Early life and education ==
Burns-Ncamashe was born on 13 September 1965 in Alice in the present-day Eastern Cape. He was educated at Gwali Primary School and Lovedale College. His father, Sipho Burns-Ncamashe, was a Xhosa traditional leader, the Rharhabe praise poet, and later a Ciskei politician.

He has a Bachelor of Arts in philosophy and psychology and an Honours in philosophy from the University of Fort Hare. In 2019 he completed a Master's degree in social science at Fort Hare. As of 2021 he was a part-time PhD candidate at the same university, with doctoral research on land reform.

== Traditional leadership ==
Burns-Ncamashe was an advisor, counsellor and spokesperson to the Rharhabe royal family, serving under successive monarchs King Maxhob'ayakhawuleza Sandile Aa! Zanesizwe! from 1991 until his death in 2011, then under Queen Noloyiso Sandile Aa! Noloyiso! from 2011 until her death in 2020, and under King Jonguxolo Sandile Aa! Vululwandle! from 2020 until he became Deputy Minister of Cooperative Governance and Traditional Affairs under President Cyril Ramaphosa in 2023. He was a member of the Eastern Cape House of Traditional Leaders between 1996 and 2017 and served as its deputy chairperson under Ngangomhlaba Matanzima from 2002 to 2017. In 1997, he was additionally sworn in to the National House of Traditional Leaders.

== Political career ==
Burns-Ncamashe became politically active in the students' movement during apartheid and became a member of the anti-apartheid Congress of Traditional Leaders of South Africa. Decades later, he became involved in the post-apartheid national government during the first term of President Cyril Ramaphosa, initially as a traditional affairs advisor to Zweli Mkhize, the Minister of Cooperative Governance and Traditional Affairs. Later he was the chairperson of the Department of Water and Sanitation's National Rapid Response Task Team, established by Minister Lindiwe Sisulu in 2019.

In the 2019 general election, Burns-Ncamashe stood for election to the South African Parliament as a candidate for the governing African National Congress (ANC), but, ranked 22nd on the party list for the Eastern Cape, he was not initially elected. He was sworn in to the National Assembly on 19 February 2021, filling the casual vacancy that arose after Tozama Mantashe's death from COVID-19 complications. Later that month, he became a member of the Portfolio Committee on Trade and Industry, and he served as the head of the ANC's constituency office in Butterworth, Eastern Cape.

On 6 March 2023, in a cabinet reshuffle, President Ramaphosa appointed Burns-Ncamashe as Deputy Minister of Cooperative Governance and Traditional Affairs. In that capacity he led the ministry's awareness campaign on initiation deaths. In the next general election, held in May 2024, he was re-elected to a full term in the National Assembly, and President Ramaphosa retained him in his post as deputy minister, though Dickson Masemola was appointed to serve alongside him as second deputy minister.

== Personal life ==
His wife is Nkosikazi Nozinzile Burns-Ncamashe. They married in 2005 and have three children.

In February 2024, he was ordained as a deacon in the Ethiopian Episcopal Church.
