= Mzamo Buthelezi =

South African politician

Inkosi Mzamo Buthelezi MP
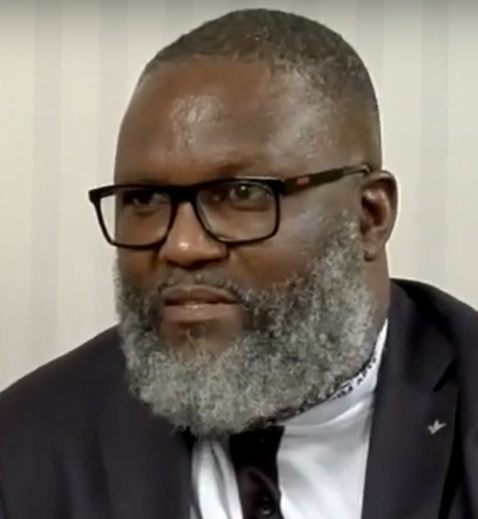

Minister of Public Service and Administration
- Incumbent
- Assumed office 3 July 2024
- President: Cyril Ramaphosa
- Deputy: Pinky Kekana
- Preceded by: Noxolo Kiviet

Personal details
- Born: Elphas Mfakazeleni Buthelezi
- Party: Inkatha Freedom Party

Inkosi Elphas Mfakazeleni "Mzamo" Buthelezi is a South African politician who is a member of the National Assembly of South Africa from the Inkatha Freedom Party. He was first elected at the 2019 South African general election and re-elected at the 2024 general election.

He is also a chieftain of the Buthelezi clan of Zulus. He is a former mayor of Zululand District Municipality and currently serves as the deputy president of the Inkatha Freedom Party.
