= Velenkosini Hlabisa =

South African politician (born 1965)

The Honourable Velenkosini Hlabisa MP
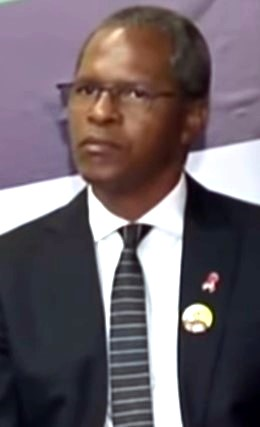

Minister of Cooperative Governance and Traditional Affairs
- Incumbent
- Assumed office 3 July 2024
- President: Cyril Ramaphosa
- Deputy: Dickson Masemola and Zolile Burns-Ncamashe
- Preceded by: Thembi Nkadimeng

President of the Inkatha Freedom Party
- Incumbent
- Assumed office 25 August 2019
- Deputy: Mzamo Buthelezi
- Preceded by: Mangosuthu Buthelezi

Member of the National Assembly of South Africa
- Incumbent
- Assumed office 19 October 2023
- Preceded by: Mangosuthu Buthelezi

Leader of the Opposition in the KwaZulu-Natal Legislature
- In office 22 May 2019 – 18 October 2023
- Premier: Sihle Zikalala; Nomusa Dube-Ncube
- Preceded by: Zwakele Mncwango
- Succeeded by: Blessed Gwala

Member of the KwaZulu-Natal Legislature
- In office 22 May 2019 – 18 October 2023

Mayor of the Big Five Hlabisa Local Municipality
- In office 3 August 2016 – 22 May 2019
- Preceded by: Position established

Personal details
- Born: Velenkosini Fiki Hlabisa; 4 January 1965 (age 61) Hlabisa, Natal, South Africa
- Party: Inkatha Freedom Party
- Education: University of Zululand; University of South Africa

Velenkosini Fiki Hlabisa (born 4 January 1965) is a South African politician and former teacher who is currently serving as Minister of Cooperative Governance and Traditional Affairs in the Government of National Unity (GNU) since June 2024. He is the leader of the Inkatha Freedom Party.

He has been President of the Inkatha Freedom Party (IFP) since 2019 and a member of South Africa's National Assembly where he serves as his party's leader since October 2023. He previously served as the Secretary-General of the IFP from 2011 to 2017, as the Mayor of the Big Five Hlabisa Local Municipality from 2016 to 2019 and as the Leader of the Opposition in the KwaZulu-Natal Legislature between 2019 and 2023.

Hlabisa currently serves as the Minister of Cooperative Governance and Traditional Affairs.

== Early life, education and career ==
Velenkosini Fiki Hlabisa was born on 4 January 1965 in Hlabisa, Northern Natal. He is the eldest of four children born to David and Thembani Hlabisa. He joined the IFP Youth Brigade at the age of thirteen in 1978 and matriculated from high school in 1983. Hlabisa then proceeded to study at the University of Zululand and the University of South Africa. His father died while he was at university in 1990. In 1991, he sought employment as a teacher and worked as one at Ngebeza High School for five years and soon as principal of Somfula High School for twenty years.

== Political career ==
In the 1995 municipal elections, Hlabisa was elected a municipal councillor for the town of Hlabisa. He continuously served as a municipal councillor for twenty-four years, during which he was Mayor of the Big Five Hlabisa Local Municipality from 2016 to 2019. In May 2019, he was elected to the KwaZulu-Natal Legislature and given the title of Leader of the Opposition due to the IFP reclaiming the title of second-largest party in the province. Hlabisa is a member of the legislature's Finance committee.

=== IFP leadership ===
Since joining the IFP in 1978, Hlabisa had risen through the party's leadership ranks. He was elected Secretary-General of the party in 2011. In 2017, the IFP's Extended National Council unanimously endorsed Hlabisa to succeed Mangosuthu Buthelezi as party president. Hlabisa was elected unopposed as the new leader of the IFP at the party's 35th National General Conference held in August 2019.

=== Parliamentary career ===
On 16 October 2023, IFP spokesperson Mkhuleko Hlengwa announced that the party's National Executive Committee had resolved that Hlabisa would take up the late Mangosuthu Buthelezi's seat in the National Assembly. Party chief whip in the provincial legislature Blessed Gwala was appointed the party's new caucus leader in the legislature. Hlabisa was sworn in as a Member of Parliament on 19 October 2023.

Following the 2024 South African general election he now serves as the Minister of Cooperative Governance and Traditional Affairs.

Political offices
Preceded by Zwakele Mncwango	Leader of the Opposition in the KwaZulu-Natal Legislature; 2019–2023	Succeeded by Blessed Gwala
Party political offices
Preceded by Mangosuthu Buthelezi	President of the Inkatha Freedom Party; 2019–present	Incumbent
