= Minister of Cooperative Governance and Traditional Affairs =

South African government minister

South Africa Minister of Cooperative Governance and Traditional Affairs
- Coat of Arms

- Flag of South Africa

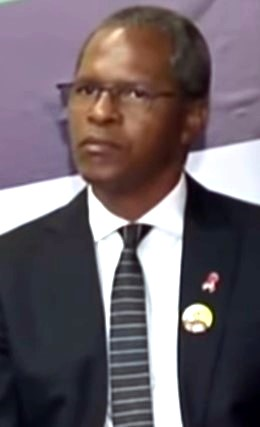
- Incumbent; Velenkosini Hlabisa since 2 July 2024
- Department of Cooperative Governance; Department of Traditional Affairs
- Style: The Honourable
- Appointer: President of South Africa
- Inaugural holder: Sicelo Shiceka
- Formation: 10 May 2009
- Deputy: Deputy Minister of Cooperative Governance; Deputy Minister of Traditional Affairs
- Salary: R2,211,937
- Website: Department of Cooperative Governance and Traditional Affairs

The minister of cooperative governance and traditional affairs is the minister in the Cabinet of South Africa who is responsible for the Department of Cooperative Governance and the Department of Traditional Affairs.

The office was called the minister of provincial and local government from June 1999 until May 2009, when the minister assumed responsibility for traditional leadership institutions. Before June 1999, the office was the minister of constitutional development and provincial affairs. In his first cabinet, President Thabo Mbeki transferred responsibility for the portfolio of constitutional development to the minister of justice and constitutional development, where it remained thereafter.

== List of ministers ==
List of ministers responsible for cooperative governance, 1994–present
Ministry	Minister	Term		Party	President
Constitutional Development and Provincial Affairs	Roelf Meyer	1994	1996	NP	Nelson Mandela
Constitutional Development and Provincial Affairs	Valli Moosa	1996	1999	ANC	Nelson Mandela
Provincial and Local Affairs	Sydney Mufamadi	1999	2008	ANC	Thabo Mbeki
Provincial and Local Affairs	Sicelo Shiceka	2008	2009	ANC	Kgalema Motlanthe
Cooperative Governance and Traditional Affairs	Sicelo Shiceka	2009	2011	ANC	Jacob Zuma
Cooperative Governance and Traditional Affairs	Richard Baloyi	2011	2013	ANC	Jacob Zuma
Cooperative Governance and Traditional Affairs	Lech Tsenoli	2013	2014	ANC	Jacob Zuma
Cooperative Governance and Traditional Affairs	Pravin Gordhan	2014	2015	ANC	Jacob Zuma
Cooperative Governance and Traditional Affairs	Des van Rooyen	2015	2018	ANC	Jacob Zuma
Cooperative Governance and Traditional Affairs	Zweli Mkhize	2018	2019	ANC	Cyril Ramaphosa
Cooperative Governance and Traditional Affairs	Nkosazana Dlamini-Zuma	2019	2023	ANC	Cyril Ramaphosa
Cooperative Governance and Traditional Affairs	Thembi Nkadimeng	2023	2024	ANC	Cyril Ramaphosa
Cooperative Governance and Traditional Affairs	Velenkosini Hlabisa	2024	–	IFP	Cyril Ramaphosa
