= State-owned enterprises of South Africa =

State-owned enterprises play a significant role in the South African economy. In key sectors such as electricity, transport, and telecoms, SOEs play a lead role, often defined by law. However, limited competition is allowed in some sectors, such as telecoms and aviation. The government's interest in these sectors often competes with, and at times discourages, foreign investment.

The Department of Public Enterprises (DPE) is the shareholder representative of the South African Government, with oversight responsibility for state-owned enterprises in key sectors. Some companies are not directly controlled by the Department of Public Enterprises, but by various other departments. Further, not all state owned entities are registered as companies.

The Department of Public Enterprises minister has publicly stated that South Africa's SOEs should advance economic transformation, industrialization and import substitution. DPE has oversight responsibility in full or in part for seven of the approximately 700 SOEs that exist at the national, provincial, and local levels. These are Alexkor, Denel, Eskom, Transnet, South African Express, The South African Forestry Company, and the SABC.

These seven SOEs employ approximately 105,000 people. The state's share of the investment in them was 21%, while the private sector contributed 63%. Government spending made up the remaining 16%. The IMF estimates that the debt of the SOEs would add 13.5% to the overall national debt.

== History ==
Many state-owned firms were established during the apartheid era to counter the impact of international sanctions against the country. The ANC government initially sold stakes in the companies, and lowered import tariffs. Those measures were reversed following opposition from COSATU and the South African Communist Party. By 2007, an alliance of unions and leftist factions within the ANC had unseated President Thabo Mbeki, replacing him with Jacob Zuma. The new ANC policy aimed at expanding the role of SOEs in the economy, following the example of China.

Although in 2015 and 2016, senior government leaders discussed allowing private-sector investment into some of the more than 700 state-owned enterprises and recently released a report of a presidential review commission on SOE, which called for nationalization of SOEs, no concrete action has been taken on the topic yet.

=== Financial troubles and corruption ===
By the end of the Zuma administration in 2018 corruption within South African state owned enterprises by individuals connected to government such as the controversial Gupta family had led to many enterprises facing deep financial difficulty. Deepening financial issues, mismanagement, maladministration and government bailouts of enterprises such as the South African Broadcasting Corporation, South African Airways, Eskom, Denel, PRASA, and Transnet caused increased public controversy.

By the end of the 2015–16 financial year, combined government guarantees on debts owed by state owned enterprises had reached R467 billion (equivalent to US$33.1 billion) and were expected to reach R500 billion by 2020 representing 10 percent of South Africa's GDP. The situation at Eskom was regarded as so serious as to lead the South African business newspaper Business Day to speculate that it could cause a national banking crisis.

In 2021, the South African Treasury reported that South African Airways had accumulated a total loss between 2008 and 2020 of R32 billion (US$ 2.1 billion) and received a total of R60 billion (US$ 4 billion) in government guarantees.

== Table list ==
The Public Finance Management Act distinguishes between three types of public entities. Schedule 1 entities compromise Constitutional Institutions including the Independent Electoral Commission and Public Protector among others. Schedule 2 entities are listed as Major Public Entities and have greater autonomy than Schedule 3 entities. Schedule 2 entities are listed below. Schedule 3 entities are subdivided into:

- National Public Entities - which generally function as specialised agencies or not-for-profit organisations such as the Companies and Intellectual Property Commission, the Human Sciences Research Council and the Road Accident Fund;
- National Government Business Enterprises - which function as profit-seeking businesses including the Council for Scientific and Industrial Research, Passenger Rail Agency of South Africa and Rand Water;
- Provincial Public Entities - which have a provincial focus and function as provincial agencies such as the Gautrain Management Agency and various provincial gambling and liquor boards;
- Provincial Government Business Enterprises - which are profit-seeking businesses controlled by provincial government and includes the Richards Bay Industrial Development Zone and the East London Industrial Development Zone.

List of South African Schedule 2 Major Public Entities. FY2019/2020 Data.
Name	Industry	Notes	Employees	Revenue	Profit/(Loss)	Ownership type	Established
Air Traffic and Navigation Services Company	Air Traffic Control	Manages air traffic and navigation within South Africa and part of the Southern Indian and Atlantic Oceans		R1.673bn	R0.067bn	Fully state owned	1993
Airports Company South Africa (ACSA)	Airport management	Owner and operator of major airports.	3,110	R2.86bn	R0.23bn	74.6% state owned	1993
Alexkor	Mining	Diamond mining.	859	R0.2bn	R0.03bn	Fully state owned	1992
Armscor (South Africa)	Arms procurement	Arms procurement agency for the SANDF.	1,467	R1.75bn	R0.23bn	Fully state owned	1968
Broadband Infraco	Telecommunications	Long distance & international internet connectivity.	166	R0.41bn	(R0.01bn)	Fully state owned	2007
Central Energy Fund	Research & Development	Energy development. Parent company of PetroSA.	2,107	R13.2bn	(R0.45bn)	Fully state owned	1954
Denel	Arms procurement	Armaments manufacturer.	3,968	R3.76bn	(R1.75bn)	Fully state owned	1992
Development Bank of Southern Africa	Banking	Funding for social and economic infrastructure.	492	R5.6bn	R3.1bn	Fully state owned	1983
Eskom	Public utility	Electrical production, transmission and distribution monopoly.	46,665	R179.8bn	(R20.7bn)	Fully state owned	1923
Independent Development Trust	Social Development	Supports education, housing, health services and business development projects (not profit-seeking)	279	R0.162bn	(R0.107bn)	Fully state owned	1990 (reconfigured 1999)
Industrial Development Corporation	Industrial Development	Shareholder in numerous companies and subsidiaries		R12.240bn	(R3.bn)	Fully state owned	1940
Land and Agricultural Development Bank of South Africa	Agricultural Finance	Development finance for farmers		R5.032bn	(R2.124bn)	Fully state owned	1912
South African Broadcasting Corporation	Broadcasting	South African public service broadcaster	3,167	R6.4bn	(R0.6bn)	Fully state owned	1936
South African Express	Transport	Regional airline	980			Fully state owned	1994
South African Forestry Company	Forestry	Manages forestry on state owned land	2,363	R0.93bn	(R0.08bn)	Fully state owned	1992
South African Nuclear Energy Corporation	Energy	Manages the Pelindaba research reactor	1,400	R2.702bn	(0.131bn)	Fully state owned	1999 (in current form)
South African Post Office	Postal services	National postal services	18,119	R4.5bn	(R0.9bn)	Fully state owned	1991
South African Airways	Transport	International airline	10,071	R30.7bn	(R5.4bn)	Fully state owned	1934
Telkom SA	Telecommunications	National telephone monopoly	18,286	R41bn	R4.9bn	55.3% state owned	1991
Trans-Caledon Tunnel Authority	Public utility	Water transport authority	141	R2.3bn	R2.1bn	Fully state owned	1986
Transnet	Transport	Railways, harbours, oil/fuel pipelines and terminals	55,946	R74bn	R6.04bn	Fully state owned	1990

List of other large South African public entities (Schedule 3) and companies in which the state is a shareholder. FY2019/2020 Data.
Name	Industry	Notes	Employees	Revenue	Profit/(Loss)	Ownership type	Established
Council for Scientific and Industrial Research	Research & Development	National research organisation	3,000	R2.5bn	R0.007bn	Fully state owned	1945
Passenger Rail Agency of South Africa	Railways	Passenger railway services	16,350	R13.65bn	(R1.69bn)	Fully state owned	1990
PetroSA	Energy	National oil and gas company	1,594	R10.3bn	(R1.6bn)	Fully state owned	1965
PBMR	Research & Development	Development of Pebble Bed Modular Reactor nuclear energy technology	900				1994
Rand Water	Public utility	Water utility for Gauteng province.	3,411	R13.4bn	R3.15bn	Fully state owned	1903
Sasol	Energy	International coal-liquefaction, petroleum refining and distribution.	30,100	US$21.7bn	US$3.11bn	27.3% state owned (mostly indirectly through the government employees pension fund)	1950
Sentech	Telecommunications	Telecommunications infrastructure	531	R1.4bn	R0.18bn	Fully state owned	1996
South African National Parks	Nature conservation	Owner and operator of national parks.	4,181	R2.6bn	R0.2bn	Fully state owned	1926
South African National Roads Agency	Infrastructure	Maintenance and development of the national road network	397	R3,6bn	R1.01bn	Fully state owned	1998
Vodacom	Telecommunications	Cellular services	7,554	R86.4bn	R24.5bn	13.9% state owned	1994

== Full list ==
As of July 2026, there are 123 entities listed by the South African Government as, "State-Owned Enterprises and Other Public Institutions". These include:

- Accounting Standards Board
- Agricultural Research Council (ARC)
- Air Traffic and Navigation Services Company
- Airports Company South Africa (ACSA)
- Alexkor Limited
- Armaments Corporation of South Africa (ARMSCOR)
- Blind SA
- Brand South Africa
- Breede-Gouritz CMA
- Broadband Infraco
- Broadcasting Complaints Commission of South Africa (BCCSA)
- Cape Town International Airport
- Central Energy Fund (CEF)
- Commission for Conciliation, Mediation and Arbitration
- Commission for Employment Equity
- Companies and Intellectual Property Commission (CIPC)
- Compensation Fund
- Competition Commission (The)
- Competition Tribunal
- Council for Geoscience
- Council for Medical Schemes
- Council on Higher Education
- Denel (Pty) Ltd
- Development Bank of Southern Africa (DBSA)
- Eskom
- Estate Agency Affairs Board (The)
- Export Credit Insurance Corporation of South Africa (Ltd.)
- Film and Publication Board (FPB)
- Financial Sector Conduct Authority (FSCA)
- Free State Development Corporation
- Freedom Park
- Government Employees Medical Scheme (GEMS)
- Government Employees Pension Fund (GEPF)
- Health and Welfare Sector Education and Training Authority (HWSETA)
- Health Professions Council of South Africa (HPCSA)
- Housing Development Agency (HDA)
- Human Sciences Research Council (HSRC)
- Independent Development Trust
- Industrial Development Corporation
- Ingonyama Trust Board
- Institute of People Management (IPM)
- Ithala Development Finance Corporation (Ltd)
- Khula Enterprise Finance (Ltd)
- King Shaka International Airport
- Land Bank
- Legal Aid South Africa
- Limpopo Economic Development Enterprise
- Media Development and Diversity Agency (MDDA)
- Mhlathuze Water
- Mining Qualification Authority
- Mintek (Council for Mineral Technology)
- National Advisory Council on Innovation (NACI)
- National Agricultural Marketing Council
- National Archives of South Africa (NASA)
- National Arts Council of South Africa (NACSA)
- National Consumer Commission (The) (NCC)
- National Credit Regulator (NCR)
- National Development Agency (NDA)
- National Economic Development and Labour Council (NEDLAC)
- National Electronic Media of South Africa (NEMISA)
- National Empowerment Fund
- National Energy Regulator (NERSA)
- National Film and Video Foundation
- National Gambling Board of South Africa
- National Home Builders Registration Council (NHBRC)
- National House of Traditional Leaders
- National Housing Finance Corporation (NHFC)
- National Lotteries Commission
- National Nuclear Regulator (NNR)
- National Peace Accord Trust (NPAT)
- National Student Financial Aid Scheme (NSFAS)
- National Transmission Company of South Africa (NTCSA)
- National Youth Development Agency (NYDA)
- Nelson Mandela Museum
- North West Development Corporation
- OR Tambo International Airport
- Passenger Rail Agency of South African (PRASA)
- Pebble Bed Modular Reactor (Pty) Limited (PBMR)
- Perishable Products Export Control Board
- PetroSA (Pty) Ltd
- Private Security Industry Regulatory Authority (PSIRA)
- Prudential Authority
- Public Investment Corporation (PIC)
- Rand Water
- Refugee Appeal Board
- Road Accident Fund (RAF)
- Road Traffic Infringement Agency (RTIA)
- Road Traffic Management Corporation (RTMC)
- Robben Island Museum
- Safety and Security, Sector Education & Training Authority (SASSETA)
- Small Enterprise Development Agency (SEDA)
- Small Enterprise Finance Agency (SEFA)
- South African Agency For Science and Technology Advancement (SAASTA)
- South African Airways (SAA)
- South African Broadcasting Corporation (SABC)
- South African Bureau of Standards (SABS)
- South African Civil Aviation Authority
- South African Council for Educators (SACE)
- South African Council for Social Service Professions (SACSSP)
- South African Diamond and Precious Metals Regulator
- South African Express
- South African Forestry Company (Ltd) (SAFCOL)
- South African Heritage Resources Agency
- South African Institute for Drug-Free Sport
- South African Library for the Blind
- South African Local Government Association (SALGA)
- South African National Accreditation System
- South African National Council for the Blind
- South African National Parks (SANParks)
- South African National Road Agency
- South African Nuclear Energy Corporation SOC Ltd (NECSA)
- South African Post Office (SAPO)
- South African Qualifications Authority (SAQA)
- South African Reserve Bank (SARB)
- South African Social Security Agency (SASSA)
- South African Special Risk Insurance Association (SASRIA)
- South African State Theatre - Pretoria
- South African Tourism
- South African Veterinary Council
- South African Weather Service (SAWS)
- Special Investigating Unit (SIU)
- State Information Technology Agency (SITA)
- Tax Ombud: South Africa
- Technology Innovation Agency
- Telkom SA (Ltd)
- Transnet (Ltd)
- Universal Service Agency and Access of South Africa
- Water Research Commission (WRC)

== See also ==
- Government of South Africa
- Minister of Public Enterprises
- Department of Public Enterprises
- List of companies of South Africa
