= Department of Planning, Monitoring and Evaluation =

South African national government department

Agency overview
- Formed: 2009; 17 years ago
- Preceding agencies: Department of Performance Monitoring and Evaluation; National Planning Commission Secretariat
- Type: National department
- Jurisdiction: Government of South Africa
- Headquarters: Union Buildings, East Wing, Government Avenue, Pretoria, Gauteng, South Africa
- Employees: 337 (2025)
- Annual budget: R532 million (2026–27)
- Minister of Planning, Monitoring and Evaluation responsible: Maropene Ramokgopa
- Deputy Minister of Planning, Monitoring and Evaluation responsible: Seiso Mohai
- Agency executive: Melanchton Makobe, Acting Director General
- Parent department: Office of the Presidency
- Key document: National Development Plan
- Website: dpme.gov.za

The Department of Planning, Monitoring and Evaluation (DPME) is a department in the South African national government. Established in 2009, it is led by the Minister of Planning, Monitoring and Evaluation. The DPME forms part of the Office of the Presidency, led by the Minister in the Presidency.

The department is responsible for coordinating and facilitating integrated planning, monitoring, and evaluation across the national government, to improve developmental outcomes and the impact of government programs as a whole.

== History ==
The department was established in 2009, as part of the reconfiguration of the Office of the Presidency by then-President Jacob Zuma, which created National Planning Commission and the Department of Performance Monitoring and Evaluation. The latter was the predecessor to the DPME.

In 2012, the National Development Plan (NDP) was adopted as South Africa's long-term development framework, providing a central reference point for the planning, monitoring, and evaluation functions that would subsequently be consolidated in the DPME. The plan set out a long-term goal of eliminating poverty and reducing inequality by 2030, and provided a framework for coordinating government policy and implementation.

In 2014, following the 2014 general election, then-President Jacob Zuma reorganized the national government and established the Department of Planning, Monitoring and Evaluation, replacing the Department of Performance Monitoring and Evaluation. The new department was created through the merger of the Department of Performance Monitoring and Evaluation with the National Planning Commission Secretariat in the Presidency, merging national planning with monitoring and evaluation functions, in a single department.

The National Planning Commission's functions were transferred from the Office of the Presidency to the new department with effect from 1 October 2014, while the transfer of budgets, staff, and assets was completed during the 2014–15 financial year.

In 2015, the reconfiguration of the department was completed with the transfer of the Ministry of Planning, Monitoring and Evaluation from the Presidency to the DPME. The National Planning Commission and National Youth Development Agency were also placed under the department's portfolio.

In 2019, the DPME introduced the Medium-Term Strategic Framework (MTSF) 2019–2024 as the implementation framework for the National Development Plan, during the sixth administration of South Africa. The framework translated the government's priorities into a set of medium-term outcomes and targets, and provided the basis for monitoring the implementation of government programs, and assessing progress towards the objectives of the NDP.

Following the 2024 general election and the formation of the Government of National Unity, the DPME began a transition from the Medium-Term Strategic Framework to a new Medium-Term Development Plan. The Medium-Term Development Plan 2024–2029 was developed as the strategic framework for the seventh administration of South Africa, integrating the GNU's Statement of Intent with the National Development Plan. The MTDP also established three overarching priorities – inclusive economic growth and job creation; reducing poverty and tackling the high cost of living; and building a capable, ethical, and developmental state.

Following the formation of South Africa's seventh administration in 2024, the functions of the former Department of Public Enterprises were incorporated into the DPME as part of the National Macro Organization of Government process. The change expanded the DPME's responsibilities to include the monitoring and reform of state-owned enterprises (SOEs). The DPME subsequently established a dedicated State-Owned Enterprises Reform Unit, and began coordinating work on the restructuring, rationalization, repurposing, and repositioning of major South African SOEs.

In 2025, the DPME began moving towards establishing a clearer statutory framework for planning, monitoring, and evaluation. The department had previously sought to strengthen its mandate through a Planning Bill, but subsequently decided to develop a White Paper on Planning, Monitoring and Evaluation. The department's 2026 Annual Performance Plan stated that the White Paper was intended to provide the basis for legislation establishing a coherent national development planning system, as well as a legislative mandate for the DPME. The White Paper was scheduled for completion during the 2026–27 financial year, followed by the development of a Bill during the 2027–28 financial year.

== Mandate ==
The DPME's mandate includes:

- Supporting the National Planning Commission
- Facilitating the implementation of the National Development Plan through medium-term plans and delivery agreements
- Coordinating the Medium-Term Development Plan and monitoring its implementation
- Ensuring alignment between government departments' strategic and annual plans, budgets and national priorities
- Monitoring the performance of national and provincial departments and municipalities
- Monitoring frontline service delivery
- Developing and implementing the national evaluation plan

The department does not have an explicit statutory mandate. Instead, its mandate is derived from the Constitution, Presidential Proclamation No. 47 of 2014, the Public Finance Management Act, and the Policy Framework on Integrated Planning.

The DPME's functions are organized into programs covering administration; national planning coordination; sector planning and monitoring; public sector monitoring and capacity development; and evidence and knowledge systems. These functions include coordinating government-wide planning, monitoring the implementation of government priorities, supporting interventions to address implementation failures, developing the national evaluation system, and generating and coordinating evidence for government decision-making.

== Structure ==
The department is led by the Minister of Planning, Monitoring and Evaluation, who is supported by a Deputy Minister. The administrative head of the department is the Director General, who is supported by Deputy Directors General responsible for the department's principal functional areas.

The department's administrative functions are managed through the Office of the Director General, the Office of the Chief Financial Officer, the Chief Information Officer, human resources management, and other corporate services. Its monitoring functions include sector monitoring; public sector monitoring; and capacity development, while its evidence and knowledge functions support data analysis; research; and the use of evidence in planning, monitoring, and evaluation.
