= Fezeka Mbiko =

South African politician

Fezeka Mbiko MP

Member of the National Assembly of South Africa
- Incumbent
- Assumed office 17 October 2024
- Preceded by: Renaldo Gouws

Member of the Eastern Cape Provincial Legislature
- In office 19 February 2019 – 7 May 2019
- Preceded by: Celeste Barker

Personal details
- Born: 1958 or 1959 (age 67–68) Gwadana, Dutywa, Cape Province, South Africa
- Party: Democratic Alliance
- Profession: Politician

Fezeka Mbiko (born 1958 or 1959) is a South African politician who has been a Member of the National Assembly of South Africa since October 2024. A member of the Democratic Alliance, she previously served in the Eastern Cape Provincial Legislature for three months from February 2019 until May 2019.

== Early life and background ==
Mbiko was born in Gwadana outside Dutywa in the Cape Province. She worked for the Eastern Cape Development Corporation for a total of 33 years before becoming involved in politics.

Mbiko is a graduate of the Thabo Mbeki African Leadership Institute.

== Political career ==
Mbiko served one term as a Democratic Alliance councillor in Dutywa from 2011 until 2016.

On 19 February 2019, Mbiko was sworn in as a DA representative in the Eastern Cape Provincial Legislature. She filled the casual vacancy created after Celeste Barker was medically boarded by the party. Mbiko served until the general election three months later.

Mbiko re-entered frontline politics in October 2024 when she was sworn in as a DA Member of the National Assembly, succeeding Renaldo Gouws, whose party membership had been terminated. She was appointed constituency leader of the party's Phesheya Kwenciba constituency, which includes the towns of Butterworth, Elliotdale, Willowvale, Dutywa, Qumrha, Chintsa and Kei Mouth.
