= Andile Lungisa =

South African politician (born 1978)

Deputy President of the African National Congress Youth League
- In office April 2008 – June 2011
- President: Julius Malema
- Preceded by: Rubben Mohlaloga
- Succeeded by: Ronald Lamola

Chairperson of the National Youth Development Agency
- In office April 2009 – April 2013
- Deputy: Yeshen Pillay
- Preceded by: Agency established
- Succeeded by: Yeshen Pillay

Member of the National Executive Committee of the African National Congress
- Incumbent
- Assumed office 2022

Personal details
- Born: Andile Weah Lungisa; 21 December 1978 (age 47) Tsomo, Cape Province; South Africa
- Party: African National Congress
- Spouse: Ursula Sali

Andile Weah Lungisa (born 21 December 1978) is a South African politician from the Eastern Cape. He has been a member of the National Executive Committee of the African National Congress (ANC) since December 2022. He rose to prominence as the deputy president of the ANC Youth League between April 2008 and June 2011. He is also the former chairperson of the National Youth Development Agency (NYDA) and the former president of the Pan-African Youth Union.

Lungisa was elected as a local councillor in the Nelson Mandela Bay Metropolitan Municipality in the August 2016 local elections, and he served as a Member of the Mayoral Committee (MMC) in the municipality between August 2018 and August 2020. Between September and December 2020, he was imprisoned on a criminal charges after he assaulted an opposition politician during a heated council meeting. Though he was released on parole shortly into his two-year prison sentence, his criminal conviction led to an 18-month suspension from the ANC.

== Early life and activism ==
Lungisa was born on 21 December 1978 in Tsomo in the former Cape Province, now the Eastern Cape. Although he uses the surname Lungisa, he has said that his parents' surnames were Somdyala and Ntlemeza. His maternal grandparents were AbaThembu supporters of the African National Congress (ANC) and of King Sabata Dalindyebo; his paternal grandparents had lived in Lesotho since 1952 and his father was born there.

He became active in politics as a teenager, joining the South African Students Congress (SASCO) at the age of 14 and later becoming chairperson of SASCO's regional branch in Port Elizabeth and Grahamstown. In 1998, he was a founding member of the City Central branch of the ANC Youth League (ANCYL) in the western suburbs of Port Elizabeth, and he was elected to the branch's inaugural executive committee. Three years later he was elected as deputy chairperson of the ANCYL's regional branch in Nelson Mandela Bay. He later joined the regional executive committee of the mainstream ANC branch in Nelson Mandela Bay. In parallel with his political activism, he pursued a career as a poet and playwright.

== Career in youth politics ==
=== ANCYL deputy presidency: 2008–2011 ===
At the ANCYL's chaotic 23rd National Conference in Bloemfontein in April 2008, Lungisa was elected as deputy president of the league. He stood for the position on a slate aligned to the winning presidential candidate, Julius Malema. His election brought him national political prominence. It was followed in 2009 by his appointment as the inaugural chairperson of the National Youth Development Agency (NYDA) and by his appointment to President Jacob Zuma's Broad Based Black Economic Empowerment Council. In 2009 and 2010, he was one of the Mail & Guardian's 200 Young South Africans.

By March 2010, Lungisa was rumored to be planning to challenge Malema for the ANCYL presidency at the league's next elective conference. In subsequent months the challenge coalesced into a nascent campaign with support concentrated in the Eastern Cape, the Congress of South African Trade Unions, and the South African Communist Party's Young Communist League; Lungisa's backers, including Lehlogonolo Masoga and Buti Manamela, were associated with opposition to Malema's bid to have Fikile Mbalula replace Gwede Mantashe as ANC secretary-general. The split between Lungisa and Malema played out at the regional level in a series of highly contested provincial elective conferences in the ANCYL.

However, famously intolerant of opposition, Malema struck back at the ANCYL's midterm national general council, held in August 2010 at Gallagher Estate; his allies in the Eastern Cape branch of the ANCYL tabled a resolution calling for a vote on a no-confidence motion in Lungisa's leadership. Though much of the proceedings were closed to the press, Lungisa reportedly escaped the motion of no confidence by disowning the anti-Malema campaign and apologising. In a session attended by journalists, Malema told the delegates to, "Accept the deputy president’s apology... We must all love one another." The saga was viewed as a political humiliation for Lungisa.

In January 2011, as the ANCYL elective conference approached, Lungisa withdrew from contention for the presidency, reportedly throwing his support behind Malema's other rival, Lebogang Maile. However, in May, Lungisa also disowned Maile's campaign and endorsed Malema's bid for re-election, commending his leadership and claiming that he had never intended to unseat him. The following month, Lungisa's term as deputy president ended when the elective conference, re-electing Malema, also elected Ronald Lamola as the new ANCYL deputy president. Lungisa did not stand for re-election to a top leadership position, but he was elected as an ordinary member of the ANCYL's National Executive Committee.

=== NYDA chairmanship: 2009–2013 ===
Lungisa was the chairperson of NYDA for one term between April 2009 and April 2013. After he left the ANCYL leadership in 2011, he said that he intended to focus on his role as chairman of NYDA, but the following year, he was omitted from the parliamentary shortlist of candidates for the next NYDA board. On 1 April 2013, Yershen Pillay, his former deputy on the board, succeeded him as NYDA chairperson.

In October 2013, Lungisa and three others appeared before the Johannesburg Specialised Commercial Crime Court over allegations of fraud and money-laundering relating to a R2.5 million paid by the Department of Arts and Culture for the 'Nelson Mandela Sports Day concert', popularly derided as the "kissing festival". They allegedly promised that US singer R Kelly would perform at the concert, but he did not. Later it was discovered that R Kelly's management had been unaware of the event. Their case was withdrawn in October 2016.

=== PYU presidency: 2011–2013 ===
Lungisa was the deputy president of the African Union's Pan-African Youth Union (PYU) between 2008 and 2011, and on 5 December 2011 he was elected as its president during the third PYU congress in Khartoum, Sudan. Although he was elected for a three-year term, he completed only two years; from December 2013, he was succeeded by Pillay, who had also succeeded him at NYDA.

=== Mangaung conference: 2012 ===
In December 2012, Lungisa attended the mainstream ANC's 53rd National Conference in Mangaung, where he was nominated to stand for election to the party's National Executive Committee. However, along with many other candidates viewed as hostile to incumbent ANC president Jacob Zuma, he failed to gain election to the committee. Instead, in July 2013, he was elected to the Provincial Executive Committee of the ANC's Eastern Cape branch. Later that year he expressed continued interest in contesting the ANCYL presidency.

== Career in Nelson Mandela Bay ==
In the May 2014 general election, Lungisa stood as a candidate for election to the National Assembly of South Africa, the lower branch of the South African Parliament. However, listed 147th on the ANC's national party list, he failed to gain election to a seat. Two years later, he stood for election as a local councillor in the Nelson Mandela Bay Metropolitan Municipality in Port Elizabeth, and he won an ANC council seat in the August 2016 local elections. In August 2018, he was additionally appointed as Member of the Mayoral Committee (MMC) for Infrastructure and Engineering.

=== ANC chairmanship: 2017 ===
While serving as an ordinary councillor, he was elected as the regional chairperson of the ANC in the Nelson Mandela region in 2017 but resigned shortly afterwards when the national executive committee (NEC) found that he broke the ANC Constitution for contesting on a regional level while serving as provincial executive committee (PEC) member.

In March 2017, Lungisa was asked to resign as Nelson Mandela ANC region chairperson having been in the position for less than a week. In terms of ANC Constitution, Lungisa was supposed to resign first as Eastern Cape ANC provincial executive committee (PEC) member before contesting on a lower level.

=== Festival of chairs: 2017 ===
Later in 2017, Lungisa launched a bid for a leadership position in the Eastern Cape ANC, joining provincial chairperson Phumulo Masualle's slate ahead of the provincial party's upcoming elective conference. When the provincial conference opened in October 2017, a plenary session devolved into violence in an incident later popularly known as the "festival of chairs". By the end of the brawl, Lungisa, Masualle, and most of their supporters had left or been removed from the conference, and Lungisa was not available to formally accept or decline his nomination to stand for the position of provincial secretary; he thus received only one vote in the election, and the position of provincial secretary went to Lulama Ngcukayitobi. Lungisa became an outspoken critic of Oscar Mabuyane, who was elected to replace Masualle as provincial chairperson at the conference.

=== Assault trial and conviction: 2018–2020 ===
In April 2018, Lungisa was found guilty of assault with the intent to cause grievous bodily harm for hitting DA councillor Rano Kayser over the head with a glass water jug during a heated council meeting in October 2016. The incident was caught on camera by fellow councillor Renaldo Gouws and Lungisa was sentenced to an effective 2 years. He said he acted in self-defense but Judge Morne Cannon of the Port Elizabeth Magistrates Court, said Lungisa changed his versions throughout the trial and his evidence could not be trusted.

Lungisa served 16 days of his sentence before gaining release on R10,000 bail in May 2018, pending his appeal in the Supreme Court of Appeal. On 17 September 2020, after the appeal failed, he returned to North End Prison in Port Elizabeth to serve the rest of his sentence. The following week, he was granted renewed bail in the amount of R10,000 pending a bid for leave to appeal in the Constitutional Court, but he elected to remain in prison.

Through much of this saga, Lungisa resisted a series of instructions from the ANC to step aside from his positions in the Nelson Mandela Bay municipality. He ultimately resigned from his MMC position in August 2020, but he reportedly remained an ordinary councillor when he entered prison the following month.

Lungisa's two-year prison sentence was halved by the special remission of sentences announced by President Cyril Ramaphosa during the COVID-19 pandemic, and he received parole on the remainder of his sentence because he was a first-time offender. He was released on parole on 1 December 2020 after serving two-and-a-half months in prison. His first political act upon his release from prison was to verbally attack Mabuyane and President Ramaphosa, maintaining that his incarceration as a "political prisoner" had been politically motivated.

== National political career ==
=== Lockdown violation charges: 2021–2022 ===
Between July 2021 and October 2022, Andile Lungisa faced criminal charges for allegedly contravening COVID-19 lockdown regulations by holding a political gathering during the July 2021 civil unrest. He said the charges were "nonsense". He first appeared in the Motherwell Magistrate's Court on 23 July 2021, but trial was delayed after he failed to attend a court hearing in October that year. The charges were ultimately withdrawn in October 2022.

=== ANC suspension proceedings: 2021–2022 ===
In the months after his release, Lungisa was subject to disciplinary proceedings inside the Eastern Cape ANC for contravening party rules of conduct in connection with his criminal conviction. In July 2021, the Eastern Cape ANC announced that it had suspended Lungisa's party membership for 18 months. Lungisa initially succeeded in appealing that decision in September 2021.

While further proceedings were pending, Lungisa attended the Eastern Cape ANC's elective conference in May 2022. Opposing Mabuyane's re-election bid, he stood for election as treasurer-general on a slate of candidates aligned to Babalo Madikizela, who ran against Mabuyane for the chairmanship. However, Mabuyane and his allies won in all the top leadership positions; Lungisa lost the treasury to Zolile Williams, who received 799 votes to his 673. Lungisa was nonetheless reelected to the Provincial Executive Committee as an ordinary member.

However, the suspension of his ANC membership was reinstated in November 2022, upheld by the ANC's National Executive Committee. Lungisa unsuccessfully challenged the suspension in court.

=== National Executive Committee: 2022–present ===
In mid-2022, Lungisa launched a campaign to ascend to the ANC's national leadership as the party's national treasurer-general. At the party's 55th National Conference in December 2022, he was nominated from the floor of the conference to stand for election as treasurer-general, but he was immediately disqualified because of his recently reinstated suspension. However, the conference nonetheless elected Lungisa to a five-year term on the party's National Executive Committee; by popularity, he was ranked eleventh of the 80 candidates elected, receiving 1,758 votes across the 4,029 ballots cast in total.

Ahead of the May 2024 general election, Lungisa strongly opposed proposals to engage in coalition negotiations with the opposition DA, saying that, "The day people decide to work with the DA is the day when I will retire and go home to milk my father’s cattle." The ANC lost its national majority in that election and President Ramaphosa formed a so-called government of national unity that included the DA, to Lungisa's contempt; however, Lungisa told the Star that he planned to "fight inside the movement" rather than defect to another party.

== Personal life ==
Lungisa is married and has seven children. His wife, Ursula Sali, was one of the co-accused in his 2014 fraud trial.
