= Fébé Potgieter-Gqubule =

South African politician

Fébé Potgieter-Gqubule is an activist and feminist from Eastern Cape, South Africa. She was active in the South African liberation struggles since the early 1980s as a high school student, has held various positions in the student and youth movement, served on boards of public entities and in her political party, the African National Congress (ANC).

Formerly a student anti-apartheid in the South African Youth Congress, Potgieter-Gqubule attained political prominence as Secretary-General of the ANC Youth League in the 1990s. She worked full-time in managerial positions at Luthuli House, the ANC's headquarters, from 1998 to 2004 and again from 2018 to present. Other positions included South African Ambassador to Poland (2005-2009); the Deputy Chairperson of the South African Broadcasting Corporation (2017-2018); and Strategic advisor to Commission Dr Nkosazana Dlamini Zuma and AU Commission Deputy Chief of Staff of the AU Commission (2012-2017).

== Early life and education ==
Potgieter-Gqubule was born in Humansdorp, a small town in what is now the Eastern Cape province of South Africa. She has five siblings. She was in grade three at Kruisfontein Primary School during the Soweto uprising of 1976 and matriculated in another Humansdorp school during the 1980s, in a period marked by anti-apartheid school boycotts. She was head girl at her high school and was involved in founding a student representative council. While at the University of the Western Cape, she became further involved in student politics, especially through the South African Youth Congress. She has identified Cheryl Carolus of the United Democratic Front and Nkosazana Dlamini-Zuma of the African National Congress (ANC) as among her role models in political leadership.

Potigeter-Gqubule has a Master's degree from the University of the Witwatersrand, with her research focused on youth labour market policy and institutions in Gauteng,.

== Post-apartheid career ==
In 1994, Potgieter-Gqubule was elected as Deputy Secretary-General of the ANC Youth League (ANCYL), deputising Mpho Lekgoro in a leadership corps headed by ANCYL President Lulu Johnson. At the next league elective conference in 1996, she was elected as the first female Secretary-General of the ANCYL, under President Malusi Gigaba.

She subsequently worked full-time for the ANC between 1998 and 2004, serving at the party's headquarters at Luthuli House in Johannesburg as the national coordinator of the National Executive Committee (NEC) of the mainstream ANC. She was South African ambassador to Poland under President Thabo Mbeki from 2005 to 2009.

She served variously as chairperson of the board of the Lejweleputswa Development Agency, a local development agency in Lejweleputswa, Free State; as a member of the founding board of governors of the Mapungubwe Institute for Strategic Reflection, a think tank (2010–2013); and as a member of the council of the Mangosuthu University of Technology (2012–2014). In March 2010, she was appointed Deputy Chairperson of the board of the State Information Technology Agency (SITA), a state-owned enterprise. She became acting chairperson at the end of August 2011, following the expiry of the term of Chairperson Zodwa Manase, and remained in that capacity until November 2012, when she and the rest of the board stepped down in order to recuse themselves fully while the Special Investigating Unit concluded an investigation into allegations of procurement irregularities at SITA.

In October 2012, she moved to Addis Ababa, Ethiopia, when she was appointed Advisor for Strategy and Planning to the Chairperson of the African Union (AU) Commission, an office held at that time by Nkosazana Dlamini-Zuma, a South African. In April 2015, Dlamini-Zuma appointed Potgieter-Gqubule as the Deputy Chief of Staff in her office when the incumbent, Jennifer Chiriga, was promoted to Chief of Staff. Potgieter-Gqubule left the AU Commission in March 2017, shortly after Dlamini-Zuma's own departure.

The same month, back in South Africa, she was appointed as a member of the interim board of the South African Broadcasting Corporation (SABC). In October that year, President Jacob Zuma appointed her deputy chairperson on the permanent board, under Chairperson Bongumusa Makhathini. Opposition parties, especially the Democratic Alliance, expressed concern about her appointment, given what they perceived as her close political links to the ANC and to Dlamini-Zuma in particular. At that time the Business Day described her as a "close ally" of Dlamini-Zuma, and she was an adviser on Dlamini-Zuma's campaign to become ANC President at the party's 54th National Conference in December 2017.

In March 2018, Potgieter-Gqubule resigned from the SABC board to take up the position of General Manager at the ANC ahead of its campaign in the 2019 general election. The job was based out of the ANC's headquarters at Luthuli House and was incompatible with the SABC directorship because of a potential conflict of interest. She held the managerial position during a period in which the ANC experienced substantial financial difficulties, and she led an internal party process to restructure and "resize" the party machinery, including through staff retrenchment. As of 2022, she was also a member of the board of the ANC's political education school, the O. R. Tambo School of Leadership.

== ANC National Executive Committee ==
At the ANC's 52nd National Conference in December 2007, Potgieter-Gqubule was elected to the top executive organ of the ANC, the NEC. Of the 80 candidates elected, she was ranked 17th by number of votes received. She declined a nomination to stand for re-election to the ANC NEC at the party's 53rd National Conference in December 2012, although she was considered a favourite for re-election.

Ahead of the party's 54th National Conference, Potgieter-Gqubule was herself nominated for one of the party's top leadership positions, the post of Deputy Secretary-General; the Sunday Times identified her candidacy as part of an informal slate aligned not to Dlamini-Zuma but to Baleka Mbete, who was contesting with Dlamini-Zuma for the presidency. It was also reported that Potgieter-Gqubule had been mentioned as a leadership candidate in meetings of a lobby group which sought to install "young" persons (under 60) in top party offices. However, Potgieter-Gqubule declined the nomination for Deputy Secretary-General or any other positions on the NEC,

In the run-up to the ANC's 55th National Conference in December 2022, Potgieter-Gqubule was again touted as a possible candidate for the Deputy Secretary-General position, this time as part of a slate aligned to incumbent ANC President Cyril Ramaphosa. Although endorsed by the Provincial Executive Committee of the Northern Cape ANC for the Secretary-General position, she was formally nominated for the Deputy Secretary-General position by local party branches. Though she received fewer nominations than the other candidate, Nomvula Mokonyane, her candidacy received the support of the national leadership of the ANC Women's League despite Mokonyane's own status as a league stalwart. Potgieter-Gqubule was expected to run on a slate aligned to Ramaphosa but, when the elective conference began, it was announced that she had declined the Deputy Secretary-General nomination in written communications with the ANC Electoral Committee, according to the Mail & Guardian. Potgieter-Gqubule did stand for election as additional member of the ANC NEC, and after her election, was appointed as ANC Head of Policy and Research, a position she occupies since 2023.
