= Nalumango =

Nalumango is a surname. Notable people with the surname include:

- Mutale Nalumango (born 1955), Zambian educator and politician
- Ronalda Nalumango (born 1978), South African politician
