= Planning Commission =

Planning commissions are governmental bodies that make decisions about either Land-use planning or Economic planning, depending on the jurisdiction.

Land-use commissions:

- Planning committee, a local planning authority in the United Kingdom
- Planning and Zoning Commission, a local government planning body in the United States

Economic commissions:

- Gosplan, Soviet economic planning commission
- Bangladesh Planning Commission, financial and public policy development institution of the Government of Bangladesh
- Planning Commission (India), economic institution of India that formulated its five-year plans (abolished 2016, see NITI Aayog)
- Planning Commission (Pakistan), similar institution in Pakistan that formulates its five-year plans

== See also ==
- National Planning Commission (disambiguation)
- State Planning Commission (disambiguation)
