= Land and Agricultural Development Bank of South Africa =

Land and Agricultural Bank of South Africa
- Type: Parastatal
- Industry: Finance
- Founded: 1912
- Headquarters: Centurion, South Africa
- Key people: NR Nkosi (Chairperson); Themba Rikhotso (CEO); Adv B Raseroka (Company Secretary)
- Products: Loans
- Owner: Government of South Africa
- Website: Homepage

Land and Development Bank of South Africa (LADBSA) is a government-owned development bank in the Republic of South Africa. The bank was established as a development finance institution in 1912 by the Government of South Africa. The main objective of LADBSA is to promote and finance development in the agricultural sector of the economy of the country.

== See also ==
- List of banks in South Africa
- Economy of South Africa
- List of banks in Africa
- Pretoria
