= Alexkor Ltd v Richtersveld Community =

South African legal case

- Court: Constitutional Court of South Africa
- Full case name: Alexkor Ltd and Another v Richtersveld Community and Others
- Decided: 14 October 2003

Alexkor v Richtersveld Community, decided by the Constitutional Court in 2001, is an important case in South African law, with a particular bearing on the law of property and the use of customary law.

The Richtersveld community brought a claim for the restoration of its ancestral land in terms of the Restitution of Land Rights Act, a statutory mechanism giving effect to the government's constitutionally-mandated land reform and restitution programme. The appellant in this case was the mining corporation Alexkor, which had an interest in the diamondiferous parts of the Richtersveld area. An important aspect of the case was the community's assertion that it used the land according to its indigenous customs, an assertion upheld in both the Supreme Court of Appeal (SCA) and the Constitutional Court, and on the basis whereof the land was returned to the community.

In defining and determining what is entailed by customary-law ownership of land, the SCA equated it with common-law ownership, while the Constitutional Court found that its content should be ascertained by studying the customs and uses of the community. It was thus decided that the Richtersveld community's claim to the land incorporated a claim to the minerals in the land, and that the community's entitlement to both the land and the minerals should be acknowledged and restored. Incorporated in this was the right of the community to claim compensation for past exploitation of the land by Alexkor and the state. The court's reasoning shows "how the redefinition of the sources of South African property law affects the protection offered to relationships with land."

== See also ==
- Property law
- Customary law
- South African property law
- Customary law in South Africa
- Aboriginal title
