= State Planning Commission =

State Planning Commission may refer to:

- Gosplan, ministry of Soviet Union
- State Planning Commission (China) (1952–1998), preceding the National Development and Reform Commission of the People's Republic of China
- State Planning Commission of North Korea, a cabinet-level organization within the North Korean government
- State Planning Commission (GDR), a central state authority of the GDR Council of Ministers for planning, coordinating and proportional development of all sectors of the economy

== See also ==
- Planning Commission (disambiguation)
- National Planning Commission (disambiguation)
