= Department of Women, Youth and Persons with Disabilities =

Department of the South African government

Government department overview
- Formed: June 14, 2019; 7 years ago (current form)
- Preceding Government department: Department of Women
- Jurisdiction: South Africa
- Headquarters: 36 Hamilton St, Arcadia, Pretoria, Gauteng, South Africa
- Government department executive: Sindisiwe Chikunga, Minister of Women, Youth and Persons with Disabilities
- Parent department: The Presidency
- Child Government department: National Youth Development Agency
- Website: dwypd.gov.za

The Department of Women, Youth and Persons with Disabilities (DWYPD) (formerly Department of Women) is a department of the Government of South Africa with the responsibility for women, youth and persons with disabilities. The department is led by the Minister of Women, Youth and Persons with Disabilities, Sindisiwe Chikunga

The DWYPD oversees critical entities such as the National Youth Development Agency (NYDA), established primarily to address challenges faced by the nation’s youth.

== History ==
The Department of Women, Children and People with Disabilities was established by former South African President Jacob Zuma in May 2009.

Between 2014 and 2019, the department was named the Department of Women, and located within the Office of the Presidency.

In June 2019, President Cyril Ramaphosa created the department in its current form. The youth function was transferred from the Department of Planning, Monitoring and Evaluation (DPME). The function of people with disabilities was transferred from the Department of Social Development. Thus, the new department had a broader mandate.

== Ministers ==
As of May 2019, the department's Minister is Maite Nkoana-Mashabane, a member of the ANC.

== Entities ==
- National Youth Development Agency
