= Rubben Mohlaloga =

South African politician

Member of the National Assembly
- In office 23 April 2004 – May 2009

Deputy President of the African National Congress Youth League
- In office April 2001 – April 2008
- President: Malusi Gigaba; Fikile Mbalula
- Preceded by: Joe Maswanganyi
- Succeeded by: Andile Lungisa

Personal details
- Born: Manyaba Rubben Mohlaloga; 8 August 1973 (age 53)
- Citizenship: South Africa
- Party: African National Congress
- Education: University of Africa; University of London

Manyaba Rubben Mohlaloga (born 8 August 1973) is a South African politician, civil servant, and convicted fraudster. He represented the African National Congress (ANC) in the National Assembly from 2004 to 2009 and was deputy president of the ANC Youth League from 2001 to 2008.

After leaving Parliament, Mohlaloga served as a councillor at the Independent Communications Authority of South Africa (ICASA) from 2013 to 2017. He was also briefly the chairperson of ICASA from 2017 to 2019. However, he was suspended from the latter office after being convicted of money laundering and fraud in early 2018. In February 2019, he was sentenced to serve twenty years' imprisonment.

== Early life and career ==
Born on 8 August 1973, Mohlaloga completed a Bachelor of Arts in communication and international politics at the University of Africa and a Master of Science in public policy and management at the University of London. From 1997 to 2000, he was a communications officer in the office of the Premier of Limpopo under Premier Ngoako Ramatlhodi; he later joined the administration of the Limpopo Provincial Legislature as a media liaison and public relations manager.

== Political career ==
=== ANC Youth League Deputy President: 2001–2008 ===
In April 2001, Mohlaloga was elected to succeed Joe Maswanganyi as deputy president of the ANC Youth League, serving under league president Malusi Gigaba. He was re-elected to a second term in August 2004, defeating a challenge from Tshilidzi Ratshitanga, and served until April 2008, when he aged out of the league and was succeeded by Andile Lungisa.

=== National Assembly: 2004–2009 ===
While serving in his ANC Youth League office, Mohlaloga was elected to an ANC seat in the National Assembly in the 2004 general election. He chaired Parliament's Portfolio Committee on Agriculture and Land Affairs from September 2006 to May 2009, and he also chaired the Ad Hoc Committee on the African Peer Review Mechanism. After a single term in his legislative seat, he left at the 2009 general election to serve as an advisor to Malusi Gigaba, who at the time was Deputy Minister of Home Affairs.

== Independent Communications Authority: 2013–2019 ==
From 2013 to 2017, Mohlaloga served on the board of ICASA as a councillor. Shortly after his term as an ordinary councillor expired in August 2017, President Jacob Zuma approved his appointment as chairperson of the ICASA board with effect from December. However, at the time of his appointment, he was facing charges of fraud and money laundering, and he was convicted in January 2018.

Because ICASA's rules stipulated that convicted fraudsters could not serve on the board, Parliament's Portfolio Committee on Communications recommended that Mohlaloga should be removed from the chair. However, the house of the National Assembly referred this recommendation back to the committee, arguing that he should not be removed permanently until he had concluded all legal appeals in his criminal conviction. Thus in May the committee recommended his suspension pending the finalisation of the criminal case. In March 2019, after Mohlaloga was sentenced to a lengthy prison term, the committee resolved that he should be removed from his ICASA office with immediate effect.

== Fraud and money laundering conviction ==
Mohlaloga was convicted of fraud and money laundering in January 2018. The charges arose from transactions completed in 2008 while Mohlaloga was chairperson of Parliament's Portfolio Committee on Agriculture. The court found that he and two co-accused – the former acting head of the Land Bank, Philemon Mohlahlane, and attorney Dinga Rammy Nkwashu – had defrauded the Land Bank of an amount of R6 million, which was transferred unlawfully from Agri-BEE (a grant programme for black farmers) to the defendants. Disallowed from applying for Agri-BEE grants themselves, Mohlaloga and Mohlahlane had other individuals – Mohlaloga's friends in the ANC Youth League – front the application. They used the money, among other things, to buy two BMWs for Mohlaloga. Mohlaloga conceded that he had received money from an Agri-BEE grant, but claimed that it was a loan.

In February 2019, a year after his initial conviction, Mohlaloga's sentence was handed down: the Pretoria Special Commercial Crimes Court sentenced him to 20 years in prison. However, he and his co-accused were also granted leave to appeal the sentencing, and he was released on R70,000 bail. In January 2023, the Gauteng High Court dismissed the appeals against Mohlaloga's conviction and sentence.
