= Minister of Planning, Monitoring and Evaluation =

- Flag of South Africa

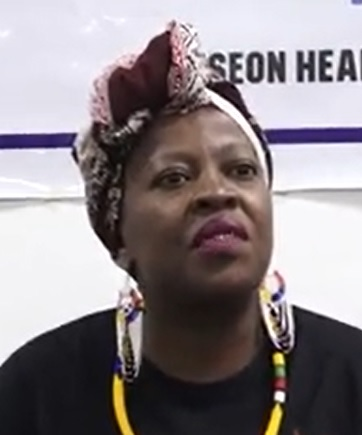
- Incumbent; Maropene Ramokgopa since 7 March 2023
- Department of Planning, Monitoring and Evaluation
- Style: The Honourable
- Appointer: President of South Africa
- Deputy: Seiso Mohai

The minister of planning, monitoring and evaluation is the minister in the Cabinet of South Africa with political responsibility for the Department of Planning, Monitoring and Evaluation. In recent years the minister is also chairperson of the National Planning Commission.

Before June 2024, the officeholder was a minister in the presidency, known as the minister in the presidency for planning, monitoring and evaluation and before that as the minister in the presidency for monitoring, evaluation and administration. Since June 2024, the ministry is no longer located in the presidency.

The incumbent minister is Maropene Ramokgopa of the African National Congress. Before her, the office was held by Nkosazana Dlamini-Zuma from 2018 to 2019 and by Collins Chabane from 2009 to 2014. In other years, no dedicated minister was appointed, and the relevant functions were carried out by another minister in the presidency.

== History ==
Announcing his first cabinet on 10 May 2009, President Jacob Zuma announced the appointment of a new minister in the presidency for monitoring, evaluation and administration. From 31 October 2010, the minister, Collins Chabane, was assisted by a deputy minister. Chabane's main task was to establish an institutional infrastructure for national monitoring and evaluation of government performance. In this vein, the Department of Planning, Monitoring and Evaluation (DPME; formerly called the Department of Performance Monitoring and Evaluation) was established in 2010 and delivered its first budget vote in June 2011.

In Zuma's second cabinet between 2014 and 2018, a specialised planning minister was not appointed; instead, political leadership of DPME fell within the broad remit of the minister in the presidency without portfolio. However, announcing his first cabinet on 26 February 2018, Zuma's successor, President Cyril Ramaphosa, appointed Nkosazana Dlamini-Zuma as minister in the presidency for planning, monitoring and evaluation. The new minister, Nkosazana Dlamini-Zuma, was both the political head of DPME and the chairperson of the National Planning Commission; in both capacities she oversaw the implementation of South Africa's National Development Plan.

After the 2019 general election, the position again became vacant as another Ministry in the Presidency carried out the relevant functions. However, in a reshuffle on 6 March 2023, President Cyril Ramaphosa announced the re-establishment of the Ministry in the Presidency for Planning, Monitoring and Evaluation, a move which he said was intended "to focus greater attention on the performance of government." Maropene Ramokgopa was appointed as minister. Like Dlamini-Zuma, as minister she was the political head of DPME and the chairperson of the National Planning Commission. Unlike Dlamini-Zuma, she was given a deputy minister.

Announcing his third cabinet on 30 June 2024, Ramaphosa re-appointed Ramokgopa as minister for planning, monitoring and evaluation, alongside Deputy Minister Seiso Mohai; in the new cabinet, the portfolio was no longer located in the presidency.

== List of ministers ==
List of ministers responsible for monitoring and evaluation, 2009–present
Portfolio	Minister	Term		Party	President
Minister in the Presidency for Monitoring, Evaluation and Administration	Collins Chabane	2009	2014	ANC	Jacob Zuma
Minister in the Presidency for Planning, Monitoring and Evaluation	Nkosazana Dlamini-Zuma	2018	2019	ANC	Cyril Ramaphosa
Minister in the Presidency for Planning, Monitoring and Evaluation	Maropene Ramokgopa	2023	2024	ANC	Cyril Ramaphosa
Minister of Planning, Monitoring and Evaluation	Maropene Ramokgopa	2024	–	ANC	Cyril Ramaphosa
