= Kgotso Khumalo =

South African politician

Member of the National Assembly
- In office 23 April 2004 – June 2009
- Constituency: North West

Personal details
- Citizenship: South Africa
- Party: African National Congress

Kgotso Moses Khumalo is a South African politician who represented the African National Congress (ANC) in the National Assembly from 2004 to 2009. He was the inaugural Mayor of JB Marks Local Municipality in the North West from 2016 until May 2021, when he stepped aside while facing fraud and theft charges.

== Early life and activism ==
Khumalo was active in anti-apartheid youth politics during the 1980s, including through the Congress of South African Students and the Ikageng and Johannesburg Youth Congresses, and he was detained for his activism in 1986. He later joined the ANC Youth League and was elected provincial secretary of the league's North West branch.

== Parliament: 2004–2009 ==
In the 2004 general election, Khumalo was elected to an ANC seat in the National Assembly, representing the North West constituency. He served as a party whip in the Portfolio Committee on Communications and in February 2008 was appointed to succeed Mpho Lekgoro as spokesperson for the ANC's parliamentary caucus.

== JB Marks Mayor: 2016–2021 ==
By late 2015, Khumalo was in office as Mayor of Tlokwe Local Municipality in the North West. Pursuant to the 2016 local elections, he was elected as Mayor of JB Marks Local Municipality (initially referred to as NW405), which was formed in a controversial merger of the Tlokwe and Ventersdorp municipalities. The ANC Youth League in the region called for his resignation as early as March 2017, and he faced sizeable service-delivery protests in August 2018, with hundreds of residents marching to demand his resignation and that of his senior management team, alleging that they were responsible for underperformance and even embezzlement of funds.

In October 2020, the Hawks arrested Khumalo and a senior official on fraud and theft charges. They were accused of having misappropriated about R5 million in municipal funds, including a large contribution to the funeral of Ndleleni Duma in 2018, apparently by falsifying invoices. On the instructions of the ANC, Khumalo stepped aside from the mayoral office on 12 May 2021; he was succeeded by Mapule Mataboge in July.

== Personal life ==
Khumalo is married to Malebitso Khumalo, with whom he has four children. His eldest child and only son, Mike Maimane, was murdered in February 2017. He was hospitalised with COVID-19-related illness in July 2020.
