= 55th National Conference of the African National Congress =

Elective meeting in South Africa, 2022

- 16–20 December 2022

4,426 party delegates 50% + 1 votes needed to win
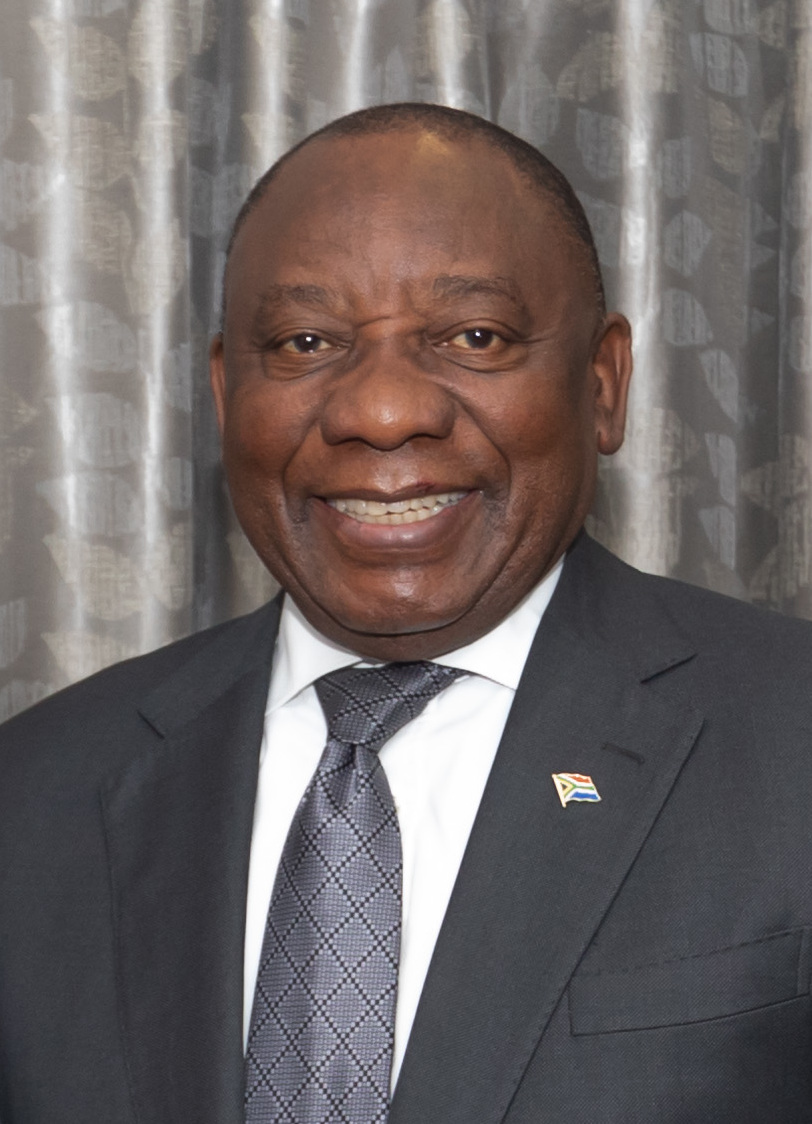

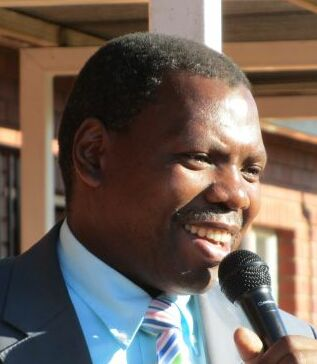
Candidate	Cyril Ramaphosa	Zweli Mkhize
Delegate vote	2,476	1,897
Percentage	56.62%	43.38%
President before election
Cyril Ramaphosa
Elected President
Cyril Ramaphosa

The 55th National Conference of the African National Congress (ANC) was a party conference of the African National Congress, a political party in South Africa, that took place from 16 to 20 December 2022, at the Johannesburg Expo Centre in Nasrec, Gauteng. Attended by 4,426 voting delegates, the conference elected the party's 87-member National Executive Committee, including the top officials – for the first time referred to as the "Top Seven," rather than the "Top Six," following an amendment to the party's constitution to introduce a second deputy secretary-general position. Delegates also adopted resolutions on governance and policy, informed by the outcomes of the ANC's 6th National Policy Conference held in July 2022.

At the conference, Cyril Ramaphosa, the incumbent President of South Africa, was re-elected as ANC president, defeating a challenge from Zweli Mkhize. He thereby became the party's presumptive presidential candidate at the next national general election in 2024. Paul Mashatile was elected his deputy.

== Conference opening ==
The theme of the conference was "Defend and advance the gains of freedom: unity through renewal". The conference venue, when it opened on 16 December, was exempted from the load-shedding affecting most residential areas of the country. The request for Nasrec to be excluded from load-shedding was made by SAPS' National Joint Operational and Intelligence Structure in order to assist security operations in the area during the conference. Early proceedings of the conference were nonetheless significantly delayed and outgoing ANC president Cyril Ramaphosa did not begin delivering his political report to the conference until late afternoon, seven hours after initially scheduled. His speech was then disrupted by the late entrance of former ANC president Jacob Zuma and by a small group of hecklers, primarily from the party's KwaZulu-Natal branches, who sang and jeered loudly until an intervention by KwaZulu-Natal Provincial Chairperson Siboniso Duma.

Outgoing ANC deputy president David Mabuza delivered the party's organisational report, traditionally delivered by the secretary-general, because the incumbent secretary-general, Ace Magashule, was suspended from the party. Mabuza reported that the ANC's membership had dropped significantly since the last party conference, from 989,736 members in good standing in December 2017 to 661,489 at the time of his report.

== Electoral process ==
Ahead of the conference, rules for the election of the National Executive Committee (NEC) and Top Six were devised by a committee chaired by Kgalema Motlanthe, a former President of South Africa and a former deputy president of the ANC. The rules, published in August 2022, effected several significant changes to the ANC's internal election procedures, First, they disqualified from top leadership positions any ANC members who had been charged with or found guilty of "unethical or immoral conduct, or any serious crime, or corruption". For example, on these grounds ANC Women's League leader Bathabile Dlamini was disqualified from standing for re-election to the NEC. The new rules also prohibited NEC candidates from campaigning as an organised slate and required all campaigns to submit full financial records for inspection by the party's internal Electoral Committee.

The Electoral Committee also announced that the election of the Top Six officials – which previously occurred in a single poll, with one ballot paper – would proceed in two stages in 2022: the president, secretary-general, national chairperson, and treasurer-general would be elected in the first ballot; and the deputy president and deputy secretary-general would be elected in the second, after the results of the first ballot have been announced. The revised procedure was expected to complicate the system of slate campaigning that prevailed in internal ANC elections, since unsuccessful candidates in the first ballot would be able to stand in the second ballot; however, most centrally, the committee framed the procedure as a means of allowing voters to balance the Top Six for representativity (in terms of age and ethnic or regional blocs) and gender parity. Once the conference began, however, this proposal was abandoned in favour of the traditional single ballot. Delegates at the conference also amended the party constitution to change the composition of the Top Six: a second deputy secretary-general position was created, resulting in a new "Top Seven".

As before, the NEC elections were subject to a gender quota – requiring 40 of its 80 members to be women.

== Leadership campaigns ==
=== Ramaphosa campaign ===
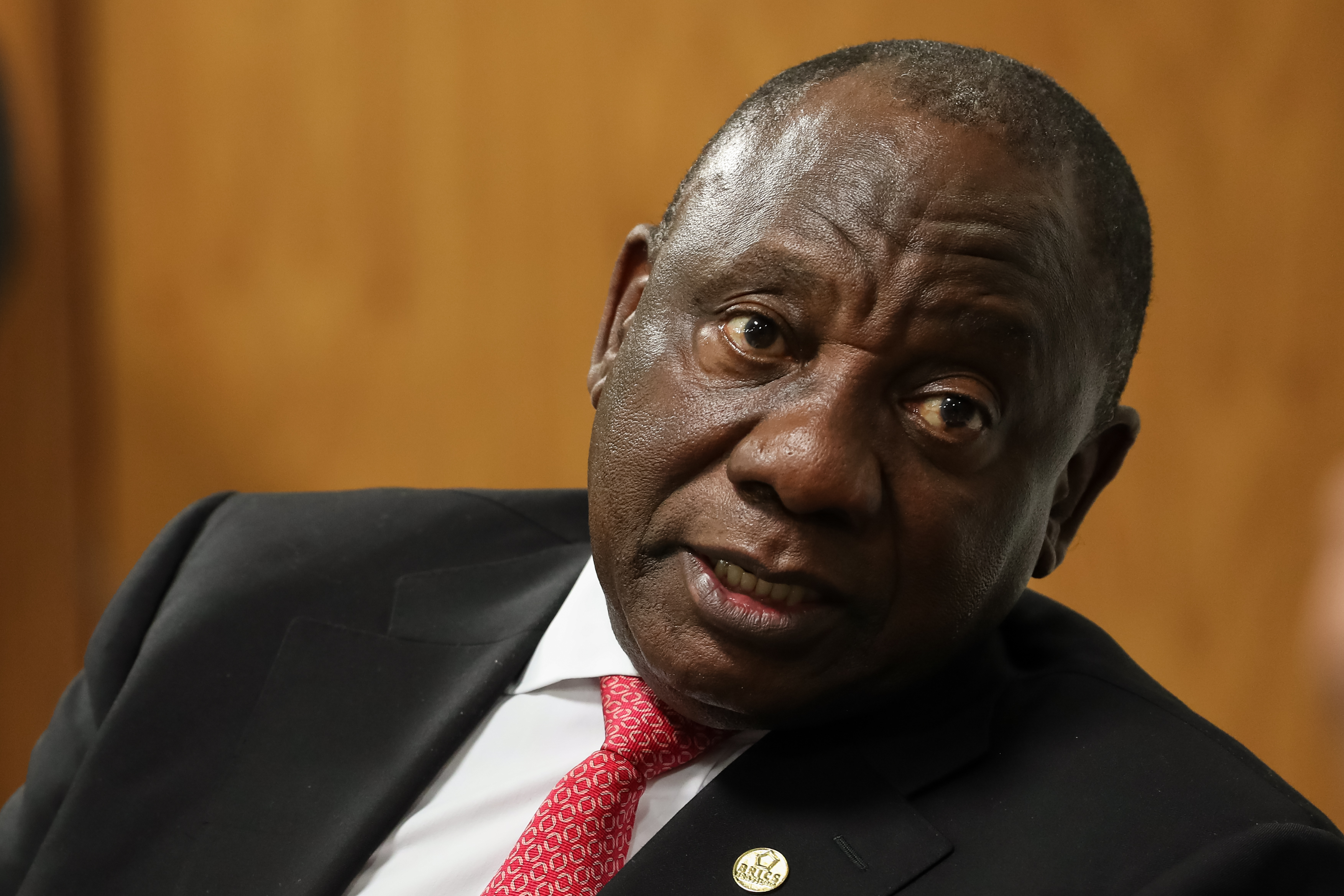
President Cyril Ramaphosa's bid for re-election was endorsed by leaders in six of the ANC's nine provinces.

Ramaphosa's bid for re-election as ANC president was labelled the CR22 campaign and involved a "formidable" social media campaign under the banner of #Renewal22. The campaign identified its four priorities as social and economic transformation; "clean, accountable and effective" leadership; public safety; and the completion of Ramaphosa's project of "renewing" the ANC internally. By the beginning of November 2022, Ramaphosa's bid for re-election was endorsed by the provincial leadership of the ANC in six of nine provinces: the Northern Cape, the Eastern Cape, Limpopo, Mpumalanga, North West, and Gauteng.

In October, a slate of Top Six candidates circulated, reportedly based on consultations between Ramaphosa's supporters in the incumbent NEC; for example, Derek Hanekom, who is closely involved in the CR22 campaign, endorsed the slate on Twitter. The slate proposed Ramaphosa as ANC president, Senzo Mchunu as his deputy, incumbent Gwede Mantashe as party chairperson, Fikile Mbalula as secretary-general, Febe Potgieter as deputy secretary-general, and Gwen Ramokgopa as treasurer-general.

=== Other contenders ===
Minister of Tourism Lindiwe Sisulu, former Minister of Health Zweli Mkhize, and Minister of Cooperative Governance and Traditional Affairs Nkosazana Dlamini-Zuma all sought to garner public support for their presidential bids, as did the incumbent ANC deputy president, national Deputy President David Mabuza. Mkhize and Dlamini-Zuma were viewed as contesting with each other for popularity in the province of KwaZulu-Natal, which was the ANC's largest province and would therefore send the largest number of voting delegates to the conference. Although Dlamini-Zuma's campaign was publicly endorsed by former President Jacob Zuma, the KwaZulu-Natal provincial leadership said in late September that it preferred Mkhize. Outgoing ANC treasurer-general Paul Mashatile was also identified as a possible candidate for the presidency, but, more prominently, was endorsed for the deputy presidency by the provincial leadership of the ANC's Limpopo, Gauteng, and KwaZulu-Natal caucuses.

Provinces also lobbied for their favoured candidates to move into Top Six positions, though not necessarily the presidency; those candidates included David Makhura (Gauteng), Stan Mathabatha (Limpopo) for chairperson, Ronald Lamola (Mpumalanga) for deputy president, and Oscar Mabuyane (Eastern Cape) for deputy president. Former President Zuma said publicly that he was willing to accept nominations for the chairmanship, and suspended secretary-general Ace Magashule said that he expected to make a comeback at the conference.

=== Nominations ===
So-called branch nominations – nominations voted on by the ANC's local branches – opened on 7 September 2022; they were initially scheduled to end on 2 October, but the deadline was extended twice when many branches faced delays in holding meetings. Each branch was allowed to nominate one candidate for each of the Top Six positions (president, deputy president, chairperson, secretary general, deputy secretary general and treasurer), and the branch nominations were consolidated to develop a list of the three most popular nominees for each Top Six position, as well as the 200 most popular nominees for the NEC. This was a slight change from previous years, when branch nominations were first consolidated at the provincial level. The ANC's Electoral Committee, led by Kgalema Motlanthe, also screened and vetted all nominees.

On 22 November 2022, the Electoral Committee announced the consolidated nominations list for the Top Six positions. The branches' nominees were:

Position	Candidate	Nominations
President	Cyril Ramaphosa	2,037
President	Zweli Mkhize	916
Deputy President	Paul Mashatile	1,791
Deputy President	Ronald Lamola	427
Deputy President	Oscar Mabuyane	397
National Chairperson	Stanley Mathabatha	1,492
National Chairperson	Gwede Mantashe	978
National Chairperson	David Masondo	501
Secretary General	Mdumiseni Ntuli	1,225
Secretary General	Phumalo Masualle	889
Secretary General	Fikile Mbalula	749
Deputy Secretary General	Nomvula Mokonyane	1,779
Deputy Secretary General	Febe Potgieter-Gqubule	905
Treasurer General	Bejani Chauke	552
Treasurer General	Pule Mabe	428
Treasurer General	Mzwandile Masina	348

Further changes to the nominations list were made when the conference opened as four additional candidates – a historic number, according to the Business Day – were nominated from the floor of the plenary in the early hours of 18 December. The candidates for presidency, deputy presidency, national chairperson, and secretary general were confirmed as expected, though Nkosazana Dlamini-Zuma declined a nomination for the presidency from the floor and incumbent David Mabuza declined a nomination for the deputy presidency from the floor.

Unexpectedly, however, the Electoral Committee announced that Febe Potgieter-Gqubule, the Ramaphosa-aligned candidate for deputy secretary general, had declined her nomination by email, apparently leaving Nomvula Mokonyane to assume the post without contest. Two other possible candidates, Ambassador Vuyiswa Tulelo and Gwen Ramokgopa, declined nominations from the floor. After some delay, the Northern Cape delegation nominated Tina Joemat-Pettersson, a Member of Parliament and former minister, to stand against Mokonyane; Joemat-Pettersson accepted.

The conference had also amended the party's constitution to introduce a second deputy secretary general position, and two candidates, Maropene Ramokgopa and Ronalda Nalumango, were nominated from the floor for that office. Ramokgopa was Ramaphosa's special advisor on international relations in the Presidency, while Nalumango was an ANC councillor in the Cape Winelands District Municipality and co-led the ANC's Western Cape branch as coordinator of its interim leadership corps.

Finally, all three initial treasurer-general candidates accepted their nominations, and they were joined by Gwen Ramokgopa, who was nominated from the floor. Andile Lungisa was nominated from the floor but immediately disqualified due to his suspension from the party, and Lindiwe Sisulu accepted a nomination from the floor but failed to meet the required threshold of support from delegates present. Although Mzwandile Masina accepted his nomination and was included on the ballot paper, he later announced – on the evening of 18 December – that he would withdraw from the race and endorse Pule Mabe for the position; he said that they both supported Zweli Mkhize's candidacy for the presidency and that since they were both from Gauteng province, they did not wish to stand against each other and risk splitting the province's vote.

== Leadership election ==
After several delays, voting to elect the Top Seven officials began in the evening of Sunday 18 December and continued into the night. The results of the election, as announced on 19 December, were as follows (with winners in bold):

Position	Candidate	Votes	
President	**Cyril Ramaphosa**	**2,476**	**56.62%**
President	Zweli Mkhize	1,897	43.38%
Deputy President	**Paul Mashatile**	**2,178**	**50.06%**
Deputy President	Ronald Lamola	315	7.24%
Deputy President	Oscar Mabuyane	1,858	42.7%
National Chairperson	Stanley Mathabatha	2,018	46.28%
National Chairperson	**Gwede Mantashe**	**2,062**	**47.29%**
National Chairperson	David Masondo	280	6.42%
Secretary General	Mdumiseni Ntuli	1,080	24.76%
Secretary General	Phumalo Masualle	1,590	36.45%
Secretary General	**Fikile Mbalula**	**1,692**	**38.79%**
First Deputy Secretary General	**Nomvula Mokonyane**	**2,195**	**50.58%**
First Deputy Secretary General	Tina Joemat-Pettersson	2,145	49.42%
Second Deputy Secretary General	**Maropene Ramokgopa**	**2,373**	**54.92%**
Second Deputy Secretary General	Ronalda Nalumango	1,948	45.08%
Treasurer General	Bejani Chauke	590	13.62%
Treasurer General	Pule Mabe	1,652	38.13%
Treasurer General	Mzwandile Masina	281	6.49%
Treasurer General	**Gwen Ramokgopa**	**1,809**	**41.76%**

All of the winning candidates were aligned to Ramaphosa during the campaigning phase, except for Mokonyane and Mashatile.

== National Executive Committee ==
On the final day of the Conference delegates were required to vote in the top 80 leaders of the highest decision making body of the ANC, the National Executive Committee. The additional members list consists of

Rank	First Name	Last Name	Gender	Total
1	Zikalala	Sihle	M	2218
2	Manana	Mduduzi	M	2152
3	Lamola	Ronald	M	2115
4	Ntuli	Mdumiseni	M	2075
5	Cele	Bheki	M	2022
6	Mchunu	Senzo	M	1932
7	Gigaba	Malusi	M	1856
8	Mabe	Pule	M	1806
9	Kodwa	Zizi	M	1792
10	Makhura	David	M	1772
11	Lungisa	Andile	M	1758
12	Kubayi	Mmamoloko	F	1730
13	Joemat-Pettersson	Tina	F	1726
14	Ndabeni-Abrahams	Stella	F	1719
15	Nkadimeng	Thembi	F	1681
16	Mkhize	Zweli	M	1673
17	Lekganyane	Soviet	M	1653
18	Potgieter	Febe	F	1606
19	Godongwana	Enoch	M	1554
20	Besani	Sibongile	M	1546
21	Kekana	Pinky	F	1518
22	Manamela	Buti	M	1503
23	Mahlobo	David	M	1486
24	Mathale	Cassel	M	1478
25	Majodina	Pemmy	F	1470
26	Zulu	Lindiwe	F	1451
27	Motsoaledi	Aaron	M	1448
28	Diko	Khusela	F	1439
29	Dlamini	Bathabile	F	1430
30	Masualle	Phumulo	M	1425
31	Masina	Mzwandile	M	1408
32	Modise	Thandi	F	1405
33	Dlamini-Zuma	Nkosazana	F	1402
34	Gungubele	Mondli	M	1369
35	Didiza	Thoko	F	1362
36	Tau	Parks	M	1362
37	Bapela	Obed	M	1340
38	Mahumapelo	Supra	M	1336
39	Maswanganyi	Joe	M	1317
40	Mahambehlala	Tandi	F	1316
41	Masondo	David	M	1304
42	Madikizela	Babalo	M	1286
43	Kieviet	Noxolo	F	1275
44	Nzuza	Njabulo	M	1275
45	Masemola	Dickson	M	1268
46	Nkabane	Nobuhle	F	1248
47	Nkonyeni	Peggy	F	1248
48	Creecy	Barbara	F	1242
49	Ramokgopa	Kgosientsho Sputla	M	1229
50	Ntshavheni	Khumbudzo	F	1204
51	Phaahla	Joe	M	1204
52	Sisulu	Lindiwe	F	1187
53	Boshielo	Polly	F	1182
54	Godlimpi	Zuko	M	1172
55	Mhlauli	Nonceba	F	1168
56	Makwetla	Thabang	M	1167
57	Kekana	Nkenke	M	1158
58	Selamolela	Donald	M	1143
59	Xaba	Cyril	M	1128
60	Chikunga	Sindisiwe	F	1112
61	Legoete	Dakota	M	1111
62	Chauke	Benjani	M	1106
63	Ntshalintshali	Lindiwe	F	1092
64	Gcabashe	Lungi	F	1091
65	Mafu	Nocawe	F	1081
66	Nalumango	Ronalda	F	1067
67	Pule	Dina	F	1061
68	Maimela	Joy	F	1058
69	Motshekga	Angie	F	1052
70	Bhengu	Mahlengi	F	1038
71	Tshwete	Pam	F	1024
72	Letsatsi-Duba	Dipuo	F	1014
73	Mtshweni-Tsipane	Refilwe	F	1008
74	Meth	Nomakhosazana	F	997
75	Muthambi	Faith	F	992
76	Capa	Nokuzola Zoleka	F	986
77	Tolashe	Sisisi	F	973
78	Mhaule	Reginah	F	972
79	Siwela	Violet	F	969
80	Moraka	Thandi	F	946
