= Celeste Barker =

South African politician (1960–2024)

Member of the Eastern Cape Provincial Legislature
- In office 21 May 2014 – February 2019

Personal details
- Born: 7 July 1960 Cape Province, Union of South Africa
- Died: 20 November 2024 (aged 64) South Africa
- Party: Democratic Alliance (2000–2024)
- Other party: Democratic Party (1995–2000)

Celeste Heloise Barker (7 July 1960 – 20 November 2024) was a South African politician who served as a member of the Eastern Cape Provincial Legislature for the Democratic Alliance from 2014 until 2019.

== Political career ==
Barker was a member of the Black Sash during the apartheid era. She joined the Democratic Party in 1995 and then its successor party, the Democratic Alliance (DA), in 2000. She was elected to chair the party's provincial women's network structure in 2010, serving in that position until 2018.

During the 2014 national and provincial elections, Barker was elected to the Eastern Cape Provincial Legislature as a DA representative. Barker was the DA's Shadow Member of the Executive Council (MEC) for Health. She served in the provincial legislature until she was medically boarded by the party in February 2019, months before the 2019 general elections. Fezeka Mbiko was selected to replace her in the legislature.

== Death ==
Barker died on 20 November 2024, at the age of 64. The DA paid tribute to her.
