= Mpho Lekgoro =

South African politician

Member of the National Assembly
- In office June 1999 – 1 August 2007

Personal details
- Born: 1964 or 1965 (age 61–62)
- Citizenship: South Africa
- Party: African National Congress

Mpho Morepye Sephwe Lekgoro (born 1964 or 1965) is a South African politician who represented the African National Congress (ANC) in the National Assembly from 1999 to 2007. He was formerly an ANC Youth League activist.

== Anti-apartheid activism ==
Lekgoro was born in 1964 or 1965. He was a member of the United Democratic Front and South African Youth Congress in the 1980s and was detained for his anti-apartheid activism. He made international news in March 1989, aged 24, when he and three other young detainees escaped police custody and took refuge in the West German Embassy in Pretoria; they escaped from Hillbrow Hospital, where they had been receiving treatment for starvation after participating in a nationwide hunger strike by political detainees. The West German Embassy allowed them to stay. From 1994 to 1996, he was secretary-general of the ANC Youth League under league president Lulu Johnson, with Febe Potgieter as his deputy.

== Parliament: 1999–2007 ==
Lekgoro served in the post-apartheid Parliament of South Africa from 1999 to 2007, gaining election to the National Assembly in 1999 and 2004. During his second term he served as spokesperson for the ANC's parliamentary caucus. He resigned from Parliament on 1 August 2007 and was replaced as spokesperson by Khotso Khumalo.
