= Renaldo Gouws =

South African politician

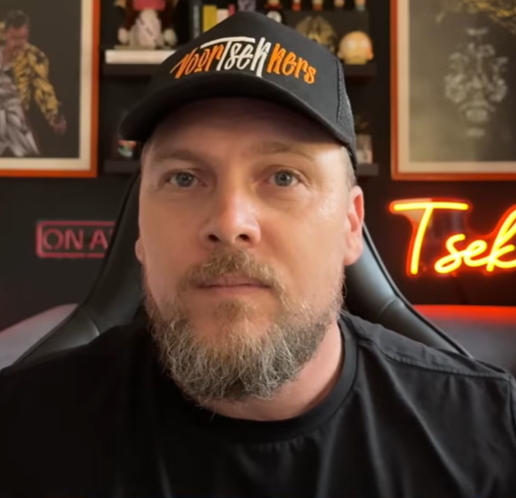
- Gouws in 2026

Member of the National Assembly of South Africa
- In office 14 June 2024 – 30 September 2024

Councillor Nelson Mandela Bay Metropolitan Municipality
- In office 18 August 2016 – 14 June 2024

Personal details
- Born: 2 May 1983 (age 42) Uitenhage, Eastern Cape, South Africa
- Party: Freedom Front Plus
- Other political affiliations: Democratic Alliance (until 2024)
- Spouse: Laurynne Meyer (m. 2014)
- Children: None

Renaldo Gouws (born 2 May 1983) is a South African YouTuber, industrial psychologist and former politician.

In 2024 he served as a Member of the National Assembly of South Africa, however after being accused of racism due to comments he made in videos recorded and subsequently deleted, his membership was terminated from the Democratic Alliance and he lost his seat as a member of parliament.

== Early life and education ==
Gouws was born in the small town of Uitenhage, Eastern Cape, and attended Hoërskool Brandwag. He studied at the Nelson Mandela University where he obtained a masters degree in industrial psychology in 2010. He currently does consultation work as an industrial psychologist.

== Political career ==
Gouws joined the DA in 2012. His political career began when he became the branch chairperson of Ward 2 in Nelson Mandela Bay in 2012. Gouws graduated in 2012 from the Provincial Young Leaders Program and the National Young Leadership Program in 2013. In 2016 he ranked high enough on the PR list for the DA to secure a seat for the Nelson Mandela Municipality Council. In 2019 he was elected as DA councillor for Ward 2 in a by-election where the DA received 94%. From 2019 Gouws served as the Spokesperson for Economic Development, Tourism and Agriculture for the DA in Nelson Mandela Bay.

During the COVID-19 pandemic, Gouws with his caucus leadership formulated a plan that would assist in turning the metro around.

Following the 2024 South African general election, Gouws was sworn in as a Member of Parliament for the DA, but his membership was terminated a few months later after an alleged racist video surfaced. In the video excerpt, published by Independent Online, Gouws used racial slurs calling for the 'killing of all black people'. The excerpt came from a longer video recorded by Gouws in 2010, which had previously been deleted from Gouws's YouTube channel but was still available in an archive from 2012. In the video, Gouws says he did not truly mean the words he said and that they were for the purpose of creating context for the anger at then ANC youth league leader Julius Malema singing the song 'Kill the Boer'.

Gouws took Independent Media to the Press Ombudsman for using only 4% (15 seconds) of the video and removing 96% of the video’s original context. The Press Ombudsman ruled in Gouws's favour by finding Independent Media guilty of four breaches of the press code as a result. Independent Media has since been expelled from the Press Council and therefore it is unsure whether Gouws will receive a public apology as requested by the Press Council of South Africa. In September 2025, Gouws announced that he had joined Freedom Front Plus.

== Andile Lungisa jug incident (2016) ==
During a council meeting in Nelson Mandela Bay in 2016, a brawl broke out that led to glass jugs being thrown around injuring people. Andile Lungisa broke a glass jug over a fellow councillor's head and was arrested for Grievous bodily harm. Gouws took footage of the incident which was used to convict Lungisa of assault.

== Social media activity and allegations ==
Gouws started a YouTube channel in 2009 with a focus on South African current events and politics. He used to do a debate show which is called the Sunday Service, in which he spoke to senior politicians, celebrities and thought leaders about South Africa. He has been accused and formally charged of racism, hate speech and incitement to violence. He has also been accused of homophobia, with videos circulating of him using homophobic language.
