= Department of Public Enterprises =

Enterprises state-owned in South Africa

- List: 10 other official names: Departement van Openbare Ondernemings (Afrikaans); umNyango wezamaBhizinisi womBuso (Southern Ndebele); iSebe lezaMashishini kaRhulumente (Xhosa); uMnyango Wezamabhizinisi Kahulumeni (Zulu); Litiko Leteluhwebo Lwahulumende (Swazi); Kgoro ya Dikgwebo tša Setšhaba (Northern Sotho); Lefapha la Dikgwebo tsa Setjhaba (Sotho); Lefapha la Ditiro tsa Setšhaba (Tswana); Ndzawulo ya Mabindzu ya Mfumo (Tsonga); Muhasho wa Mabindu a Tshitshavha (Venda)

Department overview
- Formed: 1994
- Dissolved: 2024
- Jurisdiction: Government of South Africa
- Ministers responsible: Pravin Gordhan, Minister of Public Enterprises; Gratitude Magwanishe, Deputy Minister of Public Enterprises
- Website: http://www.dpe.gov.za/

The Department of Public Enterprises (DPE) was one of the ministries of the South African government. It was the government's shareholder representative with oversight responsibility for a number of state-owned enterprises (SoEs). The department was shut down after the 2024 elections and folded into the Department of Planning, Monitoring and Evaluation (DPME) during the process of implementing a new shareholder model.

== Enterprises ==
It is estimated that South Africa has about 300 SoEs, nine of which fall under the responsibility of the DPE;

- Alexkor – Mining sector (diamond mining)
- Denel – Aerospace and Defence sector (armaments manufacturer)
- Eskom – Energy sector (national electricity utility)
- South African Express – Transport sector (regional and feeder airline)
- South African Forestry Company – Forestry sector (manages forestry on state owned-land)
- Transnet – Transport and related infrastructure sector (railways, harbours, oil/fuel pipelines and terminals)

Other corporate entities not under the Department of Public Enterprises include the South African Post Office, the South African Broadcasting Corporation, the South African Bureau of Standards, the Council for Scientific and Industrial Research and Sentech. Various other smaller state-owned companies exist in South Africa.

== See also ==
- Public Investment Corporation
