= Road Accident Fund =

The Road Accident Fund (RAF) is a South African state insurer that provides liability and collision insurance coverage to all drivers in South Africa. RAF does not cover property damage (such as damage to vehicles, buildings, and the contents of a vehicle).

The RAF issues settlements by assigning the claimant a percentage of responsibility for the accident and paying the claimant the percentage of a full settlement that was determined not to be their responsibility. Road Accident Fund collects insurance premiums through a levy on motor vehicle fuel.

== Principal activities ==
The RAF provides compulsory social insurance cover to all users of South African roads, both citizens and foreigners, against injuries sustained or death arising from accidents involving motor vehicles within the borders of South Africa. This cover is in the form of indemnity insurance to persons who cause the accident, as well as personal injury and death insurance to victims of motor vehicle accidents and their families. The RAF's mandate is to rehabilitate and compensate persons injured as a result of the negligent driving of motor vehicles and to promote road safety in South Africa.

== History ==
The RAF was established by the Road Accident Fund Act, 1996 and started operation on 1 May 1997. It assumed the rights, obligations, assets and liabilities of the Multilateral Motor Vehicle Accidents Fund.

Before 1997, the system of compulsory motor vehicle accident insurance was governed by the following legislation:

- Motor Vehicle Insurance Act, 1942 (Act No. 29 of 1942)
- Compulsory Motor Vehicle Insurance Act, 1972 (Act No. 56 of 1972)
- Motor Vehicle Accident Act, 1986 (Act No. 84 of 1986)
- Multilateral Motor Vehicle Accidents Fund Act, 1989 (Act No. 93 of 1989)

== Governing structure ==
The South African Government's oversight over the RAF includes:

- (National Assembly) through the relevant Portfolio Committee and the Standing Committee on Public Accounts ("SCOPA"); The Executive Authority
- Honourable Minister of Transport
- Board of the RAF.

The National Assembly has legislative powers and maintains oversight of the National Executive Authority and the RAF as an organ of State. In addition, Parliament oversees the Executive Authority who is required to provide Parliament with full and regular reports concerning matters under his control. Parliament exercises oversight of the RAF through the Transport Portfolio Committee and through SCOPA. The Portfolio Committee oversees service delivery and performance in accordance with the mandate of the RAF and its corporate strategy. It reviews financial and non-financial information, such as efficiency and effectiveness measures in delivering services against corporate goals.

The Minister of Transport is the Executive Authority of the RAF and is concerned with the financial viability and risks of the organization, as well as policy-making and monitoring of policy implementation to ensure that the RAF effectively delivers on its mandate. The board of directors acts as the Accounting Authority of the RAF and is accountable to the Executive Authority for the performance and affairs of the entity. The RAF's Board is responsible for determining the overall direction of the RAF, formulating and implementing policies that are necessary to achieve the RAF's strategic goals, and maintaining good corporate governance.

== Funding ==
The RAF can obtain its funding from several sources as outlined as fuel levy income, government grants paid by National Treasury when there is a pressing need such as an acute cash shortage, and borrowings which are an allowed source of funding according to the RAF Act, and investment income acquired from invested funds that occasionally result when the RAF's operational capacity prevents it from paying out all its funds.

=== RAF Fuel levy ===
The primary source of income for the RAF compensation scheme is a levy raised on fuel. The levy is measured in terms of cents per litre on petrol and diesel fuel sold in South Africa and forms part of the general fuel tax regulated by government. The fuel levy per litre is set by National Treasury on a yearly basis, whereas total fuel sales are influenced by a number of macro-economic factors. On an annual basis, the RAF requests National Treasury for an increase in the RAF Fuel Levy, based on a financial model and a calculation of its costs during the coming year. The full extent of the RAF Fuel Levy requested is seldom granted. This is because National Treasury has historically set the levy on the basis of a pay-as-you-go principle rather than with the purpose of establishing a fully funded position for the RAF. During the 2012 financial year the RAF Fuel Levy was set at 80 cents per litre.

The RAF is not involved in the collection of its fuel levy. The South African Revenue Service ("SARS") administers the collection of the fuel levy and pays it to the RAF, in accordance with provisions of the Customs and Excise Act, 1964 and the RAF Act. The two main variables that determine the income of the RAF are the volume of petrol and diesel sold per annum and the rate of the levy. The RAF Fuel Levy can be viewed as a compulsory contribution to social security benefits which is used only for the specific purposes as provided for in legislation.

=== Financial position ===
The RAF is affected by general economic conditions and other environmental factors, and by the extent to which it manages its costs effectively.

The nexus of all these factors is road activity in South Africa:

- The number of vehicles on the road influences the amount of fuel sold, which in turn affects the revenue granted to the RAF by National Treasury. This revenue comprises the fuel levy together with ad hoc government grants and minor income from investments to equal the RAF's total revenue.
- The number of vehicles on the road also influences the number of accidents, although many other factors influence this statistic, particularly the relative severity of accidents. Volume and severity of accidents influence the volume and average value of claims made against the RAF. Claims, combined with the cost of third parties, such as attorneys and medical/legal experts, and the RAF's administration costs, equal the RAF's total costs.

== Corruption ==
The road accident fund has struggled with inability to get on top of mounting claims, financial deficit and exorbitant claims. An investigation by the Special Investigating Unit (SIU) pointed to multiple failures including corruption. Opportunistic and fraudulent claims are being investigated. Problems identified include procurement and tender irregularities, duplicate claims, overpricing of services and fraudulent claims.

== Locations ==
The head office is in Centurion. Other offices are in Menlyn, Pretoria, Johannesburg, East London, Durban, and Cape Town.
