= National Planning Commission =

National Planning Commission may refer to

- Planning Commission (India)
- National Planning Commission of Namibia
- National Planning Commission of Nigeria
- Planning Commission (Pakistan)
- National Planning Commission of South Africa
- National Planning Commission of Nepal

== See also ==
- Planning Commission (disambiguation)
- State Planning Commission (disambiguation)
