= Alexkor =

South African company

- Company type: Unincorporated joint venture
- Industry: Diamond mining
- Founded: 1927
- Area served: Richtersveld area, north-west coast of South Africa
- Key people: Lemogang Pitsoe (CEO); Adila Chowan (CFO); T Matona (Chairperson)
- Revenue: ▼ R 170.57 million (2020)
- Operating income: ▼ R 5.98 million (2020)
- Net income: ▲ R −109.38 million (2020)
- Total assets: ▼ R 375.51 million (2020)
- Total equity: ▼ R 94.01 million (2020)
- Number of employees: 915 (2020)
- Website: alexkor.co.za

Alexkor is a South African unincorporated joint venture diamond mining company that falls under the Department of Public Enterprises. It was previously a state-owned enterprise, when in 2007 it entered a government-funded pooling and sharing joint venture with the Richtersveld community. The company's core business is diamond prospecting and seabed mining along the north-west coast of the Northern Cape Province of South Africa up to the border with Namibia. It was founded through the proclamation of the Alexkor Limited Act, No. 116 of 1992 (amended by the Alexkor Amendment Act, No. 29 of 2001). The company mines both land and coastal deposits for diamonds.

In 2003 mining activity by the company had decreased significantly due to losing a land claim in Alexkor Ltd v Richtersveld Community instituted by the Richtersveld community in the area surrounding Alexander Bay. This resulted in the company generating substantial losses between 2005 and 2009 and in turn lead to it accruing a debt of R275 million (US$41.4 million) in 2012 and receiving a R350 million bailout from national government in 2011. The company reported the production of 41,941 carats of diamonds in 2018 generating R409 million in revenue and R34 million in profit.

The company was involved in corruption allegations involving the Gupta family resulting in it being investigated by the Zondo Commission of Inquiry into State Capture. In April 2022 the Zondo Commission recommended that the company's executives and chairperson be investigated for fraud and other corrupt activities involving Gupta connected companies.
