= Industrial Development Corporation =

South African development finance institution

- Abbreviation: IDC
- Formation: 1940; 86 years ago
- Type: State-owned company
- Registration no.: 1940/014201/06
- Legal status: Active
- Headquarters: Johannesburg, Gauteng, South Africa
- Region served: Africa
- Services: Development finance and investment
- Fields: Industrial development
- Owner: Government of South Africa
- Chairperson: Gloria Serobe
- CEO: Mmakgoshi Lekhethe
- CFO: Isaac Nkululeko Malevu
- Revenue: ▼ R21.7 billion (2025)
- Disbursements: ▲ R16.3 billion (2025)
- Funding: Self-financing
- Staff: 856 (2025)
- Website: idc.co.za

The Industrial Development Corporation (IDC) is a South African state-owned development finance institution that provides funding and investment to promote industrial development and economic growth in South Africa and throughout the rest of the continent.

Founded in 1940 under the Industrial Development Corporation Act, and headquartered in Johannesburg, the IDC has played a major role in the development of South Africa's industrial sector.

== History ==
=== Establishment and early industrialization ===
The Industrial Development Corporation was established in 1940 under the Industrial Development Corporation Act, 1940, with the objective of promoting the establishment and development of industrial enterprises on proper business principles. Its establishment reflected the South African Government's desire to expand domestic manufacturing, reduce dependence on imported goods, and make greater use of South Africa's natural resources.

During its early years, the IDC helped establish and expand industries including textiles, processed foods, timber, and animal feed.

=== Industrial expansion and apartheid ===
From the 1950s, the IDC became increasingly involved in the development of large-scale resource processing and manufacturing industries. It helped finance Sasol, Foskor, and the South African Industrial Cellulose Corporation (SAICCOR), contributing to the development of the country's petrochemical, fertilizer, and pulp industries.

Under apartheid, the IDC became an important instrument of the state's industrial policy. It financed major strategic projects and participated in the government's industrial decentralization program, which sought to establish industries in designated areas outside the country's major urban centers.

The IDC also became involved in efforts to shift South Africa's manufacturing sector from import substitution toward greater export production. During the 1970s and 1980s, however, industrial policy increasingly became intertwined with the government's security priorities and the country's growing international isolation.

=== Post-apartheid transformation ===
Following the end of apartheid and the establishment of South Africa's first democratic government in 1994, the IDC was retained as a state-owned development finance institution, but its priorities were realigned with the policies of the new government.

The IDC increasingly focused on economic transformation, including the development of black-owned businesses and broader participation in the economy. Its activities were also aligned with successive government industrial policies and development strategies.

=== Expansion into Africa ===
In 1997, an amendment to the IDC's governing legislation expanded its geographical mandate beyond South Africa to the rest of Southern Africa. This enabled the IDC to finance cross-border industrial development projects and support the expansion of South African businesses across the region.

The Industrial Development Amendment Act, 2001 expanded the IDC's mandate to the rest of Africa, and explicitly enabled the organization to promote the economic empowerment of historically disadvantaged communities and persons, foster the development of small and medium-sized enterprises and cooperatives, and promote employment-creating activities.

Also in 1997, Mozal, an aluminum smelter in Mozambique, became the first project outside South Africa to receive IDC funding. The project marked the beginning of a broader role for the IDC in supporting industrial development elsewhere on the continent.

=== Recent developments ===
During the 2000s, the IDC expanded its activities into a wider range of sectors and projects, including infrastructure, telecoms, tourism, and media. It also participated in the financing of the Gautrain rapid rail transit project in Gauteng, and the establishment of telecoms operator Neotel.

In the 2010s, the IDC increasingly emphasized the creation and empowerment of black industrialists alongside its traditional industrial development activities. Its mandate continued to be aligned with government industrial policy, including the Industrial Policy Action Plan and the National Development Plan.

In October 2026, it was reported that the IDC had made an offer to purchase ArcelorMittal South Africa (AMSA), a local steel mining unit owned by Luxembourg-based ArcelorMittal. The IDC was said to include a cash component of around R3 billion, and the IDC assuming around R7 billion in debt accumulated by AMSA. The deal was set for shareholder vote by the end of 2026 and, if approved, would be one of the South African Government's biggest industrial interventions in years. When the deal was announced, the AMSA share price increased by 21%, giving the company a market value of R1.3 billion.

== Operations ==
As a development finance institution, the IDC's mandate is to promote industrial development and inclusive, employment-creating industrialization in South Africa, and the wider African region.

Its activities include identifying and funding industrial projects, supporting the expansion and modernization of existing businesses, and helping to establish new industries. The organization provides financing through loans, equity investments, and guarantees. It also provides advice to entrepreneurs and businesses relating to project development and management, corporate governance, finances, and training.

The IDC focuses its investments on sectors considered important to industrial development, including agro-processing, agriculture, automotive manufacturing, mining, chemicals, energy, infrastructure, tourism, and ICT. It also supports SMEs, black industrialists, and businesses owned or empowered by women and youth, with the aim of increasing economic participation and creating sustainable employment.

=== Financing ===
The organization finances its activities primarily through income and repayments from its investments, the disposal of mature investments, and borrowing in domestic and international markets. It reinvests the proceeds from its lending and equity investments into further development projects.

In addition to its direct investments in South Africa, the IDC invests elsewhere in Africa, where projects contribute to South African industrial development and regional economic integration.

== See also ==
- Economy of South Africa
- Department of Trade, Industry and Competition
