= Ronalda Nalumango =

South African politician (born 1978)

The Honourable Ronalda Nalumango MP

Member of the National Assembly
- Incumbent
- Assumed office 14 June 2024

Personal details
- Born: 27 September 1978 (age 48) Kylemore, South Africa
- Party: African National Congress
- Spouse: Victor Nalumango
- Relations: Mutale Nalumango (aunt-in-law)
- Education: Stellenbosch University

Ronalda Schivonne Nalumango (born 27 September 1978) is a South African politician from the Western Cape. She has represented the African National Congress (ANC) in the National Assembly of South Africa since her election in the May 2024 general election.

Formerly a local councillor in the Cape Winelands, Nalumango rose to prominence as the interim coordinator of the Western Cape branch of the ANC, a position she held between 2019 and 2023. During that time, in December 2022, she was elected to a five-year term on the ANC National Executive Committee. The election took place at the ANC's 55th National Conference, during which Nalumango also stood unsuccessfully for election as deputy secretary-general of the ANC.

== Early life and education ==
Born on 27 September 1978, Nalumango was born and raised in Kylemore. She matriculated at Hoër Meisieskool Bloemhof, where she was supported by a sports bursary, and attended Stellenbosch University.

== Political career ==
Nalumango entered politics through the Youth League of the African National Congress (ANC), serving a term on the league's national executive committee from 2011 to 2012. She later represented the ANC as a local councillor in the Western Cape, both in the Cape Winelands District Municipality and in the Stellenbosch Local Municipality. In the May 2019 general election, she stood as an ANC candidate for election to the National Assembly, but she was ranked 14th on the party list in the Western Cape constituency and, due to the ANC's poor electoral performance in the province, she did not win a seat.

=== ANC Interim Provincial Committee: 2019–2023 ===
Shortly after the 2019 election, the ANC's national leadership disbanded the incumbent Provincial Executive Committee of the Western Cape ANC. Thereafter, on 15 August 2019, Nalumango was appointed to the head of the 30-member interim provincial committee (IPC) that was tasked with leading the provincial party until fresh leadership elections could be held. She was appointed as coordinator of the IPC, while Lerumo Kalako served as its convenor.

Nalumango and Kalako held those positions during the party's preparations for the 2021 local elections in the Western Cape. In the run-up to the elections, Kgalema Motlanthe, the head of the ANC's internal electoral committee, recommended that Nalumango should face disciplinary proceedings for alleged mismanagement of the candidate selection process and related dereliction of duty. Nalumango's duties also included ex officio membership in the ANC National Executive Committee (NEC). At an NEC meeting in November 2022, News24 said that Nalumango was "among the first" to call for President Cyril Ramaphosa to step aside from his office due to the Phala Phala scandal.

=== ANC 55th National Conference: 2022 ===
In December 2022, as IPC coordinator Nalumango attended the ANC's 55th National Conference at Nasrec, where the party resolved to amend its constitution to create the position of ANC second deputy secretary-general. In the early hours of 18 December, Nalumango was one of two candidates nominated from the floor of the conference to stand for election to that office. She was viewed as aligned to the campaign of presidential candidate Zweli Mkhize, while her opponent, Maropene Ramokgopa, was a close ally of incumbent ANC president Ramaphosa.

On 19 December, Ramokgopa was named as second deputy secretary-general, having received 2,373 votes against Nalumango's 1,948. However, the conference elected Nalumango to a five-year term as an ordinary member of the NEC; by number of votes received, she was ranked 66th of the 80 ordinary members elected, receiving 1,067 votes across 4,029 ballots.

At the NEC's first meeting in February 2023, Nalumango was elected as convenor of the NEC's delegation to the party's provincial structures in the Northern Cape. The Cape Argus reported that she would resign from the Western Cape IPC in order to take up her duties in the ANC's national leadership.

== National Assembly: 2024–present ==
Ahead of the May 2024 general election, Nalumango stood as an ANC candidate, ranked 29th on the party's national list. She was elected to a seat in the National Assembly, the lower house of the South African Parliament.

== Personal life ==
She is married to Victor Nalumango, who is the nephew by marriage of Mutale Nalumango, the vice president of Zambia.
