= Maropene Ramokgopa =

South African politician (born 1979)

The Honourable Maropene Ramokgopa MP
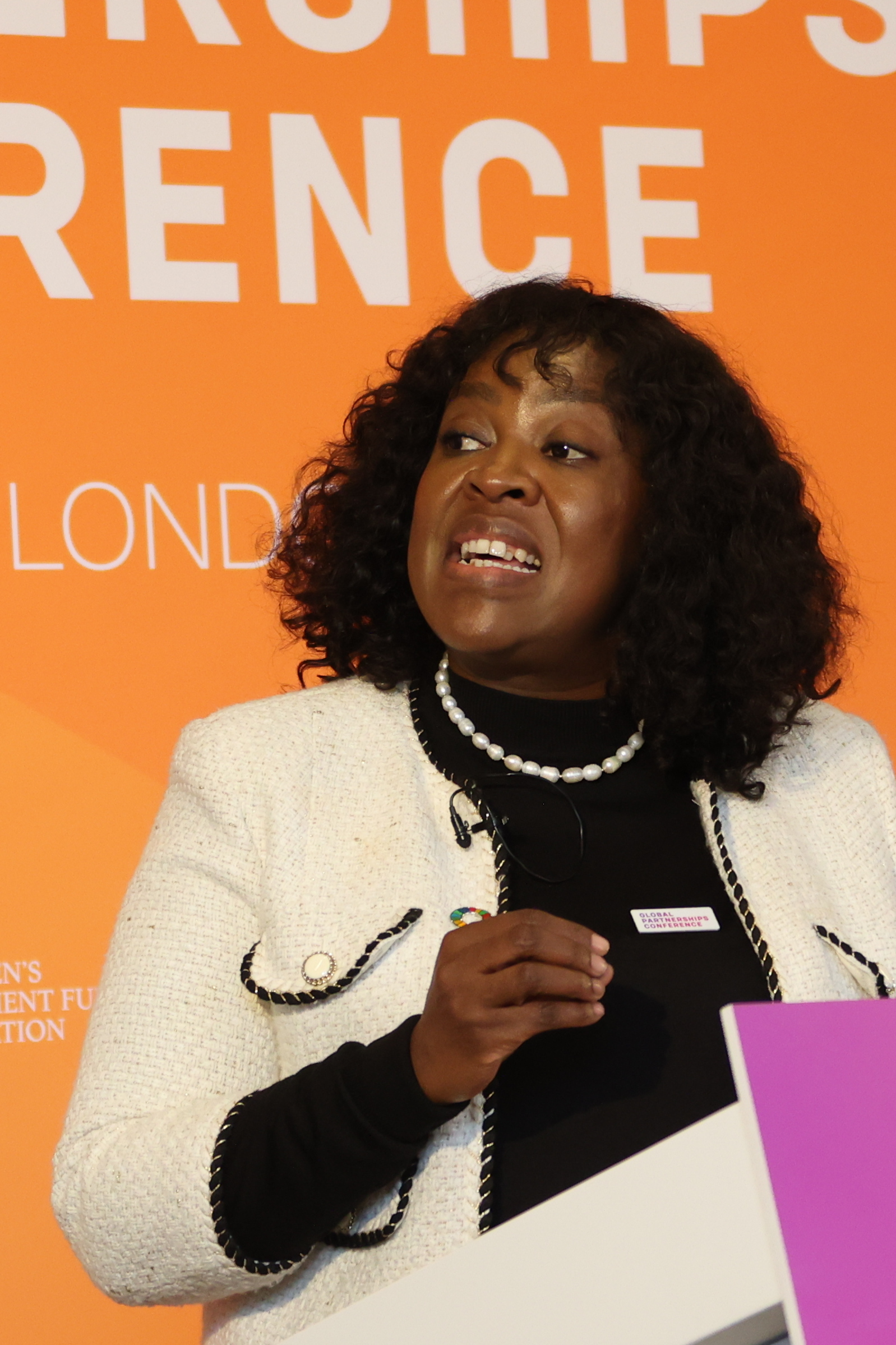
- Ramokgopa in 2026

Minister in the Presidency responsible for Planning, Monitoring and Evaluation
- Incumbent
- Assumed office 7 March 2023
- President: Cyril Ramaphosa
- Deputy: Pinky Kekana; Seiso Mohai
- Preceded by: Office established

Acting Minister of Sports, Arts and Culture
- In office 7 June 2024 – 19 June 2024
- President: Cyril Ramaphosa
- Preceded by: Zizi Kodwa
- Succeeded by: Gayton Mackenzie

Member of the National Assembly of South Africa
- Incumbent
- Assumed office 6 February 2023
- Preceded by: Masefako Dikgale
- Constituency: Limpopo

Deputy Secretary-General of the African National Congress
- Incumbent
- Assumed office 19 December 2022 Serving with Nomvula Mokonyane
- Secretary-General: Fikile Mbalula
- Preceded by: Jessie Duarte

Personal details
- Born: 31 December 1979 (age 46) Polokwane, Transvaal; South Africa
- Party: African National Congress

Maropene Ramokgopa (born 31 December 1979) is a South African politician who has been the Minister in the Presidency Responsible for Planning, Monitoring and Evaluation since March 2023. She has been a Member of the National Assembly since February 2023 and the Second Deputy Secretary-General of the African National Congress (ANC) since December 2022. She is also the coordinator of the interim task team that was appointed in June 2022 to lead the ANC Women's League.

Before joining the government in 2023, Ramokgopa held several positions in the diplomatic and civil service, including as Consul-General to Mumbai, India and, most proximately, as a special advisor to President Cyril Ramaphosa. She was the Mayor of the Northern Cape's Siyanda District Municipality from 2006 to 2009.

== Early life ==
Born on 31 December 1979 in Polokwane in the former Transvaal, Ramokgopa grew up in Lebowakgomo, a township outside Polokwane. She is a former student activist.

== Early career ==
Ramokgopa became a ward councillor for the African National Congress (ANC) in 2005, serving in the Kgatelopele Local Municipality in the Northern Cape. From 2006 to 2009, she served as executive mayor of the Northern Cape's Siyanda District Municipality; she was only 26 at the time of her election. Then, from 2009 to 2013, she entered the civil service as manager of the Northern Cape Premier's Office on the Status of Women.

She was elected to the National Executive Committee of the ANC Women's League (ANCWL) in 2008 and, under ANCWL President Angie Motshekga, she later held a managerial position in the league and convened its Young Women's Desk. She was also on the National Executive Committee of the ANC Youth League and was appointed to an interim task team which led the Youth League after its leadership corps was disbanded by the mainstream ANC in 2013. She has also served on the board of the National Youth Development Agency.

In 2014, Ramokgopa began work as a manager in the office of the Minister of International Relations and Cooperation, a position then filled by Maite Nkoana-Mashabane. She left the ministry in 2016, when President Jacob Zuma appointed her as South African Consul-General to Mumbai, India. Upon her return to South Africa, President Cyril Ramaphosa appointed her his special advisor on international relations in the Presidency, initially as his chief advisor at the African Union. In October 2021, she was one of five special envoys appointed by Ramaphosa to engage with King Mswati during pro-democracy protests in neighbouring Eswatini.

She was elected to the Provincial Executive Committee of the Limpopo branch of the ANC in 2022. In late June 2022, the ANC National Executive Committee appointed her coordinator of the interim task team of the ANCWL; in this capacity she, alongside task team convenor Baleka Mbete, will lead the league until it elects a new leadership corps.

== Election as Deputy Secretary-General ==
Ahead of the ANC's 55th National Conference, Ramokgopa was viewed as a supporter of Ramaphosa's campaign for re-election as ANC President and as a key member of the so-called "women's caucus" within the pro-Ramaphosa camp. In September 2022, the pro-Ramaphosa Provincial Executive Committee of the Northern Cape ANC endorsed Ramokgopa as a candidate for Deputy Secretary-General of the party. She was not initially included on the list of candidates but once the conference began in December 2022, the party resolved to create a new Second Deputy Secretary-General position; Ramokgopa was nominated from the floor of the conference to fill the post.

On 19 December, she won the election for Second Deputy Secretary-General, earning 2,373 votes against the 1,948 received by Ronalda Nalumango. She serves alongside First Deputy Secretary-General Nomvula Mokonyane and under Secretary-General Fikile Mbalula.

== National government ==
On 5 February 2023, it was reported that Ramokgopa was one of four senior ANC members who would be sworn in as a member of the National Assembly the following day. Ramokgopa was sworn in as a Member of Parliament on 6 February, alongside Paul Mashatile, Sihle Zikalala, and Parks Tau.

In a cabinet reshuffle on 6 March 2023, President Ramaphosa appointed Ramokgopa as Minister in the Presidency Responsible for Planning, Monitoring and Evaluation. She was sworn into office the following day.

When Zizi Kodwa had to step aside as Minister of Sports, Arts and Culture in terms of ANC internal policy (due to corruption charges being brought against him) she was appointed Acting minister for a short period in mid-2024, being succeeded on 3 July 2024 by Gayton McKenzie.

Ramokgopa was reappointed as Minister in the Presidency Responsible for Planning, Monitoring and Evaluation after the 2024 general election, and was sworn in again on 3 July 2024.
