= Brand South Africa =

South African national government agency

- Abbreviation: Brand SA
- Formation: 2002; 24 years ago
- Type: Schedule 3A public entity and trust
- Legal status: Active
- Headquarters: Johannesburg, Gauteng, South Africa
- Region served: South Africa
- Services: Nation branding Marketing; Communications; Reputation management
- Chairperson: Ipeleng Selele
- Chief Executive Officer: Neville Matjie
- Chief Financial Officer: Sherylee Shaik
- Deputy Chairperson: Zama Mkosi
- Board of directors: Board of Trustees
- Publication: Brand SA Annual Report
- Parent organization: The South African Presidency
- Budget: ▲ R235.2 million (2025/26)
- Revenue: ▼ R200.6 million (2024/25)
- Expenses: ▼ R206.7 million (2024/25)
- Funding: Government grants and subsidies Partnership income Finance income
- Staff: 52 (2024/25)
- Website: brandsouthafrica.com
- Formerly called: International Marketing Council of South Africa

Brand South Africa (Brand SA) is a South African government agency responsible for managing and promoting the country's nation brand and reputation. It sits within the Office of the Presidency, reporting to the Minister in the Presidency.

Established in 2002 as the International Marketing Council of South Africa, it was renamed Brand South Africa in 2011. The organization works to improve South Africa's global competitiveness by promoting the country as an investment, trade, tourism, and study destination, while also promoting national pride, patriotism, and social cohesion among South Africans.

== History ==
Brand South Africa was established in 2002 as the International Marketing Council of South Africa (IMCSA), with the purpose of developing and implementing a proactive and coordinated international marketing and communication strategy for South Africa, aimed at promoting the country as a destination for investment, trade, and tourism.

The organization initially operated under the Government Communication and Information System (GCIS) and worked with government, business, and civil society to develop a unified image for the country. In its early years, it established a communications resource center, developed the South Africa brand definition, and launched mass marketing campaigns aimed at both domestic and international audiences.

From 2009, the organization played a prominent role in presenting South Africa internationally at the World Economic Forum in Davos. Working with government and business leaders, the International Marketing Council helped establish a high-profile South African presence at the annual meeting, which was used to promote the country's business, investment, and tourism interests.

In 2011, the organization was renamed to Brand South Africa, reflecting its role in serving as custodian of the country's nation brand.. The organization was also transferred from GCIS to the Presidency during the 2011/12 financial year.

In August 2011, Brand South Africa launched Play Your Part, a domestic campaign encouraging South Africans to contribute to positive social change and to view active citizenship as part of building the country's nation brand. The initiative subsequently developed into a long-running nationwide program involving schools, community initiatives, media, and public figures.

During the early 2010s, Brand South Africa expanded its emphasis on active citizenship alongside international reputation management. Its Play Your Part program developed an ambassador network that recognized individuals making contributions to their communities and used their public profiles to encourage wider participation in nation-building activities.

In 2016, Brand South Africa established the Nation Brand Forum as a platform for government, business, and civil society to coordinate their efforts to strengthen the country's image and reputation. The forum became an annual stakeholder platform for discussing the positioning and competitiveness of the South African nation brand.

In January 2025, Brand South Africa led the country's nation branding presence at the World Economic Forum in Davos, including the South Africa House, which hosted business and government engagements and cultural programs. The organization worked with corporate partners to promote South Africa's investment proposition and support the country's G20 agenda.

During 2024/25, Brand South Africa also increased its emphasis on supporting South Africa's G20 presidency and used international platforms to promote the country's economic, cultural, and investment profile. Its 2024/25 Global Reputation Study recorded improvements in five of six measured dimensions of South Africa's international reputation during the year.

== Operations ==
Brand SA's primary role is to manage and promote South Africa's nation brand and international reputation. It conducts research into perceptions of South Africa, develops strategies to improve the country's reputation and competitiveness, and coordinates nation branding activities with government, business, and civil society.

The organization promotes South Africa internationally as a destination for investment, trade, tourism, and business, including through international events and platforms such as the World Economic Forum in Davos. Domestically, it promotes active citizenship and national pride through initiatives such as Play Your Part, while engaging stakeholders through the Nation Brand Forum and other programs.

== Governance ==
Brand SA is part of the Office of the Presidency, and reports to the Minister in the Presidency. It is governed by the Public Finance Management Act, No. 1 of 1999 and the National Treasury Regulations, 2024.

The organization is led by a Board of Trustees, all of whom are non-executive, and appointed by the President of South Africa for a 3-year term. The board meets at least four times a year. The CEO is an ex officio executive trustee in terms of the Brand SA Trust Deed.

== See also ==
- Tourism in South Africa
- Culture of South Africa
