= National Youth Development Agency =

South African government agency

Agency overview
- Formed: 2009; 17 years ago
- Preceding agencies: National Youth Commission; Umsobomvu Youth Fund
- Jurisdiction: South Africa
- Headquarters: Johannesburg, Gauteng, South Africa
- Agency executives: Sunshine Minenhle Myende, Chairperson; Ndumiso Kubheka-Hadebe, CEO
- Parent agency: Department of Women, Youth and Persons with Disabilities
- Website: nyda.gov.za

The National Youth Development Agency (NYDA) is a South African government agency established by the National Youth Development Agency Act (Act 54 of 2008) to address the socio-economic challenges faced by youth aged 14 through 35 in South Africa.

The agency has been part of the Department of Women, Youth and Persons with Disabilities since June 2019.

== History ==
It was formed in 2009 by merging the National Youth Commission and the Umsobomvu Youth Fund, inheriting their staff and programmes.

The NYDA Board is appointed by the President of South Africa under the NYDA Act. In July 2025, President Ramaphosa appointed a new board effective from 1 August 2025.

== See also ==
- Harambee Youth Employment Accelerator
- South African National Youth Orchestra Foundation
