= List of dignitaries at the state funeral of Nelson Mandela =

This is a list of dignitaries at the state funeral of Nelson Mandela on Sunday, 15 December 2013, at Mandela's rural home village of Qunu in the Eastern Cape.

== Dignitaries ==
=== Heads of state and government ===
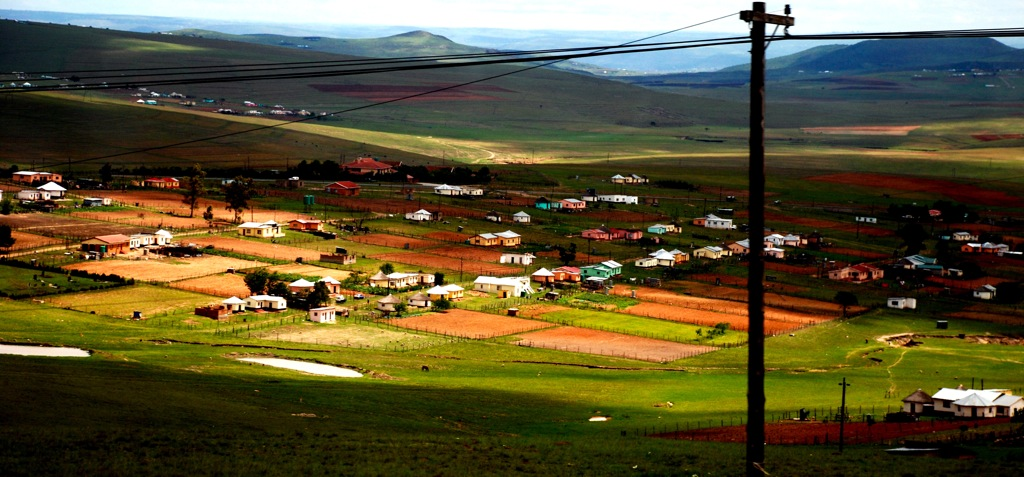
Qunu village, with Mandela's residence with red roof visible in the centre

Country RSA	Title: Mr	Dignitary	Notes
South Africa	President	Jacob Zuma	Chief mourner
Ethiopia	Prime Minister	Hailemariam Desalegn	African Union Chairperson
Lesotho	King	Letsie III	
Malawi	President	Joyce Banda	SADC Chairperson
Monaco	Prince	Albert II	
Saint Kitts and Nevis	Prime Minister	Denzil Douglas	
Saint Vincent and the Grenadines	Prime Minister	Ralph Gonsalves	
Tanzania	President	Jakaya Kikwete	Representing the Frontline States
United States	President	Barack Obama	

=== Government representatives ===
Country	Title	Dignitary
China	Vice President	Li Yuanchao
Ethiopia	State Minister	Surafiel Mhreteab Abed
Iran	Vice President	Mohammad Shariatmadari
Lesotho	Foreign Minister	Mohlabi Tsekoa
Malawi	Foreign Minister	Ephraim Chiume
Nicaragua	Vice President	Moises Omar Halleslevens Acevedo
Russia	Chairwoman of the Federation Council	Valentina Matviyenko
Tanzania	Foreign Minister	Bernard Membe
United Kingdom	Prince of Wales	Prince Charles
Zambia	Vice President	Guy Scott
Zambia	Foreign Minister	Wilbur Simuusa

=== International organizations ===
Organisation	Title	Dignitary
African Union	Chairperson of the AU Commission	Nkosazana Dlamini-Zuma
European Union	Head of Delegation in Pretoria	Roeland van der Geer

=== Former leaders ===
Country	Title	Dignitary
France	164th Prime Minister	Alain Juppé
France	165th Prime Minister	Lionel Jospin
Nigeria	11th Vice President	Atiku Abubakar
Norway	27th Prime Minister	Jens Stoltenberg
United States	42nd President	Bill Clinton
Zambia	1st President	Kenneth Kaunda

=== Eminent persons ===
Country	Title	Dignitary
Ireland	President of Sinn Féin	Gerry Adams
Tanzania	Former First Lady	Maria Nyerere
Tanzania	Representative from Chama Cha Mapinduzi	Vicky Swai
United States	Reverend	Jesse Jackson

Republic of China (Taiwan): The ROC Ministry of Foreign Affairs decided not to send a delegation because of the time constraint. Instead, Foreign Minister David Lin personally visited the Liaison Office of South Africa to convey condolences over the death of Mandela. In addition, the Representative of the ROC to South Africa visited the Union Buildings in Pretoria to view the remains of Mandela and pay respects on behalf of the ROC government.
