= Gugu (given name) =

- Gender: Female
- Language: Nguni languages

Other gender
- Feminine: Nomagugu

Origin
- Derivation: Gugulethu
- Meaning: Treaure/ Pride

Gugu is a given name derived, from the Nguni word igugu, meaning "treasure/pride". Notable people with the name include:

- Gugu Dlamini (1962–1998), South African HIV/AIDS activist
- Gugu Dhlamini (born 2005), South African soccer player
- Gugu Gumede, South African actress
- Gugu Mbatha-Raw (born 1983), English actress
- Gugulethu Zuma-Ncube (born 1985), South African film producer
