= Mbabane Government Hospital =

Mbabane Government HospitalMbabane Government Hospital

Geography
- Location: Television Road, Mbabane, Eswatini
- Coordinates: 26°19′54″S 31°8′37″E

Organisation
- Type: General

Services
- Beds: 500

Links
- Lists: Hospitals in Eswatini

Mbabane Government Hospital is the national hospital in Mbabane, Eswatini with 500 beds. Nkosazana Dlamini-Zuma worked at this hospital at a paediatric nurse in the 1980s. In 2007, the Minister for Health and Social Welfare, Njabulo Mabuza, banned the media from entering the hospital.

In September 2018 as the government had not paid suppliers the hospital ran out of food for patients.
