= Charles Myeza =

Swazi politician and police officer

Charles Myeza (born 25 April 1966) is a Swazi politician and former police officer.

== Biography ==
He became MP for Khubuta constituency in 2008, succeeding Njabulo Mabuza. Myeza controversially was arrested and charged with fraud in which he was alleged to have been part of a racket which robbed the government of 600,000 Emalangeni. He was forced to end his career as a police officer following the scandal. The case is ongoing as of 2012 and postponed in late January when Myeza told his lawyer Mduduzi Mabila and Judge Nkululeko Hlophe that he was unwell.

ABOUT: Charles Simon Myeza was born on 25 April 1966 at KaPhunga. Born with an unknown number of siblings. Charles grew up and attended the high school at Hlatikhulu, where his elder brother(Samson Myeza) was paying for his fees. Charles later joined and excelled in the police force.
