= Gugulethu (name) =

- Gender: Female
- Language: Nguni languages

Other gender
- Feminine: Nomagugu

Origin
- Meaning: Our Treasure/ Our Pride

Other names
- Short form: Gugu
- Nickname: Gugu
- Derived: igugu lethu "our treasure/pride"

Gugulethu is a feminine given name derived, from the Nguni word igugu lethu, meaning "our treasure/pride". Notable people with the name include:

- Gugulethu Mayisela (born 2004), South African model
- Gugulethu Sophia Mbatha (born 1983), English actress
- Gugulethu Mchunu, South African politician
- Gugulethu Mfuphi, South African broadcast journalist
- Gugulethu Zuma-Ncube (born 1985), South African producer and actress

== See also ==
- Gugulethu, a township in Western Cape, South Africa
- Gugulethu Seven, a group of South African anti-apartheid men shot by South African Police on 3 March 1986
