= Nkululeko =

Nkululeko (Nonkululeko female) is a masculine given name derived from the Nguni word Inkululeko, meaning "freedom/liberty". Notable people with the name include:

- Nkululeko Gwala (-2013), South African activist
- Nkululeko Hlophe, Liswati judge
- Nkululeko Serame (born 1987), South African cricketer
- Nkululeko Mkastos Sibanda (born 1979), Zimbabwean politician
