= The Luke Commission =

Nonprofit healthcare organization in Eswatini

- Formation: 2005
- Founders: Harry and Echo VanderWal
- Type: Nonprofit organization
- Legal status: 501(c)(3) (United States); NGO (Eswatini)
- Headquarters: Sidvokodvo, Eswatini; Sagle, Idaho, United States
- Region served: Eswatini
- Services: Healthcare delivery, hospital care, mobile outreach, digital health
- Website: www.lukecommission.org

The Luke Commission (TLC) is a nonprofit healthcare organization based in Eswatini, Southern Africa. Founded in 2005 by North American medical professionals Harry and Echo VanderWal, TLC provides specialty hospital care, mobile outreach services, and digital health solutions in a resource-limited setting.

== History ==
The Luke Commission was established in 2005 after the VanderWals relocated to Eswatini, then experiencing one of the highest HIV/AIDS prevalence rates in the world. TLC began with mobile outreach clinics serving rural communities and expanded over time into a national healthcare provider.

== Facilities ==
TLC operates from a 200-acre site near Sidvokodvo known as the Miracle Campus. The campus includes inpatient and outpatient services, intensive care units, surgical theaters, and training facilities.

During the COVID-19 pandemic, TLC constructed one of the largest oxygen plants in Southern Africa to meet national demand.

== Programs ==
TLC provides a combination of:

- Mobile outreach clinics serving remote communities
- Specialty hospital care and surgical services
- Management of chronic diseases such as HIV and tuberculosis
- Emergency response including snakebite antivenom distribution
- Digital health through the Luvelo platform, coordinating patient records, supply chain, and workforce management.

== Recognition ==
TLC has been featured in international media including The Washington Post, This American Life, and the Bureau of Investigative Journalism.

In 2024, the organization received the African Supply Chain Excellence Award for Technology and Information Systems.

== See also ==
- Healthcare in Eswatini
- Harry and Echo VanderWal
