= Nonkululeko =

Nonkululeko (Nkululeko male) is a feminine given name derived from the Nguni word Inkululeko, meaning "freedom/liberty". Notable people with the name include:

- Nonkululeko Gobodo (born 1960), South African businesswoman
- Nonkululeko Mlaba (born 2000), South African cricketer
- Nonkululeko Nyembezi-Heita (born 1960), South African engineer and businesswoman
