= Thuthukile Zuma =

South African civil servant

Chief of Staff, Department of Telecommunications and Postal Services
- In office May 2014 – December 2015
- Succeeded by: Frans Mthombeni

Personal details
- Born: 28 April 1989 (age 37)
- Party: African National Congress
- Parent(s): Jacob Zuma; Nkosazana Dlamini-Zuma

Thuthukile Zuma (born 28 April 1989) is the youngest of former South African president Jacob Zuma's four daughters with ex-wife Nkosazana Dlamini-Zuma.

She was the chief of staff to Minister Siyabonga Cwele in the Department of Telecommunications and Postal Services, and held the distinction of being the youngest head of a minister's office ever appointed in South Africa. Her appointment was criticised due to her youth, her perceived lack of skills and experience for the position, and her close personal relationship with the president, raising concerns of nepotism.

== Controversies ==
Thuthukile Zuma attacks Mk party saying its shapeless and has no direction.

== Early life ==
Zuma graduated from Westerford High School in December, 2006, and went on to complete a degree in anthropology in 2012 from the University of Witwatersrand. She co-owns Nyenyedzi Productions with her sisters Nokuthula Nomaqhawe and Gugulethu Zuma-Ncube, which production company produced Mzansi Magic's sitcom, It's for Life, in 2011. Also in 2011, she and her sister Gugulethu volunteered at Luthuli House, the headquarters of the African National Congress (ANC).

She then joined the State Security Agency as a public liaison officer for less than a year, and, after the 2014 national elections, moved to the position of chief of staff for the Department of Telecommunications and Postal Services, where she received an annual salary of almost R1 million. It was reported that the position was never advertised, contrary to proper government procurement procedures. A statement released by the department stated that “The minister only considered her capacity to do the job and her qualifications. Her genealogy was never a consideration.” The Public Service Commission investigated the appointment after complaints were lodged.

Zuma resigned from her position as chief of staff in December, 2015. As of 2017 she continued to be involved in the ANC, and politics on behalf of her father and mother.
