= Virodene =

Vaccine description
- Target: HIV/AIDS
- Vaccine type: anti-bacterial

Clinical data
- Routes of administration: transdermal patch

Legal status
- Legal status: rejected

Virodene was claimed to be an HIV/AIDS drug developed in South Africa, but was rejected by the scientific community. Controversy surrounded the research procedures, political interference and the safety and efficacy of the drug itself, the main active ingredient of which is the highly toxic industrial solvent dimethylformamide.

Michelle Olga Patricia Visser, working as a medical technician at Pretoria Hospital (now Steve Biko Academic Hospital), said that she discovered the anti-bacterial properties of dimethylformamide while conducting experiments to freeze animal hearts using this substance. In conjunction with her businessman husband, Jacques Siegfried "Zigi" Visser, she administered the drug to 11 patients without approval. The Vissers also required the participants to keep the experiment secret, an ethical lapse that diverged with best practices for informed consent. They were rebuked for these actions and the South African Medicines Control Council blocked further human trials. Two cardio-thoraic surgeons at the University of Pretoria, Professor Dirk du Plessis and Dr Kallie Landauer, were also rebuked.

More human trials were conducted in Tanzania in 2000 even after the South African Medicines Control Council ruled that such trials would be unethical and in contravention of the law and refused permission for human trials in 1998. The Tanzania National Institute for Medical Research (NIMR) also rejected proposals for human trials, but the Vissers approached the Tanzania People's Defence Force directly and conducted the trials in military hospitals.

Calls were made for an investigation of South African President Thabo Mbeki's involvement in support or funding of the company.

== Controversy ==
=== Fraudulent credentials ===
Olga Visser claimed she was a full professor and head of the department of New Technologies in Medicine at Moderna University in Lisbon, Portugal, but officials insisted there is no record of her on the faculty or even of such a department.

=== Human trials ===
On several occasions the Vissers conducted human trials without any authorisation from the appropriate health authorities.

=== Political interference ===
In 1997, the researchers were allowed to make presentations to the South African Cabinet. They received support from Thabo Mbeki, then South African deputy president and Nkosazana Dlamini-Zuma, the health minister at the time. Mbeki criticised the Medicines Control Council, stating that "it became more and more difficult to understand the attitude adopted by the MCC" and that "I and many others will not rest until the efficacy or otherwise of Virodene is established scientifically" in direct opposition to the rejection of human trials by the Medicines Control Council.

In the same letter Mbeki went as far as suggesting that parties who caused the controversy surrounding Virodene wanted to create the AIDS pandemic in Sub-Saharan Africa:

Two thirds of those affected world-wide are in Sub-Saharan Africa, including a 2,8 million strong South African contingent. Often I have wondered whether those who have generated sand storms with the greatest enthusiasm, did not, in fact, seek to achieve precisely this result!

— Thabo Mbeki,

Some analysts pointed out that the mere involvement of senior government officials in a regulatory process for which there exists well established regulatory bodies such as the Medicines Control Council could only ever serve to open up the process to charges of maladministration.

=== Funding ===
==== ANC ====
In 1999 it was revealed that several businessmen with close ties to Mbeki —by then President of South Africa— such as Max Maisela, invested heavily into Virodene companies.

Maisela was on Mbeki's "consultative council" during Mbeki's tenure as Deputy President and at the time of the investments headed Negotiated Benefits Consultants (NBC) which was owned by Worldwide Africa Holdings a company co-founded by Wiseman Nkhuhlu, then presidential advisor to Mbeki.

Reports alleging investment from source close to government again surface in 2007. The fresh reports by the newspaper The Saturday Star suggested investments between 2000 and 2001 that tapered off after the trials in Tanzania were aborted, allegations denied by the Presidency.

==== Alcor Life Extension Foundation ====
Initial funding came from the controversial cryonics (low temperature preservation of humans after death) company Alcor Life. The funding came because of the main Virodene founder's research into the freezing and thawing of animal hearts.
