= Death and state funeral of Nelson Mandela =

2013 funeral of the first South African president

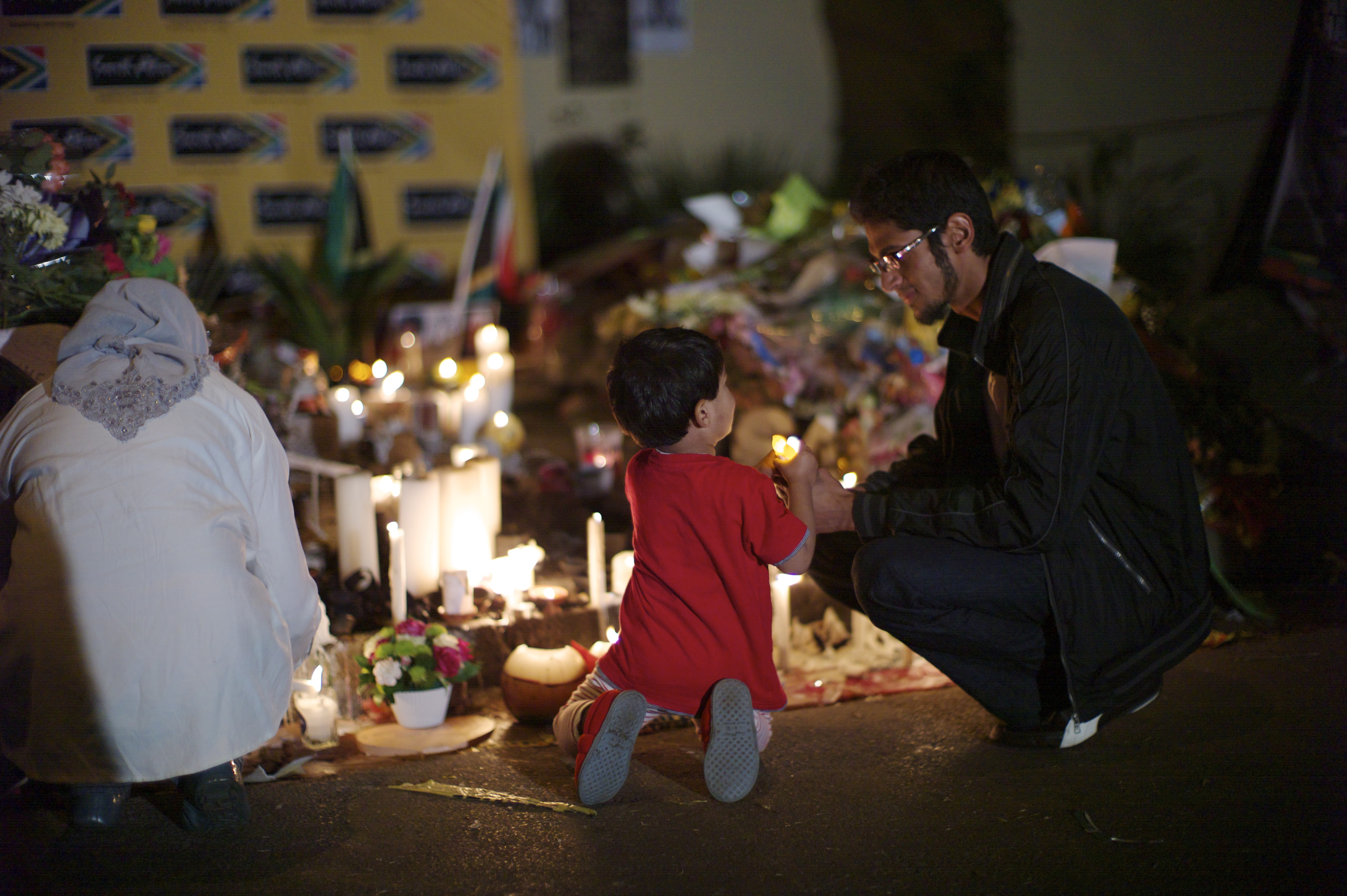
- Candlelight vigil outside Mandela's home
- Date: 5 December 2013; 12 years ago
- Location: Durban, KwaZulu-Natal (memorial service); Pretoria, Gauteng (public viewing); Qunu, Eastern Cape (state funeral and burial)
- Website: www.mandela.gov.za

On 5 December 2013, Nelson Mandela, the first president of South Africa to be elected in a fully representative democratic election, as well as the country's first black head of state, died at the age of 95 after a prolonged respiratory infection. He died at around 20:50 local time (UTC+2) at his home in Houghton, Johannesburg, surrounded by family. His death was announced by President Jacob Zuma on national television at 23:45. Reactions from governments, international organisations, and notable individuals, gained worldwide media coverage.

South Africa observed a national mourning period of 10 days. During this time numerous memorial services were conducted across the country. The official memorial service was held at FNB Stadium, Johannesburg, on 10 December where the 95,000-seat stadium was two-thirds full because of the cold, rain, and transport challenges. Mandela's body lay in state at the Union Buildings in Pretoria from 11 to 13 December. A state funeral was held on 15 December in Qunu in the Eastern Cape, where his body was buried.

== Official funeral events ==
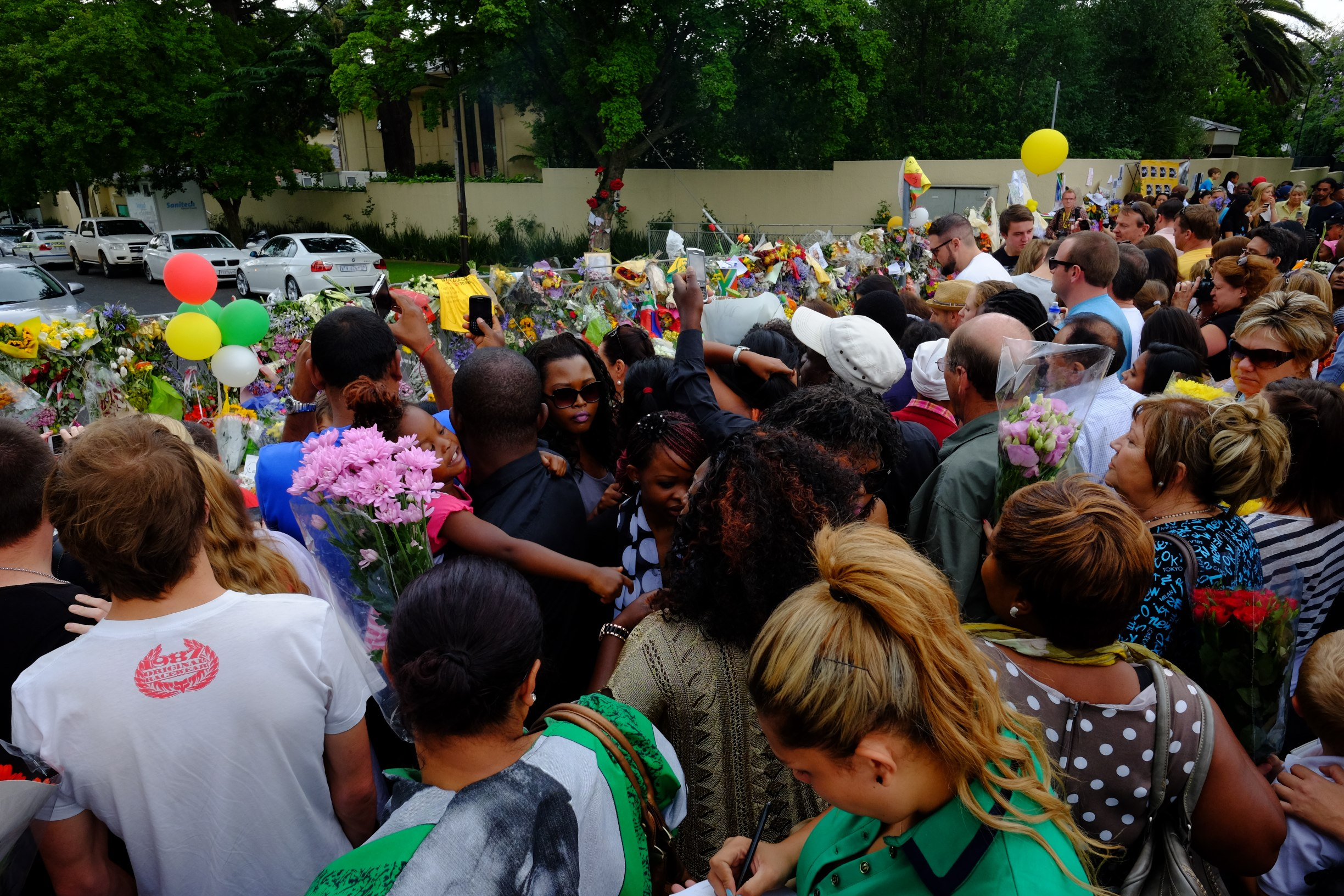
Members of the public paying their respects outside Mandela's Houghton home.

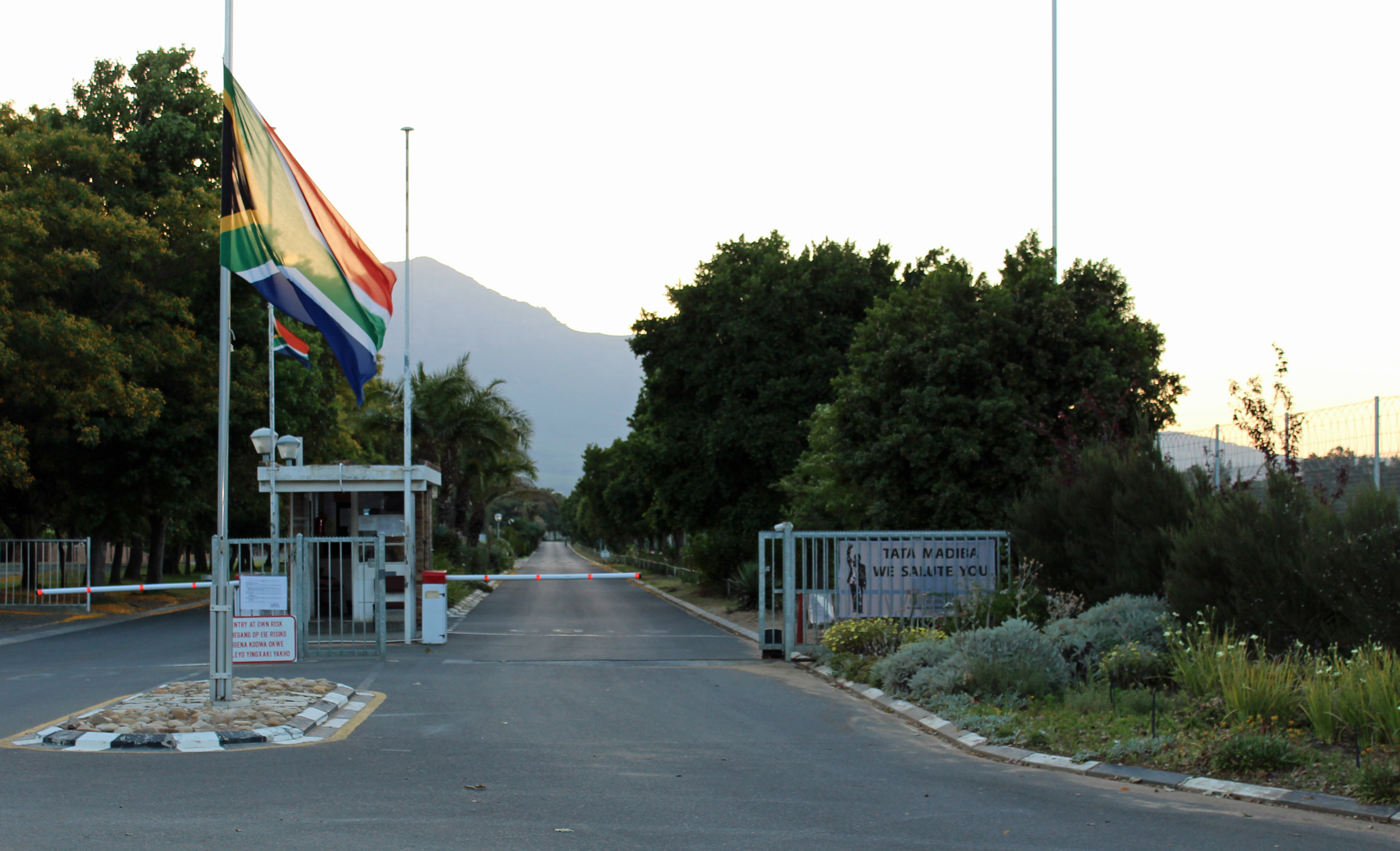
South African flag flying half-mast outside Drakenstein Correctional Centre where Mandela was imprisoned from 1988 to his release in 1990.

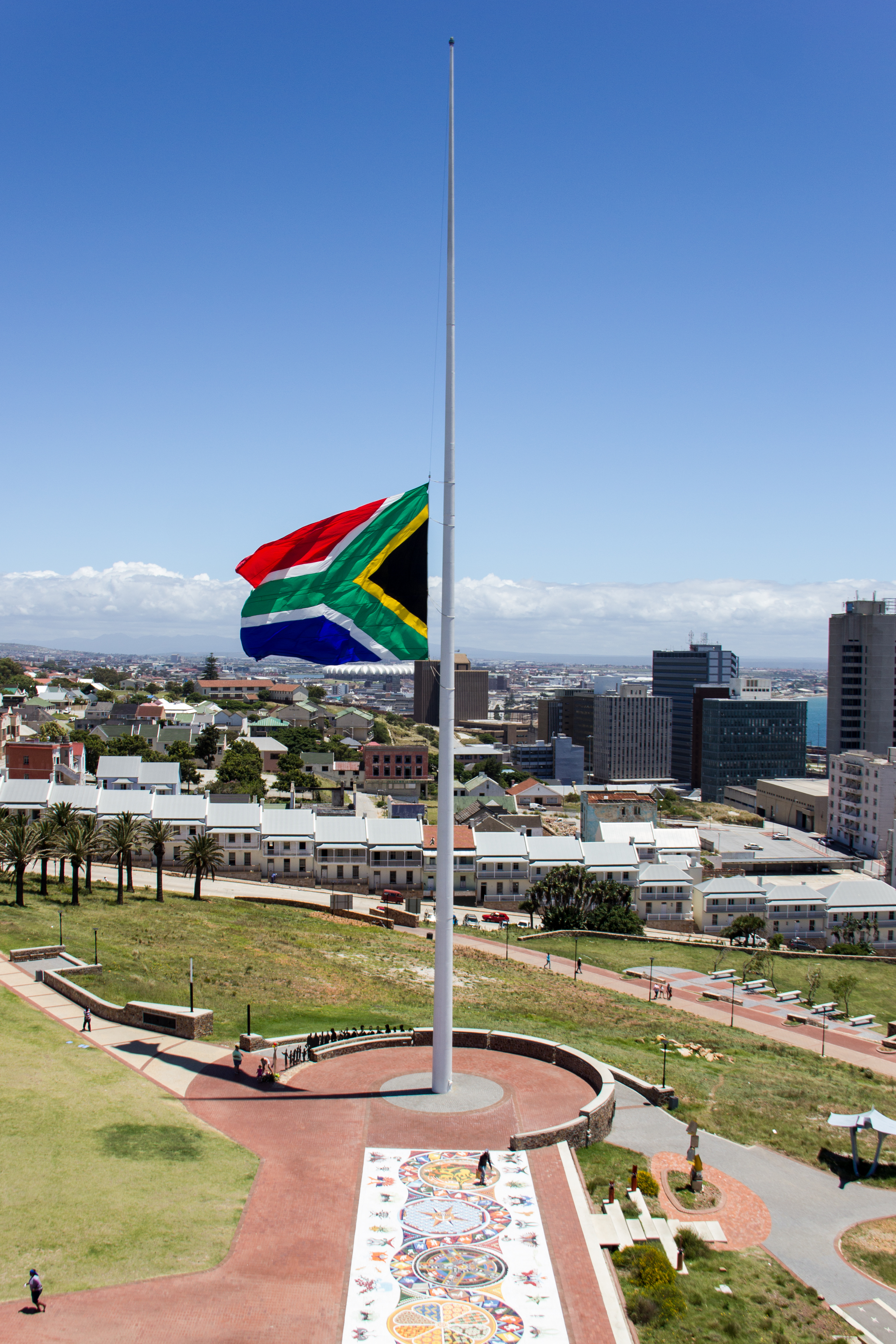
The largest South African flag flying half-mast at the Donkin Reserve, Port Elizabeth.

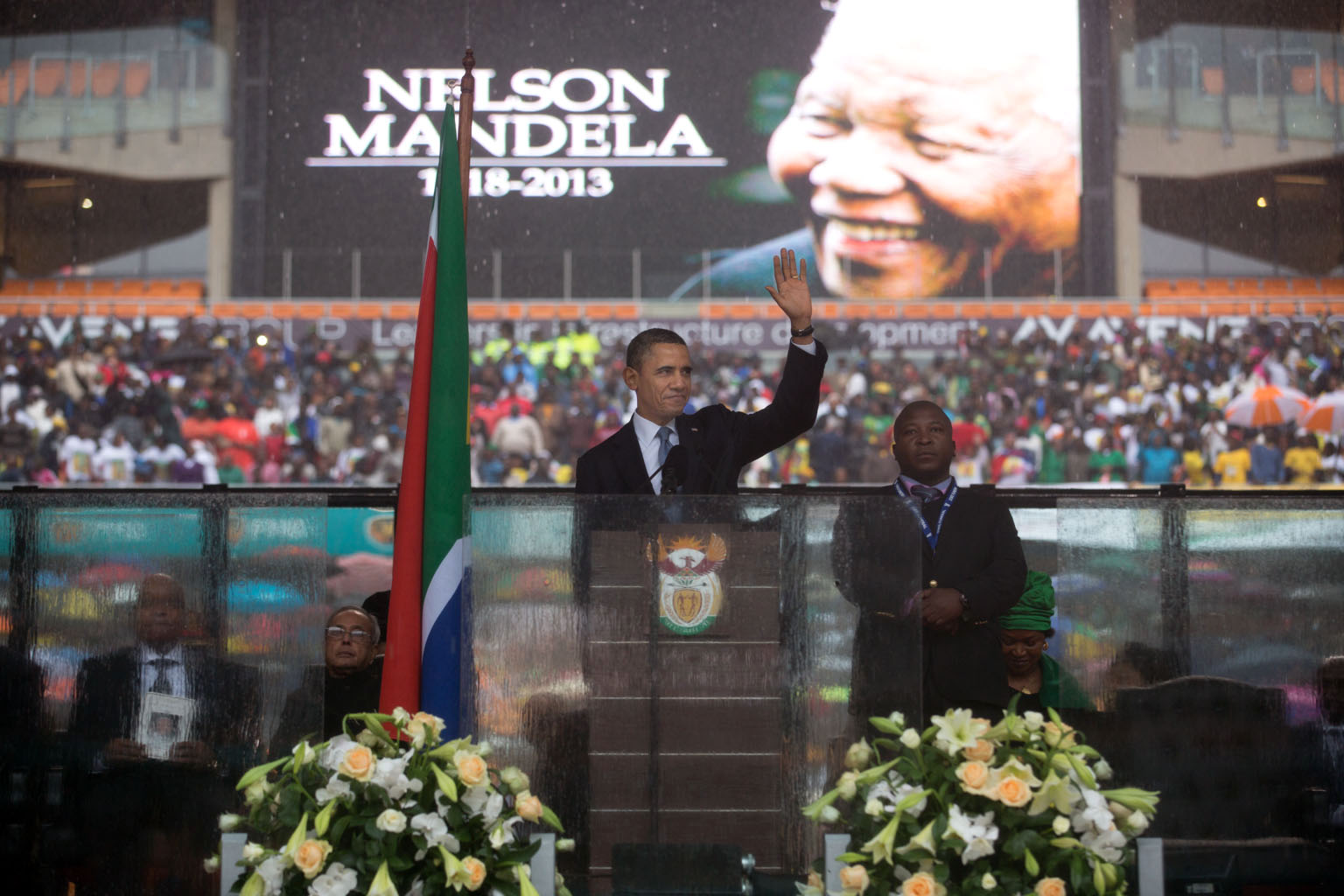
US President Barack Obama delivering his speech at Mandela's state memorial service.

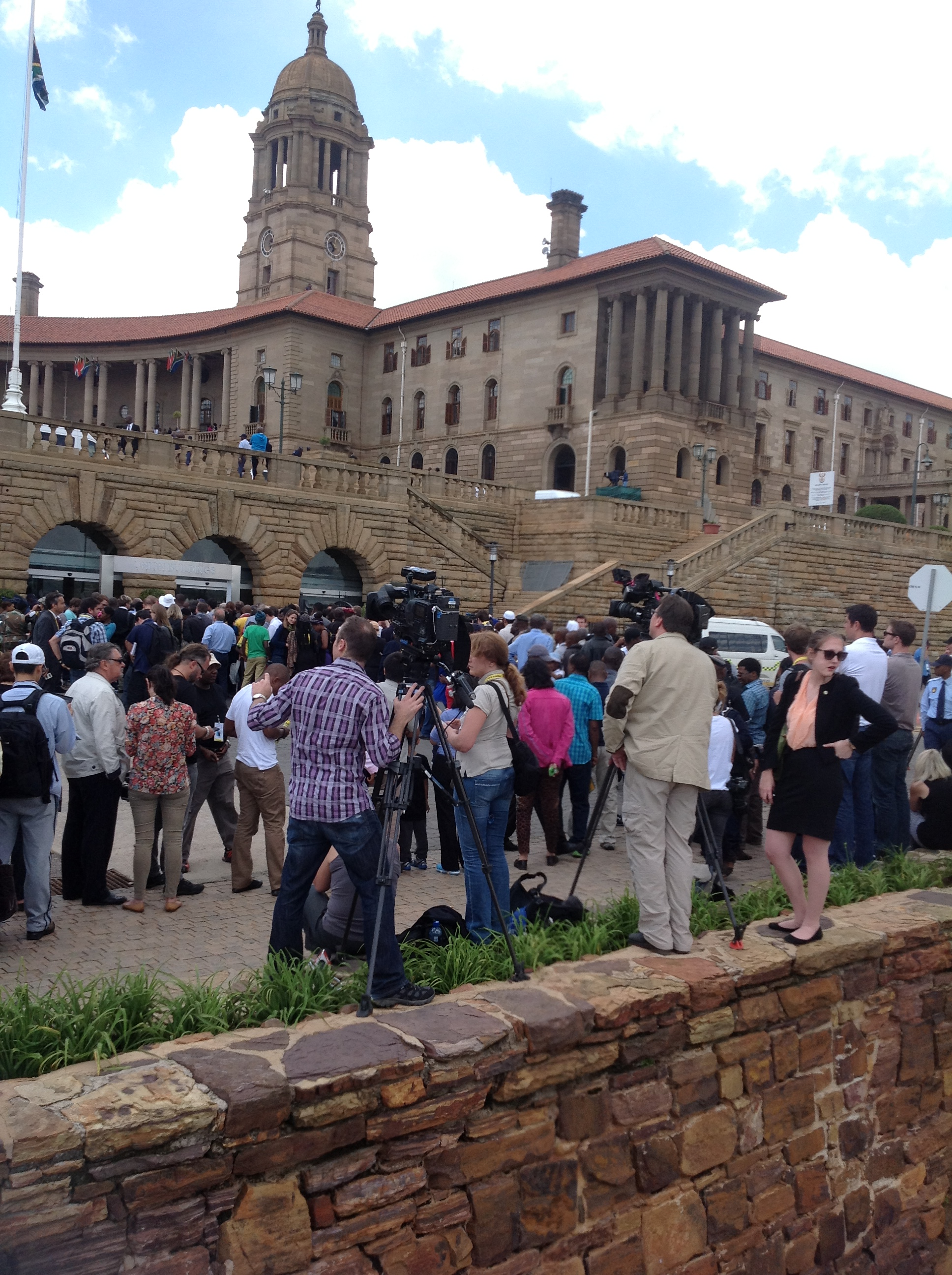
Members of the public queueing to view Mandela's body at the Union Buildings.

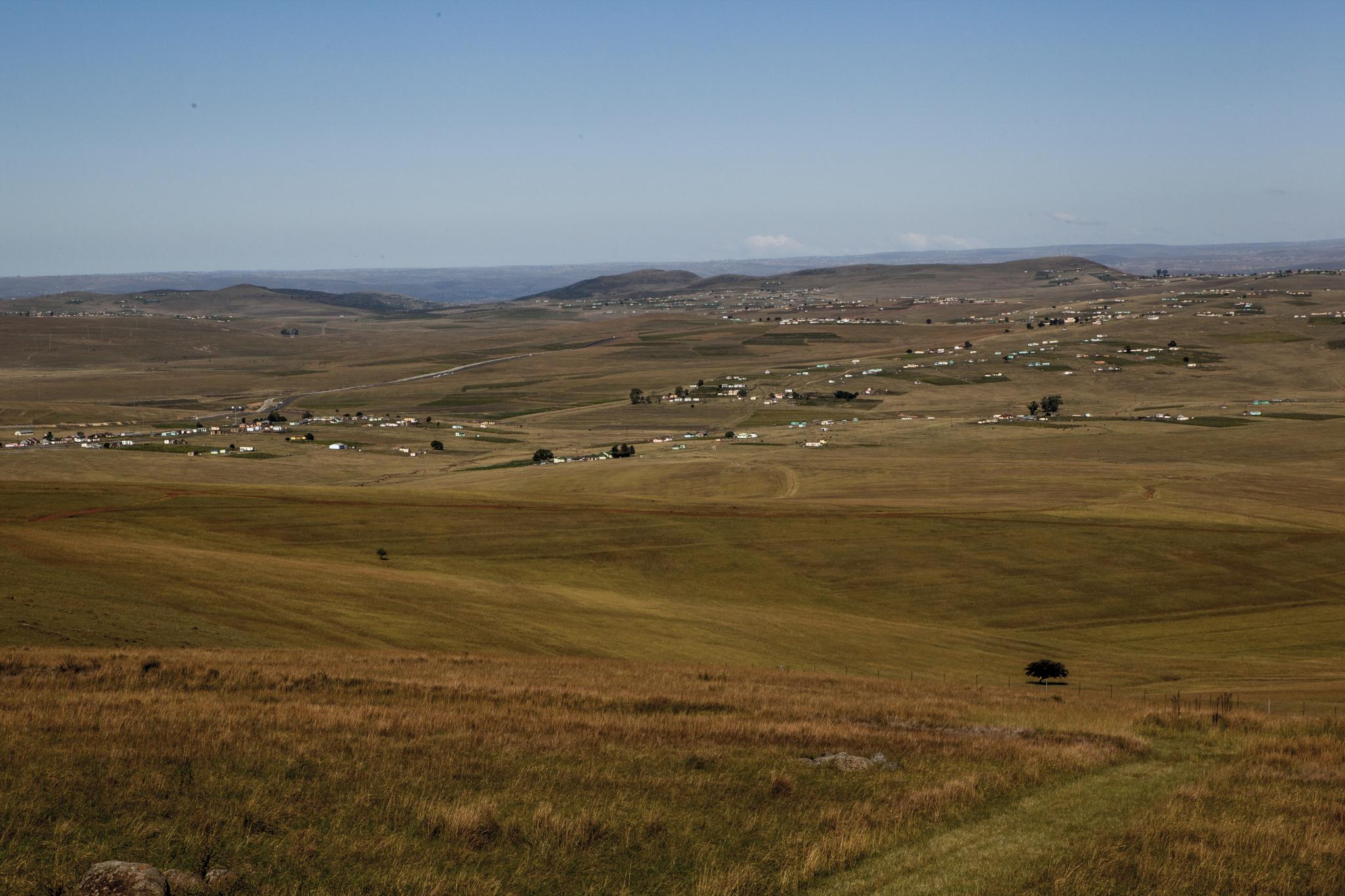
Qunu village in the Eastern Cape, where Mandela's funeral was held on 15 December 2013.

The South African government announced a period of 10 days of national mourning ending with the state funeral on 15 December 2013. President Jacob Zuma ordered that all flags on government buildings be flown at half-mast for the duration of the mourning period.

On 9 December the government confirmed that at least 91 foreign heads of state and government and 15 former leaders would travel to South Africa to attend funeral events. African heads of state and government confirmed to be attending included the Prime Minister of Lesotho, the President of Mozambique, the President of Namibia, the President of Niger, the President of Nigeria, the Prime Minister of Swaziland, the President of Tanzania, the Prime Minister of Lebanon, the President of Namibia, the President of Tunisia, the President of Uganda, the President of Zimbabwe, and the President of Zambia. Nkosazana Dlamini-Zuma attended in her capacity as Chairperson of the African Union Commission.

Other notable guests included:

- Heads of State or of Government: the President of the United States and three former presidents of the United States; the President of India; the Prime Minister of Italy; the Vice President of China; the Chairwoman of the Federation Council of Russia; the President of Brazil; the President of Finland; the President of France; the Prime Minister of Denmark; the President of Ireland; the President of Portugal; the Prime Minister of the United Kingdom; the President of Germany and Chancellor of Germany; the Prime Minister of Australia; two former Governors General of Canada, the Prime Minister of Canada, and four former Prime Ministers of Canada; the Prime Minister of Jamaica; the Prime Minister of Jordan; and the President of Afghanistan.
- Royal dignitaries included: the King of the Netherlands, the King of Belgium, the Prince of Wales, the Prince of Asturias, the Crown Prince of Denmark, the Crown Princess of Sweden, the Crown Prince of Norway, the Crown Prince of Japan, and the Queen of Jordan.
- Multilateral leaders include: the Secretary-General of the United Nations, the Commonwealth Secretary General, the President of the European Commission and representatives from other organisations such as the IMF and the World Bank Group.

=== Day of prayer and reflection ===
The South African government declared Sunday, 8 December 2013 to be observed as a national day of prayer and reflection.

We call upon all our people to gather in halls, churches, mosques, temples, synagogues and in their homes for prayer services and meditation, reflecting on the life of Madiba and his contribution to our country and the world.

— Jacob Zuma, 6 December 2013

=== State memorial service ===
The official memorial service was held at FNB Stadium in Johannesburg on Tuesday, 10 December 2013 commencing at 11:00 local time (UTC+2). More than 91 heads of state and government, at least 30 retired presidents, approximately 90 governmental representatives and delegates, leaders of 20 international organisations, and dozens of celebrities and businessman were expected to attend this service. In total, about 170 countries were represented in the event.

==== Sign language interpretation ====
In what was characterised as a national embarrassment, during the memorial service it became evident that the official sign language interpreter, Thamsanqa Jantjie, was a fake. DeafSA, a South African association for the deaf, stated that Jantjie had made a "mockery of South African sign language" and that the "deaf community was in outrage". Jantjie, who stood on the memorial stage alongside world leaders throughout the event, made meaningless hand gestures that did not reflect established signs. How Jantjie had obtained the job and received security clearance raised questions about bureaucratic mismanagement.

On 12 December, Jantjie apologised if he had offended anyone, explaining that his performance was impaired due to a hallucination brought on by his schizophrenia. He added that he suffers from violent tendencies and stated that he had been hospitalised in a mental health facility for 19 months, beginning around 2006. Nonetheless, he maintained that he performed well, calling himself "a champion of sign language".

The same day, Deputy Minister for Women, Children and People with Disabilities Hendrietta Bogopane-Zulu admitted, "In the process, and in the speed of the event, a mistake happened." However, she rejected the view that Jantjie was a fraud, stating, "we should not say that he is a fake interpreter because he does have a basic sign language translation qualification. He started off very well and got tired in the process ... [H]e has interpreted to deaf people in court before and is able to communicate with his deaf friends very well. It's just that (on that day) he did not sign what was expected of him." The South African news broadcaster eNCA alleged that between 1994 and 2003 Jantjie had been charged, but not sentenced, for various crimes ranging from rape and housebreaking to attempted murder and kidnapping. According to the report he was sentenced to three years in prison for theft but other charges had been dropped as he had been judged mentally unfit to stand trial.

==== Booing of President Jacob Zuma ====
South African President Jacob Zuma was booed and jeered by some in the crowd, though other sections cheered him. The booing faded when Zuma addressed the crowd. The negative reaction reportedly stemmed from public anger over corruption scandals that had tainted Zuma and his government. The ANC leadership at the time was viewed as not living up to Mandela's legacy.

==== Obama–Castro handshake ====
United States President Barack Obama shook hands with Cuban leader Raúl Castro, the first such encounter between sitting U.S. and Cuban heads of government since Bill Clinton and Fidel Castro shook hands at the U.N. in 2000. The gesture prompted criticism from Republican politicians in Washington. Congresswoman Ileana Ros-Lehtinen, a Cuban-American opponent of the Castro government, said: "Sometimes a handshake is just a handshake, but when the leader of the free world shakes the bloody hand of a ruthless dictator like Raul Castro, it becomes a propaganda coup for the tyrant." Senator John McCain compared the Obama–Castro handshake to British Prime Minister Neville Chamberlain's handshake with Adolf Hitler when the two were in the process of negotiating the Munich Agreement in 1938 saying, "Neville Chamberlain shook hands with Hitler. It gives Raul some propaganda to continue to prop up his dictatorial, brutal regime, that's all". The Cuban government welcomed the gesture. The White House said it had been unplanned.

==== Obama–Thorning-Schmidt–Cameron selfie ====
Along with Obama, Prime Minister of Denmark Helle Thorning-Schmidt and Prime Minister of the United Kingdom David Cameron faced criticism on social media that they had behaved inappropriately after posing for a "selfie" which was taken using Thorning-Schmidt's mobile phone. Defending her actions, Thorning-Schmidt said, "There were lots of pictures taken that day, and I just thought it was a bit fun. Maybe it also shows that when we meet heads of state and government, we too are just people who have fun." Cameron said he was being polite when Thorning-Schmidt asked him to take part in the picture.

=== Lying in state ===
Mandela's body lay in state at the Union Buildings in Pretoria from 11 to 13 December 2013. Approximately 100,000 mourners viewed Mandela's body over the three days. The crowds grew larger each day and thousands who queued on the final day could not be accommodated and were turned away. Nelson Mandela's grandson, Mandla Mandela, remained with his grandfather's body for all three days, in accordance with AbaThembu tradition, which requires an adult male family member to remain with the body until burial.

=== State funeral in Qunu ===
The state funeral was held on 15 December 2013 in Qunu in the Eastern Cape. The ceremony was held in a large tent in Qunu erected for the event and attended by about 4,500 people, including 8 heads of state and many foreign dignitaries. The ceremony was televised on South African television up until the lowering of Mandela's casket and burial, when the filming and broadcast was stopped at the advance request of the Mandela family. The ceremony was shown on big screens set up in public viewing spaces around the area. The burial part of the funeral programme was attended by 450 selected people, including relatives and chosen dignitaries. Shortly before the burial, Nelson Mandela was given a 21 gun salute and a missing man formation flyover by fighter jets.

== Other memorial activities ==
=== South Africa ===
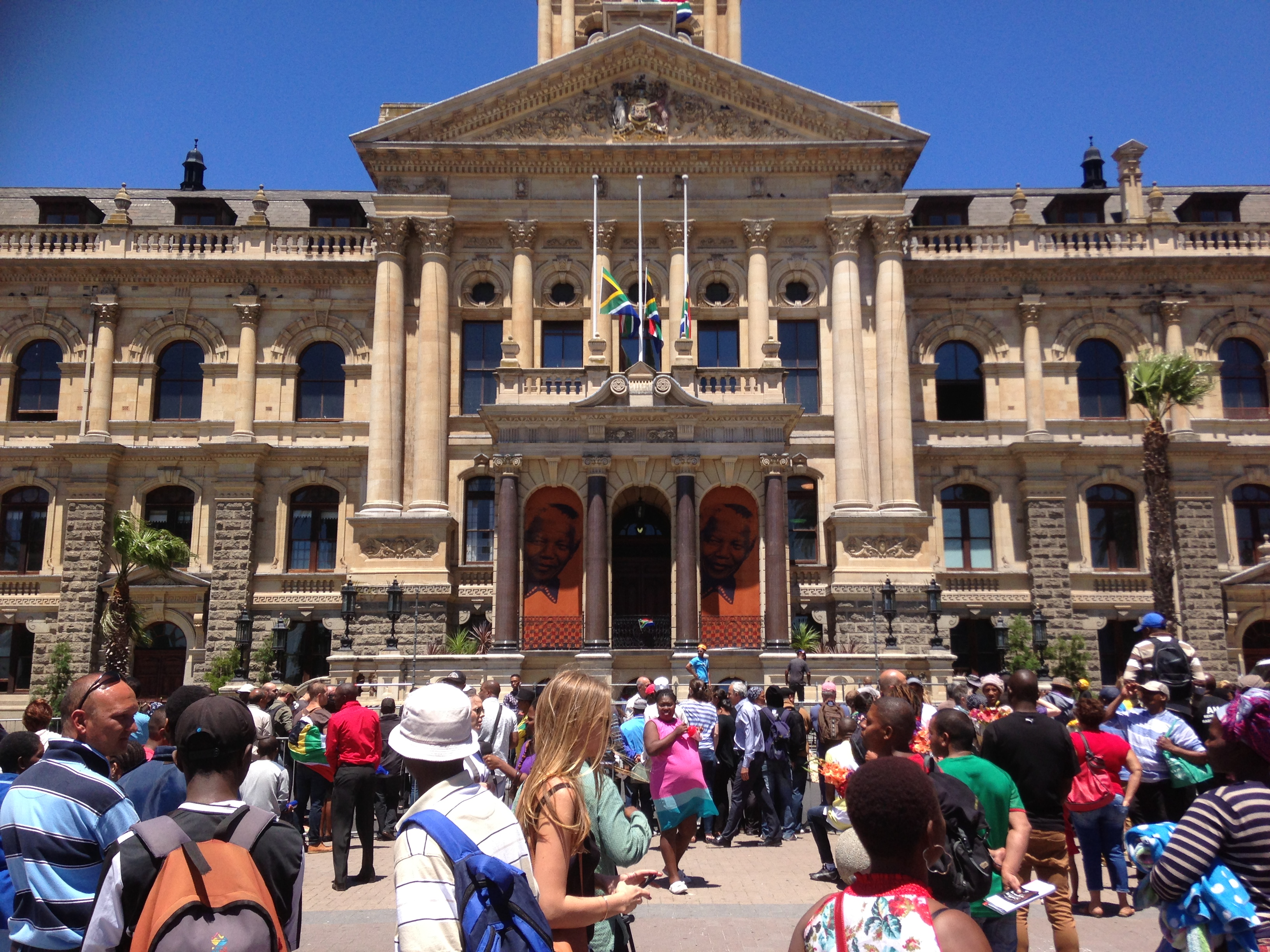
A crowd gathers at the Grand Parade in front of the Cape Town City Hall the day after Mandela's death. Mandela made his first public speech here after being released from prison in 1990 and following his death the area was designated as the city's primary public mourning space.

The Mayor of Cape Town, Patricia de Lille, announced that the city would host an interfaith service on the Grand Parade, which has been designated as Cape Town's primary public mourning space, on Sunday, 8 December 2013. A public night vigil was held there on the evening before Mandela's funeral. Cape Town also hosted a free tribute concert at the Cape Town Stadium on Wednesday, 11 December 2013.

=== Foreign states ===
A memorial service in honour of Mandela was held on 11 December 2013 in Abu Dhabi.

A thanksgiving service was held at Westminster Abbey in March 2014, and a memorial stone was laid in the Abbey on the centenary of his birth in 2018.

A memorial service in honour of Mandela was held on 11 December 2013 at Washington National Cathedral in Washington, D.C.

== Reactions ==
=== South Africa ===
==== Politicians ====
- Jacob Zuma, President of South Africa said: "Our nation has lost its greatest son. Our people have lost a father. Although we knew that this day would come, nothing can reduce the sense of our profound loss."
- F. W. de Klerk, Mandela's predecessor as president of South Africa, said: "He was a great unifier and a very, very special man in this regard beyond everything else he did. This emphasis on reconciliation was his biggest legacy."
- Helen Zille, then premier of the Western Cape, said: "We all belong to the South African family—and we owe that sense of belonging to Madiba. That is his legacy."
- Kgalema Motlanthe, then Deputy President of South Africa, said: "The world over, his name has evolved into a metaphor," He said: "The name Nelson Mandela has entered the pantheon of history's sages."

==== Political parties ====
- Kenneth Meshoe, leader of the African Christian Democratic Party, said: "After 27 years in prison, he could have wanted revenge. But no, because he was a visionary and wise man he said to his friends 'No, let us preach reconciliation'".
- Mamphela Ramphele, leader of Agang South Africa, said: "Madiba symbolised the exemplary values that all good people the world over hold dear – integrity, commitment to equality and the well-being of all people irrespective of race, faith, geographic location or position."
- A week after Mandela's death, Julius Malema, leader of the Economic Freedom Fighters led a crowd of EFF members to Mandela's Houghton home to pay tribute to the late statesman. He said: "Thank you for ushering in political freedom... Those who came after you failed to deliver economic freedom." He shouted: "Viva the militant Nelson Mandela, viva." EFF members then laid red roses on a wall of tributes near Mandela's house.
- Pieter Mulder, leader of the Freedom Front Plus, released a statement conveying his condolences to Mandela's wife, Graça Machel and saying: "It is given to few men to live out their dreams in their lifetime. Nelson Mandela succeeded in doing this. Against the most colossal odds, he had realized the vision he had as a young man."

==== Other commentators ====
- Archbishop Emeritus Desmond Tutu said in an email: "He transcended race and class in his personal actions, through his warmth and through his willingness to listen and to empathize with others, ...and he restored others' faith in Africa and Africans."
- Anti-Apartheid activist and mother of former president Thabo Mbeki, Epainette Mbeki said: "He's not dead, he's asleep." She said South Africans should celebrate his life.
- Noted human rights lawyer and Mandela's lawyer at the Rivonia trial, George Bizos said: "He will go down in history forever as the one person who set an example that fundamental differences between people can be solved without violence."
- Archbishop Thabo Makgoba said, on the day of prayer and reflection for Nelson Mandela: "Through his example, he has set the standard for service to country and mankind worldwide, whether we are individual citizens, cabinet ministers or presidents, and continues to call on us all to better serve our fellow human beings and contribute to the betterment of our communities,"

==== Institutional reactions ====
- Since the initial announcement, all three television channels of the public broadcaster, the South African Broadcasting Corporation, replaced their normal scheduled programming and advertising with continuous news and tribute programming. Satellite television broadcaster MultiChoice opened a dedicated special event channel for news and tribute programming.
- A special joint sitting of both houses of Parliament in honour of Mandela was held on Monday 9 December.
- Following the announcement of Mandela's death, South African cinemas stopped the screening of Mandela: Long Walk to Freedom for 24 hours.

=== Supranational organisations ===
- African Union: Commission chairperson and South African, Nkosazana Dlamini-Zuma said: "Mandela has fought a good fight, and bowed out with great reverence". AU flags were ordered fly at half-mast.
- European Union: Foreign policy chief Catherine Ashton said: "more than anyone else, Nelson Mandela inspired my generation and our world."
- FIFA: President Sepp Blatter ordered flags to fly at half mast and a minute's silence to be observed at the next round of international football matches. He said: "Nelson Mandela will stay in our hearts forever. The memories of his remarkable fight against oppression, his incredible charisma and his positive values will live on in us and with us."
- IAAF: International Association of Athletics Federations President Lamine Diack said: "In spite of the long-lasting and uncompromising fight he had had to put up in order to rid his country of apartheid and injustice, he was also able to rise high above personal resentment to champion the cause of peace and unity which proved to be instrumental in the construction of the South African rainbow nation."
- International Cricket Council: President Alan Isaac said in a statement: "Nelson Mandela was a towering symbol of resistance, a leader, an activist, and a man who recognised the power of sport to inspire and bring people together."
- International Rugby Board: Chairman Bernard Lapasset said: "I am so proud that the Rugby family could play its small part in supporting Mr Mandela's efforts to establish the new South Africa and that our tournament came to symbolise the emergence of a new nation. He changed the world and we were privileged to witness and embrace his work."
- IOC: The International Olympic Committee flew its flag at half-mast for three days. IOC President Thomas Bach said: "The Olympic Movement is mourning the loss of a great friend and a hero of humanity." and "However, his attitude towards sport can make us proud – proud at his understanding of the potential of sport to bring inclusion."
- Elizabeth II Queen of the Commonwealth realms, Head of the Commonwealth, former Queen of South Africa said she was "deeply saddened" to learn of Nelson Mandela's death and has sent her "sincere condolences to his family and to the people of South Africa", commenting that Nelson Mandela "worked tirelessly for the good of his country, and his legacy is the peaceful South Africa we see today". Commonwealth of Nations Secretary General Kamalesh Sharma said: "Nelson Mandela was an inspirational Commonwealth leader of the twentieth century. He was a titan of our age. He became the embodiment of nobility and reconciliation in politics and statesmanship. His significance as an exemplar to the world of ethical political engagement will stand for posterity." He also conveyed his condolences to the Mandela family.
- UNASUR: The Union of South American States expressed its condolences with the people of South Africa and remembered Mandela as a "visionary leader" and as an icon of World peace.
- United Nations: Secretary-General Ban Ki-moon said: "Nelson Mandela was a singular figure on the global stage — a man of quiet dignity and towering achievement, a giant for justice and a down-to-earth human inspiration." The Security Council interrupted their meeting to observe a minute's silence when they received the news.
- NATO: North Atlantic Treaty Organization Secretary General Anders Fogh Rasmussen conveyed his condolences to the people of South Africa and the family of Nelson Mandela, he said: "Nelson Mandela was a man of peace and a truly inspirational figure. He was a symbol of freedom, dignity and reconciliation to millions of people, irrespective of race. His death is a loss to us all, but he leaves a lasting legacy to the whole world."

=== UN Member States and Observers ===
==== Africa ====
- Algeria: President of Algeria Abdelaziz Bouteflika expressed condolences to President Zuma and the South African people through a message, writing: "On behalf of the people and the government of Algeria and in my own name, I convey my deep and sincere condolences and my deepest sympathy to the South African people, the family of the illustrious deceased and to you, Mr. President and dear brother... Nelson Mandela merges with the history of South Africa... The best tribute we can pay to Nelson Mandela is to continue the solidarity action toward the African renaissance." President Bouteflika also called for national flags to be lowered to half mast for an eight-day period of mourning.
- Botswana: The President of Botswana offered condolences to the Government and people of South Africa, as well as to Graça Machel and the entire Mandela family, on the death of Mandela. President Seretse Khama Ian Khama said that Mandela's "consummate belief and steadfast commitment to the fundamental principles of liberty, justice and equality was immense" and that "his strong moral standing and deep intolerance for human suffering of any kind, was and will, continue to be inspirational."
- Egypt: The interim presidency of Egypt mourned Nelson Mandela announcing three days of national mourning and made a statement saying that he "will remain in the hearts and minds of Egyptians as one of the most notable symbols of nationalist struggle in our contemporary world," saying the former South African president had "close historical connections with Egypt through his struggle for noble human values, embodied in his struggle against racial discrimination." It has also stated that Mandela, along with former Egyptian president Gamal Abdel Nasser and other "founding fathers of Africa's struggle for freedom and independence, will remain a source of inspiration for nations." Ahmed El-Muslimani, media advisor to interim Egyptian President Adly Mansour, hailed Mandela as a symbol of freedom and said on Friday that Egypt and the African continent will remember Nelson Mandela with pride and honour, describing his death as "bad news for the whole world." In addition, Foreign Minister Nabil Fahmy said in a statement that the role of Mandela went beyond the borders of South Africa and that his struggle was a source of pride for the whole world not only due to his fight against apartheid but also for his calls for promoting the principles of reconciliation.
- Gabon: President Ali Bongo Ondimba expressed condolences on behalf of the Gabonese people and through a statement, wrote that "it now falls to us to continue his work and celebrate his life. I therefore invite all Gabonese people to take a moment of contemplation and join hands in a show of compassion fitting of such a circumstance." Seven days of national mourning was observed.
- Ghana: President John Dramani Mahama penned an op-ed in The New York Times, while including in a statement that Mandela's "utilisation of peace as a vehicle of liberation showed Africa that if we were to move beyond the divisiveness caused by colonisation, and the pain of our self-inflicted wounds, compassion and forgiveness must play a role in governance."
- Guinea: President Alpha Condé declared three days of national mourning and expressed his admiration for Mandela by saying, "He is comparable to a great baobab, this invincible tree under which everyone shelters. And when this baobab falls, we find ourselves exposed."
- Kenya: President Uhuru Kenyatta ordered flags to be flown at half-staff and declared three days of national mourning, saying that "as a free man, President Mandela led the fight to free Africa not only from political bondage but equally important from the scourge of disease, poverty, poor governance and illiteracy — ills of modern life."
- Malawi: President Joyce Banda described Mandela's death as a loss to South Africa and the world, saying that all Africans "have drawn inspiration from Madiba", and expressed her appreciation for having been able to recently meet him and declared three days of national mourning.
- Mauritius: Prime Minister Navin Ramgoolam stated that Mandela was a man "whose name will remain for ever in the conscience of humanity. He was a symbol of reconciliation and of humility," and stated that "Nelson Mandela was Africa's Mahatma Gandhi." Mauritius would observe a national day of mourning on Sunday 15 December in honor of former South African president Nelson Mandela, according to the government.
- Morocco: King Mohammed VI expressed condolences to Graça Machel and President Jacob Zuma and stated that Mandela "had established a particular relationship with Morocco which supported him since the first years of his struggle against apartheid".
- Namibia: President Hifikepunye Pohamba paid tribute at the South African High Commission in Windhoek, writing that "a giant has gone to rest. The icon of the anti-apartheid struggle has departed after accomplishing what he stood for. Comrade Madiba will be missed not only by those who knew him and by the people of South Africa who he loved and cared for so deeply and sacrificed for but by all those who believe in human dignity." He also recognised Mandela's unshakable bond with the people of Namibia and their admiration of him, and declared three days of national mourning.
- Nigeria: President Goodluck Jonathan expressed condolences and noted that Mandela "will always be remembered and honoured by all mankind as one of its greatest liberators, a wise, courageous and compassionate leader, and an icon of true democracy", and declared three days of national mourning.
- Rwanda: President Paul Kagame declared six days of mourning and said that "he will continue to live in the hearts of many of us"; before starting the National Dialogue Council (Umushyikirano), at Parliament a minute of silence was observed.
- Senegal: President Macky Sall expressed sadness over the death and remarked that "we have lost a giant, one of the greatest figures in contemporary Africa. No man of our time has given so much for the cause of his people, for Africa, and for the good of mankind. Mandela taught us courage, strength, forgiveness and declared three days of national mourning"
- Somalia: President Hassan Sheikh Mohamud expressed condolences and said "Nelson Mandela impacted the lives of people in every corner of the world."
- Sudan: President Omar al-Bashir expressed sorrow and extended sincere condolences to President Jacob Zuma and the South African people on the death of Nelson Mandela. He considered him a "symbol of dignity and struggle for people's freedom and resistance of colonisation and exploitation of Africans", pointing to Sudan's acclaimed role in supporting African liberation movements and African leaders who led the struggle against colonisation and on top of whom was the late Mandela.
- Swaziland: King Mswati III described Mandela as "a person and leader of outstanding wisdom, moral and spiritual stature".
- Tanzania: President Jakaya Kikwete announced three days of national mourning and expressed how "Mandela is a good example to how humankind is supposed to live."
- Zambia: President Michael Sata expressed condolences to the Mandela family and the people of South Africa, while writing that "we also pray that the Almighty God will grant the bereaved family His abundant mercies, solace and fortitude to bear this great loss of a true son of the African soil and declared seven days of mourning"
- Zimbabwe: President Robert Mugabe issued a statement conveying condolences, that included "Mr Nelson Mandela's renowned and illustrious political life will forever remain a beacon of excellence. Not only was he a great champion of the emancipation of the oppressed, but he also was a humble and compassionate leader who showed selfless dedication to the service of his people."

==== Asia ====
- Azerbaijan: President of Azerbaijan Ilham Aliyev sent a letter of condolence to South African President Jacob Zuma, which said: "I was deeply saddened by the death of the former President of RSA, the great son of the South African people, the outstanding statesman, the hero of struggle against apartheid and racism, the Nobel Prize laureate Nelson Mandela. With regard to this grave loss on my own behalf and on behalf of the people of Azerbaijan I express my deep condolences to You, the family of the deceased and the people of RSA". The flags at the UN office in Baku were lowered.
- Bangladesh: The Government of Bangladesh announced a three-day state mourning for the "anti-apartheid icon and global symbol of reconciliation and peaceful co-existence, Nelson Mandela". President Abdul Hamid said that Mandela will be remembered forever for his long struggle for the emancipation of the people. Prime Minister Sheikh Hasina joined the rest of the world in mourning the demise of the anti-apartheid leader.
- Brunei: Brunei Sultan Hassanal Bolkiah sent a message of condolence to South African President Jacob Zuma following the death of former President Nelson Mandela. In the message, the sultan said that "Mandela would be much missed not only by South Africans but also by a world that saw him as a beacon of hope and courage and as a moral force in international affairs". The sultan also remembered the visit of Mandela to Brunei Darussalam and stated that the people of Brunei joined His Majesty in expressing their deepest condolences to Zuma and to the government and people of South Africa, especially family members of the late Mandela.
- Cambodia: "An outstanding example in fighting for freedom and democracy," said Government spokesman Phay Siphan.
- China: President Xi Jinping sent his condolences, describing Mandela as "a world-renowned statesman," who "led the South African people through arduous struggles to the anti-apartheid victory". He continued, "The Chinese people will always remember Mandela's extraordinary contributions to the development of the China-South Africa ties and the cause of human progress." Chinese Premier Li Keqiang said "We mourn for his death. Also we send our condolences to the people of South Africa and Mr. Mandela's families and friends.".

- Hong Kong: Chief Executive CY Leung expressed his sadness at the death of Mandela. "We will remember Mr Mandela as a great man for his sacrifices, accomplishments and relentless quest for peace. On behalf of the Government and people of the Hong Kong, I express our profound sadness at the news of Nelson Mandela's death and our condolences to his family. Our thoughts and prayers are with the people of South Africa, including our South African community in Hong Kong, during this period of national mourning and reflection."

- East Timor: The nation of East Timor expresses its extreme sadness at the death of Nelson Mandela, Prime Minister Xanana Gusmão said in his condolence message that "Mandela contribution to freedom of his people will never be forgotten. His fearless pursuit of a non-racial and democratic South Africa – even when it seemed impossible – leaves our world with remarkable legacy. His optimism impacted me, personally, during my country's brutal occupation by Indonesia, and he indeed served as a moral compass for leaders across the world during the uncertainties and tragedies of the Cold War. In East Timor, Mandela was widely admired during our struggle for the restoration of our independence". The country also has declared a national mourning for three days beginning from 11 December.
- India: President Pranab Mukherjee said in his condolence message, that Mandela was a statesman, a world leader and an icon of inspiration for humanity. Prime Minister Manmohan Singh said, "a giant among men has passed away. This is as much India's loss as South Africa's. He was a true Gandhian. His life and work will remain a source of eternal inspiration for generations to come. I join all those who are praying for his soul." Vice President Hamid Ansari said "While his courage, determination and sacrifice inspired millions of people during the anti-apartheid movement, his message of peace, forgiveness and reconciliation thereafter, united them and led the rainbow nation on the path to peace and progress. In his death, South Africans have lost the father of their nation and the world a statesman, whose life and message of courage and goodness would continue to inspire and guide all of us around the world in the years ahead." India will observe a five-day State Mourning as a mark of respect for Mandela. A decision to this effect was taken at a special meeting of the Union Cabinet, which condoled the death of the anti-apartheid icon.
- Indonesia: President Susilo Bambang Yudhoyono expressed his condolences over the death of Nelson Mandela, and praised him for opposing apartheid in his country.
- Iran: President Hassan Rouhani wrote a letter to Jacob Zuma. "Unfortunately, I became aware that Mr. Mandela has passed away. He believed in human equality and freedom for people not only for African people, for all people around the world. for his holy goal, he sacrificed many things. He was jailed and banished. Doubtless he was a hero who after his success, connected his morality and his politics and he forgave those who had jailed. Today, we see people from different races trying to make South Africa. With much sadness, I give condolence to his family and his country and all who want make their world a better place to live.", said Hassan Rouhani.
- Israel: Prime Minister Benjamin Netanyahu referred to Mandela as "one of the most honorable figures of our time ... a man of vision, a freedom fighter who rejected violence."
- Japan: Prime Minister Shinzo Abe offered his condolences to the South African people and noted Mandela's friendly relations with Japan as well as expressing that "his noble spirit lives on in our hearts and will do so forever."
- Kazakhstan: President Nursultan Nazarbayev sent a telegram of condolences to President of South Africa Jacob Zuma: "President Nelson Mandela was a man of unyielding resolve who devoted his life to the fight against discrimination and apartheid, who built a new democratic state before the eyes of the world. He was a true inspiration to many to fight for their freedom, he infused hope into people's hearts. Mandela will be remembered as the symbol of national liberation movement and independence of the African people."
- Lebanon: President Michel Sleiman in an open letter to his South African counterpart paid tribute stating that Mandela "inspired the world with his path, fighting to eliminate racism and poverty to achieve equality and reconciliation among his people.", and declared December 10 a day of national mourning
- North Korea: Chairman of the Presidium of the Supreme People's Assembly Kim Yong-nam expressed condolences on behalf of Supreme Leader Kim Jong-un, and praised Mandela's "struggle against racism and for democracy".
- South Korea: In the official statement from Cheong Wa Dae, President Park Geun-hye offered her "deepest sympathy" to Mandela's family and the people of South Africa upon "a passing of a great statesman who put a peaceful end to apartheid and established social justice and democracy in South Africa", and stated that Mandela's "great causes will be carried on by people all around the world" while "praying for the eternal peace of his soul".
- Malaysia: Prime Minister Najib Razak on Twitter said that "Mandela lives on in the spirit of every human that believes in democracy and freedom. Thank you for your legacy, Madiba".
- Pakistan: President Mamnoon Hussain and Prime Minister Nawaz Sharif expressed their deep sorrow and grief over the sad demise and said, "Nelson Mandela's struggle against discriminatory attitudes in the society is respected worldwide."
- Palestine: President of the Palestinian National Authority Mahmoud Abbas mourned Nelson Mandela and paid tribute to his commitment to the Palestinian people's cause. The Palestinian Authority declared Friday a one day mourning period and ordered flags flown at half mast. He also described him as the "most courageous and important of those who supported us" and that "the name Mandela will stay forever with Palestine and with all Palestinians". "This is a great loss for all the peoples of the world, and for Palestine," Abbas said, hailing a "symbol of freedom from colonialism and occupation". He also added that the Palestinian people will never forget his historic statement that the South African revolution will not have achieved its goals as long as the Palestinians are not free.
- Philippines: President Benigno Aquino III said "On a more personal note, I recall with gratitude and humility the kind words he told me during his visit to the Philippines when I was still a Representative. He told me then, 'You chose your parents well. My mother admired him; like all of us, she would have been deeply saddened by his passing'. On behalf of the entire Filipino people, I extend our deepest condolences to the family of Mr. Mandela, the people of South Africa, and all men and women of peace and goodwill who mourn the passing of a truly great man."
- Singapore: Prime Minister Lee Hsien Loong expressed his condolences on Mandela's death. He wrote on Facebook and Twitter, "Rest in peace #Mandela. You inspired millions with your humanity, courage, and lifelong fight for freedom." Emeritus Senior Minister Goh Chok Tong also paid tribute, saying he was "saddened by the passing of a wise leader and a great human being".
- Syria: President Bashar al-Assad called Mandela's life an inspiration to real freedom fighters and a lesson to all tyrants. The presidency released a statement on its Facebook page calling Mandela an "inspiration in the values of love and human brotherhood". "His history of struggle has become an inspiration to all the vulnerable peoples of the world, in the expectation that oppressors and aggressors will learn the lesson that in the end it is they who are the losers," the statement said.
- Thailand: King Bhumibol Adulyadej sent a letter to the president of South Africa, saying "it is with profound sadness that the Queen and I learnt of the demise of His Excellency Mr. Nelson Mandela, Former President of the Republic of South Africa. We wish to extend to your Excellency and the members of the bereaved family as well as the people of the Republic of South Africa our heart felt sympathies and condolences for his enduring contribution to peace in his beloved country and beyond."
- Turkey: Turkish President Abdullah Gül said Mandela was a great figure and a great man not only as a statesman but even before that as a defender of human rights. He brought an end to racism through the struggle he staged in his own country. His loss is deeply saddening.
- Turkmenistan: President Gurbanguly Berdimuhamedow sent a telegram of condolences to the president of South Africa: "Nelson Mandela not only in his motherland but also abroad is an excellent example of courage and caring for the whole of humanity. I am sure that fond memories of him forever remain in the hearts of today's and future generations." The Turkmen leader expressed the words of support to all the Mandela family and to all the people of South Africa.
- Vietnam: President Trương Tấn Sang conveyed sympathy over the death of Mandela, the former chairman of the African National Congress (ANC) and former South African President.

==== Europe and European overseas territories ====
- Albania: Albanian President Bujar Nishani issued the following statement: "I was immensely saddened when I learnt about Nelson Mandela passing away. Humanity, with this loss, is bidding farewell to one of the most distinguished moral leaders and to an icon of resistance and the fight for justice and human dignity. Mandela never knelt in his fight against Apartheid, not even when he was deprived of freedom for 27 years. The long years of suffering neither weakened Mandela, nor killed his spirit. On the contrary, they filled him with the desire for reconciliation and understanding among people. He and his dream triumphed. His vision and kindness saved the South African people from suffering and hardships. Nelson Mandela with his unstoppable run towards freedom left to humanity a heritage of immense and eternal value, the model of transformation of an epoch and of a life of goodness and wisdom. In my name and on behalf of the Albanian people I would like to extend our deep condolences to his spouse, Graça Machel, to his entire family and to the people of South Africa. We, Albanians join the South African people and whole world in this grief." (spelling and grammar corrected)
- Belgium: Prime Minister Elio Di Rupo released a statement saying that Mandela "will remain a source of inspiration for millions of people". Flemish Minister-President Kris Peeters offered his "condolences to the South African people and to everyone who takes wisdom from Mandela's exceptional life story".
- Bulgaria: Foreign Minister Kristian Vigenin expressed his condolences, calling Mandela "a...person who left a bright trace in the history of South Africa...and mankind"
- Croatia: Prime Minister Zoran Milanović said in a statement of condolences that Mandela will be remembered as a "unique political figure, devoted to the ideals of democracy" and an inspiration to many in Croatia.
- Czech Republic: Prime Minister Jiří Rusnok said that Mandela "was not only a prominent figure of political and social life in the Republic of South Africa, but also one of the most inspiring world leaders of our times. He embodied the fight against racism and injustice".
- Denmark: Prime Minister Helle Thorning-Schmidt released a statement, calling Mandela "a beacon of hope in the fight against oppression and injustice in the world" and said that "Mandela's ideals and actions will forever serve as an inspiration to us all in the fight for global justice and human rights for all". She also conveyed her condolences to Mandela's family and the South African people.
- Finland: Sauli Niinistö, President of Finland, sent a letter to the incumbent South African President Jacob Zuma, stating that "Finns and the whole world will remember Mandela's contribution to peace, human rights and democracy."
- France: President François Hollande commented on the future continuation of Mandela's ideals, stating that "Mandela's message will never die. It will continue to inspire freedom fighters and give confidence to people who defend just causes and universal rights."
- Greece: Prime Minister Antonis Samaras said that not only South Africans but the entire international community mourns for a hero who wrote great pages in modern history. A symbol of the struggle for human dignity, equality and freedom for a better and fairer world. He also described Nelson Mandela as an ideological fighter against violence, apartheid and all forms of racism and that Greeks will forever honor his memory."
- Hungary: Prime Minister Viktor Orbán expressed the Hungarians' sincere condolences to Mandela's family and the South African people. He emphasised that Mandela's fight for democracy was an inspiration during the years of the communist dictatorship and in the period of transition to the democratic political system in Hungary. President János Áder also expressed his "most sincere grief and sympathy on behalf of the people of Hungary", according to Áder "Nelson Mandela will remain a symbol of freedom for the whole world".
- Ireland: Irish Taoiseach Enda Kenny expressed his sympathies and wrote, "Today, a great light has been extinguished. The boy from the Transkei has finished his long walk. His journey transformed not just South Africa, but humanity itself."
- Monaco: The palace released a statement saying that the Prince and Princess of Monaco, (who was born in South Africa), "both considered Mandela an example, a symbol of reconciliation, a great man who has, through his courage, selflessness and generosity, changed the course of history".
- Norway: Prime Minister Erna Solberg expressed her condolences, calling Mandela "a leader not only for his own country but also for the whole world. He was the greatest symbol of hope, freedom and democracy of our time. We will remember him for his struggle against apartheid, his work for reconciliation, and his important effort in the fight against poverty and HIV/AIDS."
- Romania: Romanian Prime Minister Victor Ponta reacted to the announcement of Mandela's death and released a statement saying that "Mandela will remain in history as one of the greatest fighters for liberty, who demonstrated, through hard effort and self-sacrifice, that there are no differences based upon race or the color of one's skin."
- Russia: President of Russia Vladimir Putin sent his condolences, saying that "having endured difficult sufferings, Mandela remained faithful to the ideals of humanism and justice until the end of his life".
- Serbia: Serbian President Tomislav Nikolić said that "Citizens of Serbia deeply mourn the passing of a great leader, fighter, statesman and son of Africa". The Serbian Parliament observed a minute silence in his honour and Serbian flags flew at half-mast on 6 December on all government buildings and embassies worldwide."
- Slovakia: Slovak President Ivan Gašparovič said that "Gandhi of Africa has passed way."
- Spain: King Juan Carlos I expressed his condolences by stating that "Mandela has always exercised a heroic personal sacrifice."
- Sweden: Swedish Prime Minister Fredrik Reinfeldt stated: "Nelson Mandela was a person who changed the world. He was deeply convinced of the equality between human beings and had an equally strong commitment and capacity for reconciliation. He chose reconciliation where others would have chosen revenge. He created a new South Africa and gave people all over the world someone to look up to and a role model."
- Ukraine: Ukrainian President Viktor Yanukovych, in a letter of condolences to South African President Jacob Zuma, said of Mandela: "For many generations an example of fortitude, integrity and strength of character".
- United Kingdom: British Prime Minister David Cameron was one of the first to express his grief on Twitter, calling Mandela "a hero of our time". The Foreign Office announced that UK national flags will be flown at half-mast for three days.

- Gibraltar: Chief Minister Fabian Picardo said "Gibraltar adds its small reflection on a man who inspired his nation to reconcile after the horrors of apartheid and who inspired generations of people around the world to understand the importance of magnanimity and of treating everyone as you would wish to be treated yourself."
- Guernsey: Chief Minister Peter Harwood said Mandela served as an inspiration to all generations across all nations, and was an exemplar of the true meaning of reconciliation.
- Jersey: Chief Minister Ian Gorst said "Nelson Mandela is one of the heroes of my generation – a man whose life and actions have changed a nation and inspired people around the world to believe in the value of equality and reconciliation. He was truly a man who let his life speak."

- Northern Ireland: First Minister Peter Robinson said, "We have known for some time that he was ill, nonetheless, it still comes as a great shock to lose such an inspirational man and a massive figure in terms of world politics."

- Scotland: First Minister Alex Salmond said Mandela was "an inspiration to countless millions".
- British Virgin Islands: Premier Dr. D. Orlando Smith said the "Government and people of the Virgin Islands join the world community in mourning the loss and remembering the life and legacy of the late Nelson Madiba Mandela."

- Wales: First Minister Carwyn Jones paid tribute to Mandela's "strength of character that allowed him to put aside his difficulties, his trials, his sufferings, for the good of all people."

- Vatican City: Pope Francis, in an official telegram of condolence to South African President Jacob Zuma, stated: "It was with sadness that I learned of the death of former President Nelson Mandela, and I send prayerful condolences to all the Mandela family, to the members of the government, and to all the people of South Africa, in commending the soul of the deceased to the mercy of Almighty God, I ask the Lord to console and strengthen all who mourn his loss, paying tribute to the steadfast commitment shown by Nelson Mandela in promoting the human dignity of all the nation's citizens and in forging a new South Africa built on the firm foundations of non-violence, reconciliation and truth, I pray that the late President's example will inspire generations of South Africans to put justice and common good at the forefront of their political aspirations. With these sentiments, I invoke upon all the people of South Africa divine gifts of peace and prosperity."

==== North America ====
- Antigua and Barbuda: Prime Minister Baldwin Spencer wrote of Mandela's influence on political leaders around the world while expressing that "as a trade unionist and politician, I have treasured the lessons from his life and his unquenchable desire to spend himself for the well-being of others." He also announced a week of national mourning with flags to be flown at half-staff.
- Bahamas: Prime Minister Perry Christie expressed condolences to Mandela's family and the people of South Africa, while writing that "he was the personification of the timeless virtues of personal sacrifice and perseverance in the pursuit of freedom, racial equality, human dignity and moral truth for all the peoples of this planet."
- Belize: Prime Minister Dean Barrow described Mandela as "the last global hero history will ever see" and wrote that Mandela's "towering strength, his unimaginable self-sacrifice, and the way in which he governed post-Apartheid South Africa without recrimination or reprisal, constitute a greatness that will never again be matched." He also ordered flags to be flown at half-staff.
- Canada: Prime Minister Stephen Harper released a statement, "With the death of Nelson Mandela, the world has lost one of its great moral leaders and statesmen. Mr. Mandela was imprisoned for 27 years by the former Government of South Africa, for his part in the struggle that would ultimately end the system of apartheid. Despite his long years of captivity, Mr. Mandela left prison with a heart closed to calls for a settling of scores. Instead, he was filled by a longing for truth and reconciliation, and for an understanding between all peoples. He demonstrated that the only path forward for the nation was to reject the appeal of bitterness. His forbearance was legendary: his magnanimity spared all South Africans incalculable suffering. Nelson Mandela's enduring legacy for his country, and the world, is the example he set through his own 'long walk to freedom.' With grace and humility, he modelled how peoples can transform their own times and in doing so, their own lives. On behalf of the Government of Canada and all Canadians, Laureen and I extend our condolences to Mr. Mandela's widow, Graça Machel, his entire family and all citizens of South Africa. Canada, a nation that granted Mr. Mandela honorary citizenship in 2001, mourns with you and the entire world today."
- Costa Rica: President Laura Chinchilla expressed that "today the world mourns the departure of Nelson Mandela. He led his country to a deferential scenario that suffered. Our country and the world are touched by the loss of one of the men most exemplary of contemporary history."
- Cuba: President Raul Castro sent condolences and expressed his sympathies to Mandela's family, the African National Congress and the people of South Africa, saying "we profess deep respect and admiration for Mandela, not only for what he did for his people, but also for his true friendship towards our country and declared official mourning from December 6, at 6 am to December 7, at midnight and National Mourning of December 8 for the passing of Nelson Mandela."
- Dominican Republic: President Danilo Medina in a letter sent to South Africa President Jacob Zuma, expressed the condolences in name of the country, its people and himself, for the death of the leader of the fight against segregation in the African country and declared three days of official mourning."
- Grenada: Prime Minister Keith Mitchell expressed his belief that "Mr. Mandela is arguably the greatest public figure of the 20th century; whose eternal legacy will be about the importance of forgiveness, reconciliation and respect for all people. Through sheer moral conviction he transcended politics, and inspired people of every culture, everywhere."
- Guatemala: President Otto Pérez Molina lamented the death of Mandela and stated that the political career and life of Mandela left a legacy in humanity. "He is an example to follow for all free men", he said.
- Haiti: Prime Minister Laurent Lamothe expressed condolences to Mandela's family and wrote that "Haiti will never forget this great leader."
- Jamaica: Prime Minister Portia Simpson-Miller expressed sadness and wrote that Mandela was "without a doubt one of the greatest human beings in the history of humanity" and an inspiration to all persons of African descent and declared five days of official mourning.
- Mexico: President Enrique Peña Nieto expressed his condolences both on his Twitter account and in a conference, stating that "humanity has lost an unreachable fighter of peace, liberty, and equality". He also sent his condolences to the South African people and Mandela's family.
- Nicaragua: President Daniel Ortega declared three days of mourning and wrote that "the world says goodbye to a great man, a myth, a legend, a patrimony of Africa and of humanity. Nelson Mandela lived each day of his life struggling steadfastly for peace, fraternity and human dignity."
- United States: President Barack Obama gave a 4 1/2 minute speech after the announcement of Mandela's death, saying "I am one of the countless millions who drew inspiration from Nelson Mandela's life, I would study his words, his writings. The day he was released from prison gave me sense of what human beings can do when they're guided by their hopes and not by their fears." He continued, "For now, let us pause and give thanks for the fact that Nelson Mandela lived, a man who took history in his hands, and bent the arc of the moral universe toward justice. May God Bless his memory and keep him in peace.". Tributes also came from former presidents Jimmy Carter, George H. W. Bush, Bill Clinton and George W. Bush. All U.S. flags were ordered to fly at half-staff until sunset, 9 December 2013. Texas U.S. Senator Ted Cruz attended the memorial as a representative of the U.S.

==== Oceania ====
- Australia: Prime Minister Tony Abbott said while he had never met Mandela, he thought he was an extraordinary man. "Nelson Mandela was one of the great figures of Africa... and arguably one of the great figures of the century." He also added: "Mr Mandela would be remembered not just as a political leader but a moral leader."
- Fiji: Prime Minister Voreqe Bainimarama said "the thoughts of every Fijian are with the South African people as you mourn the loss of this great man. He was not only leader of South Africa but a beacon of courage, decency and selflessness for the whole world. He was genuinely loved and we will never forget him."
- New Zealand: Prime Minister John Key praised Mandela as "an inspirational leader, and a remarkable man... a force for change, not only in South Africa, but around the world".
- Papua New Guinea: Prime Minister Peter O'Neill said "it was [Mandela's] absolute forgiveness of the apartheid government that imprisoned him ... that laid the foundations for the transition from decades of undemocratic apartheid rule to a robust democracy in a very short period of time".

==== South America ====
- Argentina: President Cristina Fernández de Kirchner issued a statement which expressed condolences to the Mandela family and the people of South Africa, while also describing Mandela as "an indefatigable fighter for the triumph of democracy in his nation."
- Bolivia: President Evo Morales expressed condolences to the people of South Africa and wrote that Mandela remains a strength and an inspiration. The Bolivian Senate observed a moment of silence to remember Mandela.
- Brazil: President Dilma Rousseff issued a statement of regret for the death of former President Mandela on Thursday, 5, in which stands as "the greatest personalities of the 20th century." According to Rousseff, the Brazilian people are shocked by the news of the death of South African politician. "Mandela led with passion and intelligence one of the most important processes of emancipation of human beings in modern history – the end of apartheid in South Africa," the statement said and declared seven days of national mourning
- Chile: President Sebastián Piñera expressed condolences and said that Mandela "had the generosity to fought all his life for the peace in South Africa"
- Colombia: President Juan Manuel Santos, through his Twitter account, deeply regretted the death of Nelson Mandela and stated that "His legacy will remain as our guide to reach peace." A formal statement was later released by the Ministry of Foreign Affairs stating condolences to the people of South Africa and to Mandela's family while also acknowledging him as an example for all the Colombians to follow.
- Venezuela: President Nicolas Maduro declared three days of national mourning. "Nine months since the passing of our Comandante (Hugo Chávez), another giant of the people of the world passed away today. Madiba you will live forever!" Maduro said on Twitter.

=== Partially recognised states ===
- Kosovo: Kosovan President Atifete Jahjaga stated that Mandela "will remain forever an inspiration in pursuit of freedom, peace, democracy and reconciliation".
- Sahrawi Republic: President Mohamed Abdelaziz sent a letter of condolence saying that the Sahrawi people were "joining the whole world today in mourning one of the most charismatic and revered statesmen of the 20th century.", adding that Mandela "will be remembered not only as the emancipator of his people and the first President of free and democratic South Africa but also as a beacon of hope and a source of great inspiration to all peoples in the world that are struggling against tyranny and oppression.". SADR Presidency also ordered that flags to be flown at half-staff and a three-day national mourning.
- : Taiwan (Republic of China): President Ma Ying-jeou said on Facebook, "the hero is dead, but the spirit of human rights will stayed in long time", we can't forget Mandela, the hero of human rights from South Africa.

=== Individuals ===
- Tenzin Gyatso, the 14th Dalai Lama sent his condolences to Mandela's family, describing him as a "...man of courage, principle and unquestionable integrity, a great human being, someone of whom we can truly say, "He lived a meaningful life.""
- Actor David Harewood, who portrayed Mandela in the 2010 film Mrs. Mandela, said on Twitter: "RIP Nelson Mandela. "We will never see his like again."
- Actor Dennis Haysbert, who portrayed Mandela in the 2007 film Goodbye Bafana, commented "Portraying Nelson Mandela, in the film 'Goodbye Bafana' was a defining moment in my life and my career,". He said: "We as a society, have been blessed to live in a time that Nelson Mandela has lived, loved, and led. What he has done for his country, his countrymen, and everyone on this planet may not be achieved again... ever."
- Actor Idris Elba, who portrays Mandela in the 2013 film Mandela: Long Walk to Freedom, commented: "What an honor it was to step into the shoes of Nelson Mandela and portray a man who defied odds, broke down barriers, and championed human rights before the eyes of the world. My thoughts and prayers are with his family."
- Actor Morgan Freeman, who portrayed Mandela in the 2009 film Invictus, said: "As we remember his triumphs, let us, in his memory, not just reflect on how far we've come, but on how far we have to go. Madiba may no longer be with us, but his journey continues on with me and with all of us".
- Retired talk show host Oprah Winfrey released the following statement upon learning of his death: "One of the great honors of my life was to be invited to Nelson Mandela's home, spend private time and get to know him. He was everything you've ever heard and more – humble and unscathed by bitterness. And he always loved to tell a good joke. Being in his presence was like sitting with grace and majesty at the same time. He will always be my hero. His life was a gift to us all."
- Actor Terrence Howard, who portrayed Mandela in the 2011 film Winnie Mandela, said in a statement: Mandela shall be missed but his spirit remains with us as long as we remember the principal of greater love for one another and respect for oneself." He bid farewell to Mandela saying: "Rest well brother until the world cries again for the warmth of your brilliant light!"

== Last will and testament ==
The last will and testament of Mandela was read on 3 February 2014. At the time of the reading, his estate was worth an estimated 46 million Rand. The will was written in 2004 and was last amended in 2008.

In the will, Mandela left his estate to Machel, family members, staff, schools and the ANC.
