= Qunu =

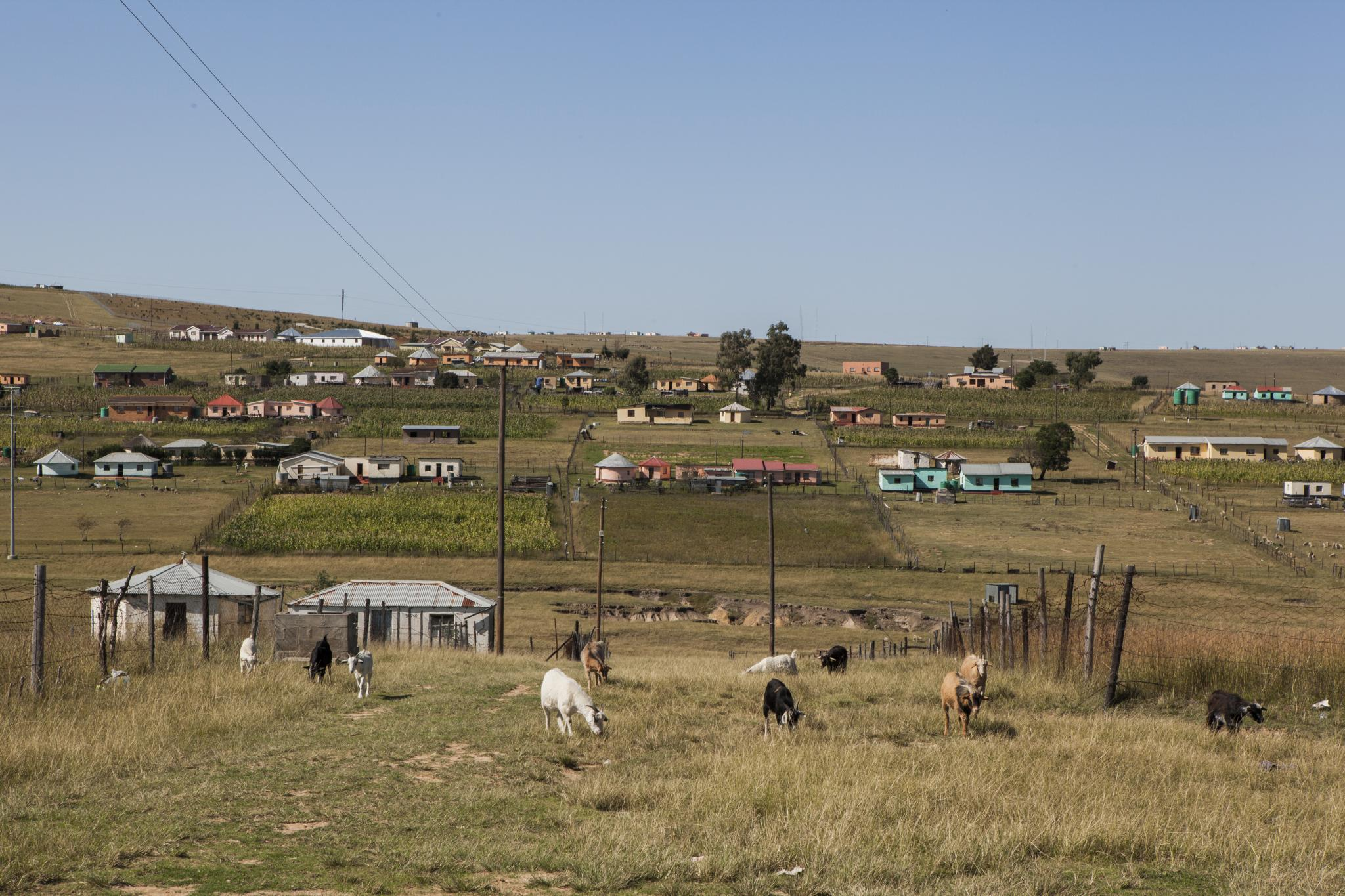
- Qunu village

- Location within Eastern Cape Location within South Africa
- Coordinates: 31°47′S 28°37′E
- Country: South Africa
- Province: Eastern Cape
- District: O.R. Tambo
- Municipality: King Sabata Dalindyebo

Area
  - Total: 1.65 km^{2} (0.64 sq mi)

Population (2001)
  - Total: 213
  - Density: 129/km^{2} (334/sq mi)
- Time zone: UTC+2 (SAST)
- PO box: 5105

Qunu (pronounced [ˈk͡ǃuːnu]) is a Xhosa rural village in South Africa's Eastern Cape Province, 32 km (20 mi) south-west of Mthatha on the N2 national route.

== The Mandela family ==
Former President of South Africa, Nelson Mandela was born near Qunu in the village Mvezo next to the Mbhashe River. He grew up in Qunu after his father was deposed as the chief of Mvezo. After his retirement, Mandela returned to Qunu. In his autobiography, Long Walk to Freedom, Mandela describes Qunu as the place where he spent the happiest moments of his childhood.

The remains of four of Mandela's children were originally buried here, but were exhumed by one of his grandsons, Mandla Mandela. Mandla reburied the remains in Mvezo, the village of which he was chief. On 3 July 2013 the Eastern Cape high court ruled that the remains should be moved back to Qunu. Shortly after this, King Buyelekhaya Dalindyebo relieved Mandla of his duties.

On 15 December 2013, Nelson Mandela was buried in Qunu following a state funeral, on his family's property in a spot he personally selected.

== Gallery ==
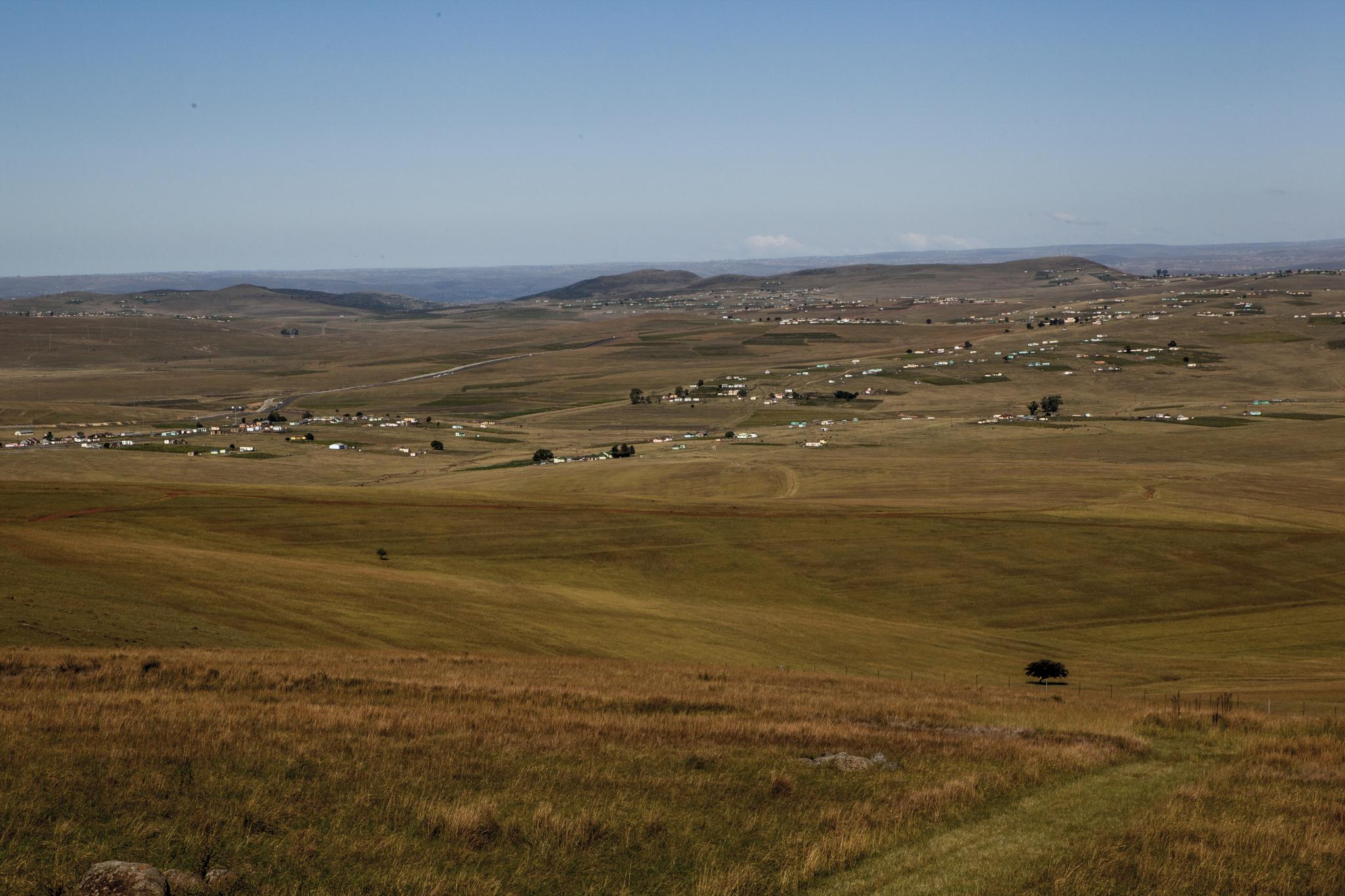
Landscape

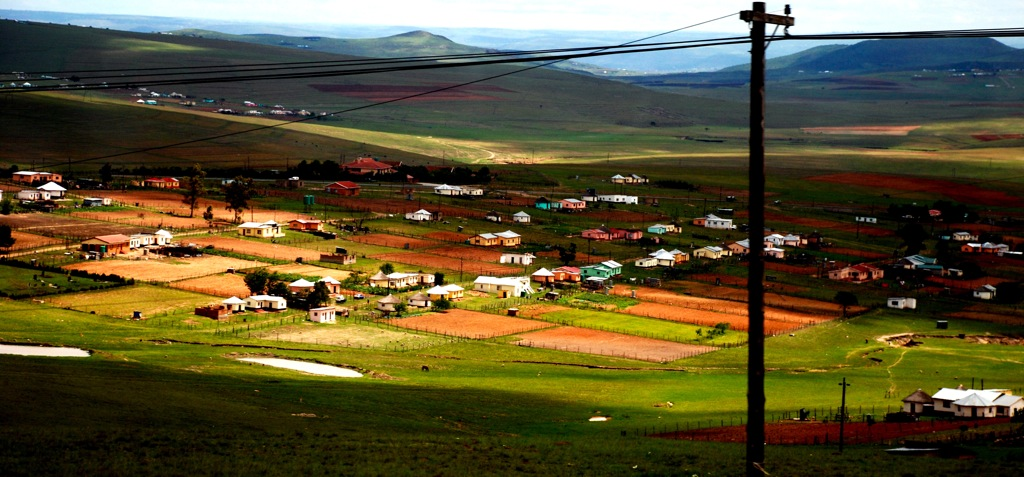
Aerial view
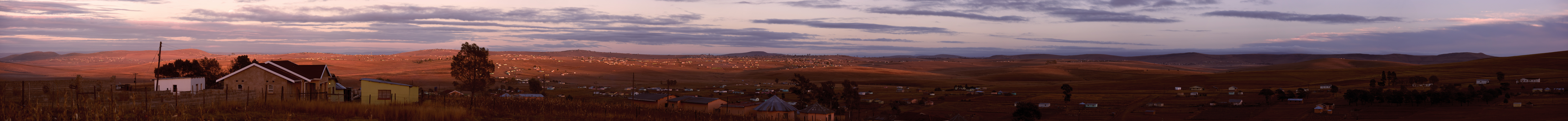
Panoramic view of Qunu and its surroundings.
