= Njabulo Mabuza =

Swazi businessman and politician

Njabulo Mabuza is a Swazi businessman and politician. He is the member of parliament for Khubuta inkhundla for the term from 2013 until 2018. He was the Minister for Health and Social Welfare and MP for Khubuta constituency for two terms before being replaced by Charles Myeza.

== Career ==
Mabuza was originally a bus operator, running Mdumiseni Bus Service. Mabuza was once the Chairman of the Public Accounts Committee, which is a parliamentary committee which regulates government spending.
