= Gugulethu Mchunu =

South African politician

Gugulethu Mchunu MP

Member of the National Assembly of South Africa
- Incumbent
- Assumed office 25 June 2024

Personal details
- Party: uMkhonto weSizwe Party

Gugulethu Mchunu is a South African politician who has been a Member of the National Assembly of South Africa since June 2024, representing the uMkhonto weSizwe Party, the official opposition. Mchunu was elected in the 2024 general election.
