= Health in Eswatini =

The Health Sector in Eswatini is deteriorating and four years into the United Nations sustainable development goals, Eswatini seems unlikely to achieve the goal on good health. As a result of 63% poverty prevalence, 27% HIV prevalence, and poor health systems, maternal mortality rate is at a high of 389/100,000 live births, and under 5 mortality rate is at 70.4/1000 live births resulting in a life expectancy that remains amongst the lowest in the world. Despite significant international aid, the government fails to adequately fund the health sector. Nurses are now and again engaged in demonstrations over poor working conditions, drug shortages, all of which impairs quality health delivery. Despite tuberculosis and AIDS being major causes of death, diabetes and other non-communicable diseases are on the rise. Primary health care is relatively free in Eswatini save for its poor quality to meet the needs of the people. Road traffic accidents have increased over the years and they form a significant share of deaths in the country.

Furthermore, tuberculosis remains a significant problem. The shift has been towards multi-drug resistant strains. TB has an 18 percent mortality rate and 83 percent of cases are co-infected with HIV. There are roughly 14,000 new TB cases diagnosed each year.

The Human Rights Measurement Initiative finds that Eswatini is fulfilling 74.1% of what it should be fulfilling for the right to health based on its level of income. When looking at the right to health with respect to children, Eswatini achieves 85.5% of what is expected based on its current income. In regards to the right to health amongst the adult population, the country achieves only 52.8% of what is expected based on the nation's level of income. Eswatini falls into the "bad" category when evaluating the right to reproductive health because the nation is fulfilling only 84.2% of what the nation is expected to achieve based on the resources (income) it has available.

== Mental health ==
The global shift towards more non-communicable diseases does not spare Eswatini. However, scanty research is on mental illness in the country yet increasing levels of poverty, sexual violence, HIV/AIDS, alcohol and cannabis abuse are highly associated with mental health issues. Lack of policy, poor facilities, and limited personnel all contribute to poor awareness and is a concern that shall soon explode as a crisis in the population and burden it of disease in the country.

Eswatini does not have an expansive mental health infrastructure. Most healthcare is centralized in cities where only approximately 20% of the population lives. Though recently there may have been additions, in 2011 there was one psychiatrist in National Psychiatric Referral Hospital and in the country. Impractical as it may, they attended inpatients, prisoners, children, and outpatients.

Given Eswatini's overall health situation, many health-oriented non-governmental organizations, university programs, and other organizations work in the country on research and service projects related to health. However, mental health remains the periphery. Despite all these negatives, there is but one organization working on awareness and promotion of mental health in the country.

== HIV/AIDS ==
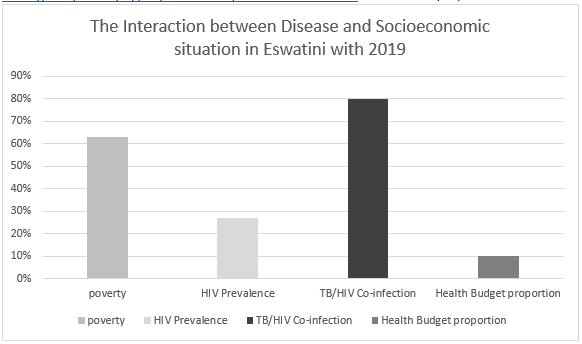
Demand versus funding in Eswatini Health

Eswatini has made significant strides in fighting HIV/AIDS. From being highest in prevalence and incidence in late 2000s, it has shifted to be a model for HIV control in the world. Urgency, programmatic shifts and international aid make the frontline in the combat against the epidemic. The first case of HIV in Eswatini was reported in 1986, approximately 26 years after the first known case in the world. Fast forward about two decades later, it was reported the biggest killer; at 64% of all deaths in the country. In 2003, the Eswatini government (then Swaziland) declared HIV/AIDS a national crisis, with 38.8% of tested pregnant women infected with HIV (see AIDS in Africa). Prime Minister Themba Dlamini declared a humanitarian crisis due to the combined effect of drought, land degradation, increased poverty, and HIV/AIDS. NERCHA was formed in 2003 to coordinate action against the disease. HIV care guidelines were published in 2010, revised in 2015 and most recently in 2018 to improve models of care, and fit emerging developments in the fight against HIV/AIDS. A 2016 SHIMS 2 found a significant decrease in prevalence of HIV compared to 2012 in SHIMS 1. Eswatini scores lowest incidence and related deaths today in the region. Universal ART coverage and extensive outreach targeted at hard to reach populations for HTC are responsible for the country's success towards the 90/90/90 2020 UNAIDS goal of ending HIV.

Public expenditure for HIV/AIDS was 4% of the GDP of the country, whereas private expenditure was 2.3%. Infant mortality was 57.19 per 1,000 in 2014, 47% of all deaths under 5 were caused by HIV/AIDS.

== Healthcare ==
There were 16 physicians per 100,000 persons in the early 2000s.

In September 2018 as the government had not paid suppliers the health service ran out of food and medicine. Swazipharm could not buy drugs. In May 2017 US$18 million was said to be owed to drug companies. There were only 12 working public ambulances in the country in June 2018.

=== Hospitals ===
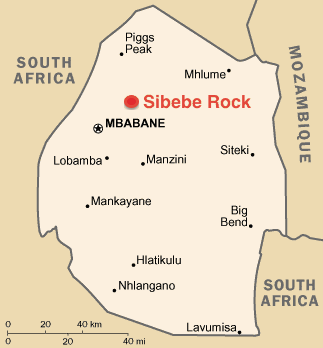

There were 135 medical facilities in Eswatini in 2019, including four hospitals run by the Ministry of Health and two hospitals run by NGO missions. The other medical facilities are clinics and health centers.

Medical facilities in Eswatini
Name	Location	Type facility	Ref
Mbabane Government Hospital	Hhohho Region	Referral Hospital	
Pigg's Peak Government Hospital	Hhohho Region	Regional Hospital	
Good Shepherd Hospital	Lubombo Region	Mission Hospital	
Mankayane Hospital	Manzini Region	Regional Hospital	
Raleigh Fitkin Memorial (RFM) Hospital	Manzini Region	Mission Hospital	
Hlatikhulu Hospital	Shiselweni Region	Regional Hospital	
