= Nkosazana Dlamini-Zuma =

South African politician (born 1949)

The Honourable Nkosazana Dlamini-Zuma MP
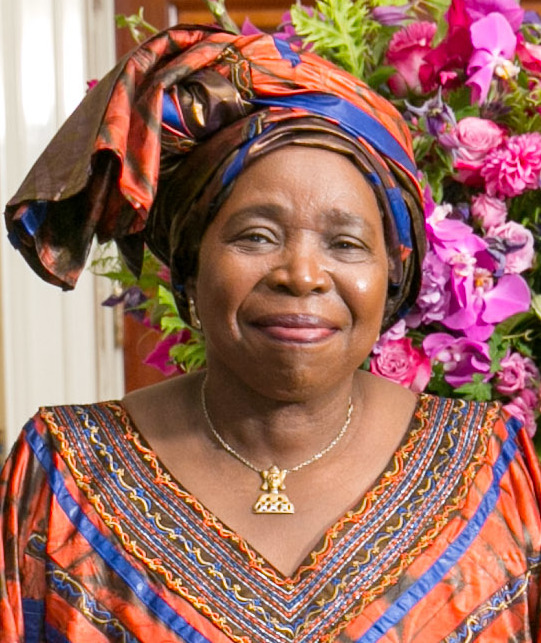
- Dlamini-Zuma in 2014

Minister of Women, Youth and Persons with Disabilities
- In office 6 March 2023 – 19 June 2024
- President: Cyril Ramaphosa
- Deputy: Sisisi Tolashe
- Preceded by: Maite Nkoana-Mashabane
- Succeeded by: Sindisiwe Chikunga

Minister of Cooperative Governance and Traditional Affairs
- In office 30 May 2019 – 6 March 2023
- President: Cyril Ramaphosa
- Deputy: Parks Tau (until 2020); Obed Bapela (2019–2023); Thembi Nkadimeng (2021–2023)
- Preceded by: Zweli Mkhize
- Succeeded by: Thembi Nkadimeng

Minister in the Presidency
- In office 28 February 2018 – 29 May 2019
- President: Cyril Ramaphosa
- Preceded by: Jeff Radebe
- Succeeded by: Jackson Mthembu

3rd Chairperson of the African Union Commission
- In office 15 October 2012 – 30 January 2017
- Deputy: Erastus Mwencha
- Preceded by: Jean Ping
- Succeeded by: Moussa Faki

Minister of Home Affairs
- In office 10 May 2009 – 3 October 2012
- President: Jacob Zuma
- Preceded by: Nosiviwe Mapisa-Nqakula
- Succeeded by: Naledi Pandor

Minister of Foreign Affairs
- In office 14 June 1999 – 10 May 2009
- President: Thabo Mbeki; Kgalema Motlanthe
- Preceded by: Alfred Nzo
- Succeeded by: Maite Nkoana-Mashabane (International Relations and Cooperation)

21st Minister of Health
- In office 10 May 1994 – 14 June 1999
- President: Nelson Mandela
- Preceded by: Rina Venter
- Succeeded by: Manto Tshabalala-Msimang
Additional offices 1994–present
Chancellor of the University of Limpopo
Incumbent
Assumed office 28 May 2019
Vice-Chancellor	Mahlo Mokgalong
Preceded by	Reuel Khoza

Personal details
- Born: Nkosazana Clarice Dlamini; 27 January 1949 (age 77) Natal, Union of South Africa
- Party: African National Congress
- Spouse: Jacob Zuma (m. 1982; div. 1998)
- Relations: Hlobisile Dlamini (sister)
- Children: 4, including Gugulethu and Thuthukile
- Education: University of Zululand; University of Natal; University of Bristol; University of Liverpool
- Occupation: Politician; medical doctor; diplomat; anti-apartheid activist

Nkosazana Clarice Dlamini-Zuma (née Dlamini; born 27 January 1949), sometimes referred to by her initials NDZ, is a South African politician, medical doctor and former anti-apartheid activist. A longstanding member of the African National Congress (ANC), she currently serves as a Chancellor of the University of Limpopo.

Dlamini-Zuma was born and educated in the former Natal province, where, as a student, she became involved in the Black Consciousness Movement through the South African Students' Organisation. Between 1976 and 1990, she lived in exile outside South Africa, primarily in the United Kingdom and Swaziland, where she practiced medicine and engaged in ANC activism. Since 1994, Dlamini-Zuma has served in the cabinet of every post-apartheid South African president. She was Minister of Health under President Nelson Mandela, and Minister of Foreign Affairs for ten years under Presidents Thabo Mbeki and Kgalema Motlanthe. During the first term of President Jacob Zuma, she was Minister of Home Affairs, in which portfolio she was credited with turning around a dysfunctional department. During President Cyril Ramaphosa's second term, she was briefly also Minister of Women, Youth and Persons with Disabilities.

Under President Cyril Ramaphosa, she served as Minister in the Presidency for Planning, Monitoring and Evaluation, with responsibility for the National Planning Commission, before becoming Minister of Cooperative Governance and Traditional Affairs, in which capacity she had a prominent and controversial role in regulating South Africa's lockdown during the COVID-19 pandemic. She was absent from the South African government between October 2012 and January 2017, when she served as the Chairperson of the African Union Commission, making her the first woman to lead either that organisation or its predecessor, the Organisation of African Unity. Her tenure in that position was also controversial.

She has been a member of the ANC's National Executive Committee since the early 1990s, and has twice campaigned unsuccessfully for leadership positions in the party: in 2007, at the ANC's 52nd National Conference, Motlanthe defeated her to win the deputy presidency; while at the 54th National Conference in 2017, she narrowly lost the ANC presidency to Ramaphosa, the incumbent.

== Early life and career ==
Nkosazana Clarice Dlamini was born on 27 January 1949 to a Zulu family in Natal. Her father, Willibrod Gweva, was a teacher, whose brother Stephen Dlamini was an activist in the African National Congress (ANC); her mother Rose was a homemaker. The eldest of eight children, Dlamini-Zuma completed high school in Amanzimtoti at Adams College, a mission school attended by many ANC stalwarts. She matriculated in 1967. Wanting to become a lawyer but acquiescing to her father's eagerness that she become a doctor, she earned a BSc degree in zoology and botany from the University of Zululand in 1971, and then went to the University of Natal to study medicine. While there, she became an active member of South African Students' Organisation, a Black Consciousness grouping, and was elected as its deputy president in 1976.

With her political activity attracting police attention, she went into exile later in 1976. She therefore finished her medical studies in the United Kingdom, graduating with an MBChB from the University of Bristol in 1978. She was chairperson of the ANC Youth Section in Britain between 1977 and 1978, and in that capacity often travelled elsewhere in Europe. After she graduated, Dlamini-Zuma worked in England for two years, at Bristol's Frenchay Hospital and Berkshire's Canadian Red Cross Memorial Hospital, while serving on the British Regional Political Committee of the ANC. She then spent five years in Swaziland, where she worked as a paediatric officer at the Mbabane Government Hospital. She met her future husband, Umkhonto we Sizwe activist Jacob Zuma, while embedded in the ANC underground in Swaziland.

In 1985, Dlamini-Zuma returned to the United Kingdom to complete a diploma in tropical child health from Liverpool University's School of Tropical Medicine. In subsequent years, she continued her work in paediatrics; helped found and directed the Health Refugee Trust, a British non-governmental organisation; and then returned briefly to Africa in 1989, to work for the ANC Health Department in Lusaka, Zambia. She returned to South Africa when the ANC was unbanned by the National Party government in 1990, signalling the beginning of the country's transition to non-racial democracy. During the Convention for a Democratic South Africa (CODESA) negotiations in 1992, she was part of the Gender Advisory Committee. In the transition period, she also served on the Executive Committee and Health Committee of the ANC's Southern Natal branch, and as a research scientist at South Africa's Medical Research Council in Durban.

== Career in government ==
=== 1994–1999: Minister of Health ===
In 1994, after South Africa's first election under universal suffrage, Dlamini-Zuma was appointed as Minister of Health in the cabinet of President Nelson Mandela, where she continued the work of her predecessor, Rina Venter, in racially desegregating the health system and broadening state anti-tobacco measures. In 1999, Dlamini-Zuma introduced the Tobacco Products Amendment Bill, which made it illegal to smoke in public buildings. Her term also coincided with the beginning of the HIV/AIDS epidemic in South Africa. Despite Dlamini-Zuma's history of HIV/AIDS activism, including a stint on the National Aids Coordinating Committee in 1992 and a period as Deputy Chairperson of the United Nations AIDS programme (UNAIDS) in 1995, she and her Ministry were criticised for publicly supporting Virodene, a "quack remedy" for HIV/AIDS.

==== Sarafina II ====
In August 1995, the Department of Health awarded a R14.27m contract to Mbongeni Ngema, a "good friend" of Dlamini-Zuma's, to produce a sequel to Sarafina!, a popular South African musical. Sarafina II was designed as an HIV/AIDS public awareness initiative. However, investigations revealed that Dlamini-Zuma had misled Parliament about the source of the project's funding (which the Department had falsely said was sponsored by the European Union) and had ignored proper bidding procedures. The play was shelved in 1996, after the Public Protector published a report criticising the project's poor financial controls and procedural irregularities.

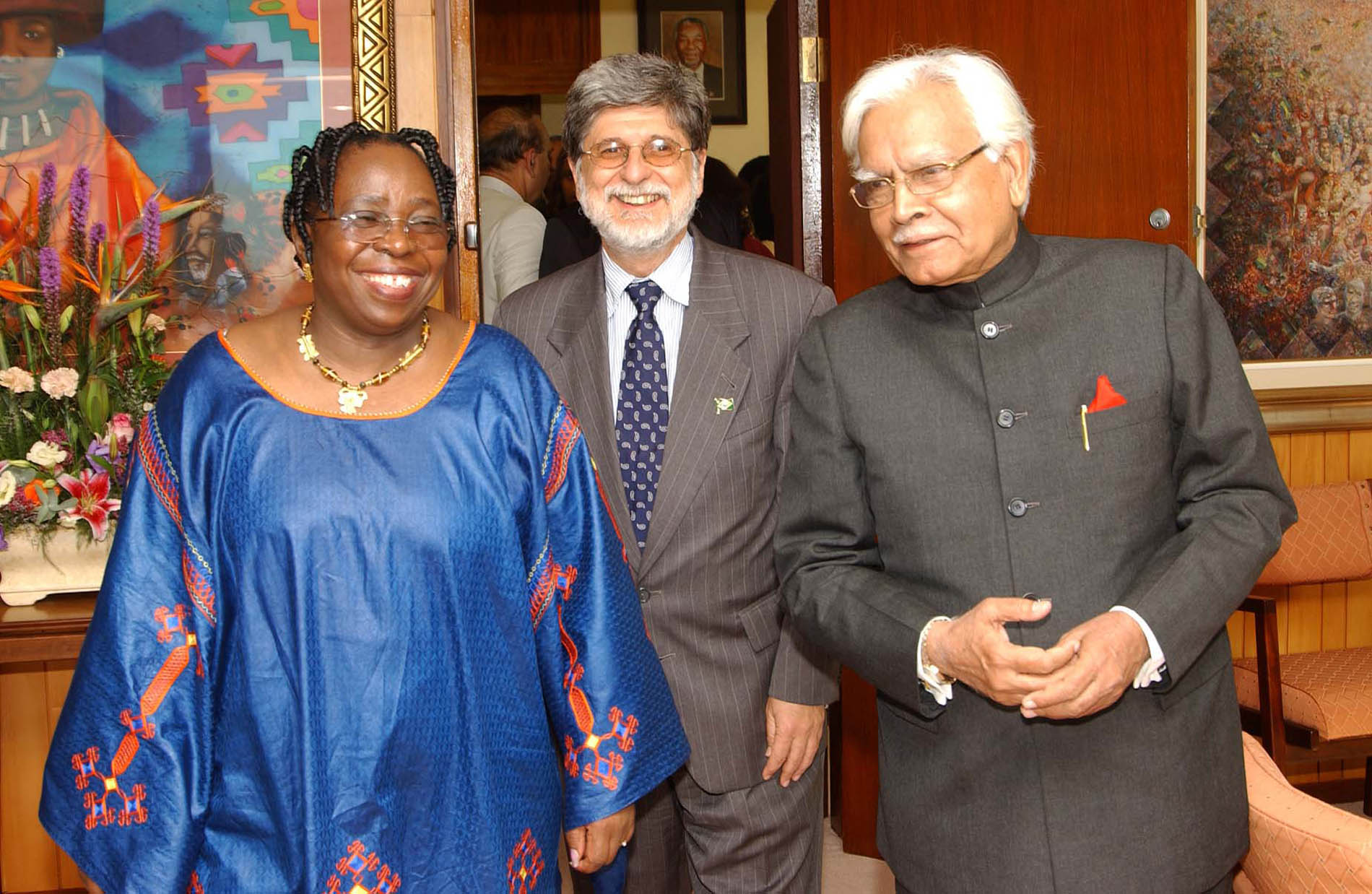
IBSA foreign ministers: Dlamini-Zuma with Natwar Singh and Celso Amorim in Cape Town, March 2005.

=== 1999–2009: Minister of Foreign Affairs ===
Dlamini-Zuma served as Minister of Foreign Affairs from 1999 to 2009, under Presidents Thabo Mbeki and Kgalema Motlanthe. Opposition leader Tony Leon said that her appointment was "like sending the bull into the china shop". At the beginning of her term, in 1999, she was involved in shuttle diplomacy in the Second Congo War, mediating among factions of the Rally for Congolese Democracy and between Uganda and Rwanda. According to Africa Confidential, she was also particularly involved in pursuing Mbeki's goal of reforming the United Nations to increase the relative power of Global South countries, and more generally she promoted Mbeki's pan-Africanist "African Renaissance" vision. She was President of the 2001 World Conference Against Racism in Durban, and President of the Ministers' Council at the 2002 World Summit on Sustainable Development. Yet during her tenure, she was criticised for her "quiet diplomacy" in response to the land invasions and political crisis under Zimbabwe's ZANU-PF regime. Also during this period, in 2005, Mbeki reportedly offered her the post of Deputy President after Jacob Zuma was fired; she declined.

=== 2009–2012: Minister of Home Affairs ===
In May 2009, Dlamini-Zuma was appointed Minister of Home Affairs in the cabinet of her ex-husband, newly elected President Zuma. She held the role until October 2012, and was lauded for turning around the Department of Home Affairs. During her tenure, the Department – previously viewed as "a hotbed of corruption and incompetence" – received its first unqualified audit in 16 years, as well as an excellence award from the Department of Public Service and Administration. The Mail & Guardian attributed the improvement in service delivery to Dlamini-Zuma's technocratic efficiency and implementation of internal control measures. However, Home Affairs Director-General Mavuso Msimang, who had arrived at the department before Dlamini-Zuma, said that Dlamini-Zuma's predecessor, Nosiviwe Mapisa-Nqakula, was primarily responsible for the turnaround.

In 2011, Dlamini-Zuma encountered public outcry when the Dalai Lama was unable to attend Desmond Tutu's eightieth birthday party because the Department, hesitant to offend China, failed to issue him a visa. The Department's "deliberate delay" was ruled unlawful the following year by the Supreme Court of Appeal, in a judgement that strongly criticised Dlamini-Zuma.

== Chair of the African Union Commission ==
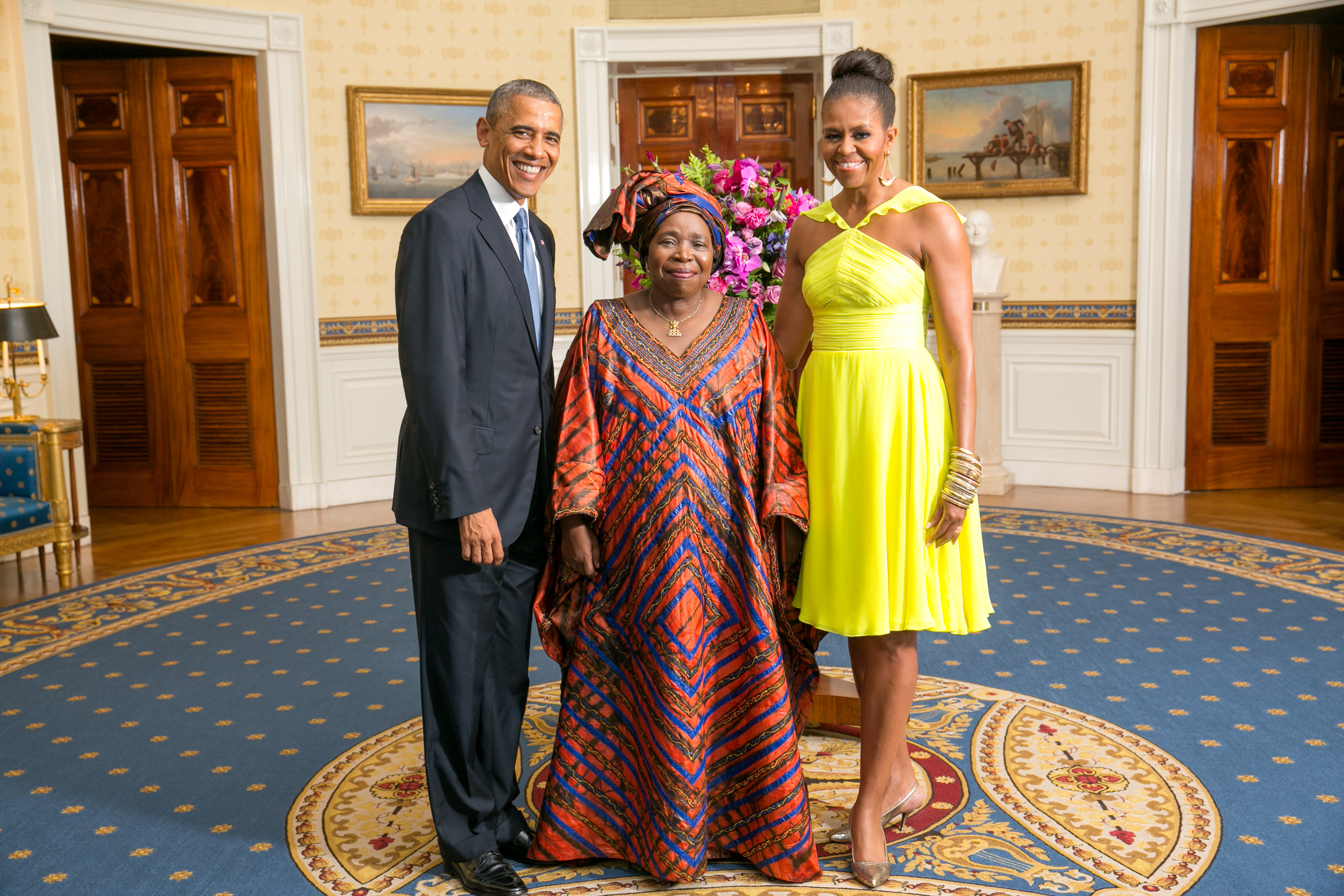
Dlamini-Zuma with U.S. President Barack Obama and First Lady Michelle Obama during the U.S.–Africa Leaders Summit, August 2014.

In January 2012, while still heading the Ministry of Home Affairs, Dlamini-Zuma contested the position of Chairperson of the African Union (AU) Commission. In doing so, she broke an "unwritten rule" that major African powers do not put forward candidates for AU positions. This angered many AU states, leading to a deadlock in the first election, despite the backing for Dlamini-Zuma's presidency provided by the fifteen states comprising the Southern African Development Community. As a consequence of the failure to secure a two-thirds majority of the vote, incumbent Jean Ping's term was extended by six months, until a second election on 15 July at the nineteenth session of the AU Assembly elected Dlamini-Zuma to the position. The vote was largely divided along language lines – Francophone states against Anglophone states, with the latter bloc supporting Dlamini-Zuma's candidacy. Dlamini-Zuma was Chairperson until 30 January 2017, when she was replaced by Chadian Foreign Minister Moussa Faki.

Dlamini-Zuma was unpopular and disliked among AU officials for her apparent aloofness and absenteeism. She was criticised for filling her advisory office and security detail with South African nationals, and for spending much of her time in South Africa instead of at AU headquarters in Addis Ababa, reinforcing "perceptions of South Africa as an insular nation". The Agenda 2063 plan spearheaded by Dlamini-Zuma was criticised as "quixotic" and unrealistic. Her leadership as chairperson was considered a disappointing failure, although she was acknowledged for the managerial improvements she made. This included her insistence on professionalism which enhanced the AU's reputation; it was taken more seriously as a result of her interventions. She was also an advocate for increased gender representation in the AU which further exacerbated her popularity issues. Furthermore, "[i]n a room of stuffy old men talking about guns and tanks, she brought in concepts like gender, human rights and food security." She was also credited with the politically courageous drive to suspend Egypt from the AU after Abdel Fattah el-Sisi's 2013 military coup, although she did not condemn other authoritarian power grabs elsewhere in Africa.

== Return to government ==
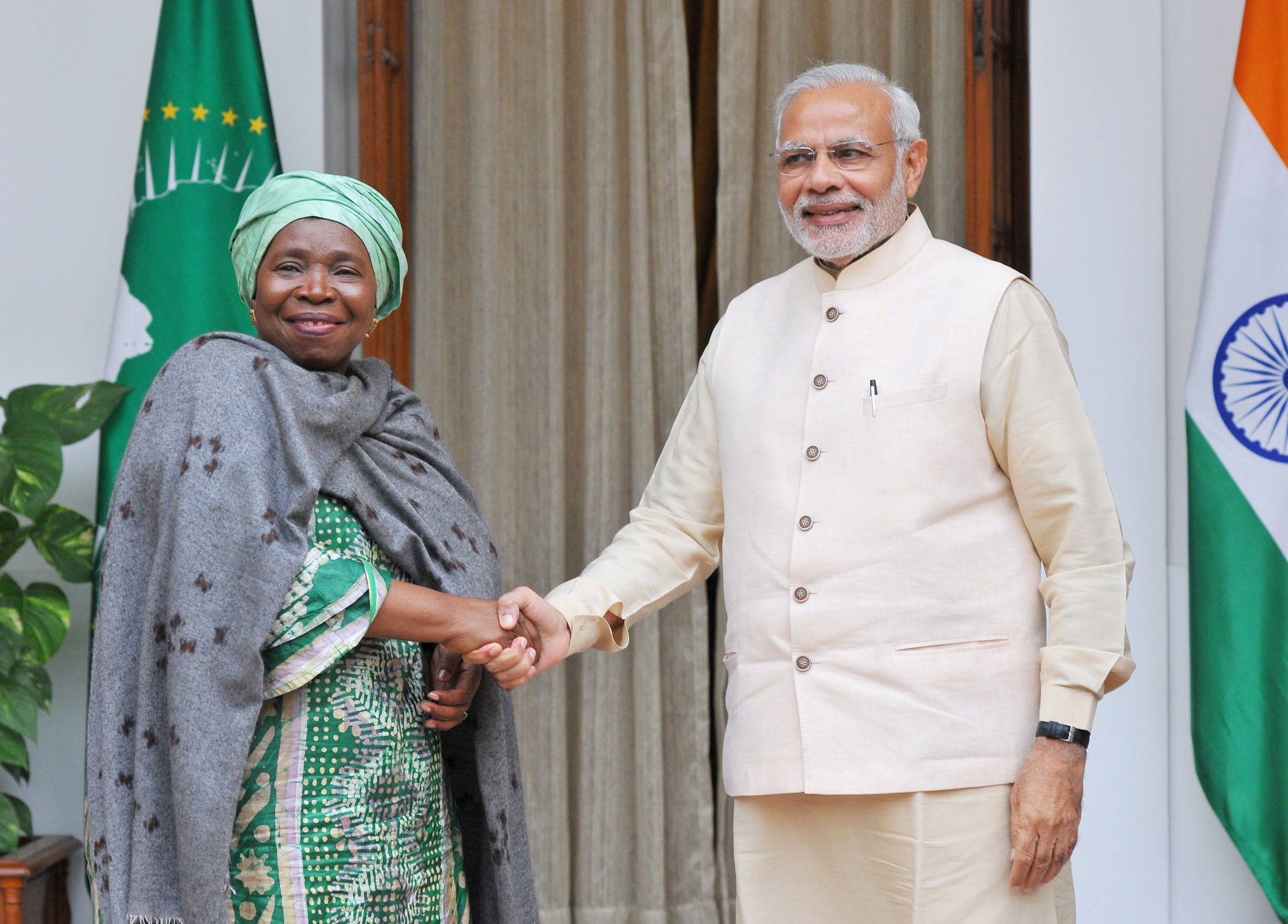
Dlamini-Zuma with Indian Prime Minister Narendra Modi during the third India–Africa Forum Summit in New Delhi, October 2015.

In early 2017, Dlamini-Zuma returned full-time to South Africa from Addis Ababa, and launched a campaign – ultimately unsuccessful – to win the presidency of the ANC. During her campaign, on 21 September 2017, she was sworn back in as a Member of the National Assembly, filling a casual vacancy arising from Pule Mabe's resignation. She denied rumours that she would replace Blade Nzimande as Minister of Higher Education in an imminent cabinet reshuffle, describing her return to Parliament as a standard redeployment arranged by the ANC. Earlier that year, there had been similar rumours that Zuma's ANC faction was lobbying for her to replace Pravin Gordhan as Minister of Finance.

=== 2018–2019: Minister in the Presidency ===
In February 2018, newly elected President Cyril Ramaphosa appointed Dlamini-Zuma Minister in the Presidency with responsibility for Planning, Monitoring and Evaluation. In this capacity she was the Chairperson of the National Planning Commission and oversaw the implementation of South Africa's National Development Plan.

=== 2019–2023: Minister of Cooperative Governance ===
Re-elected following general elections in May 2019, Ramaphosa announced his new cabinet, which saw Dlamini-Zuma moved to the head of the Ministry of Cooperative Governance and Traditional Affairs (COGTA). Dlamini-Zuma was expected to try to repeat her successes at Home Affairs in order to turn around another famously dysfunctional portfolio. However, observers agreed that, during her first three years in office, she failed to effect such a turnaround, with the financial mismanagement of municipalities remaining a major challenge on the Cooperative Governance front. In 2022, Dlamini-Zuma's office prepared a plan to revert the North West province to proper provincial administration after more than three years – since 2018, the province had been under national administration, supervised by COGTA, in terms of an emergency provision in the Constitution for dysfunctional provinces.

==== COVID-19 pandemic ====
Between March 2020 and April 2022, South Africa was officially under a national state of disaster, which allowed the executive to bypass Parliament in regulating the country's response to the COVID-19 pandemic. In terms of the Disaster Management Act, Dlamini-Zuma, as COGTA Minister, was responsible for promulgating those regulations; she therefore, unexpectedly, gained significant power over South African policy, leading many commentators to call her a de facto head of state or prime minister. In late April, Dlamini-Zuma announced that a controversial ban on the sale of tobacco would remain in place, contradicting an announcement by President Ramaphosa earlier that week. This apparent U-turn was met with much public comment about Dlamini-Zuma's apparently growing power in the cabinet, and necessitated a public statement from Ramaphosa to clarify that both his announcement and its reversal had been "on behalf of, and mandated by, the collective I lead". COGTA's bans on tobacco and alcohol, and other so-called "hard lockdown" regulations, were fiercely unpopular with parts of the population and were subject to several challenges in the courts.

However, some levity was introduced into the situation in May 2020, when South African DJ Max Hurrell released a house song which sampled remarks that Dlamini-Zuma had made during a press briefing about the tobacco ban. The song, entitled "Zol", featured recordings of Dlamini-Zuma explaining why sharing "zol" – South African slang for roll-up cigarettes usually containing cannabis – conduced to COVID-19 transmission: "When people zol, they put saliva on the paper, and then they share that zol". The song became a social media meme and the most played song in South Africa on Apple Music, and a video version produced by the Kiffness went viral online. Dlamini-Zuma Tweeted "Who is this Max Hurrell fellow? We just need to talk", and reached out to the DJ to congratulate him "on entertaining the nation during this difficult period".

=== 2023–2024: Minister of Women, Youth and Persons with Disabilities ===
In a cabinet reshuffle on 6 March 2023, Ramaphosa appointed Dlamini-Zuma as Minister in the Presidency responsible for Women, Youth and Persons with Disabilities.

== African National Congress leadership ==
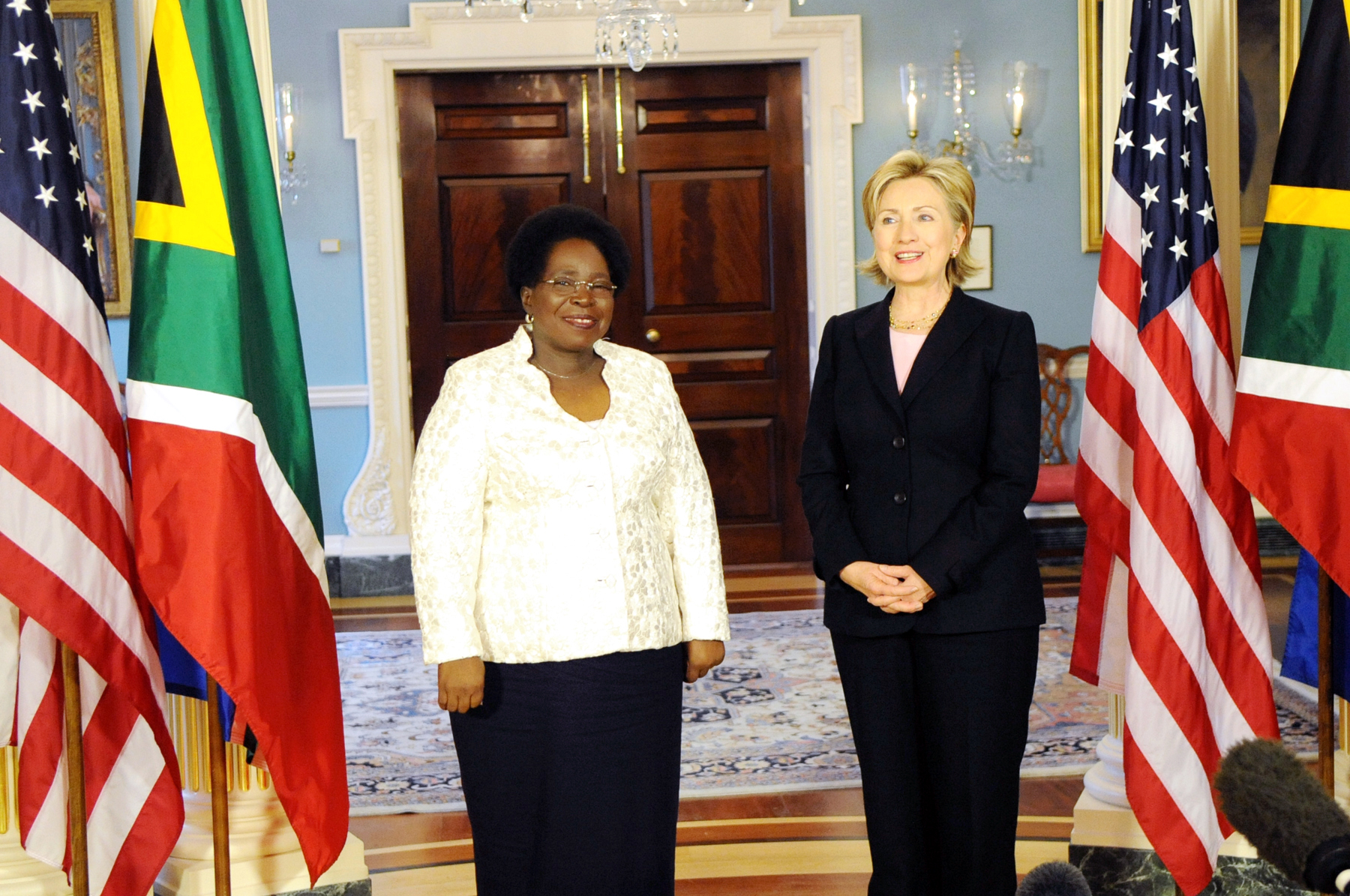
Dlamini-Zuma with U.S. Secretary of State Hillary Clinton during a bilateral meeting in Washington, D.C., March 2009.

=== 2007: Deputy presidential campaign ===
Dlamini-Zuma first joined the National Executive Committee (NEC) of the ANC in the period between 1991 and 1994, when she was co-opted onto the committee to fill a casual vacancy. She remained on the NEC thereafter: she was democratically elected for the first time at the ANC's 49th National Conference in 1994, and was re-elected at subsequent conferences in 1997 and in 2002. Ahead of the next national conference in 2007, some observers viewed her as a possible contender for the ANC's presidency and candidacy in national presidential elections. Instead, she was nominated for two other of the so-called Top Six positions in the party: four provinces (those aligned to Mbeki) nominated her as deputy president, while the other five (which backed a Zuma presidency) nominated her as national chairperson. She ultimately stood as deputy president on an Mbeki-aligned slate. Like the other members of that slate, she lost the vote, in her case to Motlanthe. However, she was re-elected to the NEC, and at the 2012 conference she won the most votes of any NEC candidate.

=== 2017: First presidential campaign ===
Ahead of the 54th National Conference of the ANC in December 2017, and having recently returned from her AU position in Addis Ababa, Dlamini-Zuma ran for the ANC presidency. As early as 2016, on some accounts, her supporters were "lobbying openly" for Dlamini-Zuma to replace Zuma as ANC president at the conclusion of the latter's term in late 2017. She was endorsed by the ANC Women's League in January 2017, and later by the ANC Youth League and the Umkhonto we Sizwe Military Veterans' Association. Dlamini-Zuma was viewed as media-shy, and only conducted one interview, with ANN7, during her campaign.

Her campaign, under the slogan #WeAreReady, centred on land redistribution, reform at the South African Reserve Bank, and economic transformation generally, a policy package which aligned her closely with the so-called Radical Economic Transformation (RET) faction, a pro-Zuma grouping. Indeed, some analysts suspected that Dlamini-Zuma's campaign was a "Trojan horse" for Zuma's interests, aiming to secure his continued influence over the party. At the conference, Dlamini-Zuma narrowly lost in a vote against Cyril Ramaphosa, winning 2,261 votes against his 2,440. She was re-elected to the NEC.

=== 2022: Second presidential campaign ===
By September 2022, amid preparations for the 55th National Conference, Dlamini-Zuma was understood to be planning to run again for the ANC presidency. She was nominated for the position by her own ANC branch in eThekwini, Kwa-Zulu Natal, and was again endorsed by former President Zuma.

== Controversies ==
=== "Rubbish" tweet ===
On 7 April 2017, amid national public demonstrations against Zuma's presidency, Dlamini-Zuma caused controversy by apparently disparaging the protests as "rubbish". Her verified Twitter account posted "[Their privilege] is what they are protecting... hence some of us are not part of this rubbish. They must join us for the march for our land they stole..." and deleted the tweet shortly thereafter. Dlamini-Zuma later said the tweet was "fake".

=== Alleged connections to cigarette smugglers ===
In 2017, journalist Jacques Pauw claimed in The President's Keepers that Dlamini-Zuma's campaign for the ANC presidency was sponsored partly by businessman Adriano Mazzotti, whose company, Carnilinx, was widely suspected of involvement in cigarette smuggling and other illicit activities. Mazzotti allegedly financed the campaign's merchandise. In subsequent weeks, the Sunday Times threw into question Mazzotti's rebuttal – that he had only met Dlamini-Zuma once, briefly – by publishing Instagram photographs of the pair together on two separate occasions. Both Mazzotti and, through her spokesman, Dlamini-Zuma denied that they had any "direct or substantive relationship". Johann van Loggerenberg claimed in his 2019 book, Tobacco Wars, that Mazzotti had admitted to assisting the campaign in acquiring merchandise – but through personal connections rather than by paying for the merchandise directly.

The allegations were revived in 2020, as commentators questioned whether Dlamini-Zuma was pursuing the government's tobacco ban because of her alleged connections to tobacco smugglers, who would benefit from the ban. Such speculation drew not only on the Mazzotti allegations, but also on the ties of Edward Zuma, Dlamini-Zuma's former stepson, to Amalgamated Tobacco Manufacturers, a cheap cigarette manufacturer also suspected of illicit activity. Dlamini-Zuma maintained that the ban was based on health concerns only. The subsequent closure of formal cigarette manufacturing facilities in South Africa and loss of tax on legal cigarette sales has been attributed to the dominance of illegal cigarettes in the South African market since the Covid bans.

== Personal life ==
Dlamini-Zuma was married to former President Jacob Zuma between 1982 and 1998. They had four daughters together: Msholozi (born 1982); Gugulethu Zuma-Ncube (born 1985), who married the son of Zimbabwean politician Welshman Ncube; Nokuthula Nomaqhawe (born 1987); and Thuthukile (born 1989), who was controversially appointed Chief of Staff in the Department of Telecommunications and Postal Services in 2014. Dlamini-Zuma divorced Zuma in June 1998 over irreconcilable differences.

Dlamini-Zuma's younger sister, Hlobisile, is also an ANC member and serves as Member of the Kwa-Zulu Natal Legislature.

== Honours ==
Dlamini-Zuma received the Order of Luthuli in gold in 2013. The same year, she was listed as one of New African magazine's top 100 most influential Africans, and in 2015 she was featured as one of the BBC's 100 Women. In 2019, she was appointed the Chancellor of the University of Limpopo, a non-residential and largely ceremonial position. In 2016, she was honored with the naming of the Dr Nkosazana Dlamini-Zuma Local Municipality, a merger of the Ingwe and Kwa Sani local municipalities, in KwaZulu-Natal.

Political offices
Preceded by Rina Venter	Minister of Health; 1994–1999	Succeeded by Manto Tshabalala-Msimang
Preceded by Alfred Nzo	Minister of Foreign Affairs; 1999–2009	Succeeded by Maite Nkoana-Mashabane as Minister of International Relations and Cooperation
Preceded by Nosiviwe Mapisa-Nqakula	Minister of Home Affairs; 2009–2012	Succeeded by Naledi Pandor
Positions in intergovernmental organisations
Preceded by Jean Ping	Chair of the African Union Commission; 2012–2017	Succeeded by Moussa Faki
