= Gugulethu Zuma-Ncube =

South African producer and actress

- Born: 10 October 1985 (age 40); Johannesburg, South Africa
- Spouse: Wesley Ncube (m. 2008)
- Parents: Jacob Zuma; Nkosazana Dlamini-Zuma

Comedy career
- Years active: 2007–present
- Medium: Television
- Genres: Drama; Comedy
- Subject: South African culture

Gugulethu Zuma-Ncube (born 10 October 1985) is a South African producer, actress and daughter of former President Jacob Zuma and African National Congress (ANC) politician Nkosazana Dlamini-Zuma, and daughter-in-law to Zimbabwean Movement for Democratic Change Alliance politician Professor Welshman Ncube.

== Early life ==
Zuma-Ncube was born in 1985. In 2007, she graduated from AFDA with a Live Performance degree. Sindiswa, a graduation film in which she played a role, was nominated for the Student Academy Awards (Student Oscars) in Hollywood. She met her future husband, Wesley Ncube, while she was studying in Cape Town, and married him at the end of 2008.

== Career ==
Gugulethu has appeared in several television shows, including Interrogation Room, SABC3's Isidingo, and e.tv's Rhythm City.

=== It's for Life ===
Through Nyenyedzi Productions, which she co-owns with her sisters Nokuthula Nomaqhawe and Thuthukile Zuma, she co-produced and acted in Mzansi Magic's It’s for Life, a 2011 sitcom about four 20-somethings who find a squatter in their house. Their father promoted the series through his official presidential Twitter account, for which he received criticism.

=== Uzalo ===
Zuma-Ncube also co-owns Stained Glass Productions with Kobedi "Pepsi" Pokane, through which they co-produced Uzalo for the SABC1 channel. It aired five days per week, Monday to Friday, and was the second-most popular television show in South Africa, behind Mzansi Magic's Isibaya telenovella, with which it was intended to compete.

In 2015 and 2016, various national newspapers alleged that Zuma-Ncube benefitted unduly from nepotism through contracts of R167 million from the SABC and R8 million from the eThekwini Metropolitan Municipality for Uzalo.

The first season of Uzalo, which aired in 2015, cost R50 million, and was filmed and produced in Durban, KwaZulu-Natal, where it received R8 million from the ANC-led local municipal government. The Democratic Alliance accused the local municipality of patronage for funding the private production, noting that there would be no government oversight of the spending and that the money could have helped less established entertainment businesses instead.

The TV series was caught in controversy when then-SABC CEO Hlaudi Motsoeneng intervened in a decision not to renew the series, deciding instead to commission another three seasons for around R167 million, an amount with which "the SABC could produce about 20 programmes". Stained Glass Productions were accused of political interference with the procurement processes of the SABC, which the co-producers denied, claiming that they "did everything by the book" and that they received no "special treatment".

== Politics ==
In 2011, she volunteered at Luthuli House, the ANC's headquarters, with her sister Thuthukile.

== Personal life ==
Gugulethu Zuma-Ncube, daughter of former South African President Jacob Zuma with politician ANC former wife and medical practitioner, Dr Nkosazana Dlamini-Zuma, is married to mathematician Wesley Ncube, son of Zimbabwean politician Prof Welshman Ncube. They were married on 20 December 2008 in Pretoria, South Africa.
