= Nkululeko Hlophe =

Swazi judge

Nkululeko Hlophe is a Swazi judge and High Judge of the Court of Swaziland as of November 2011.
