= Jacob Zuma =

President of South Africa from 2009 to 2018

His Excellency Jacob Zuma
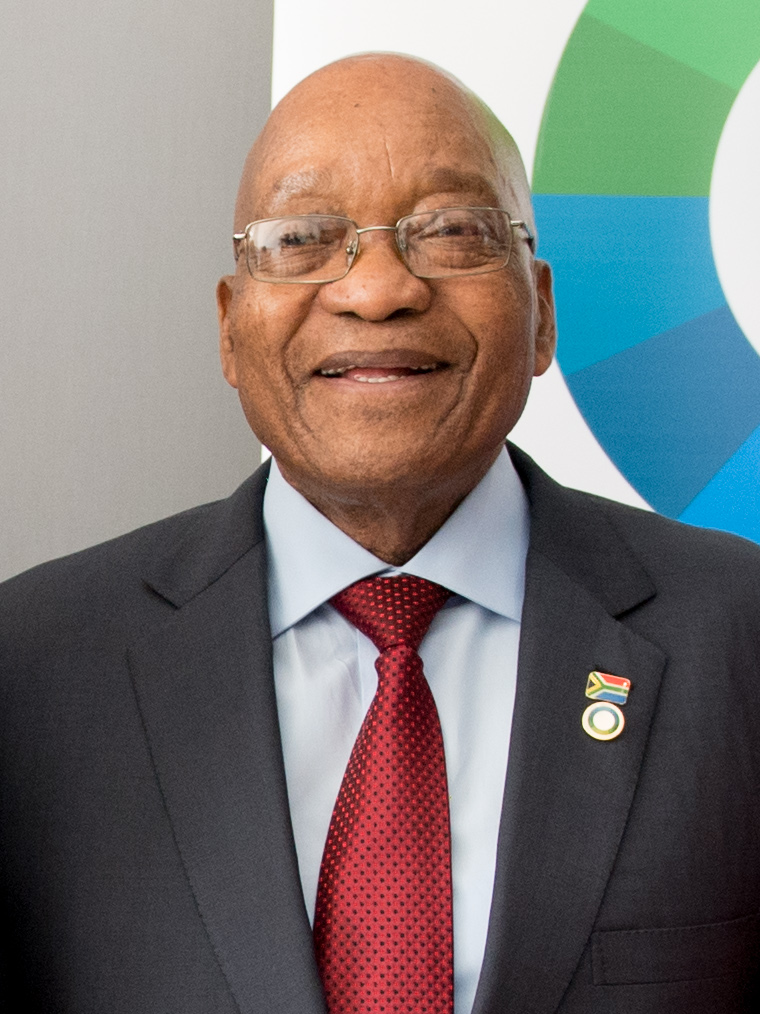
- Zuma in 2017

4th President of South Africa
- In office 9 May 2009 – 14 February 2018
- Deputy: Kgalema Motlanthe (2009–2014); Cyril Ramaphosa (2014–2018)
- Preceded by: Kgalema Motlanthe
- Succeeded by: Cyril Ramaphosa

President of the African National Congress
- In office 18 December 2007 – 18 December 2017
- Deputy: Kgalema Motlanthe (2007–2012); Cyril Ramaphosa (2012–2017)
- Preceded by: Thabo Mbeki
- Succeeded by: Cyril Ramaphosa

Deputy President of South Africa
- In office 14 June 1999 – 14 June 2005
- President: Thabo Mbeki
- Preceded by: Thabo Mbeki
- Succeeded by: Phumzile Mlambo-Ngcuka

Deputy President of the African National Congress
- In office 20 December 1997 – 18 December 2007
- President: Thabo Mbeki
- Preceded by: Thabo Mbeki
- Succeeded by: Kgalema Motlanthe

National Chairperson of the African National Congress
- In office 20 December 1994 – 20 December 1997
- Preceded by: Thabo Mbeki
- Succeeded by: Mosiuoa Lekota

Deputy Secretary-General of the African National Congress
- In office 7 July 1991 – 20 December 1994
- Preceded by: Position established
- Succeeded by: Cheryl Carolus

President of uMkhonto weSizwe
- Incumbent
- Assumed office 16 December 2023
- Deputy: John Hlophe
- Preceded by: Party established

Personal details
- Born: Jacob Gedleyihlekisa Zuma; 12 April 1942 (age 84) Nkandla, South Africa
- Party: uMkhonto weSizwe (since 2023); African National Congress (1959–2024)
- Other political affiliations: Communist (1963–1990)
- Spouses: Gertrude Khumalo (m. 1973) Kate Mantsho (m. 1976; died 2000) Nkosazana Dlamini (m. 1982; div. 1998) Nompumelelo Ntuli (m. 2008) Thobeka Mabhija (m. 2010) Gloria Ngema (m. 2012)
- Children: 20 (estimated), including Brumelda, Duduzile, Duduzane, Gugulethu, and Thuthukile
- Occupation: Politician; activist
- Nicknames: Nxamalala; Msholozi; JZ

Jacob Gedleyihlekisa Zuma (Note: Zulu: [geɮʱejiɬeˈkisa ˈzʱuma]; He is also referred to by his clan names Nxamalala and Msholozi.) (born 12 April 1942) is a South African politician who served as the fourth president of South Africa from 2009 to 2018. Zuma was a former anti-apartheid activist, member of uMkhonto weSizwe, and president of the African National Congress (ANC) from 2007 to 2017. He is also the father-in-law of Eswatini king Mswati III.

Zuma was born in the rural region of Nkandla, which is now part of the KwaZulu-Natal province and the centre of Zuma's support base. He joined the ANC at the age of 17 in 1959 and spent ten years in Robben Island Prison as a political prisoner. He went into exile in 1975 and was ultimately appointed head of the ANC's intelligence department. After the ANC was unbanned in 1990, he quickly rose through the party's national leadership and became deputy secretary general in 1991, national chairperson in 1994, and deputy president in 1997. He was the deputy president of South Africa from 1999 to 2005 under President Thabo Mbeki, Nelson Mandela's successor. Mbeki dismissed Zuma on 14 June 2005 after Zuma's financial adviser, Schabir Shaik, was convicted of making corrupt payments to Zuma in connection with the Arms Deal. Zuma was charged with corruption and was also acquitted on rape charges in the highly publicised 2006 trial. He managed to retain the support of a left-wing coalition inside the ANC, which allowed him to remove Mbeki as ANC president in December 2007 at the ANC's Polokwane elective conference.

Zuma was elected president of South Africa in the 2009 general election and took office on 9 May. The criminal charges against him were formally withdrawn the same week. As president, he launched the R4-trillion National Infrastructure Plan and signed a controversial nuclear power deal with the Russian government, which was blocked by the Western Cape High Court in 2017. As a former member of the South African Communist Party, he increasingly relied on left-wing populist rhetoric, and in his 2017 State of the Nation address he announced a new policy of "radical economic transformation". Among the few policies implemented before the end of his presidency were land expropriation without compensation, free higher education, a series of attempted structural reforms in key sectors involving restrictions on foreign ownership, and more stringent black economic empowerment requirements. In the international arena, Zuma emphasised South-South cooperation and economic diplomacy. The admission of South Africa to the BRICS grouping has been described as a major triumph for Zuma, and he has been praised for his HIV/AIDS policy.

Zuma's presidency was beset by controversy, especially during his second term. In 2014, the Public Protector found that Zuma had improperly benefited from state expenditure on upgrades to his Nkandla homestead, and in 2016, the Constitutional Court ruled that Zuma had failed to uphold the Constitution, leading to calls for his resignation and a failed impeachment attempt in the National Assembly. By early 2016, there were also widespread allegations, later investigated by the Zondo Commission, that the Gupta family had acquired immense corrupt influence over Zuma's administration, amounting to state capture. Several weeks after Deputy President Cyril Ramaphosa was elected to succeed Zuma as ANC president in December 2017, the ANC National Executive Committee recalled Zuma. After a fifth vote of no confidence in Parliament, he resigned on 14 February 2018 and was replaced by Ramaphosa the next day.

Shortly after his resignation, on 16 March 2018, the National Prosecuting Authority announced that it would reinstate corruption charges against Zuma in relation to the 1999 Arms Deal. He pleaded not guilty on 26 May 2021, but the trial was not scheduled to take place until early 2023. The trial has since been set for April 2025. In a separate matter, in June 2021, the Constitutional Court convicted Zuma of contempt of court for his failure to comply with a court order compelling his testimony before the Zondo Commission. He was sentenced to 15 months' imprisonment and was arrested on 7 July 2021 in Estcourt, KwaZulu-Natal. However, he was released on medical parole two months later on 5 September. The high court rescinded his parole on 15 December. The parole was declared unlawful by the Supreme Court of Appeal, but it allowed the Department of Correctional Services to consider whether to deduct the time spent under it from his sentence. On 11 August 2023, the Department of Correctional Services granted Zuma remission of his 15-month sentence.

== Early life ==
Zuma was born in Nkandla, Natal Province (now part of the province of KwaZulu-Natal), and often moved around Natal and the suburbs of Durban as a child. His father, Nobhekisisa, was a policeman who died when Zuma was five, and his mother, Geinamazwi, was a domestic worker. His middle name, Gedleyihlekisa, means "one who smiles while causing you harm" in Zulu. He did not receive formal schooling.

He has at least three brothers—Michael, Joseph, and Khanya—and at least one sister—Velephi. Michael Zuma was employed by Khumbula Property Services, a construction company, and in 2011 admitted to using his elder brother Jacob's political status to secure a government contract for the company in exchange for a homestead in Nkandla.

== Anti-apartheid activism ==
=== Imprisonment and exile ===
Zuma began engaging in anti-apartheid politics at an early age and joined the ANC in 1959. He became an active member of uMkhonto we Sizwe in 1962, two years after the ANC was banned. That year, he was arrested with a group of 45 recruits near Zeerust in western Transvaal, currently part of the North West Province. Zuma was convicted of conspiring to overthrow the apartheid government and was sentenced to ten years imprisonment, which he served on Robben Island with Nelson Mandela and other notable ANC leaders also imprisoned during that time. While imprisoned, Zuma was a referee for prisoners association football games, organised by the prisoners own governing body, Makana F.A.

After his release from prison, Zuma re-established ANC underground structures in Natal. He left South Africa in 1975 and was initially based in Swaziland where he met Thabo Mbeki. In Mozambique, he dealt with the arrival of thousands of exiles seeking military training in the wake of the 1976 Soweto uprising. He became a full member of the ANC National Executive Committee in 1977, and a member of the ANC's Politico-Military Council when it was formed in 1983. He was also Deputy Chief Representative of the ANC in Mozambique, a post he occupied until the signing of the Nkomati Accord between the Mozambican and South African governments in 1984. After the Accord was signed, he was appointed as ANC Chief Representative in Mozambique. In December 1986, the South African government requested that Mozambican authorities expel six senior members of the ANC, including Zuma. He was forced to leave Mozambique in January 1987, so he moved to the ANC headquarters in Lusaka, Zambia, where he was appointed Head of the ANC's underground structures, and shortly afterward was named chief of the intelligence department.

Zuma was also a member of the South African Communist Party (SACP). He joined in 1963, served briefly on the party's Politburo, and left in 1990.

=== Return from exile ===
After the ANC was unbanned in February 1990, Zuma returned to South Africa on 21 March to begin the negotiations process. He was one of the first ANC leaders to return to South Africa for negotiations. Later that year, he was elected unopposed as the ANC's Southern Natal Chairperson. Zuma, as a Zulu, became known as a leading peace broker in Natal during the political violence of this period that was concentrated in that province, and arose largely from conflict between nationalist supporters of the then Xhosa-dominated ANC and supporters of the Zulu nationalist Inkatha Freedom Party (IFP). He is also credited with having expanded the ANC's Zulu support base in Natal. At the ANC's July 1991 elective conference, Zuma stood for the post of ANC Secretary-General and lost to Cyril Ramaphosa, but was elected Deputy Secretary-General, comfortably beating Alfred Nzo and Popo Molefe in a vote.

In the 1994 general election, South Africa's first democratic election, Zuma stood as the ANC's candidate for the premiership of his newly constituted home province, KwaZulu-Natal. The ANC rose to power in the elections, with Mandela elected president and Mbeki his deputy, but lost KwaZulu-Natal to the IFP. Zuma became a member of the executive council (MEC) for economic affairs and tourism in KwaZulu-Natal. In December 1994, he was elected ANC provincial chairperson for KwaZulu-Natal, and at the ANC's 1994 elective conference he was elected national chairperson, beating Pallo Jordan and Jeff Radebe by a large margin. He held both positions until 1997, having been re-elected provincial chairperson in 1996.

== Rise to the presidency ==
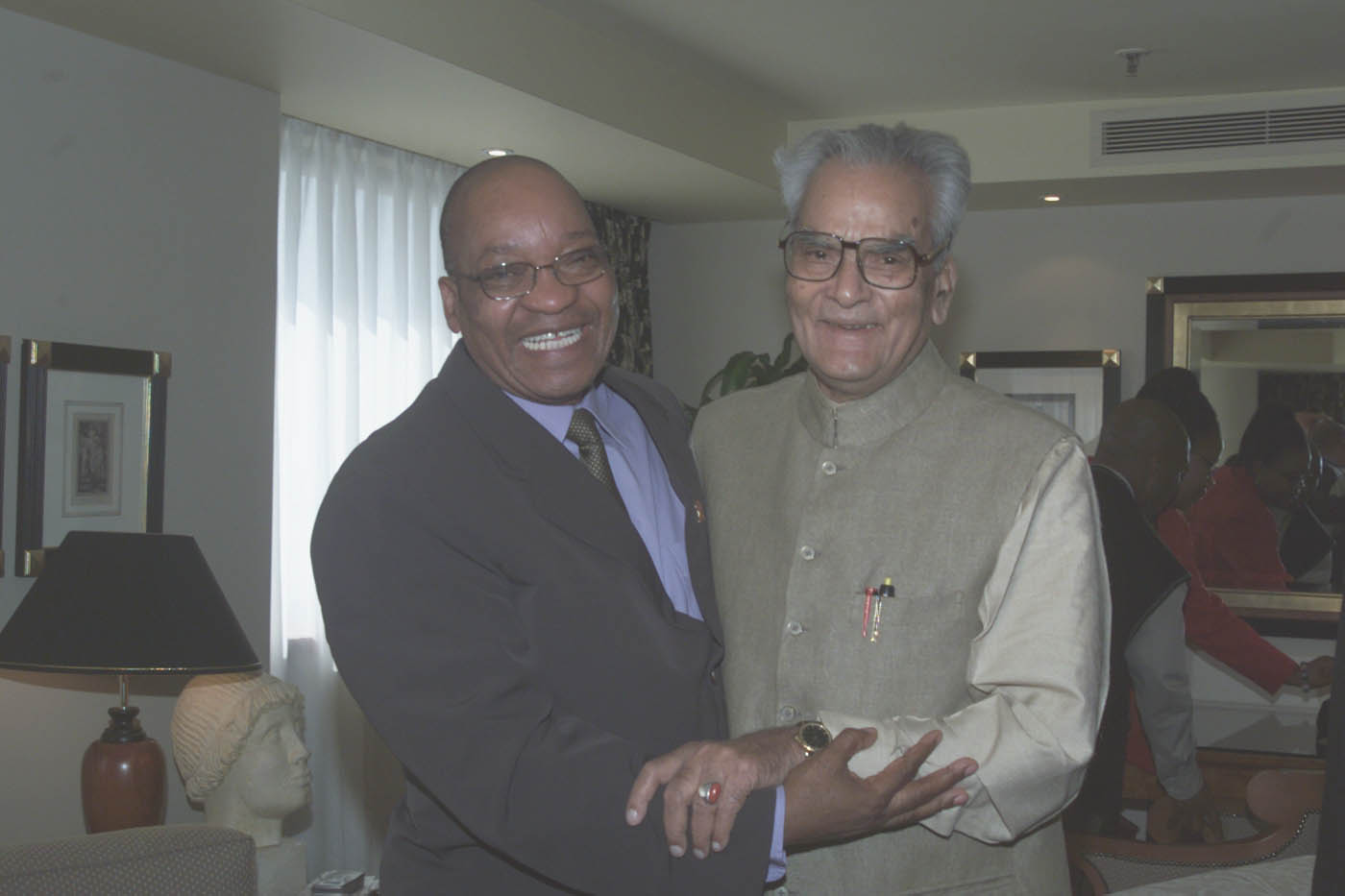
Zuma with the Indian Vice President Bhairon Singh Shekhawat in Johannesburg, 2004

=== Deputy presidency ===
Zuma was elected deputy president of the ANC at the party's 50th National Conference in Mafikeng in December 1997, and was subsequently appointed deputy president of South Africa in June 1999, pursuant to the 1999 general election. Zuma served under newly elected President Mbeki and was the chief mediator in the Burundi peace process, in which he worked with Ugandan president Yoweri Museveni, who chaired the Great Lakes Regional Initiative, a grouping of regional presidents overseeing the peace process in Burundi.

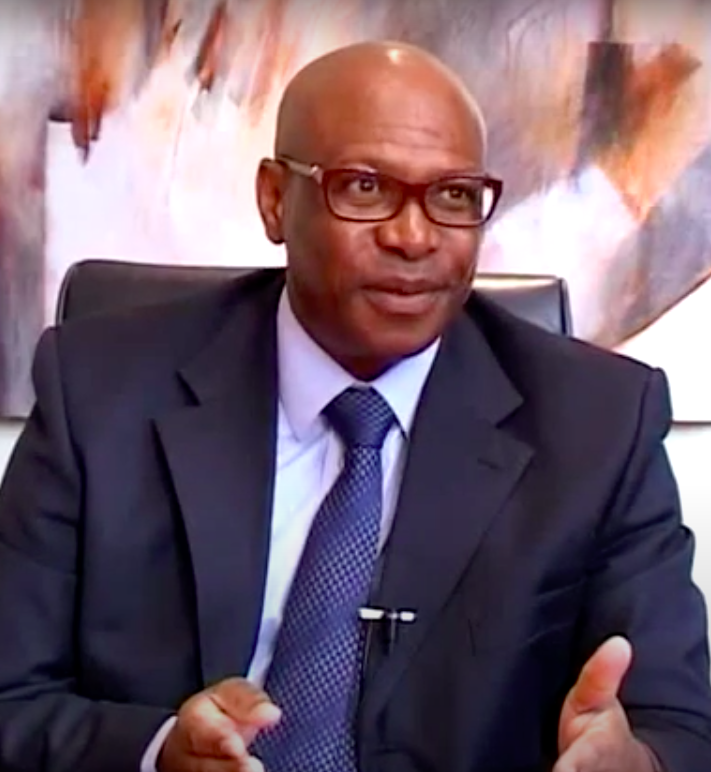
Under Bulelani Ngcuka, the NPA opened its investigation into Zuma.

In late 2002, the National Prosecuting Authority (NPA) announced that Zuma was one of several ANC politicians under investigation by the Scorpions for corruption related to the R30-billion Arms Deal, a major defence procurement package which the government had signed months after Zuma's appointment to the deputy presidency. In August 2003, however, National Director of Public Prosecutions (NDPP) Bulelani Ngcuka told the media that the NPA had a "prima facie case of corruption" against Zuma but had decided not to prosecute on the basis that the case was unlikely to be won. A highly public spat ensued between Zuma allies and Ngcuka, who was accused by Moe Shaik and Mac Maharaj of having been an apartheid spy, an accusation later dismissed by the specially appointed Hefer Commission. Zuma laid a misconduct complaint against Ngcuka with the Public Protector, Lawrence Mushwana, who in May 2004 found that Ngcuka's statement to the media had been "unfair and improper".

Mbeki and Zuma were both re-elected in the 2004 general election, but on 14 June 2005, Mbeki removed Zuma from his post as deputy president following the conviction of Zuma's associate, Schabir Shaik, for making underhanded payments to Zuma in relation to the Arms Deal. Mbeki told a joint sitting of Parliament that "in the interest of the honourable Deputy President, the government, our young democratic system and our country, it would be best to release the honourable Jacob Zuma from his responsibilities". Zuma also resigned as a member of Parliament.

His successor as deputy president of South Africa was Phumzile Mlambo-Ngcuka, Ngcuka's wife. Mlambo-Ngcuka had been minister of minerals and energy since 1999. Her appointment was booed publicly at ANC rallies by Zuma supporters, including at a Women's Day event in Utrecht, KwaZulu-Natal.

=== First corruption indictment ===
Soon after Zuma's dismissal, the NPA announced its intention to instate formal corruption charges against him. He was served with a provisional indictment on fraud and corruption charges in November 2005, mirroring the indictment earlier served on Shaik. However, the NPA was unprepared to serve the final indictment and filed an application for postponement. On 20 September 2006, the Pietermaritzburg High Court dismissed the application, and when the NPA indicated that it was not prepared to proceed with the trial, the matter was stricken off.

=== Rape trial ===
In December 2005, Zuma was charged with raping a 31-year-old woman, known to the public by the pseudonym Khwezi. The incident allegedly occurred on 2 November 2005 at Zuma's home in Forest Town, Johannesburg. When the trial began on 6 March 2006, Zuma pleaded not guilty, claiming that he and Khwezi had consensual sex. He was acquitted on 8 May 2006 following a highly publicised trial. Zuma's admission was controversial, as he stated that he had not used a condom while having sex with Khwezi, despite knowing she was HIV-positive and having been, as deputy president, the head of the National AIDS Council and Moral Regeneration Campaign. He told the court that he had taken a shower after the act, claiming that doing so reduced the risk of HIV transmission. The South African comic strip Madam & Eve, and political cartoonist Zapiro, repeatedly lampooned Zuma for his testimony, and Zuma now always appears under a showerhead in Zapiro cartoons.

=== Continued popularity ===
Although Zuma had been fired as national deputy president, he retained the ANC deputy presidency, and internal factions began to coalesce around him and Mbeki. Between 2005 and 2007, their rivalry deepened into what Susan Booysen called "a brutal and all-consuming disagreement between two major ANC groupings". Although the corruption and rape allegations were considered politically damaging, Zuma continued to enjoy considerable support from left-wing elements of the ANC, especially the ANC Youth League under Fikile Mbalula, and from the ANC's partners in the Tripartite Alliance, the SACP, and the Congress of South African Trade Unions (COSATU). Blade Nzimande of the SACP and Zwelinzima Vavi of COSATU were among Zuma's chief organisers and most vocal supporters (though both recanted their support years later). Vavi and Youth League leader Julius Malema later said that they were prepared to "kill for Zuma". Nzimande and his SACP comrade Gwede Mantashe warned that the corruption trial would endanger public stability if it went ahead, although there were reports that support for Zuma had caused a rift within the SACP. While Zuma's political strength was at least partly based on his relationships within intra-party politics and Mbeki's lack of popularity with the left wing, he also had a large Zulu support base, and one analyst argued that his supporters' loyalty was partially rooted in a traditionalist Zulu loyalty.

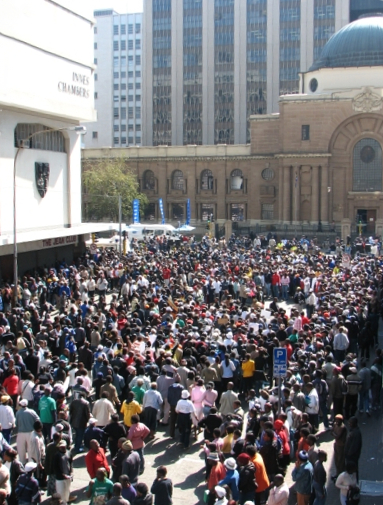
A crowd of supporters and curious onlookers outside the Johannesburg High Court during the rape trial

Zuma's supporters publicly expressed the view that his dismissal and prosecution were the result of a political conspiracy by Mbeki, who they said had sought to oust Zuma to entrench their dominance in the ANC. Zuma's court appearances on the corruption charges drew large crowds of supporters (on one estimate, up to 10,000 at a time), who, on one occasion, burned T-shirts with Mbeki's picture on them, which the ANC leadership condemned. Zuma became known for singing the apartheid-era struggle song "Umshini wami" (English: Bring Me My Machine Gun) with his supporters during these informal rallies. Likewise, during the rape trial, Zuma supporters gathered outside the courthouse and sometimes clashed with smaller groups of anti-rape protesters. Zuma supporters were seen carrying posters questioning Khwezi's integrity, burning photos of her, and on one occasion throwing stones at a woman that they mistook for her.

By October 2008, Zuma had been acquitted of rape and was no longer subject to corruption charges. However, this did little to lighten the rivalry between Mbeki and Zuma. A Mail & Guardian analysis stated:

The political damage [of events of recent months] is incalculable, with the ruling African National Congress now an openly divided and faltering movement. This has had a domino effect on the South African Communist Party and the Congress of South African Trade Unions, which have floundered and fractured in the face of damaging charges against a man they ardently backed as the country's next president. The trial has been fought against the backdrop of a bitter succession war between Mbeki and Zuma. Both have been fatally wounded. Mbeki's support in the ANC has crumbled... But even Zuma's most diehard supporters privately acknowledge that he cannot now be president...

=== Defamation lawsuits ===
By early 2006 during the rape trial, Zuma and his supporters complained of a concerted media plot to discredit him and harm his political career. In March, he appointed a legal team, including former Conservative Party politician Jurg Prinsloo and advocate Wycliffe Mothuloe, to fight his "crucifixion by the media". Among his targets was the Sowetan, whom he told that the media, at the instruction of Ngcuka of the NPA and former Justice Minister Penuell Maduna, was trying to "crucify" him. The newspaper had printed the interview under the headline "I'm like Christ – Zuma". In June and July 2006, Zuma filed a series of defamation lawsuits against various South African media outlets for publishing content that allegedly besmirched his public profile in the form of cartoons, commentary, photos and parody pieces. The defendants included the Star (sued for R20 million), Rapport (R10 million), Highveld Stereo (R7 million), the Sunday Times (R6 million), the Citizen (R5 million), the Sunday Sun (R5 million), the Sunday Independent (R5 million), and the Sunday World (R5 million). Zuma said in 2005:

For a period of five years my person has been subjected to all types of allegations and innuendo, paraded through the media and other corridors of influence without these allegations having being [sic] tested. I have thereby been denied my constitutional right to reply and defend myself.

In December 2008, Zuma sued Zapiro for R7 million over his controversial rape of Lady Justice cartoon, bringing the total value of the defamation lawsuits to at least R70 million, an unprecedented figure in South African law. Many of the suits were withdrawn or settled out of court. Rapport settled for R50,000 over a defamatory reader's letter, and the British Guardian newspaper also paid Zuma substantial damages over defamatory statements.

=== Election as ANC president ===
As per party tradition, Zuma was in line to succeed Mbeki as head of the party. However, by April 2007 it was clear that Mbeki intended to run for a third term as ANC president. Even though he was prohibited by the Constitution from standing again for the national presidency, the ANC lacks internal term limits. Zuma gained the support of five of the nine provincial ANC branches when they nominated candidates at their provincial congresses in late 2007. He became the favourite to win the presidency and became the ANC's presidential candidate in the 2009 elections. While the ANC was extremely likely to win regardless of its candidate, there were reports that Zuma's support base and left-wing alliances unnerved international and domestic investors.

On 18 December 2007, at the ANC's 52nd National Conference in Polokwane, Limpopo, Zuma was elected ANC president, beating Mbeki with 2,329 votes to 1,505.

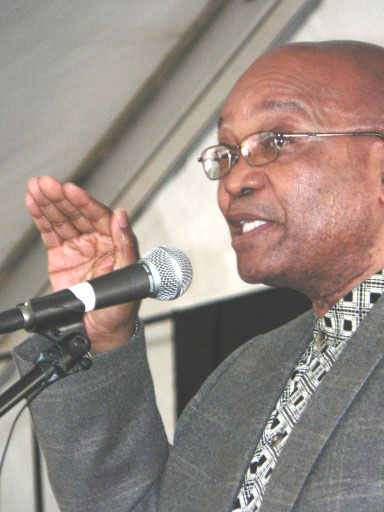
Zuma in June 2008

=== Second corruption indictment ===
Just over a week after the Polokwane conference, the NPA reinstated charges against Zuma and served him an indictment to stand trial on 12 fraud charges, two corruption charges, and one charge each of racketeering and money laundering. According to the Constitution, he would have been rendered ineligible for the national presidency had he been convicted and sentenced to imprisonment. However, on 12 September 2008, the charges were declared unlawful on a technicality. The presiding judge also expressed a belief that the charges had been the result of a political conspiracy against Zuma.

Although this judgement was later overturned by the appellate court, the Zuma-aligned ANC National Executive, as elected at the Polokwane conference, immediately "recalled" Mbeki, asking him to resign as national president. Mbeki, seeking to avoid a protracted dispute, did so, and was replaced by newly elected ANC Deputy President Kgalema Motlanthe, who led an interim administration while Zuma campaigned for the 2009 election.

In January 2009, the Supreme Court of Appeal found that the charges against Zuma were not unlawful, contrary to the ruling of the lower court. However, the NPA formally withdrew the charges in the same week that Zuma was inaugurated as national president, citing apparent evidence of prosecutorial misconduct in the so-called spy tapes.

=== Release of Shaik on parole ===
In March 2009, Shaik was controversially released from prison on medical parole, just over two years into his 15-year sentence. Earlier the same week, Zuma had said publicly that as national president he would pardon Shaik on medical grounds, and denied having played any role in Shaik's release. Shaik had applied for a presidential pardon in April 2008 when Mbeki was president, and he continued to lobby for a pardon during Zuma's presidency, saying it was unfair that he had been convicted while neither Zuma nor the implicated arms company had been taken to trial.

== President of South Africa (2009–2018) ==
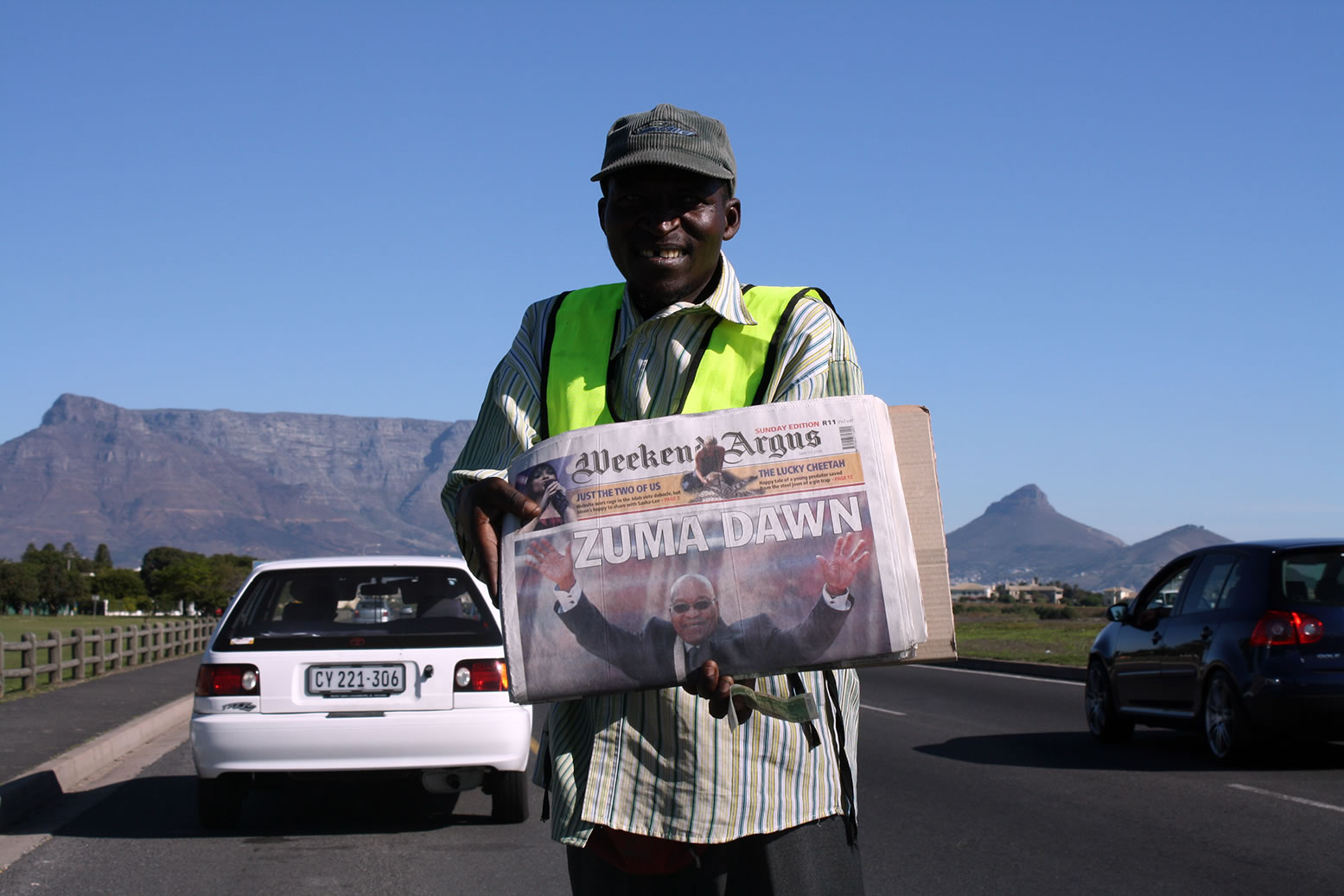
A Cape Town news vendor displays the headline "Zuma Dawn" on 10 May 2009.

The ANC won the national election on 22 April 2009 by a slightly diminished majority of 65.90%, with Zuma having campaigned under the theme "Continuity and Change". His appointment was formalised by Parliament on 6 May, and he was sworn in as president of South Africa on 9 May 2009.

=== Failure to disclose assets ===
As president and therefore a member of cabinet, Zuma was required by the government's ethics code to declare his financial interests within 60 days of taking office. In March 2010, nine months after taking office, South African media reported that he had failed to do so. Opposition parties and the ANC's Tripartite Alliance partner COSATU urged Zuma to disclose his interests, and the opposition Democratic Alliance (DA) called for an investigation by the Public Protector. ANC spokesperson Brian Sokutu explained that Zuma constituted a "special case" because of his "large family", which complicated the process. The ANC distanced itself from Sokutu's statement and Zuma filed the disclosure later that week.

=== Domestic policy ===
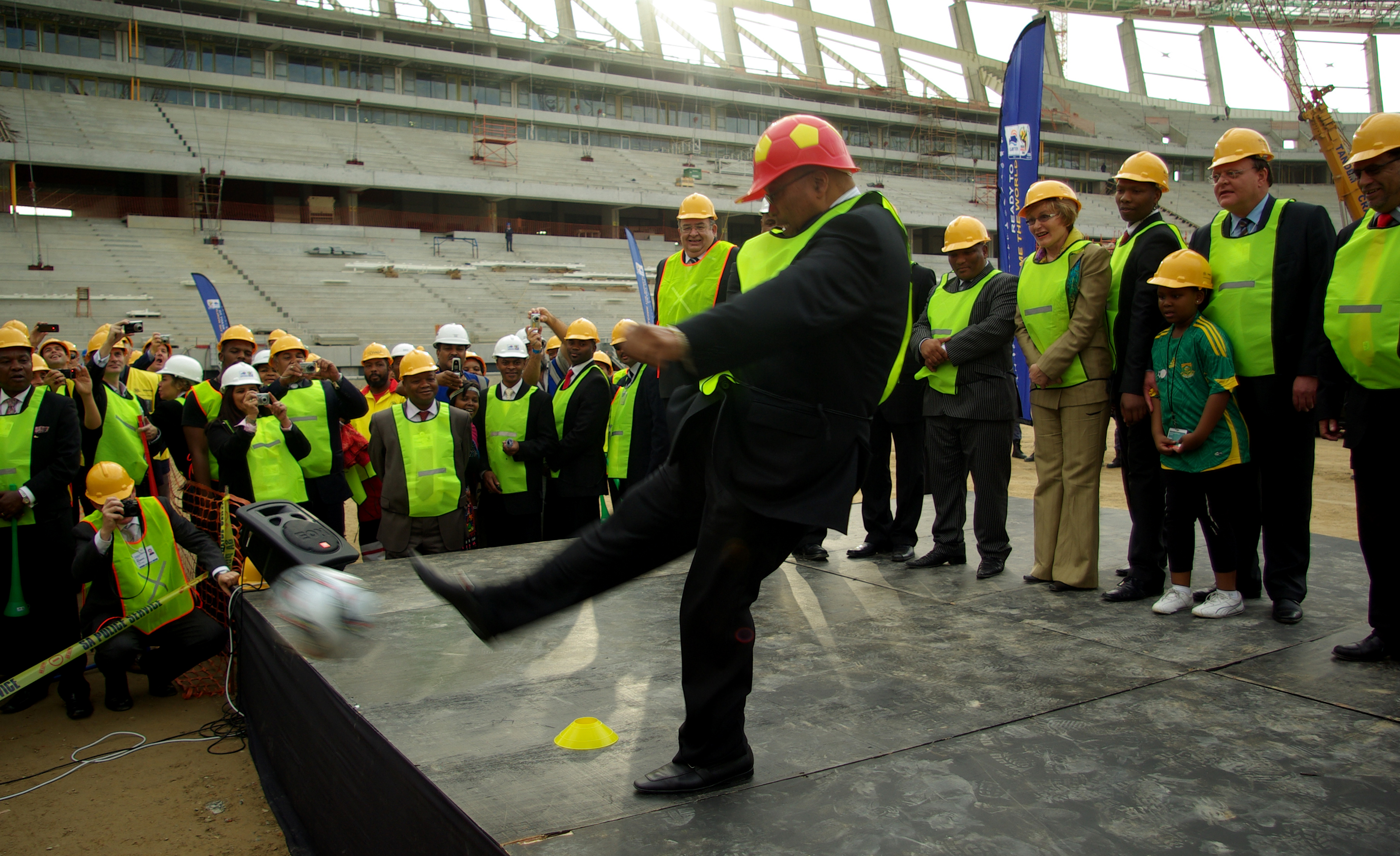
Zuma (centre) on a tour of Green Point Stadium in June 2009, in preparation for the 2010 FIFA World Cup

==== Radical economic transformation ====
As a former member of the SACP, Zuma has described himself as a socialist and became president with the support of a left-wing coalition. Analysts have claimed that he has bolstered populism in South Africa. From 2017, at the tail-end of his presidency, his rhetoric and policy priorities became more leftist under what is known as the "radical economic transformation" (RET) programme of the ANC of this period. Zuma announced the new focus on RET during his February 2017 State of the Nation address. Later that year, he explained that RET had been adopted as ANC policy and therefore as government policy, and defined it as a "fundamental change in the structures, systems, institutions and patterns of ownership and control of the economy, in favour of all South Africans, especially the poor". The RET policy was controversial, and some critics claimed that it had popular political appeal but lacked substance. Others claimed that it was used to defend "rent-seeking practices" and the influence of the Gupta family on Zuma's administration. Zuma claimed that critics of his politics were agents of "white monopoly capital".

==== Economic reform and spending ====
Zuma was inaugurated in South Africa at during the 2008 financial crisis and the first recession in South Africa since the end of apartheid. Upon taking office, he established the National Planning Commission under the office of the presidency which was chaired by Minister Trevor Manuel. It was responsible for developing the National Development Plan, which was adopted by Zuma's cabinet in 2012. Other major initiatives included the Independent Power Producers Procurement Programme, which was launched in 2011 amid electricity generation shortfalls at state energy utility Eskom, and a R4-trillion National Infrastructure Plan launched in 2012. Zuma expressed support for expanding South Africa's nuclear power programme, particularly for a nuclear deal with Russian nuclear agency Rosatom which concluded in September 2014 but was ruled unlawful by the Western Cape High Court in 2017.

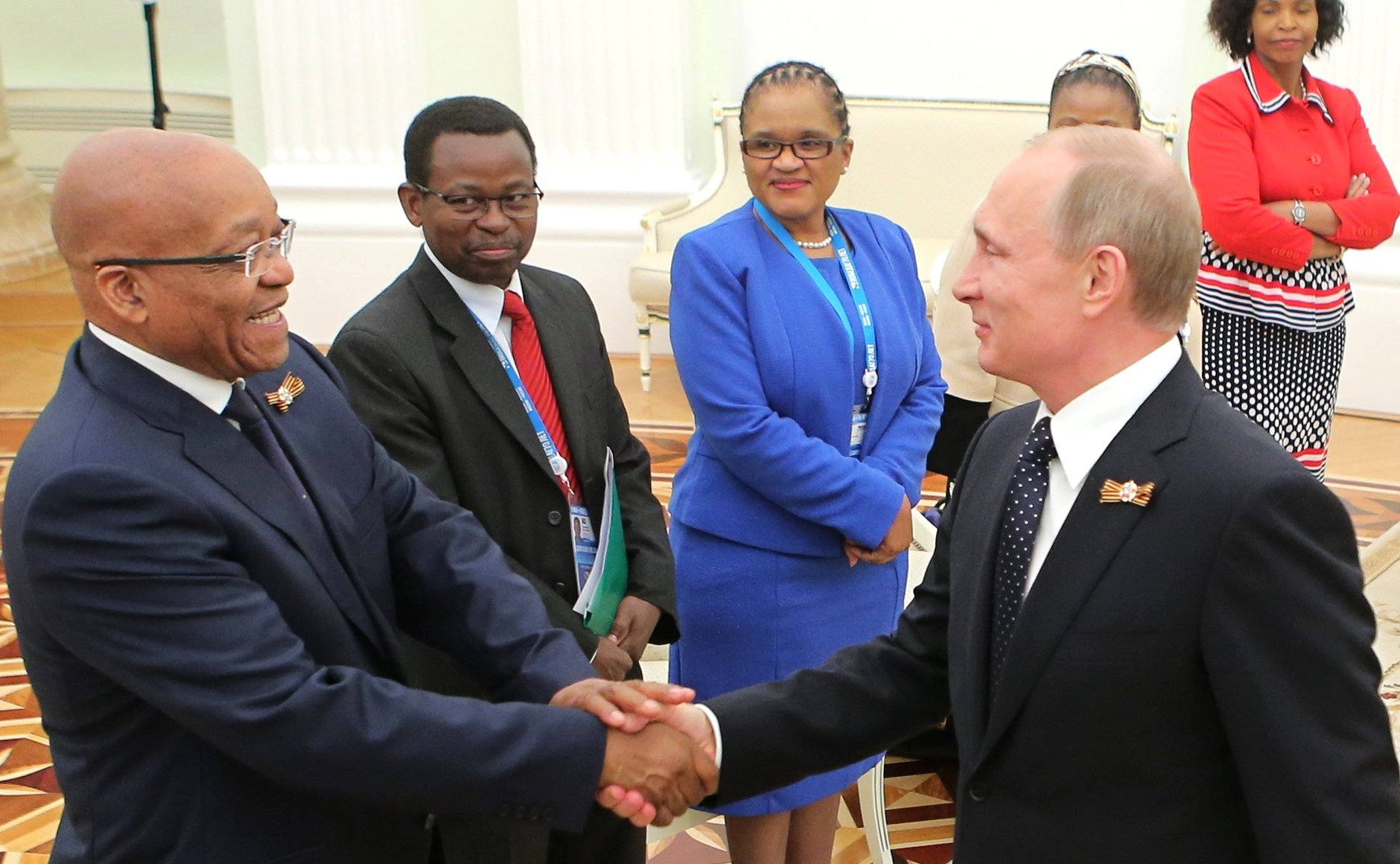
Zuma greets Russian President Vladimir Putin in 2015.

Zuma's administration pursued a number of structural economic policy reforms, but critics characterised them as "investor-unfriendly", and most were met significant opposition. His reforms included the increased regulation of private security companies. He also increased the regulation of oil, gas, and minerals resources. Furthermore, Zuma announced a proposal to increase black economic empowerment ownership requirements in mines. In 2017, Zuma advanced a proposal for the introduction of a national minimum wage.

Zuma was attentive to land reform issues throughout his second term, but from 2017 he emphasised his support for land expropriation without compensation. While opening the ANC's 54th National Conference in December 2017, he unilaterally announced that higher education would be free for students in households whose income was less than R350,000 per year, meeting a central demand of the #FeesMustFall student protests.

South Africa's social grants programme expanded under Zuma, and Zuma was praised for his HIV/AIDS policy which has been credited with increasing life expectancy in South Africa. However, his critics claim that his policies increased South Africa's debt burden with the debt-to-GDP ratio increasing from 28% at the start of his presidency to just over 50% in the week of his resignation. Nedbank, one of South Africa's largest banks, estimates that poor policy decisions, maladministration, and corruption during Zuma's second term alone cost the South African economy R470 billion (US$33.7 billion).

Contracts with the consulting firms McKinsey & Company, KPMG, and Deloitte were linked to alleged corruption in state-owned enterprises. McKinsey & Company eventually reached an agreement with the South African government and paid back R1 Billion (US$67.3 million) for problems relating to work done at Eskom, as well as a company linked to the Gupta family. In January 2022 the South African government published the findings of an inquiry into state capture and the consultancy firm Bain & Company stands accused of helping Zuma to undermine the South African tax authority.

=== Foreign policy ===
Zuma's first state visit as president was to Angola, where he sought to improve relations with the government of President José Eduardo dos Santos, who had had a tense relationship with Mbeki. His government's foreign policy emphasised the developmental objectives of African and Global South countries with a focus on economic diplomacy. It was also characterised by a pivot towards the BRIC countries, especially China. In December 2010, South Africa became a formal member of the BRIC organisation, which was subsequently renamed BRICS, and Zuma attended the group's third summit meeting in Sanya, China, in 2011. South Africa's admission followed a concerted campaign for membership and has been described as "a huge diplomatic coup" and "the most important foreign policy achievement of the Zuma administration".

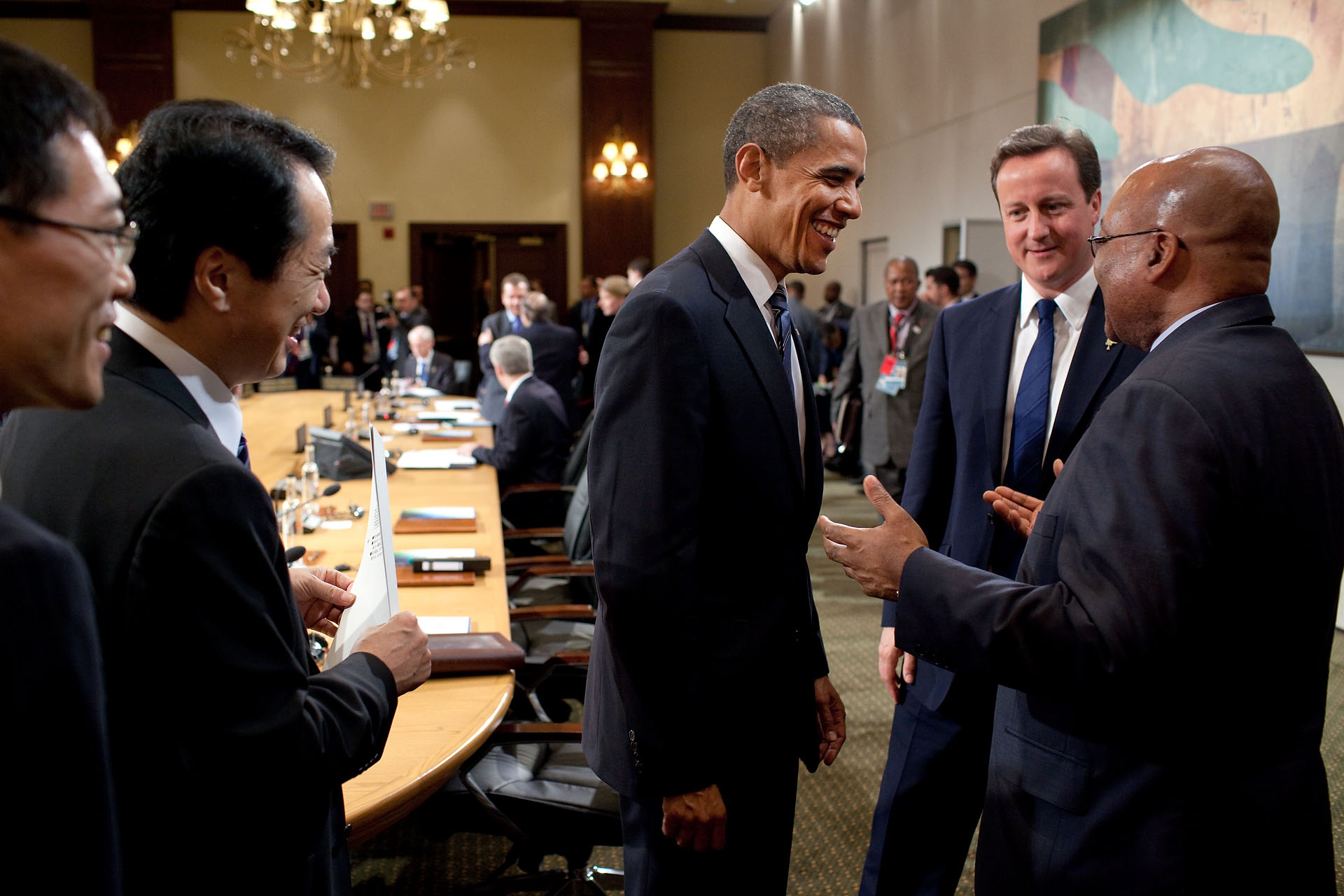
Zuma speaks with Barack Obama and David Cameron at a G8 African Outreach meeting in 2010.

During South Africa's tenure on the United Nations Security Council, Zuma's administration was criticised for deviating in its stance on certain foreign regimes, especially in its attitudes towards international intervention in civil conflicts. It voted in favour of Resolution 1970 and Resolution 1973 but condemned their use by the North Atlantic Treaty Organisation (NATO) as the basis for military intervention in Libya. It also voted in favour of a 2012 resolution calling for Syrian President Bashar al-Assad to step down, but established friendly relations with the Assad regime after the 2014 Syrian presidential election. The administration also appeared to vacillate in its response to the disputed 2010 presidential election in Côte d'Ivoire.

==== Zimbabwe ====
In Zimbabwe, Mbeki had advocated for non-confrontational "quiet diplomacy" as an alternative to the "megaphone diplomacy" used by Western governments that harshly criticised Robert Mugabe's regime. This approach was controversial, with elements of the ruling alliance calling for a tougher stance against Mugabe and the ruling ZANU–PF. In a 2006 interview with Der Spiegel, Zuma had supported quiet diplomacy and said of Mugabe:

The Europeans often ignore the fact that Mugabe is very popular among Africans... The people love him. So how can we condemn him? Many in Africa believe that there is a racist aspect to European and American criticism of Mugabe. Millions of blacks died in Angola, the Republic of Congo and Rwanda. A few whites lost their lives in Zimbabwe, unfortunately, and already the West is bent out of shape.

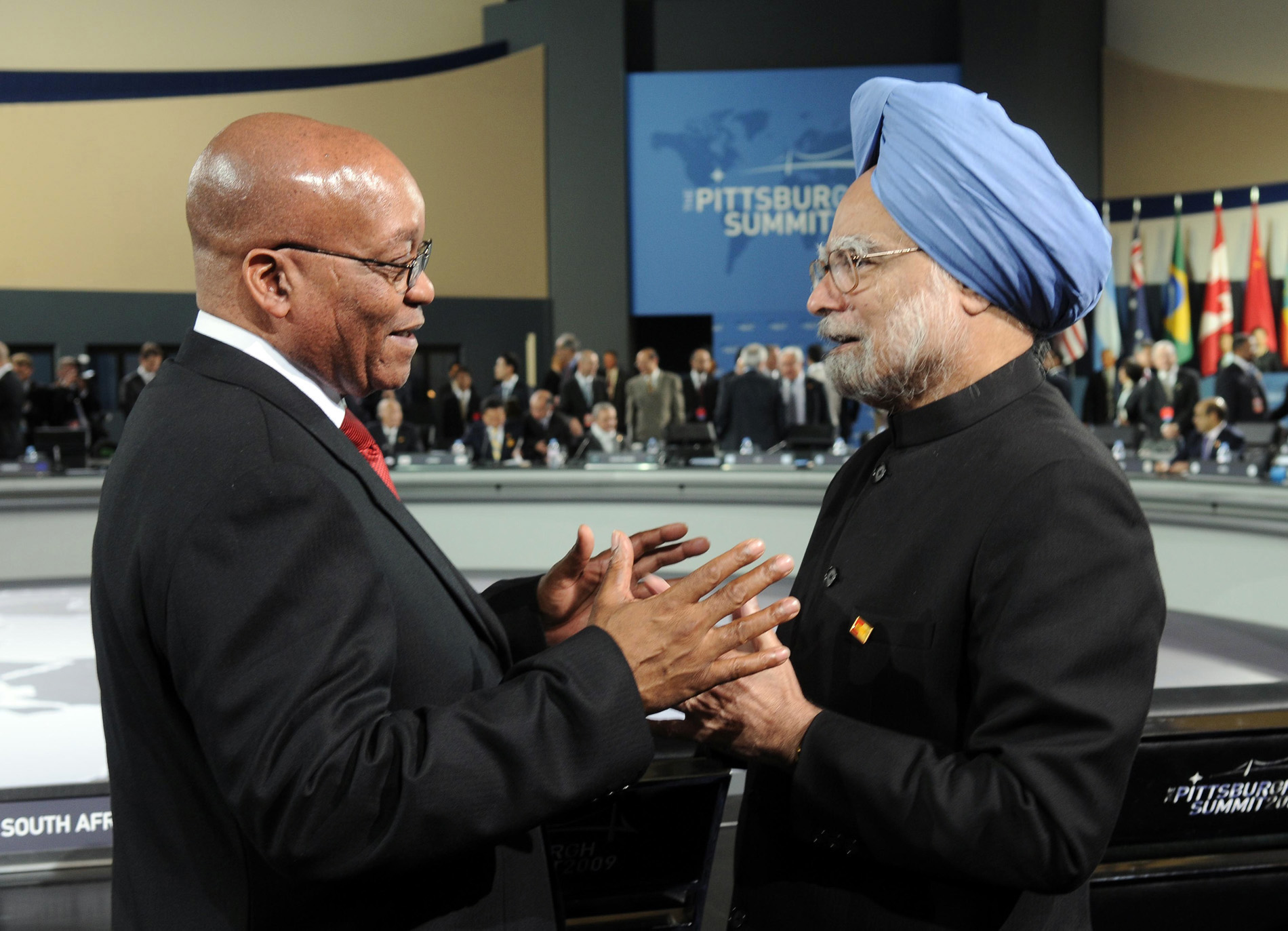
Zuma and Indian Prime Minister Manmohan Singh at the 2009 G20 summit

By December 2007, Zuma was more forthcoming in criticising Zimbabwe's leadership, contrasting his own policy to Mbeki's, and observing that it was "tragic that other world leaders who witness repression pretend it is not happening, or is exaggerated". He was critical of the Zimbabwean government's behaviour during the disputed March 2008 elections in Zimbabwe and called the delays "suspicious". In a press conference on 24 June he said, "We cannot agree with ZANU-PF. We cannot agree with them on values. We fought for the right of people to vote, we fought for democracy." At an ANC dinner in July, he rebuked Mugabe for refusing to step down, and in November he said that the South African Development Community (SADC) should "force" Zimbabwean leaders to reach an agreement, if necessary.

In 2010, Zuma called for international sanctions against Mugabe and his allies to be lifted. After a March 2013 meeting with Mugabe in Pretoria, he highlighted the commonalities between his and Mugabe's political parties, telling the press, "We share the same values, we went through the same route... We believe that our positions as former liberation movements need to be consolidated." Despite tensions in later months, as Zuma and SADC attempted to nudge Mugabe towards democratic reforms, the Business Day reported that relations between the countries remained "cordial" throughout Zuma's presidency.

==== International Criminal Court ====
South Africa hosted the 25th Summit of the AU in Johannesburg from 7 to 15 June 2015. It was attended by Sudanese president Omar al-Bashir, then a fugitive from the International Criminal Court (ICC), which sought to prosecute him on charges of genocide and crimes against humanity. South Africa was a signatory to the Rome Statute, which obliged it to arrest al-Bashir, but instead granted him diplomatic immunity while he attended the summit. While the matter was being adjudicated by a South African High Court, and just after Judge President Dunstan Mlambo ordered al-Bashir's arrest, the state's lawyer told the court that he had left the country. His plane left from Waterkloof Air Force Base, presumably with the government's knowledge and reportedly with Zuma's explicit approval. When it was criticised for this breach, the South African government argued that the ICC was used unfairly against African heads of state while failing to hold Western leaders to the same standards. In 2016, it announced in New York that it was withdrawing from the ICC, and Zuma's administration subsequently tabled legislation to effect the withdrawal.

=== Mandela's memorial ===
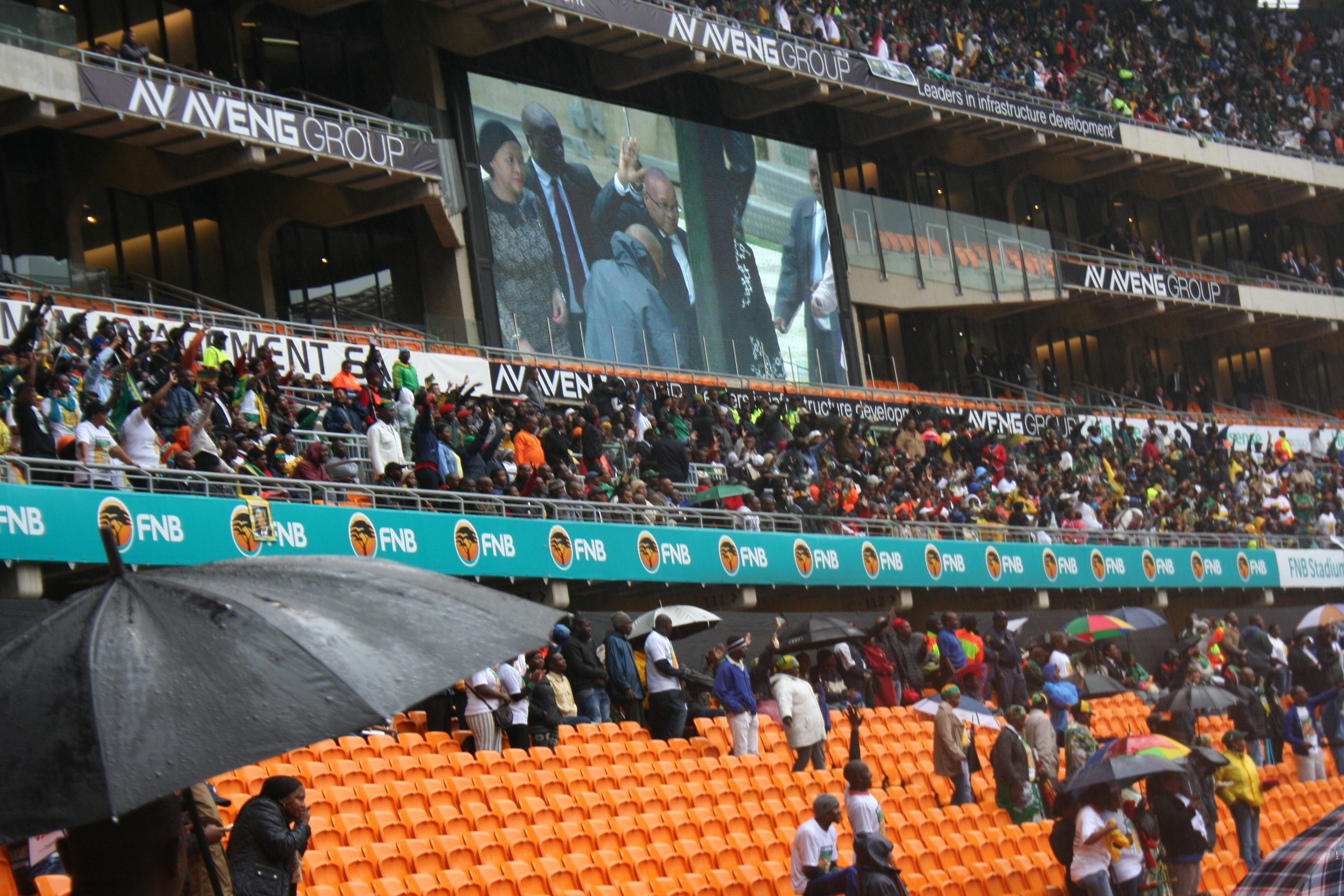
A jumbotron shows Zuma entering Mandela's memorial on 10 December 2013.

In a press conference on 5 December 2013, Zuma announced the death of Nelson Mandela, South Africa's first democratically elected president. The memorial took place on 10 December 2013 at FNB Stadium near Soweto. When Zuma entered the stadium parts of the crowd booed him loudly. Ramaphosa and Archbishop Desmond Tutu called for discipline, with Ramaphosa telling the crowd in Zulu that the country could address its internal disagreements when foreign dignitaries were not present. Some South African commentators said that the crowd's actions were unexpected, and they were widely linked to the ongoing Nkandla scandal, a draft of the Public Protector's provisional report had been leaked the previous week, or to dissatisfaction with Zuma's administration more generally. Others suggested that the booing reflected frustration with the lack of socioeconomic change under the ANC government since Mandela's presidency, or that it reflected enduring divisions within the ANC; the crowd also chanted Mbeki's name. In a public statement, the ANC chastised those who had booed, saying they had embarrassed the country. The South African Broadcasting Corporation (SABC) was criticised for having cut away from the booing in its live broadcast of the memorial.

=== Re-election ===
Despite an "Anyone but Zuma" campaign in the run-up to the ANC's 53rd National Conference, Zuma was re-elected ANC president on 18 December 2012, beating Deputy President Kgalema Motlanthe by a large margin. Although in 2008 he had said that he would prefer to serve only one term as president, Zuma became the ANC's sole presidential candidate in the 2014 national election. In January 2014, after he was heckled at Mandela's memorial, the Sunday Tribune reported that around November 2013, KwaZulu-Natal branches of the ANC had discussed a proposed resolution asking Zuma not to run for a second term as the country's president. However, ANC Deputy Secretary General Jessie Duarte dismissed rumours of disunity in the ANC saying, "The policy is that the president of the ANC is always the candidate for the election. We don't have another candidate and there will be no other candidate."

The ANC retained its majority in the national election, and on 21 May 2014, the National Assembly elected Zuma to a second term as president.

=== Nkandla homestead ===
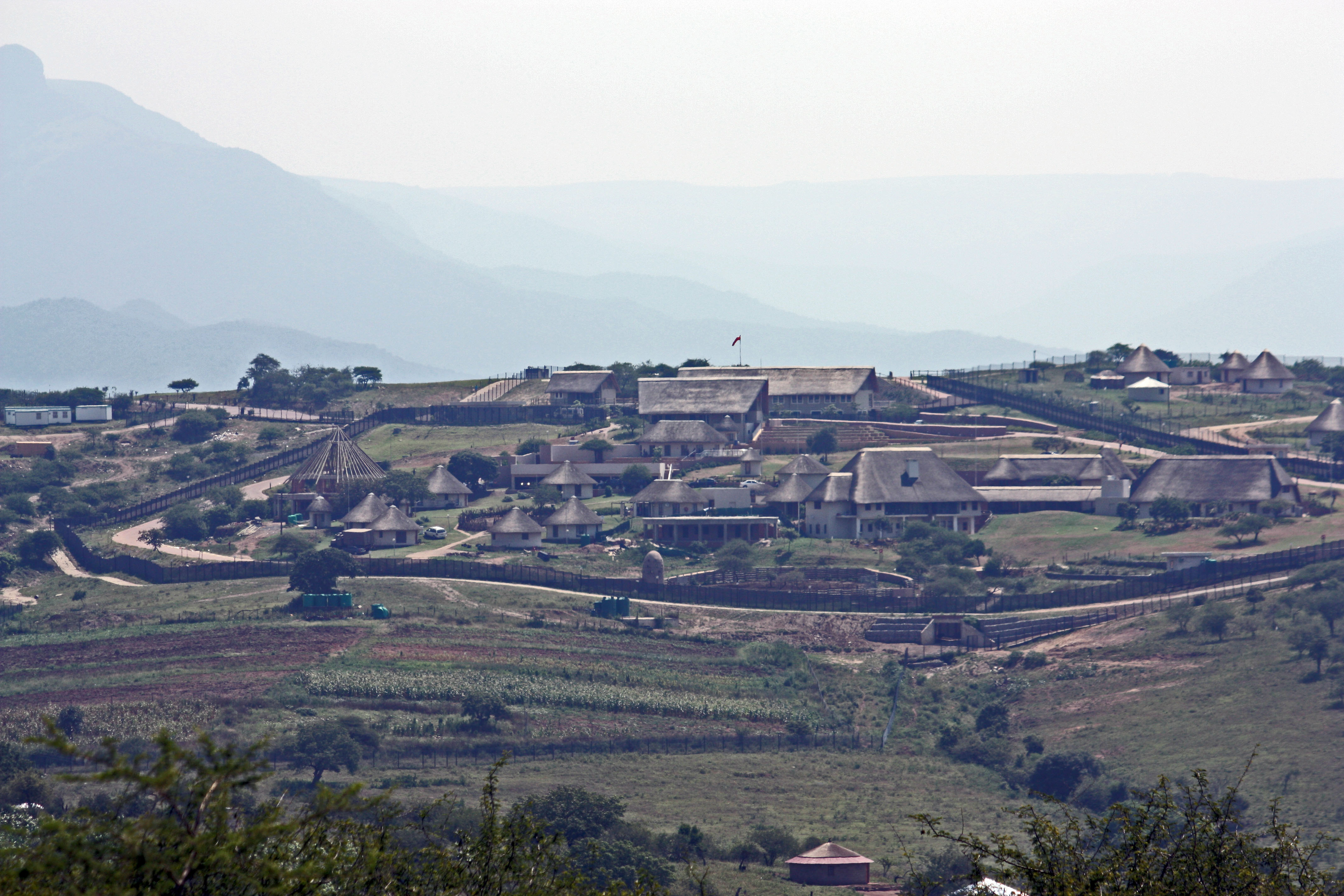
Zuma's Nkandla homestead in KwaZulu-Natal

Zuma began his second term amid ongoing controversy over what were officially security upgrades made with state funds to his private homestead at Nkandla. Public Protector Thuli Madonsela investigated, and in late November 2013 her draft report was leaked to the Mail & Guardian. Similar to the final version of the report, titled "Secure in Comfort" and released on 19 March 2014, the draft found that some of the Nkandla upgrades exceeded Zuma's security needs and recommended that Zuma should repay the state. The opposition, Economic Freedom Fighters (EFF), and DA applied for legal recourse to compel Zuma to follow the recommendations in Madonsela's report, and the Constitutional Court found in their favour on 31 March 2016. In EFF v Speaker; DA v Speaker, the full court agreed that Madonsela's report was binding, meaning Zuma was required to repay the state for some of the Nkandla upgrades and that Zuma had failed to uphold the country's Constitution. In a public address on 1 April, Zuma welcomed the judgment and apologised to the country, though legal academic Pierre de Vos said that the statement seriously misconstrued the judgment.

The court's finding that Zuma had failed to uphold the Constitution subsequently provided the basis of an impeachment motion in Parliament, which was sponsored by the DA and defeated by a significant margin. However, Zuma faced serious backlash in the aftermath of the Constitutional Court ruling, including criticism from the SACP, civil society, several ANC stalwarts (including Ahmed Kathrada, Ronnie Kasrils, Trevor Manuel, and Cheryl Carolus), and several active factions of the ANC. Before the ruling, Zuma had faced and defeated five motions of no confidence in Parliament, three of which went to a vote. Following the ruling and failed impeachment motion, he faced three more in November 2016, August 2017, and February 2018.

=== State capture allegations ===
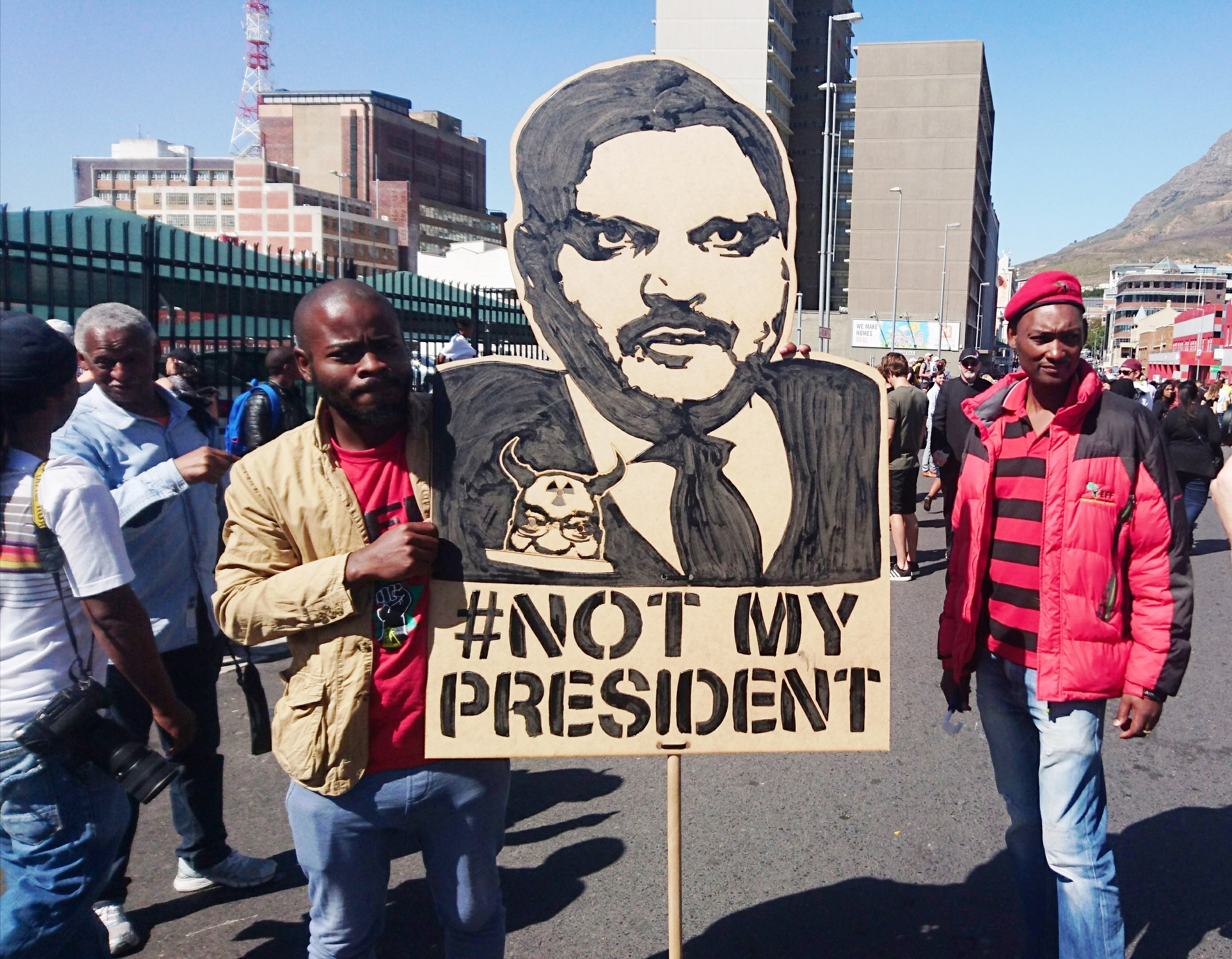
Two EFF supporters carry a placard depicting Atul Gupta at a Zuma Must Fall protest in Cape Town, April 2017.

Zuma's close and allegedly corrupt relationship with the Gupta family, known ANC donors, became a major source of discontent both within the ANC and among the South African public. This relationship received widespread public attention in April 2013 when the media reported that the Guptas had landed an Airbus A330 at Waterkloof Air Force Base without formal authorisation, but was welcomed by a police escort. The political influence of the Guptas was one issue that was thought to have motivated a wave of anti-government protests in October 2015, and at Zuma's February 2016 State of the Nation address, the EFF coined the phrase "Zupta", a portmanteau of "Zuma" and "Gupta", when they disrupted the event by repeatedly chanting "Zupta must fall."

In March 2016, allegations of state capture of the Zuma administration by the Gupta family were revived when two ANC politicians, Mcebisi Jonas and Vytjie Mentor, publicly claimed that the Guptas had offered them cabinet positions. The Guptas denied the allegations, as did Zuma who reminded Parliament that only he had the power to appoint ministers. Shortly thereafter, the former director-general of the Government Communication and Information System, Themba Maseko, told the Sunday Times that Zuma had asked him to "help" the Guptas and that the Guptas had subsequently asked him to channel government advertising tenders to their newspaper, the New Age.

In mid-March 2016, Madonsela launched an investigation into state capture, resulting in a report entitled "State of Capture" in November 2017. The report found prima facie evidence implicating Zuma and other state officials in various improprieties, including improper relationships with the Gupta family. It also recommended that Zuma should appoint a full commission of inquiry into state capture. Zuma applied to have Madonsela's report overturned in the high court, which dismissed his application and ordered him to appoint a commission. In January 2018, just over a month before he resigned, he established the Zondo Commission.

In June 2026 Zuma was photographed at a Hindu temple in Haridwar, northern India, alongside Ajay Gupta who is still a wanted fugitive in South Africa. Zuma was also accompaniedd by South Africa’s High Commissioner to India, Professor Anil Sooklal who now faces investigation for his part.

=== Cabinet reshuffles ===
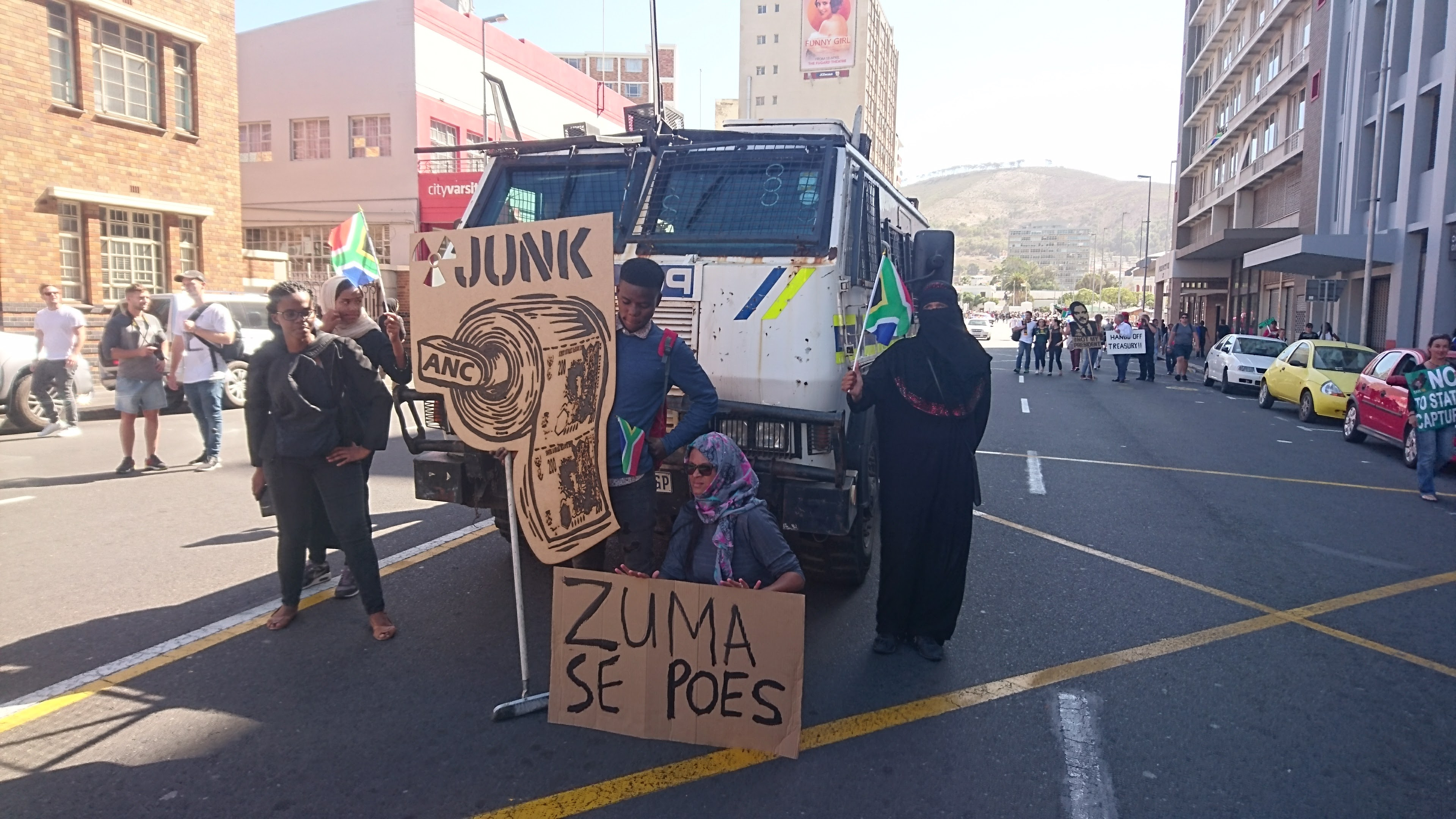
Insulting posters at the Zuma Must Fall protest in Cape Town, 7 April 2017

Zuma was criticised for a lack of stability in his cabinet. During his two terms in office, he implemented twelve cabinet reshuffles, and some of his appointments unsettled financial markets, such as when Finance Minister Nhlanhla Nene was replaced with the little-known backbencher Des van Rooyen in the 9 December 2015 reshuffle. The political response was so hostile that van Rooyen was replaced by Pravin Gordhan after four days in office. Later, on 31 March 2017, Gordhan was sacked and replaced by Malusi Gigaba. Gordhan's deputy Jonas, who had alleged corruption by the Guptas a year earlier, was also fired. The reshuffle was criticised by senior ANC leaders including Deputy President Ramaphosa, from the SACP, and from members of the public, who, on 7 April, launched protests against Zuma and his government in several of South Africa's major cities. Another march on the Union Buildings on 12 April, Zuma's birthday, was organised by a coalition of seven opposition parties. It attracted tens of thousands of protesters and the Mail & Guardian said that it was "possibly the largest march in post-apartheid history".

=== Succession ===
==== Succession as ANC president ====
From 2015, Zuma was understood to favour his ex-wife, Nkosazana Dlamini-Zuma, to succeed him as ANC president and therefore, presumptively, as national president. His critics claimed that he would use his relationship with Dlamini-Zuma to retain control of the ANC and the state, and avoid prosecution on corruption charges. She campaigned on a platform of economic transformation – so that the pro-Dlamini-Zuma faction became known as the RET faction – while her challenger, Ramaphosa, emphasised anti-corruption. On 18 December 2017, at the ANC's 54th National Conference, Ramaphosa narrowly beat Dlamini-Zuma in a vote and succeeded Zuma as ANC president.

==== Resignation ====
Once Ramaphosa replaced Zuma as ANC president, there was growing pressure for the latter to resign from the national presidency. On 6 February 2018, Zuma's annual State of the Nation Address, scheduled for 8 February, was postponed indefinitely "to create room for establishing a much more conducive political atmosphere". The following week, Ramaphosa and Zuma spent almost five days in talks. On 12 December, when it became clear that the negotiations had failed, the ANC National Executive Committee convened an emergency meeting near Pretoria, and, after nearly ten hours of debate, decided that Zuma should be "recalled" by the party if he did not resign voluntarily. Ramaphosa and another senior official reportedly drove to Zuma's home just after midnight to deliver the ultimatum, but Zuma refused, insisting on a three-month notice period or transition period before leaving office. On 13 December, the National Executive Committee publicly announced its intention to recall Zuma. As a party-political body, it formally lacked the authority to remove sitting presidents, though it could instruct the ANC caucus, which controlled Parliament, to remove Zuma through a motion of no confidence if he did not resign at its request.

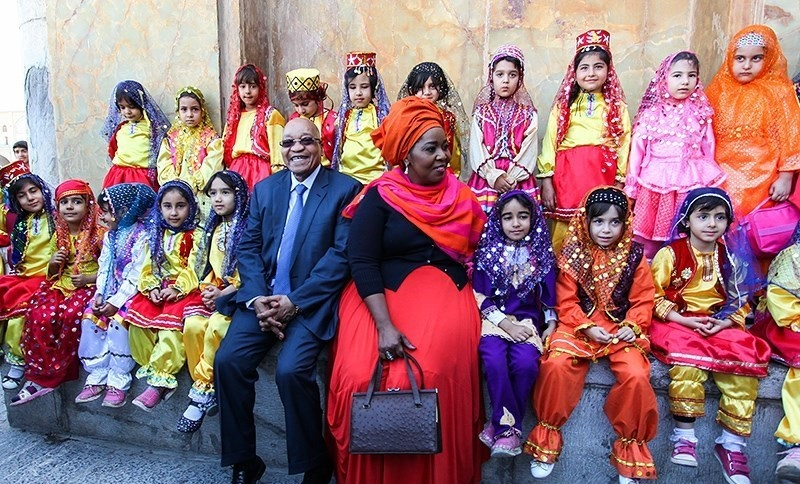
Zuma and his third wife, Thobeka Madiba-Zuma, during a state visit to the Iranian city of Isfahan in 2016

At dawn on 14 February, there was a police raid at the Johannesburg home of the Gupta family, which the Hawks said was related to an investigation into state capture. Baleka Mbete, the Speaker of the National Assembly, announced that the EFF's motion of no confidence in Zuma had been moved forward in the parliamentary schedule, and that it would now be voted on the following day instead of on 22 February. She told journalists that "the recall, most definitely official, is now being implemented by this institution [Parliament]". The ANC announced that it planned to support the opposition's motion, which would ensure its passage. Shortly afterwards, Zuma gave a long live television interview on SABC on 14 February 2018, arguing that he had done nothing wrong and had not been given reasons for his recall. He said that he disagreed with the ANC's decision and was being "victimised". He also said that if he was dismissed, the ANC could be "plunged in a crisis that I'm sure my comrade leaders will regret". According to a later report by City Press, during this period elements of the South African National Defence Force and State Security Agency were unsuccessfully lobbied to launch a revolt to prevent Zuma's removal.

On the same day, in a live televised address just before 11 p.m., Zuma announced his immediate resignation. In his speech, he said that he accepted the ANC's decision but had asked its leadership to "articulate my transgressions and the reason for its immediate instruction that I vacate office". He claimed that he had earlier had an agreement with the party that if he resigned it would be after "a period of transition". He said:

Make no mistake, no leader should stay beyond the time determined by the people they serve... No life should be lost in my name and also the ANC should never be divided in my name... I have therefore come to the decision to resign as President of the Republic with immediate effect. Even though I disagree with the decision of the leadership of my organisation, I have always been a disciplined member of the ANC. As I leave I will continue to serve the people of South Africa as well as the ANC, the organisation I have served all my life. I will dedicate all of my energy to work towards the attainment of the policies of our organisation, in particular the radical economic transformation agenda.

== Post-presidency (2018–present) ==
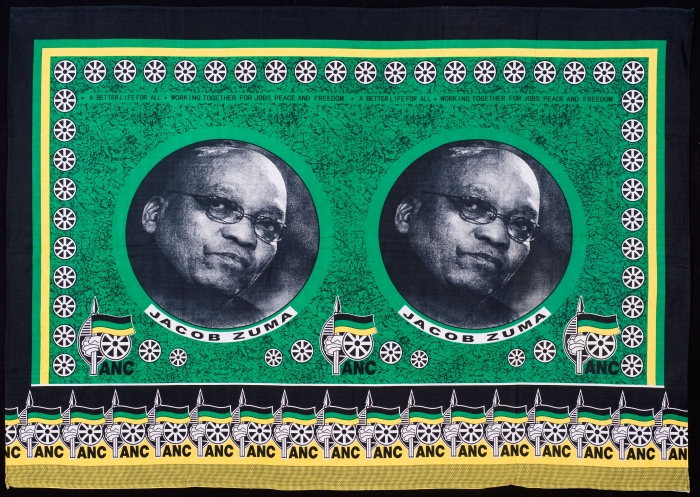
Commemorative ANC cloth from Zuma's 2009 campaign and inauguration

The week after his resignation, Zuma attended a farewell cocktail party in his honour, hosted by Ramaphosa at Tuynhuys in Cape Town and attended by other members of cabinet. Although former presidents are invited to all State of the Nation addresses, Zuma did not attend Ramaphosa's addresses in 2018, 2019, or 2020.

=== Third corruption indictment ===
On 16 March 2018, a month after Zuma resigned from the presidency, the NPA announced that he would again face prosecution on the same 16 criminal charges he was indicted on in 2006: 12 charges of fraud, two of corruption, and one each of racketeering and money laundering, all related to the 1999 Arms Deal and to Zuma's relationship with Shaik. The case was enrolled in the Pietermaritzburg High Court. Zuma pleaded not guilty when the trial began on 26 May 2021. As of May 2024, the trial was scheduled to resume in late April 2025 after many appeals by Zuma.

=== Zondo Commission ===
==== Testimony ====
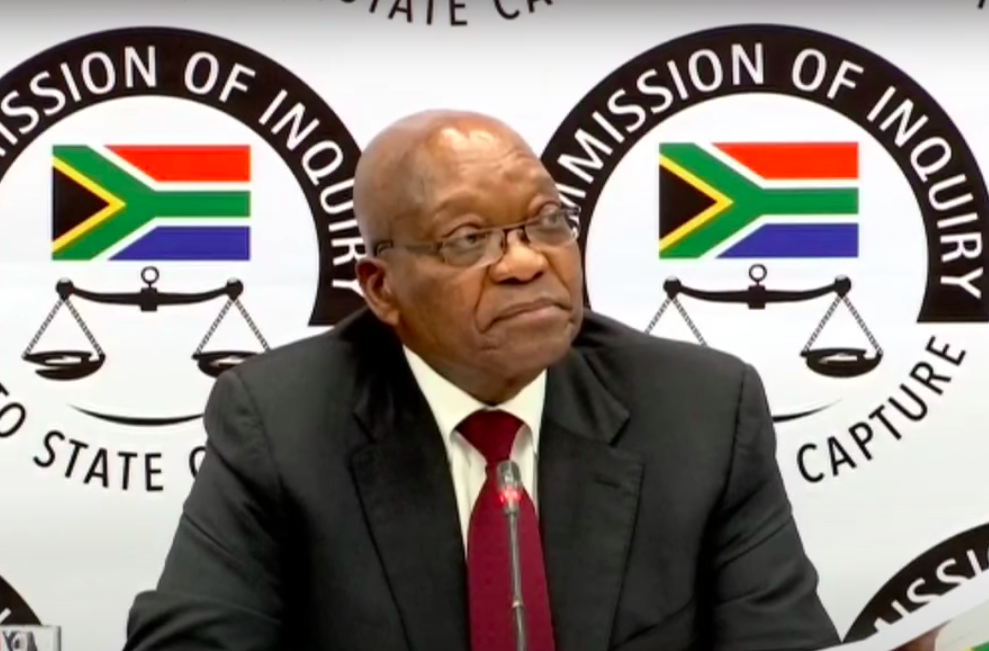
Zuma's third day of testimony to the Zondo Commission, 17 July 2019

At the instruction of the Public Protector and high court, in January 2018 Zuma established the Zondo Commission to investigate fraud, corruption, and state capture in the public sector in South Africa. Zuma was scheduled to testify before the commission for five days in mid-July 2019, and on Monday 15 July he opened his testimony by claiming that the commission was part of a decades-long "character assassination" conspiracy against him. He denied the veracity of several other witnesses' testimony and questioned the appropriateness of the phrase "state capture", which he said was used to discredit him. If the whole state had truly been captured, he argued that the commission should investigate the judiciary and Parliament as well as the executive branch of government. After the hearings, Zuma addressed supporters who gathered outside the commission's offices in Johannesburg.

Before the end of the third day of testimony on Wednesday 17 July, chairperson Ray Zondo adjourned proceedings so that the commission could meet with Zuma and his lawyers in order to discuss Zuma's grievances about his treatment by the commission. On the morning of Friday 19 July, his lawyer announced that Zuma would "take no further part" in the commission's proceedings and would consider court action. Zuma felt that he had been treated like an accused criminal rather than as a witness and that he had been relentlessly cross-examined – though the head of the commission's legal team pointed out that his cross-examination had not yet begun. Later that day Zondo announced that they had come to an agreement: the commission had acquiesced to Zuma's demand to furnish him with specific allegations in advance, and Zuma would provide written statements in response.

In subsequent months, Zuma appeared reluctant to cooperate with the commission, and he did not provide further testimony before it. Zondo issued a summons for Zuma's appearance in the week of 16 November 2020, but Zuma applied to have Zondo recuse himself from proceedings. Zuma claimed that he and Zondo were friends, which Zondo denied, and that there was a conflict of interest arising from their "historical family relations". On the latter point, Zondo conceded that he had had a child with the sister of Zuma's third wife, Thobeka Madiba-Zuma, but pointed out that their relationship had ended in the 1990s, before Zuma and Madiba-Zuma met. On Thursday 19 November, Zondo dismissed Zuma's application for his recusal. When the commission heard Zuma's testimony, Zondo announced that Zuma had left during a break without being excused. He did not return on 20 November.

==== Contempt of court ====
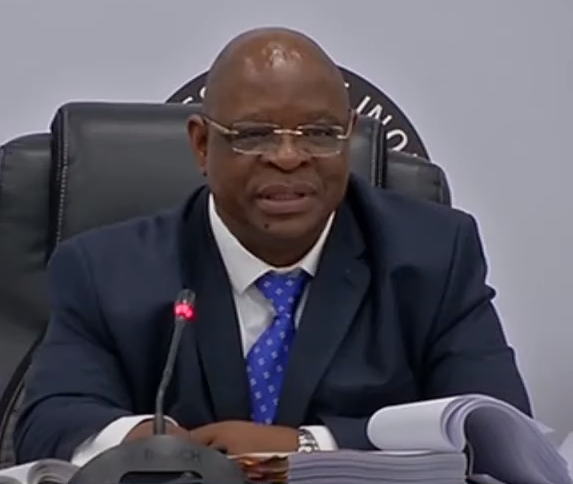
Zuma clashed with the Zondo Commission chairperson, Deputy Chief Justice Raymond Zondo.

In early December, the commission issued summonses for Zuma to appear before it in the weeks of 18 January and 15 February 2021 and applied to the Constitutional Court for an order compelling Zuma to comply with the summonses, which was granted on 28 January. When Zuma did not comply with the February summons, in open defiance of the court order, the commission approached the Constitutional Court and asked it to sentence Zuma to two years' imprisonment for contempt of court. Zuma refused to participate in the contempt proceedings, although he complained of bias, and on 29 June 2021 he was sentenced to 15 months' imprisonment.

==== Arrest and imprisonment ====
Zuma was given until 4 July to hand himself in, after which the police would have until 7 July to arrest him forcibly. The uMkhonto we Sizwe Military Veterans' Association warned that his arrest would destabilise the country, and hundreds of supporters gathered outside his Nkandla residence, threatening violence if he was detained. Zuma told the press that he had been sentenced without trial, saying that it might "remind our people of the apartheid days", and told a rally in Nkandla:

I fought for freedom. I was fighting for these very rights. No one will take my rights away. Even the dead that I fought against during the liberation struggle will turn in their graves.

On 7 July, with the deadline nearing and an outstanding court application by Zuma to halt the arrest, it was unclear whether the South African Police Service planned to arrest him. Forty minutes before the midnight deadline, Zuma handed himself over and was taken to the Estcourt Correctional Centre. On 9 July, the Pietermaritzburg High Court dismissed Zuma's application to have the arrest overturned, citing a lack of evidence for the medical grounds raised by Zuma. There was a severe outbreak of civil unrest in KwaZulu-Natal on the same day linked to Zuma's detention. The Constitutional Court subsequently heard an urgent rescission application by Zuma, reserving judgement on 12 July, but ultimately upheld its earlier sentence in a 7–2 ruling.

On 22 July, Zuma was granted one day's compassionate leave to attend the funeral of his brother Michael. On 6 August, the Department of Correctional Services reported that he had been admitted to hospital for routine medical observation following a routine health check. He underwent surgery for an unspecified condition on 14 August and had to remain hospitalised in order to undergo further medical procedures. On 5 September, he was released on medical parole to receive medical care at home, instead of in hospital, in order to complete the rest of his sentence at his Nkandla home, under supervision in the community corrections system.

The decision was challenged in court by the Democratic Alliance, the Helen Suzman Foundation, and Afriforum. On 15 December 2021, high court judge Keoagile Matojane set aside the parole decision, declaring it unlawful and saying that it undermined respect for the judiciary, the rule of law, and the Constitution. The Medical Parole Advisory Board had advised against parole, but it had been granted by the Correctional Services Commissioner, Arthur Fraser, who had thereby effectively and improperly overruled the board. Zuma was ordered to return to prison, with his time on parole not counted towards his sentence. Zuma's lawyers immediately announced his intention to appeal the high court's decision, and he was granted leave to do so on 21 December.

The Department of Correctional Services declared that Zuma's sentence had ended on 7 October 2022. A ruling had not yet been delivered on his appeal against the cancellation of his medical parole. The Supreme Court of Appeal ruled on 21 November that the medical parole was unlawful, but allowed the national commissioner of the Department of Correctional Services to consider whether the time he spent in parole would count towards his sentence. The Department of Correctional Services appealed the ruling to the Constitutional Court on 16 December. The Constitutional Court however refused to hear the appeal on 13 July 2023. On 11 August 2023, the Department of Correctional Services granted Zuma remission of his 15-month sentence.

== uMkhonto we Sizwe political party ==
In December 2023, Zuma announced that, while planning to remain a lifelong member of the ANC, he would not be campaigning for the ANC in the 2024 South African general election, and would instead be voting for a newly-formed party, uMkhonto we Sizwe (MK Party). He stated that "I cannot and will not" campaign for the ANC of current president Cyril Ramaphosa, Zuma's successor, and that to do so would be a 'betrayal'. On 29 January 2024, Zuma was suspended from the ANC for his endorsement of the MK Party. The ANC approached South Africa's electoral court and contended that Zuma's registration of the MK Party was "unlawful" (as it was a name of the ANC's military wing) and also took on the country's Electoral Commission for allowing its registration. Lawyers for the MK Party told the court that the ANC knew about the existence of the party since its registration in September 2023 but wondered why they waited this long for Zuma to endorse it before challenging it. Judges for the electoral court then dismissed the ANC's request and found that the MK Party's registration was lawful.

Just two weeks after his suspension from the ANC, the ANC alliance partner, SANCO, in KZN announced on 16 February 2024 that it had expelled Zuma because of absenteeism. Zuma had served as provincial chairperson of SANCO since 19 November 2023 after being elected unopposed in absentia at the organisation's conference in Durban. The organisation said since his election Zuma never attended a single meeting and its provincial executive committee took the decision to get rid of him and find a replacement. On 28 March 2024, Zuma was banned from running in the 2024 South African general election over his 2021 conviction and jailing for contempt of court as the South African law doesn't allow convicted candidates to stand for public office. On 20 May 2024, the Constitutional Court of South Africa would also bar Zuma from the running for parliament in the 2024 election, ruling that his early release was irrelevant.

Having been a member of the African National Congress for over 45 years, his support for the rival party led to him being expelled from the ANC on 29 July 2024.

== Personality and public image ==
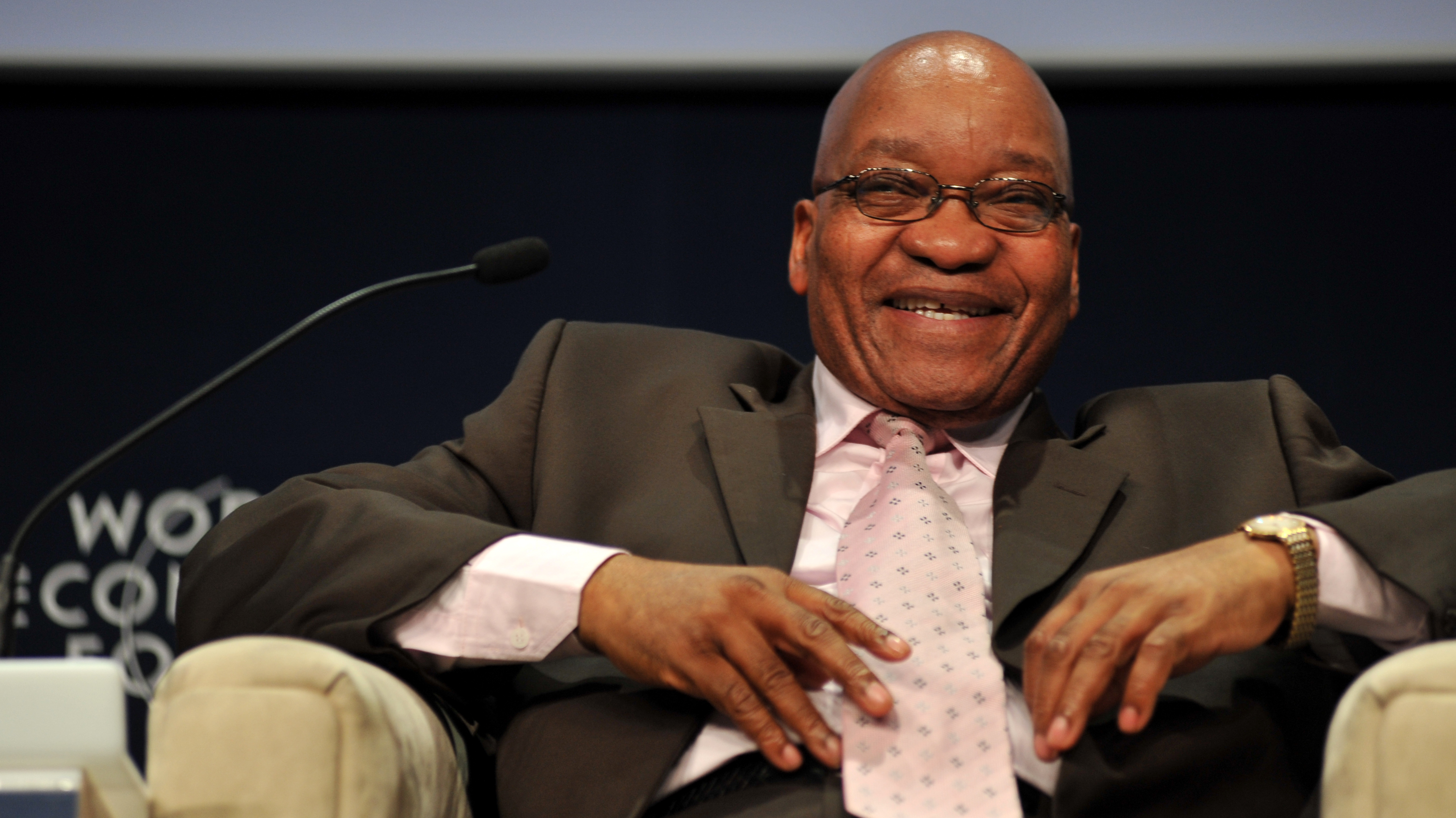
Zuma's trademark laugh, 2009

Zuma's "charisma and affable personality" is at the centre of his public image, and is thought to be responsible for much of his political popularity. His charisma is most fully on display at his political rallies, which sociologist Roger Southall describes as laden with "political theatre" and "popular idiom", especially through song – his longstanding trademark is uMkhonto we Sizwe anthem "Umshini wami" (English: Bring Me My Machine Gun), but he also became associated with "Yinde lendlela" (English: It's a Long Journey) after the ANC's Mangaung conference in 2012. Journalist Alec Russell wrote in 2009, "When Zuma gets in front of these crowds, he is more than a politician: briefly, he becomes something closer to a revivalist preacher, or the leader of a cult."

Zuma is known for his sense of humour, and to the disapproval of opposition politicians, as president he frequently joked during his addresses to Parliament, including the mockery of the Democratic Alliance's fixation on the Nkandla scandal. On 1 April 2015, his office released a statement about new cabinet appointments which was later revealed as an April Fools' Day prank on the media. Some have said that one factor in Zuma's popularity is what Southall calls "the politics of charismatic buffoonery". In one phrase, his public persona has been "constructed as sometimes slightly gormless, but warm and accessible". Mondli Makhanya wrote:

Zuma's other great strength was that he did not mind looking stupid. And so he sang and danced at will. Whereas other politicians use this as an election gimmick, Zuma did it all the time and genuinely seemed to enjoy it. In Parliament and on public platforms he laughed and giggled as if he had inhaled a potent hallucinogenic. The more stupid he looked, the more it seemed to endear him to the people.

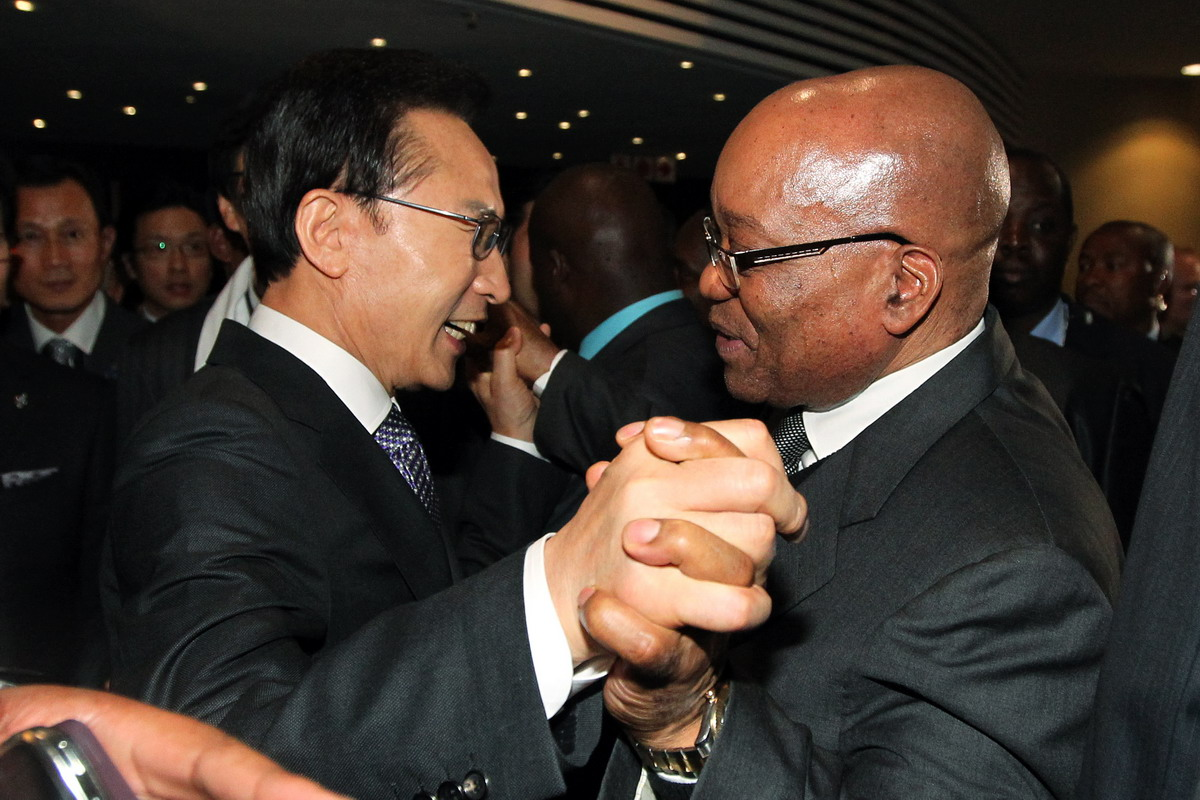
Zuma embraces South Korean President Lee Myung-bak in 2011.

As a politician, he was viewed as an accessible figure – "a simple man, a man of the people", and a good listener. In a 2009 interview, Zuma said that apartheid-era ANC president Oliver Tambo inspired his public posture:

While Tambo was a great thinker, he was very simple. There is nothing he did not do... When people came to him he attended to them. He would even attend to somebody who comes to raise the issue of the shoe that doesn't have shoelaces, he would ensure that the shoelaces were found... I am not a great man. I am a man of the people. I believe in people and I think that the people are everything. Once there is disconnection with the people you have problems.

His connection to the "grassroots" is partly due to his embrace of his rural background, ethnic heritage, and lack of formal education. These aspects of his persona are frequently contrasted with the perceived intellectualism and Pan-Africanism of the ANC under Mbeki. Especially in combination with his penchant for struggle songs and the toyi-toyi, Zuma's acceptance of his background has been described as tapping into "popular understandings, memories, and meanings of racial oppression, racialised dispossession, and struggles of freedom" during apartheid and thereafter. On the ethnic front, he often presents himself as a Zulu traditionalist, and has been associated with social conservatism. He is a polygamist, in line with Zulu tradition, and at a 2006 rally in KwaZulu-Natal, for example, he publicly spoke against same-sex marriage. He was frequently photographed wearing traditional Zulu attire at cultural events, and he appears less comfortable speaking in English than in his native Zulu, in which he is known for his "linguistic flair".

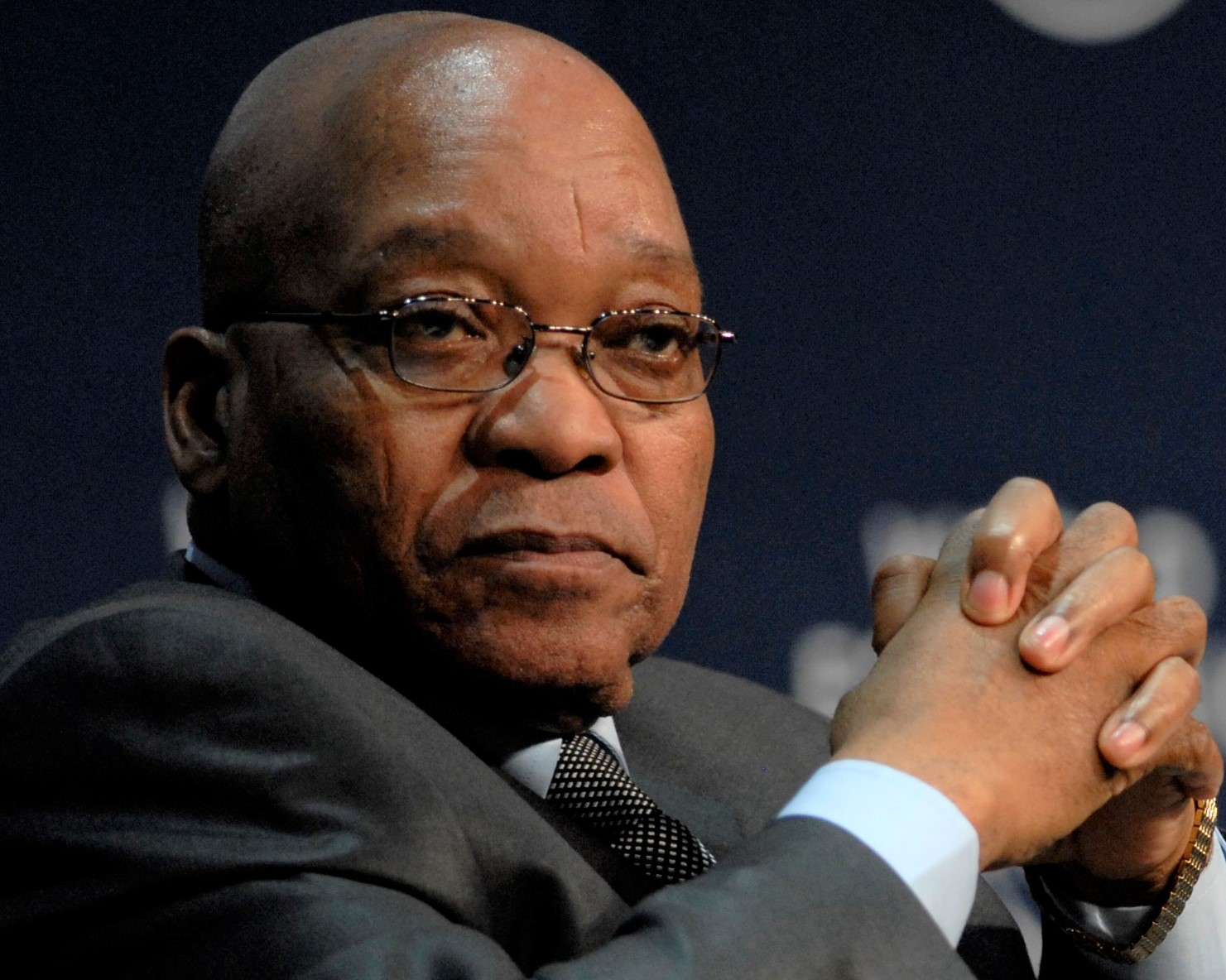
Zuma in 2009

Some commentators have claimed that his broad appeal arises from "the populist's trait of sometimes saying what his audiences want to hear", and he has frequently been called a political "chameleon", with little known about what political principles and ideologies he subscribes to personally. This characterisation was made as early as 2007, when, ahead of the ANC's Polokwane conference, the Financial Mail ran the first of two stories on Zuma, famously published under the headline "Be Afraid". The articles criticised Zuma as an "opportunist" and concluded, in the paraphrase of New York Times journalist Barry Bearak, that he was "far more interested in holding power than in making policy, long on charm if short on intellect".

During his post-presidency legal battles, when Zuma publicly claimed that he was being vilified under a conspiracy, William Gumede and others criticised what they called his "narcissism".

== Controversies ==
=== Alleged abuses by bodyguards ===
In 2010, Zuma's bodyguards were implicated in multiple incidents involving members of the public and journalists.

In February, a Cape Town student, Chumani Maxwele, was detained by police after allegedly showing Zuma's motorcade a "rude gesture". Maxwele, an active ANC member, was released after 24 hours, having provided a written apology to police, which he later claimed was coerced. He also claimed that his home had been raided by plain-clothes policemen, and that he had been forced into the vehicle at gunpoint. Maxwele later instituted legal action against the police, and a complaint was filed on his behalf to the Human Rights Commission. The incident led to a heated dispute when it was discussed in Parliament.

In March, journalist Tshepo Lesole was forced to delete pictures of Zuma's convoy from his camera by police, and two photographers were detained by police when photographing Zuma's Johannesburg home. Sky News reporter Emma Hurd claimed she had been pushed, manhandled and "groped" by Zuma's bodyguards in 2009.

=== "Shoot the Boer" song ===
In January 2012, Zuma gave a speech at the ANC Centennial 2012 celebrations in Bloemfontein and, afterwards, sang the controversial song "Dubul' ibhunu" ("Shoot the Boer").

=== "The Spear" painting ===
In 2012, Zuma was featured in a satirical painting by Cape Town-based artist Brett Murray, who depicted him in his painting The Spear, with his genitals exposed. The ANC responded by threatening court action against the gallery showing the painting, and further demanding that the image should be removed from online sources. On 22 May 2012, the painting was vandalised while it was hanging in an art gallery in Johannesburg. Zuma's face and genitals were painted over.

=== Panama Papers revelations ===
Clive Khulubuse Zuma, Jacob Zuma's nephew, was named in the Panama Papers as a result of his links to oilfields in the Democratic Republic of the Congo (DRC). Shortly after Jacob Zuma met with DRC president Joseph Kabila, Khulubuse Zuma's company Caprikat Limited secured a 100-billion-rand oil deal in the DRC.

== Jacob Zuma Foundation ==
Zuma started the foundation to send children to school and build houses for people living in poverty. The former chairperson of the foundation is Dudu Myeni, before she resigned from her memberships on the boards of directors of these and other bodies because she was declared a delinquent director for life in May 2020 by the Pretoria High Court.

== Personal life ==
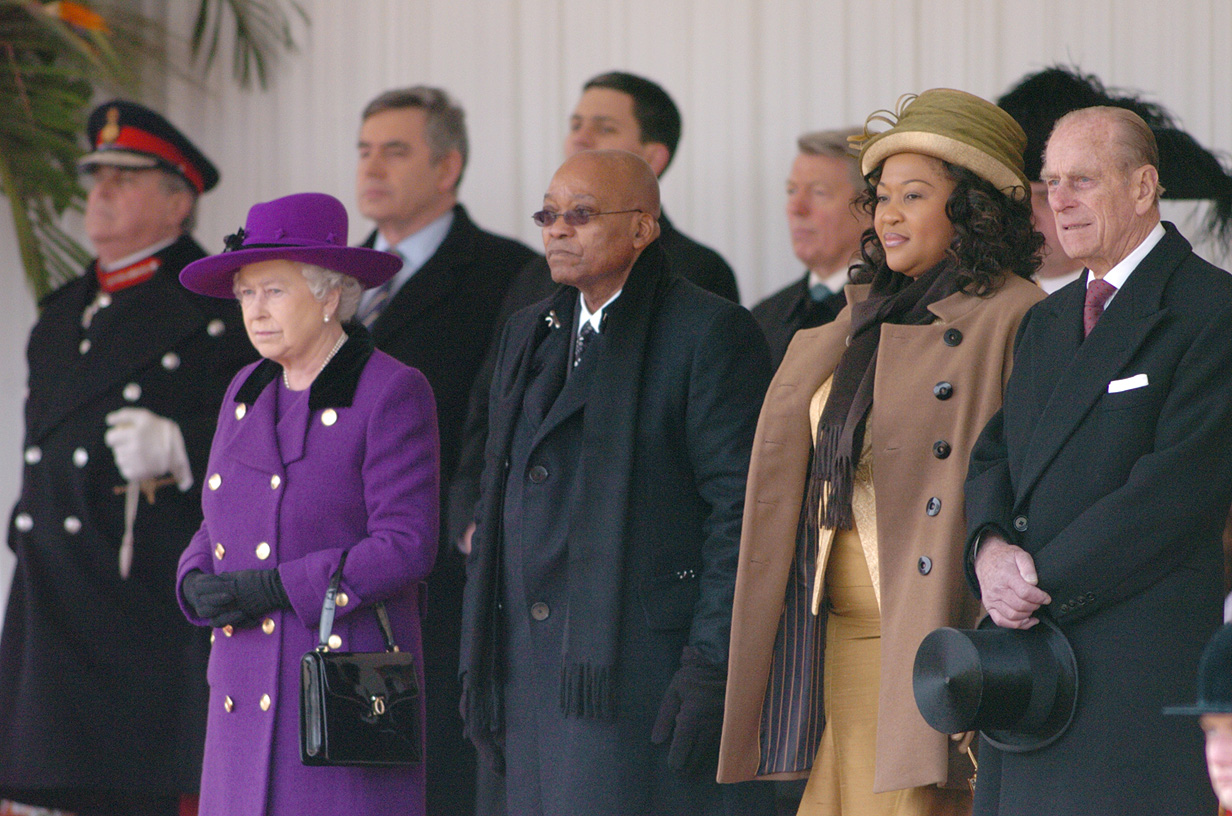
Zuma and his third wife Thobeka Madiba-Zuma with Queen Elizabeth and Prince Philip in London, 2010

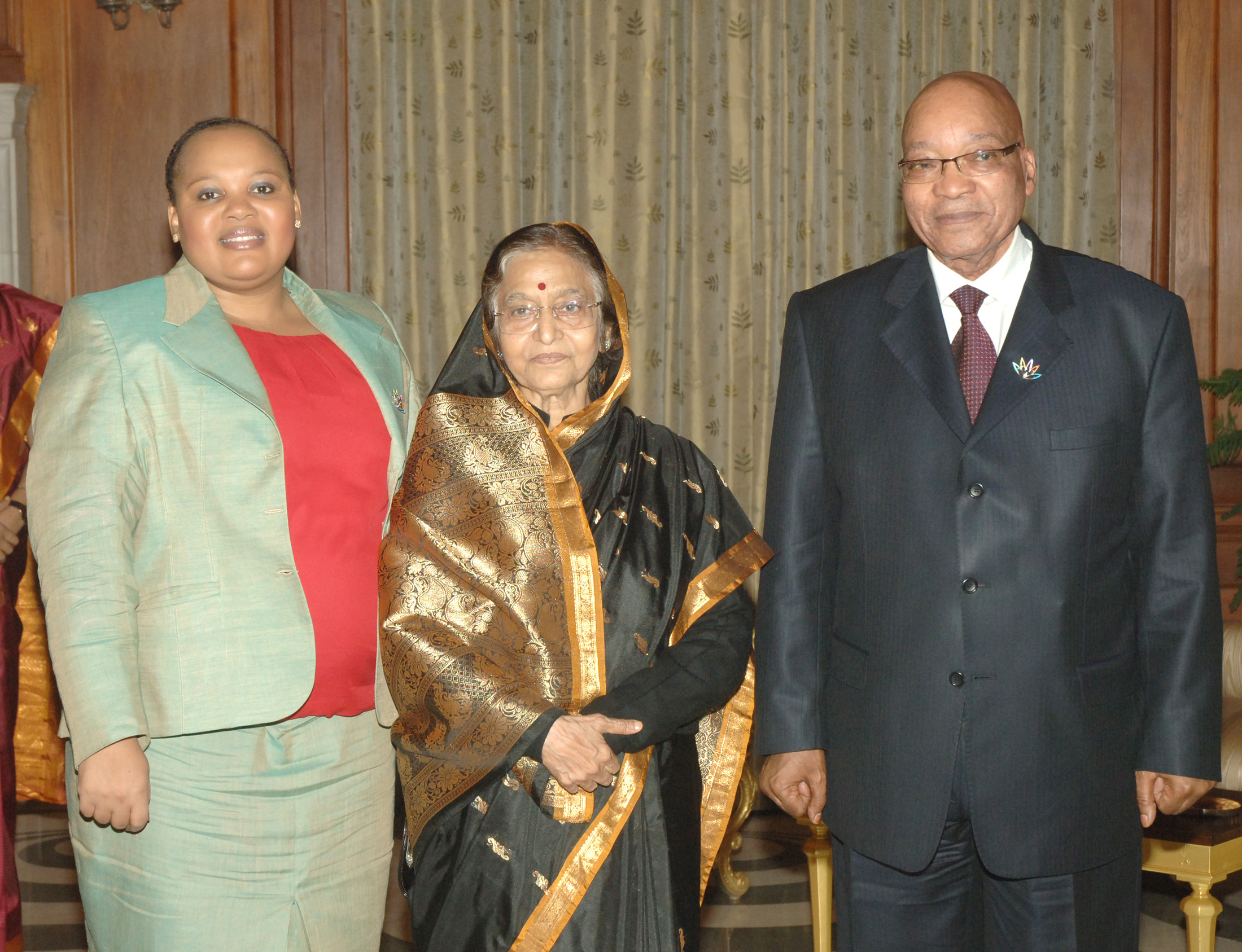
Zuma and his second wife Nompumelelo Ntuli with Indian President Pratibha Patil in New Delhi, 2012

=== Polygamy ===
Zuma is a polygamist, in line with traditional Zulu culture, and has been married six times. In 2012 the Daily Telegraph estimated he had 20 children, and in 2014 the Guardian reported he has 21, some of whom were born out of wedlock. In an interview, he said:

There are plenty of politicians who have mistresses and children that they hide so as to pretend they're monogamous. I prefer to be open. I love my wives and I'm proud of my children.

Less than a year into Zuma's presidency in March 2010, responding to a parliamentary question from the DA, the Minister in the Presidency, Collins Chabane, reported that the state spousal support budget was about R15.52 million, close to double the budget in the previous year when Kgalema Motlanthe had been president. Opposition leader Helen Zille expressed disapproval. In subsequent years, Zuma's spokesperson, Mac Maharaj, stressed that South Africa did not have a formal office for the first lady, and that the state did not support the President's wives or children except insofar as it funded some travel expenses and spousal participation at official functions. Yet in June 2012, there were reports that activists in the Eastern Cape branch of the ANC were backing a proposal that only Zuma's first wife should receive state support.

=== Wives and children ===
Gertrude Sizakele Khumalo, 1973–present
Zuma met Khumalo (born 2 March 1940) in 1959 and they married shortly after his release from prison in 1973. They have no children together.
Kate Mantsho, 1976–2000
Zuma married Mantsho (born 2 September 1956 in Mozambique) in 1976 while he was in exile in Mozambique. She committed suicide on 8 December 2000 and is buried in Heroes' Acre at Westpark Cemetery in Johannesburg. Mantsho is the mother of twins Duduzile and Duduzane (born 1984), and three other children born in 1980, 1989, and 1993, the last of whom, Nhlakanipho Vusi, died on 1 July 2018.
Nkosazana Dlamini, 1982–1998
Zuma met Dlamini (born 27 January 1949), an ANC politician and cabinet minister, while he was in exile in Swaziland. They were married in 1982 and divorced in June 1998. Dlamini is the mother of Gugulethu (born 1985), Nokuthula (also known as Thuli, born 1987), and Thuthukile (born 1989), as well as another child born in 1982. His daughter Brumelda Zuma is a member of parliament.
Nompumelelo Ntuli, 2008–present
Zuma married Ntuli (born 1975) on 5 January 2008. From 2014, she was investigated by police on the allegation that she had attempted to kill Zuma with poisoned tea. She denied the allegation and the NPA declined to prosecute her due to insufficient evidence. As of 2022, she and Zuma are reportedly estranged. They have three children, born in 2002, 2006, and 2010.
Thobeka Stacie Mabhija, 2010–present
Zuma married Mabhija, also known as Thobeka Madiba (born 1973), on 4 January 2010. She and Zuma are reportedly estranged, and in 2020 she sued Zuma for spousal maintenance and then filed for divorce. They have three children.
Gloria Bongekile Ngema, 2012–present
In April 2012, Zuma married Ngema (born 1965), with whom he already had a son, Sinqumo (born c. 2009). In 2017, emails leaked as part of the so-called #GuptaLeaks suggested that the Gupta family had partially funded the purchase of Ngema's R5.4-million house in Waterkloof Ridge, Pretoria.

Zuma has also been engaged to other women, including, from 2002, Princess Sebentile Dlamini, a niece of Swazi King Mswati III. Zuma paid the traditional lobola in cattle, but, as of 2022, they have not married, although the Citizen reported in 2017 that they were still engaged. He was also engaged to Nonkanyiso Conco (born 16 October 1993), a cast member on Real Housewives of Durban, but has broken off the engagement and are reportedly estranged. They have a child together: Sakh'muzi (born 12 April 2018).

Zuma's firstborn child was born 1977 to Minah Shongwe, sister of Judge Jeremiah Shongwe, who asked to be recused from Zuma's rape trial because of the relationship. He also has two children, born in 1998 and 2002, with Pietermaritzburg businesswoman Nonkululeko Mhlongo, whom he met in 1990 and to whom he was rumoured to be engaged. In 2024, Nomcebo became engaged to King Mswati III of Eswatini. In March 2017, a covert recording was leaked in which Mhlongo allegedly outlined a plan for defrauding the KwaZulu-Natal government, apparently with Zuma's knowledge. His other children include a daughter born 8 October 2009 to Sonono Khoza, the daughter of soccer administrator Irvin Khoza, and, according to media reports, three children to a woman from Johannesburg and one to a woman from Richards Bay.

In September 2024, Zuma's 21-year-old daughter, Nomcebo, from his wife, Nonkululeko Mhlongo, became engaged to King Mswati III, the ruler of Eswatini. The engagement was announced following the conclusion of the annual reed dance ceremony, known as the Umhlanga ceremony, at the Ludzidzini Royal Palace. During the event, Nomcebo Zuma was presented as the "liphovela," a Siswati term to denote a royal fiancée.

Nomcebo’s mother and Zuma were present during the ceremony.

=== 2009 "love-child" ===
In January 2010, the Sunday Times reported that Khoza had given birth to Zuma's daughter in 2009, and Zuma ultimately confirmed that he had paid inhlawulo, acknowledging paternity, and appealed for privacy. Opposition parties criticised Zuma's actions. Both the African Christian Democratic Party and the DA said that it undermined the government's HIV/AIDS prevention programme, which promoted safe sex and marital fidelity. DA leader Zille also argued that it was not a purely private matter, since elected public officials had to embody the principles and values for which they stood. The Congress of the People said that Zuma could no longer use African cultural practices to justify his "promiscuity", and Independent Democrats leader Patricia de Lille said that Zuma was asking people "to do as I say and not as I do".

Zuma initially denied that the incident was relevant to the government's HIV/AIDS programme and appealed for privacy. However, amid public controversy, on 6 February Zuma said he "deeply regretted the pain that he caused to his family, the ANC, the alliance and South Africans in general". Similarly, the ANC initially defended Zuma, saying that it saw no links between its HIV/AIDS policies and Zuma's personal life, but on 5 February acknowledged the widespread disapproval and said that it had listened to the public and learnt "many valuable lessons". ANC Youth League leader Julius Malema said, "Zuma is our father so we are not qualified to talk about that", but committed the Youth League to continual emphasis on its HIV/AIDS programme and "one boyfriend, one girlfriend" stance in a nationwide awareness campaign. ANC Women's League deputy president Nosipho Ntwanambi said:

With many African people for instance, and generally speaking, it is not right to have an extramarital affair if you have committed to yourself to a marriage. But under the Customary Marriages Act, if the first wife agrees, and if all these issues are discussed with her, we can't do anything.

Zwelinzima Vavi, the general secretary of the ANC's Tripartite Alliance partner the Congress of South African Trade Unions, said that he passed no judgment but hoped that the matter would be "on Zuma's conscience", while also reiterating Zuma's appeal for privacy.

== Honours and awards ==
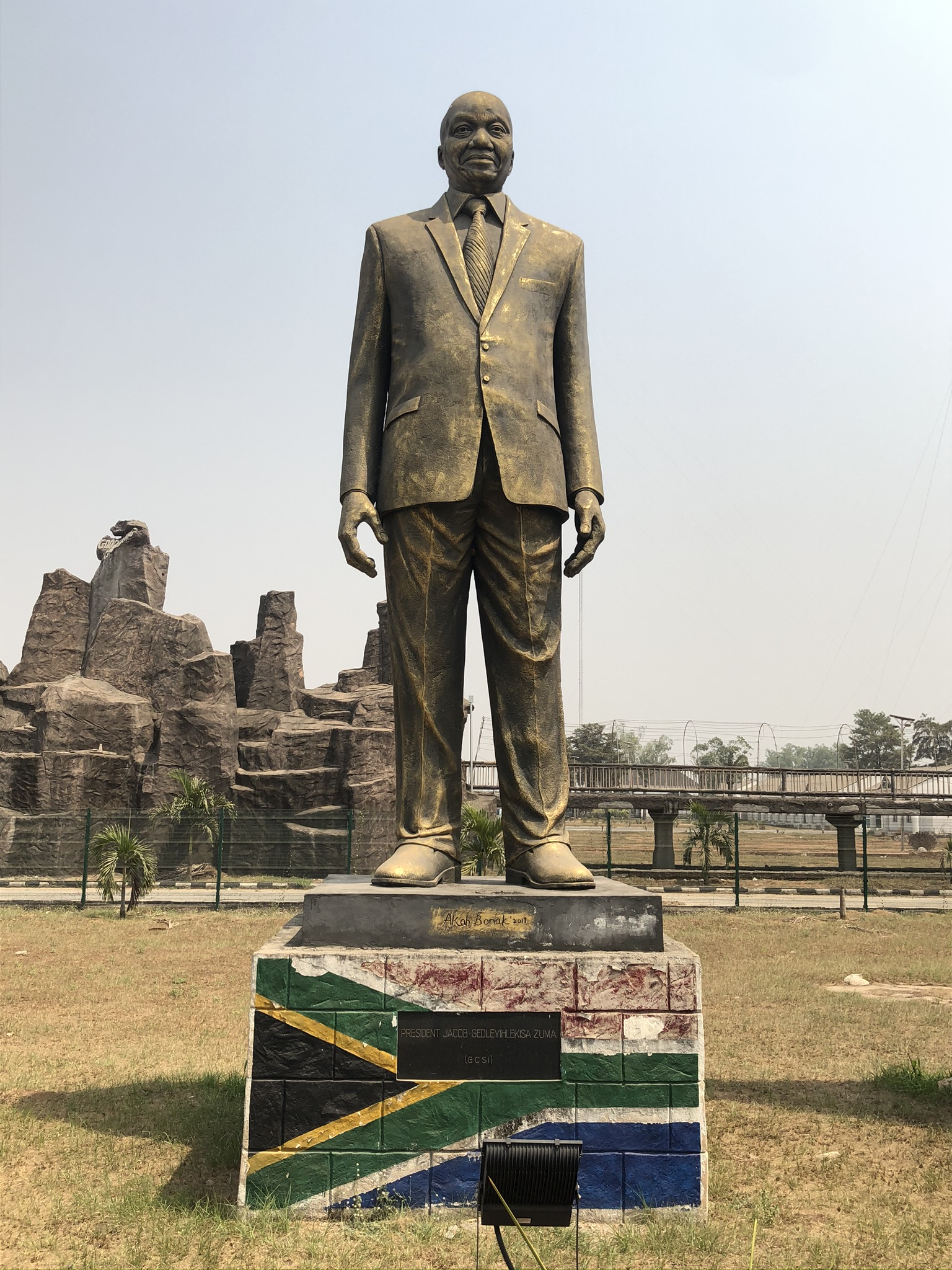
Statue of Jacob Zuma in Owerri, Imo state, Nigeria

=== Honours ===
Year	Country	Order
2010	Cuba	Order of José Martí
2010	United Kingdom	Knight Grand Cross of the Most Honourable Order of the Bath (GCB)
2010	Zambia	Grand Commander of the Order of the Eagle of Zambia
2016	Serbia	Grand Cross of the Order of the Republic of Serbia
2016	Saudi Arabia	Collar of the Order of Abdulaziz Al Saud

=== Awards ===
- Nelson Mandela Award for Outstanding Leadership from the Medical University of South Africa, awarded in Washington, D.C. (1998)
- During a visit to the United Kingdom in 2010, Jacob Zuma was made an honorary Knight Grand Cross of the Order of the Bath.
- Imo Merit Award, the highest award in the Imo State of Nigeria, is conferred on those who have made a difference in the development of their communities. (15 October 2017)

=== Statues ===
- Nigeria's Imo State unveiled a statue of Jacob Zuma on 15 October 2017.

=== Honorary degrees ===
- University of Zululand (2001), Honorary Doctor of Administration
- University of Fort Hare (2001), Honorary Doctor of Literature/Letters
- Medical University of Southern Africa (2001), Honorary Doctor of Philosophy
- University of Zambia (UNZA) Great East Campus (2009), Honorary Doctor of Law
- Peking University (2012), Honorary Professor of International Relations

=== Other honours ===
- Zuma was invested with a chieftaincy title – that of the Ochiaga of Imo – during his trip to the kingdom of Eze Samuel Ohiri of Imo on 15 October 2017.

== Filmography ==
- The Passion of Jacob Zuma, a 2009 French documentary by Jean-Baptiste Dusséaux and Matthieu Niango
- Motherland, a 2010 documentary directed by Owen 'Alik Shahadah
- How to Steal a Country, a 2019 South African documentary directed by Rehad Desai

== See also ==
- Presidency of Jacob Zuma
- Schabir Shaik trial
- The Spear
- Gupta family

== Notes ==
Political offices
Preceded by Thabo Mbeki	Deputy President of South Africa; 1999–2005	Succeeded by Phumzile Mlambo-Ngcuka
Preceded by Kgalema Motlanthe	President of South Africa; 2009–2018	Succeeded by Cyril Ramaphosa
Party political offices
Preceded by Thabo Mbeki	President of the African National Congress; 2007–2017	Succeeded by Cyril Ramaphosa
