= Khulubuse Zuma =

South African businessman

- Occupation: Businessman
- Known for: implication in the Panama Papers leak
- Partner: Fikisiwe Dlamini
- Relatives: Jacob Zuma (uncle)

Clive Khulubuse Zuma is a South African businessman, and the nephew of the former President, Jacob Zuma.

Following the election of his uncle to the presidency he was involved in a number of "opaque deals with Chinese and South Korean companies."

In South Africa he became well known for stating that his obesity and resulting ill health was the reason why he could not testify at the liquidation hearings of one of his business ventures.

Zuma was named in the Panama Papers leak as a result of his links to oilfields in the Democratic Republic of the Congo (DRC). Shortly after President Zuma, his uncle, met with DRC president Joseph Kabila, Zuma's company Caprikat Limited secured a R100 billion rand oil deal in the DRC.

In 2014, he got engaged to Swazi princess, Fikisiwe Dlamini.
