= Jacob Zuma Statue =

Monument of South African president in Imo State, Nigeria

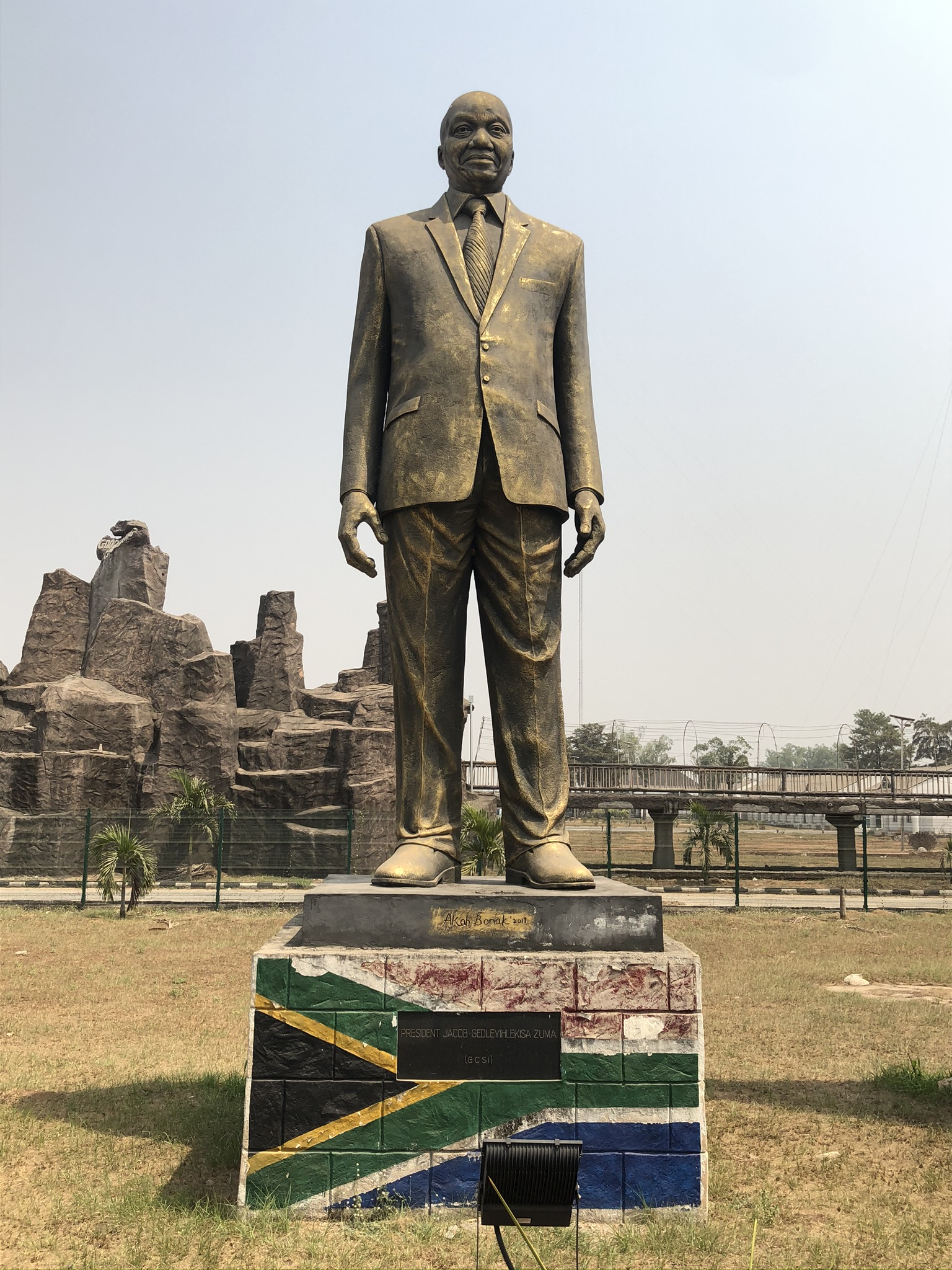
Jacob Zuma

The Statue of Jacob Zuma is a bronze monument in Imo State, Nigeria. erected by Governor Rochas Okorocha of Imo State. The monument commemorated the visit of the South African President Jacob Zuma who visited Imo State when he was still the President. Governor Okorocha stated during the unveiling of the statue that: "We have decided to honor you for your love for education, though you were deprived in your early days in life but you are working to make sure that every poor child went to school". The unveiling was done in the state capital Owerri during a ceremony attended by former President Olusegun Obasanjo, former governors, chiefs and distinguished members of the state.

The statue cost around 520 million Naira.

A Memorandum of Understanding (MOU) was signed by Governor Okorocha and President Zuma, to provide free education for poor children on the continent. President Zuma was also given a Chieftaincy title of Ochiagha Imo that translates to the "ceremonial leader of warriors" by Eze Imo, Samuel Ohiri.
