= How to Steal a Country =

2019 South African documentary film

- Directed by: Rehad Desai; Mark J. Kaplan
- Written by: Anita Khanna
- Story by: Real events
- Produced by: Rehad Desai; Anita Khanna; Zivia Desai Keiper
- Cinematography: Nic Hofmeyr; Duncan Tilley; Shavez Ahmed; Fred Burns; Derek Allen; Ian Ross; Sandile Sethi; Eran Tahor
- Edited by: Megan Gill; Geert Veuskens; Nikki Comninos
- Music by: Jannous Aukema
- Production company: Uhuru Productions
- Distributed by: Parallel 40 - Planeta Med (2021) (Spain) (all media); Yleisradio (YLE) (2020) (Finland) (TV)
- Release date: 26 November 2019; (Netherlands)
- Running time: 99 minutes
- Country: South Africa
- Language: English

How to Steal a Country (theatrically as Att stjäla ett land), is a 2019 South African documentary film directed by Rehad Desai and co-produced by director himself with Anita Khanna and Zivia Desai Keiper.

== Synopsis ==
The film revolves around an example of the concept of state capture in South Africa, based on the revelations by whistleblowers and investigative journalists of alleged corruption scandals surrounding former President Jacob Zuma and the Gupta family, primarily in the years from 2013 to 2018. The film contains interviews with journalists about their reporting; recorded interviews with key individuals such as Zuma's son Duduzane Zuma; scenes from the 2013 controversial wedding which was preceded by a private aeroplane landing at a South African Air Force base; scenes from a political defeat of Zuma through the election of Cyril Ramaphosa as president of the ANC party in December 2017; scenes from Zuma's 2019 testimony at the Judicial Commission of Inquiry into Allegations of State Capture; as well as aerial images of companies, places, and organisations associated in some way with the scandals, such as Transnet, SAP, KPMG, and the Vrede Dairy Project.

== Reception ==
The film had its premiere on 26 November 2019 at the IDFA in the Netherlands. The film won two Golden Horns in 2021 at the South African Film and Television Awards. The film also screened at the 2020 Durban International Film Festival and the 2020 Encounters South African International Documentary Festival. It has received mixed reviews from critics. The film has been used since 2021 in Germany for high-school units on state corruption.

== Film title ==
How to Steal a Country is also the title of a 2018 book that is not affiliated with this film. It was written by Robin Renwick, a former British diplomat who served as the Ambassador to the Republic of South Africa from 1987 to 1991. In it he also describes the political situation of South Africa under the leadership of Jacob Zuma.
