= Inhlawulo =

Inhlawulo [int͡ɬawuːlo], in Swazi/Zulu law, is a fine or damages paid.

In Zulu culture, inhlawulo refers to damages paid to the family of a woman who became pregnant out of wedlock by the father of the future child.
